= The Best of the Chieftains =

Compilation album by The Chieftains
- Released: January 14, 1992
- Genre: Folk
- Length: 48:26
- Label: Columbia Records
- Producer: Lawrence Cohn (Digital Producer)

The Chieftains chronology
An Irish Evening (1992)	The Best of the Chieftains (1992)	Music at Matt Molloy’s (1992)

Professional ratings
Review scores
Source	Rating
AllMusic	4/5 stars

The Best of the Chieftains is a 1992 compilation album consisting of songs from three of The Chieftains earlier solo albums, The Chieftains 7, The Chieftains 8 and The Chieftains 9: Boil the Breakfast Early.

== Critical reception ==
Bruce Eder of AllMusic concludes his review by saying, "The material, a good distillation of the best of those three albums, all sounds fine and represents the group's virtuoso sound from this period."

William Ramoutar writes in his review of the album for Irish Culture and Customs, "This is when The Chieftains were at their strongest and stayed that way for many years. This is the way I want to remember The Chieftains."

Scott Hudson of Pop Matters says, "For the uninitiated, The Best of the Chieftains is great place to start, but by all means don't stop there."

== Track listing ==
No.	Title	Writer(s)	Length
1.	"Up Against the Buachalawns"	Matt Molloy	4:00
2.	"Boil the Breakfast Early"	Paddy Moloney	3:52
3.	"Friel's Kitchen"	Traditional	4:40
4.	"No. 6 The Coombe"	Traditional	3:49
5.	"O'Sullivan's March"	Traditional	3:58
6.	"Sea Image"	Paddy Moloney	6:07
7.	"An Speic Seoigheach"	Paddy Moloney	3:34
8.	"The Dogs Among The Bushes"	Traditional	2:04
9.	"The Job of Journeywork"	Martin Fay	4:14
10.	"Oh! The Breeches Full Of Stitches"	Traditional	4:20
11.	"Chase Around the Windmill/Toss the Feathers/Ballinasloe Fair/Caílleach an Airgid/Cúil Aodha Slide/The Pretty Girl"	Paddy Moloney(1-3,5); Kevin Conneff (1,4); Martin Fay (1,6)	4:59
12.	"The Wind that Shakes the Barley/The Reel with the Beryle"	Traditional	2:49
Total length:			48:26

== Musicians ==
- Paddy Moloney – Uilleann pipes, tin whistle
- Seán Keane – Fiddle
- Mike Tubridy – Flute, tin whistle, concertina
- Kevin Cunniffe – Bodhran (goatskin drum), vocals, lilting
- Matt Malloy – Flute
- Martin Fay – Fiddle
- Derek Bell – Harp, timpan, oboe
- Seán Potts – Tin whistle

== Production ==
- Lawrence Cohn – Digital Producer
- David Mitson – Digital Remastering
- Penny Armstrong – Product Mamager
- Gina Companaro – Packaging Coordinator
- Joel Zimmerman – Art Director
- Cover photo courtesy of Shanachie Records

Track information and credits verified from the album's liner notes as well as Discogs, 45 Worlds and AllMusic.
