= The Chieftains 8 =

Studio album by The Chieftains
- Released: 1978
- Genre: Irish folk music
- Label: Columbia
- Producer: Paddy Moloney; Lawrence Cohn (re-release)

The Chieftains chronology
The Chieftains Live! (1977)	The Chieftains 8 (1978)	The Chieftains 9: Boil the Breakfast Early (1980)

Professional ratings
Review scores
Source	Rating
Allmusic	4/5 stars

The Chieftains 8 is an album by The Chieftains. Originally recorded for Claddagh Records and released in 1978, it was re-released on Columbia Records. It is the last of the group's albums recorded before members Seán Potts and Michael Tubridy left the band. The band performed "If I Had Maggie In The Wood" on Saturday Night Live in March 1979.

== Track listing ==
1. "The Session"
2. "Doctor John Hart"
3. "Seán Sa Cheo"
4. "An tSean Bhean Bhocht/The Fairies' Hornpipe"
5. "Sea Image"
6. "If I Had Maggie In The Wood"
7. "An Speic Seoigheach"
8. "The Dogs Among The Bushes"
9. "Miss Hamilton"
10. "The Job Of Journeywork"
11. "The Wind that Shakes the Barley/The Reel With The Beryle"

== Personnel ==
- Paddy Moloney – Uilleann pipes, tin whistle
- Seán Potts – tin whistle
- Seán Keane – fiddle
- Martin Fay – fiddle, bones
- Michael Tubridy – flute, concertina, tin whistle
- Derek Bell – neo Irish harp, medieval harps, tiompán
- Kevin Conneff – bodhrán
