= The Chieftains 9: Boil the Breakfast Early =

Studio album by The Chieftains
- Released: 1979
- Recorded: 1979
- Genre: Irish folk music
- Length: 39:14
- Label: Claddagh
- Producer: Paddy Moloney

The Chieftains chronology
The Chieftains 8 (1978)	The Chieftains 9: Boil the Breakfast Early (1979)	The Chieftains 10: Cotton-Eyed Joe (1981)

Professional ratings
Review scores
Source	Rating
AllMusic	3/5 stars

The Chieftains 9: Boil the Breakfast Early is an Irish folk album by The Chieftains. This album featured a big change in The Chieftains sound, because two of the founding members, Seán Potts and Michael Tubridy, had left the group. The replacement for Tubridy was Matt Molloy, who had been a member of both The Bothy Band and Planxty.

This album also featured a song where Kevin Conneff for the first time sings a cappella. Jolyon Jackson also played cello on three tracks.

== Track listing ==
1. "Boil the Breakfast Early" – 3:51
  - "Boil the Breakfast Early" (reel)
  - "Scotch Mary" (reel)
  - "The Chicago Reel" (reel)
2. "Mrs. Judge" (composed by Turlough O'Carolan) – 3:59
3. "March From Oscar And Malvina" – 4:11
4. "When A Man's In Love" (Kevin Conneff vocal solo) – 3:35
5. "Bealach An Doirín" – 3:41
  - "The Home Ruler" (hornpipe)
  - "Terry 'Cuz' Teahan's Favourite" (slide)
  - "Charlie's Buttermilk Mary" (reel)
6. "Ag Taisteal Na Blárnan (Travelling Through Blarney)" – 3:19
7. "Carolan's Welcome" (composed by Turlough O'Carolan) – 2:51
8. "Up Against the Buachalawns" – 4:00
  - "Larry Redican's Reel" (reel)
  - "Up Against the Buachalawns" (reel)
  - "Johnny Maguires Reel" (reel)
  - "Sweeney's Dream" (reel)
9. "Gol Na Mban San Ár" – 4:16
  - "Gol Na Mban San Ár (The Crying of the Women at the Slaughter)" (air)
  - "Seán Ó 'Duibhir a'Ghleanna (John O'Dwyer of the Glen" (set dance)
10. "Chase Around the Windmill" (medley) – 5:02
  - "Toss The Feathers" (reel)
  - "Ballinasloe Fair" (jig)
  - "Caílleach An Airgid (The Hag with the Money)" (jig)
  - "Cúil Aodha Slide" (slide)
  - "The Pretty Girl" (slide)

== Personnel ==
- Paddy Moloney – Uilleann pipes, tin whistle
- Seán Keane – fiddle
- Martin Fay – fiddle, bones
- Derek Bell – neo Irish harp, medieval harps, tiompán
- Kevin Conneff – bodhrán, vocal
- Matt Molloy – flute, tin whistle
- Jolyon Jackson – cello (tracks 1, 8 and 10)
