= The Year of the French (album) =

Studio album by The Chieftains
- Released: 1983
- Genre: Irish folk music
- Label: Claddagh Records (Ireland); Shanachie (USA); Interfusion (Australia)
- Producer: Paddy Moloney

The Chieftains chronology
The Chieftains 10: Cotton-Eyed Joe (1982)	The Year of the French (1983)	The Grey Fox (1983)

Professional ratings
Review scores
Source	Rating
Allmusic	4.5/5 stars

The Year of the French is an Irish folk album by The Chieftains. Produced by Paddy Moloney, it was recorded at Windmill Lane Studios, Dublin, in September 1982 and released in 1983.

On this album The Chieftains appeared with the RTÉ Concert Orchestra, conducted by Proinnsias O'Duinn, and with Ruairi Somers on bagpipes. All the music was composed and arranged by Paddy Moloney to accompany an RTḖ television series.

== Track listing ==
1. "Killala: The Main Theme" (Chieftains and Orchestra) (2:06)
2. "The French March" (Chieftains and Orchestra) (4:52)
3. "The McCarthy Theme" (Chieftains)/ "The Looting" (Orchestra) (3:41)
4. "Treacy's Barnyard Dance" (Chieftains) (5:34)
5. "The Irish March: March of the Mayomen"/ "Uillean Pipes Lament" (Chieftains and Orchestra) (3:11)
6. "Killala: The Main Theme" (Chieftains and Orchestra) (2:01)
7. "The Irish March: March of the Mayomen" (bagpipes, Chieftains and Orchestra) (3:20)
8. "Cúnla" (song)/ "The Yearling Fair Reel" (fiddle) (3:06)
9. "Killala: The Opening Theme" (uilleann pipes and Orchestra)/ "Killala: The Coach Ride" (Chieftains) (4:03)
10. "The Bolero: McCarthy's Arrest" (Orchestra) (1:36)
11. "The McCarthy Theme" (flute and harp)/ "The Wandering" (Orchestra) (3:52)
12. "The French March" (Chieftains and Orchestra)/ "Cooper's Tune" (Orchestra) (2:31)
13. "The Hanging"/ "Sean O'Di" (Chieftains) (2:45)
14. "Killala: The Main Theme" (Chieftains and Orchestra) (2:08)

== Personnel ==
- Paddy Moloney – uilleann pipes, tin whistle
- Seán Keane – fiddle
- Martin Fay – fiddle, bones
- Derek Bell – harp, tiompán
- Kevin Conneff – bodhrán, vocals
- Matt Molloy – flute
