= The Chieftains 2 =

Studio album by The Chieftains
- Released: 1969
- Recorded: April 1969
- Studio: Craighall Studios, Edinburgh
- Genre: Irish folk music
- Length: 46:14
- Label: Claddagh
- Producer: Paddy Moloney

The Chieftains chronology
The Chieftains (1964)	The Chieftains 2 (1969)	The Chieftains 3 (1971)

Professional ratings
Review scores
Source	Rating
Allmusic	4/5 stars

Chieftains 2 is the second album released by the Irish musical group The Chieftains in 1969. It was Peadar Mercier's album debut on bodhran and Seán Keane's on fiddle.

When Seán Ó Riada disbanded Ceoltoiri Chualann in 1969, several of the players wanted to continue the sound they had pioneered. The result was the reformation of The Chieftains. "The Foxhunt" had previously been known as a piper's tune, but here it was given a full band treatment, and was widely played, as a direct result of this recording.

== Track listing ==
1. "Banish Misfortune / Gillian's Apples" – 3:35
2. "Seóirse Brabston (Planxty George Brabazon)" – 3:30
3. "Bean an Fhir Rua (The Red-Haired Man's Wife)" – 2:51
4. "Pis Fhliuch (The Wet Quirn) (O' Farrells Welcome to Limerick)" – 3:35
5. "An Páistín Fionn (The Fair-Haired Child)/ Mrs. Crotty's Reel / The Mountain Top" – 4:13
6. "The Foxhunt" – 5:15
7. "An Mhaighdean Mhara (The Sea Maiden) / Tie the Bonnet / O' Rourke's Reel" – 4:15
8. "Callaghan's Hornpipe / Byrne's Hornpipe" – 3:15
9. "Pigtown / Tie the Ribbons / The Bag of Potatoes" – 2:35
10. "The Humours of Whiskey / Hardiman the Fiddler" – 2:55
11. "Dónall Óg" – 3:56
12. "Brian Boru's March" – 3:14
13. "Sweeney's / Denis Murphy's / The Scartaglen Polka" – 3:30

== Personnel ==
The Chieftains

- Paddy Moloney – uilleann pipes, tin whistle, arrangements
- Martin Fay – fiddle
- Seán Potts – tin whistle
- Seán Keane – fiddle
- Michael Tubridy – flute, concertina, tin whistle
- Peadar Mercier – bodhrán, bones

Technical

- Edward Delaney - artwork
- John S. Perrett - design
- Iona Print Ltd., Glasnevin, Dublin 9 - lithography

== Sources and links ==
- "The Chieftains : Discography". Archived from the original on 27 June 2006.
