= The Chieftains Live! =

Live album by The Chieftains
- Released: 1977
- Recorded: December 1976
- Venue: Symphony Hall, Boston; Massey Hall, Toronto
- Genre: Irish folk music
- Length: 51:43
- Label: Claddagh
- Producer: Paddy Moloney

The Chieftains chronology
The Chieftains 7 (1977)	The Chieftains Live! (1977)	The Chieftains 8 (1978)

Professional ratings
Review scores
Source	Rating
AllMusic	3.5/5 stars

The Chieftains Live! is the first album by the Chieftains which was recorded live. It was recorded on tour in December 1976 at Symphony Hall in Boston and Massey Hall in Toronto.

Although the album sold well, it is Paddy Moloney's least favorite album. Moloney was quoted as saying, "I don't know what they did to it technically, but I know it plays too fast!"

== Track listing ==
1. "The Morning Dew" - 3:32
2. "George Brabazon" - 2:56
3. "Kerry Slides" - 3:52
4. "Carrickfergus" - 3:49
5. "Carolan's Concerto" - 3:09
6. "The Foxhunt" - 4:42
7. "Round the House and Mind the Dresser" - 2:54
8. "Solos: Caitlin Trail / For The Sakes Of Old Decency / Carolan's Farewell To Music / Banish Misfortune / The Tarbolton / The Pinch Of Snuff / The Star Of Munster / The Flogging Reel" - 13:51
9. "Limerick's Lamentation" - 3:54
10. "O'Neill's March" - 3:37
11. "Ril Mhor" - 3:23

== Personnel ==
- Paddy Moloney - uilleann pipes, tin whistle
- Seán Potts - tin whistle, bodhrán, bones
- Seán Keane - fiddle, tin whistle
- Martin Fay - fiddle, bones
- Michael Tubridy - flute, concertina and tin whistle
- Derek Bell - neo-Irish harp, medieval harps, tiompán, oboe
- Kevin Conneff - bodhrán
