= The Chieftains 4 =

Studio album by The Chieftains
- Released: 1973
- Recorded: September 1972 – February 1973
- Studios: Morgan, London, UK
- Genre: Irish folk music
- Length: 40:08
- Label: Claddagh
- Producer: Paddy Moloney

The Chieftains chronology
The Chieftains 3 (1971)	The Chieftains 4 (1973)	The Chieftains 5 (1975)

Professional ratings
Review scores
Source	Rating
Allmusic	5/5 stars

The Chieftains 4 is an album by The Chieftains. It is the first album to feature Derek Bell on the harp. This album is where The Chieftains' modern sound began.

== Track listing ==
All tracks traditional compositions; except where indicated

1. "Drowsy Maggie" – 4:00
2. "Morgan Magan" – 2:53
3. "The Tip of the Whistle" – 2:57
4. "Bucks of Oranmore" – 2:17
5. "The Battle of Aughrim" – 7:36
6. "The Morning Dew" (Paddy Moloney) – 3:34
7. "Carrickfergus (or Do Bhi Bean Uasal)" – 2:49
8. "Sláinte Bhreagh Hiulit (Hewlett)" – 2:34
9. "Cherish The Ladies" – 2:29
10. "Lord Mayo" – 2:44
11. "Mná na hÉireann (Women of Ireland)" (Seán Ó Riada) – 3:33
12. "O'Keefe's Slide /An Suisin Ban (The white blanket) / The Star Above The Garter / The Weaver's Slide" – 3:39

== Personnel ==
The Chieftains

- Paddy Moloney - uilleann pipes, tin whistle, arrangements, musical director
- Martin Fay - fiddle, bones
- Seán Potts - tin whistle
- Seán Keane - fiddle
- Peadar Mercier - bodhran, bones
- Derek Bell - harp
- Michael Tubridy - flute, concertina, tin whistle

Technical

- Paul Tregurtha - recording
- Edward Delaney - cover painting

== Legacy ==
The arrival of Derek Bell on harp gave The Chieftains a distinctive delicate sound. The slow air "Mná na hÉireann" (Women of Ireland), composed by Seán Ó Riada, was used in Stanley Kubrick's 1975 film Barry Lyndon. In 1996 Mike Oldfield recorded it on his album Voyager but credited it to "Traditional".
