= Irish Heartbeat =

Studio album by Van Morrison and The Chieftains
- Released: 1988
- Recorded: September 1987 – January 1988
- Studio: Windmill Lane, Dublin, Ireland
- Genre: Traditional Irish folk; folk rock
- Length: 38:44
- Label: Mercury
- Producer: Van Morrison, Paddy Moloney

Van Morrison chronology
Poetic Champions Compose (1987)	Irish Heartbeat (1988)	Avalon Sunset (1989)

The Chieftains chronology
In Ireland (1987)	Irish Heartbeat (1988)	The Tailor of Gloucester (1988)

Singles from Irish Heartbeat
- 1. "I'll Tell Me Ma" b/w "Tá Mo Chleamhnas Déanta" Released: June 1988

The eighteenth studio album Irish Heartbeat by Northern Irish singer-songwriter Van Morrison is a collaboration with the traditional Irish musical group the Chieftains, released in 1988. It was recorded at Windmill Lane Studios in Dublin, Ireland, and reached number 18 in the UK album charts.

== Recording ==
The album was recorded on dates from September to December 1987 and in January 1988. The Chieftains and Van Morrison had met years before at the Edinburgh rock festival. They joined up in Belfast during Morrison's No Guru tour and afterwards, Morrison and Paddy Moloney discussed recording an album together during a walk. They each had a list of songs and reached a consensus to cover two of Morrison's previously released tracks (the title track was one) and the rest from traditional Irish songs.

Recalled Moloney:

I think at that time Van was searching for his Irish roots. It was this man of blues, of rock ‘n’ roll, jazz and more importantly soul, coming home to his Irishness with The Chieftains and the music we’d been playing for so many years. Musically we were going to meet each other half way.

In October 1987 they performed together at Balmoral Studio in Belfast. The concert was broadcast on St. Patrick's Day in 1988.

== Composition ==
The album consists of seven Irish and one Scottish (Marie's Wedding) traditional folk songs, plus re-workings of the Morrison songs "Celtic Ray" (which first appeared on 1982's Beautiful Vision) and the title track "Irish Heartbeat" (which first appeared on 1983's Inarticulate Speech of the Heart). "Carrickfergus" is described as "a melancholic air worthy of Otis Redding" by critic Denis Campbell. "On Raglan Road" was adapted from a poem by Patrick Kavanagh and is the story of "a man ensnared by a beautiful revenant whom he had mistaken for 'a creature made of clay'." In 1994, Billy Connolly recorded a live cover of the song "Irish Heartbeat" during his World Tour of Scotland. The performance was used as the closing theme to the BBC series.

== Critical reception ==
Professional ratings
Review scores
Source	Rating
AllMusic	4.5/5 stars
The Encyclopedia of Popular Music	4/5 stars
Rolling Stone	4/5 stars
The Rolling Stone Album Guide	3.5/5 stars
The Village Voice	C+

Irish Heartbeat received positive reviews from most critics, one of whom called it "some of the most haunting, rousing, downright friendly music of the year". Rolling Stone magazine's David Browne said it has "splendor and intense beauty", while John Wilde from Melody Maker hailed it as "a bloody considerable marvel", having "awakened [Morrison's] roisterous spirit". In The Village Voice, Robert Christgau was more critical and believed that Morrison, suffering a creative block, was "misguided" in his attempt to reconnect with his traditional Irish music roots.

In the annual Pazz & Jop critics poll, Irish Heartbeat was voted the 29th best album of 1988. The NME named it the second greatest album of the year. In The Rolling Stone Album Guide (2004), Rob Sheffield said it showed Morrison in a livelier, more enthusiastic state than on his previous records during the 1980s.

== Track listing ==
All songs traditional, arranged by Van Morrison and Paddy Moloney, except as indicated.

=== Side one ===
1. "Star of the County Down" – 2:41
2. "Irish Heartbeat" (Morrison) – 3:52
3. "Tá Mo Chleamhnas Déanta (My Match It Is Made)" – 3:31
4. "Raglan Road" (lyrics by Patrick Kavanagh) – 4:43
5. "She Moved Through the Fair" – 4:44

=== Side two ===
1. "I'll Tell Me Ma" – 2:29
2. "Carrickfergus" – 4:23
3. "Celtic Ray" (Morrison) – 3:47
4. "My Lagan Love" – 5:19
5. "Marie's Wedding" – 3:17

== Charts ==
Chart (1988)	Peak position
Australia (Kent Music Report)	26
American Albums Chart	102
United Kingdom (Official Albums Chart)	18

== Personnel ==
- Van Morrison – lead vocals, guitar, drums
- Paddy Moloney – uilleann pipes, tin whistle
- Martin Fay – fiddle, bones
- Derek Bell – harp, keyboards, tiompán
- Kevin Conneff – bodhran, co-lead vocals on "Star of the County Down", "Tá Mo Chleamhnas Déanta" and "I'll Tell Me Ma"
- Matt Molloy – flute
- Seán Keane – fiddle
- Ciarán Ó Braonáin – bass
- Mary Black – backing vocals on "Marie's Wedding" and "Tá Mo Chleamhnas Déanta"
- Maura O'Connell – backing vocals on "Marie's Wedding"
- June Boyce – backing vocals on "Celtic Ray", "Irish Heartbeat" and "Marie's Wedding"
