= The Chieftains 5 =

Studio album by The Chieftains
- Released: 1975
- Studio: Sound Techniques, Chelsea, London
- Genre: Irish folk music
- Length: 44:39
- Label: Claddagh, Island
- Producer: Paddy Moloney

The Chieftains chronology
The Chieftains 4 (1973)	The Chieftains 5 (1975)	The Chieftains 6: Bonaparte's Retreat (1976)

Professional ratings
Review scores
Source	Rating
AllMusic	4.5/5 stars
The Encyclopedia of Popular Music	3/5 stars
MusicHound Folk: The Essential Album Guide	2/5 stars
The Rolling Stone Album Guide	3.5/5 stars

The Chieftains 5 is an album by The Chieftains, released in 1975. It was the band's first album as a professional group. Derek Bell played the tiompan (the Irish hammered dulcimer) for the first time on this album. It marked the last album appearance of Peader Mercier.

== Critical reception ==
The New York Times called the album "highly innovative" and the music "quite descriptive," praising the "wild jigs and reels, impish hornpipes and raucous slides."

== Track listing ==
1. "The Timpán Reel" – 3:12
2. "Tabhair dom do Lámh (Give me your Hand)" – 2:37
3. "Three Kerry Polkas" – 2:54
4. "Ceol Bhriotánach (Breton Music)" – 5:08
5. "The Chieftains' Knock on the Door" – 7:16
6. "The Robber's Glen" – 3:51
7. "An Ghé agus Grá Geal (The Goose & Bright Love)" – 3:23
8. "The Humours of Carolan" – 8:26
9. "Samhradh, Samhradh (Summertime, Summertime)" – 4:07
10. "Kerry Slides" – 3:45

== Personnel ==
The Chieftains

- Paddy Moloney - Uilleann pipes, tin whistle, arrangements, musical direction
- Peadar Mercier - bodhrán, bones
- Ronnie McShane - bones
- Martin Fay - fiddle
- Seán Keane - fiddle
- Michael Tubridy - flute, concertina, tin whistle
- Derek Bell - harp, oboe, timpani
- Seán Potts - tin whistle

== Charts ==
Chart (1975–1976)	Peak position
Australian Albums (Kent Music Report)	73
US (Billboard Top LPs & Tape)	187
