= The Chieftains 6: Bonaparte's Retreat =

Studio album by The Chieftains
- Released: 1976
- Genre: Irish folk music
- Length: 48:19
- Label: Claddagh
- Producer: Paddy Moloney

The Chieftains chronology
The Chieftains 5 (1975)	The Chieftains 6: Bonaparte's Retreat (1976)	The Chieftains 7 (1977)

Professional ratings
Review scores
Source	Rating
Allmusic	link

The Chieftains 6: Bonaparte's Retreat is an album by the Chieftains. It is their first album to include singing, featuring Dolores Keane. This album was the first time Kevin Conneff played on a Chieftains album, and was later to become a full member of the band.

== Track listing ==
1. "The Chattering Magpie" – 4:47
2. "An Chéad Mháirt den Fhombar (The First Tuesday of Autumn) and Green Grow the Rushes O" – 3:12
3. "Bonaparte's Retreat" – 14:37
4. "Away with Ye" – 4:26
5. "Caledonia" – 5:28
6. "Iníon Nic Diarmada (Miss MacDermott) or The Princess Royal Máire Dhall (Blind Mary) and John Drury" – 7:00
7. "The Rights of Man" – 3:21
8. "Round the House and Mind the Dresser" – 3:12

== Personnel ==
The Chieftains

- Paddy Moloney - uilleann pipes, tin whistle, bodhrán
- Seán Potts - tin whistle, bodhrán
- Martin Fay - fiddle
- Michael Tubridy - flute, concertina, tin whistle
- Derek Bell - harps, oboe, tiompán
- Seán Keane - fiddle
- Kevin Conneff - bodhrán
- Dolores Keane - vocals

== Sources and Links ==
- The Chieftains 6: Bonaparte's Retreat at AllMusic
