= The Chieftains 10: Cotton-Eyed Joe =

The Chieftains 10

Studio album by The Chieftains
- Released: 1981
- Studio: Windmill Lane, Dublin, Ireland
- Genre: Irish folk music
- Label: Claddagh (Ireland); Shanachie Records (United States)
- Producer: Paddy Moloney

The Chieftains chronology
The Chieftains 9: Boil the Breakfast Early (1980)	The Chieftains 10 (1981)	The Year of the French (1981)

Professional ratings
Review scores
Source	Rating
AllMusic	4.5/5 stars

The Chieftains 10 is an Irish folk album by The Chieftains. It was released in 1981. The original release was simply titled 'The Chieftains 10'; a reissue on the Shanachie label added the subtitle 'Cotton-Eyed Joe' and had a different cover featuring a photograph of the band.

== Track listing ==
1. "The Christmas Reel" (3:00)
2. "Salut a la Compagnie" (3:19)
3. "My Love Is in America" (4:30)
4. "Manx Music" (3:38)
5. "Master Crowley's Reels" (1:30)
6. "The Pride of Pimlico" (2:04)
7. "An Faire (The Gold Ring)" (3:38)
8. "An Durzhunel (The Turtle Dove)" (6:45)
9. "Sir Arthur Shaen and Madam Cole" (4.00)
10. "Garech's Wedding" (1:35)
11. "Cotton-Eyed Joe" (2:15)

== Personnel ==
- Paddy Moloney – uilleann pipes, tin whistle
- Seán Keane – fiddle
- Martin Fay – fiddle, bones
- Derek Bell – neo-Irish harp, medieval harps, tiompán
- Kevin Conneff – bodhrán, vocals
- Matt Molloy – flute, tin whistle
