= The Chieftains 7 =

Studio album by The Chieftains
- Released: 1977
- Genre: Irish folk music
- Length: 43:43
- Label: Claddagh
- Producer: Paddy Moloney

The Chieftains chronology
The Chieftains 6: Bonaparte's Retreat (1976)	The Chieftains 7 (1977)	The Chieftains Live! (1977)

Professional ratings
Review scores
Source	Rating
Allmusic	3.5/5 stars

Chieftains 7 or The Chieftains 7 is an album by The Chieftains, the first album which featured Kevin Conneff as a full member of the band. In 1995 The Chieftains re-recorded the track "O'Sullivan's March" for the soundtrack to the movie Rob Roy starring Liam Neeson and Jessica Lange.

== Track listing ==
1. "Away We Go Again" – 6:22
2. "Dochas" – 3:47
3. "Hedigan's Fancy" – 3:47
4. "John O'Connor and the Ode to Whiskey" – 2:38
5. "Friel's Kitchen" – 4:41
6. "No. 6 The Coombe" – 3:50
7. "O'Sullivan's March" – 4:00
8. "The Ace and the Deuce of Pipering" – 3:23
9. "The Fairies' Lamentation And Dance" – 6:52
10. "Oh! The Breeches Full of Stitches" – 4:21

== Personnel ==
- Paddy Moloney - uilleann pipes, tin whistle
- Seán Potts - tin whistle, bones
- Seán Keane - fiddle, tin whistle
- Martin Fay - fiddle, bones
- Michael Tubridy - flute, concertina and tin whistle
- Derek Bell - neo-Irish harp, medieval harps, tiompán, oboe
- Kevin Conneff - bodhrán
