= Celtic Wedding =

Studio album by The Chieftains
- Released: 1987
- Recorded: May 1986
- Studio: Lansdowne, Dublin
- Genre: Breton; folk
- Label: RCA
- Producer: Paddy Moloney

The Chieftains chronology
Ballad of the Irish Horse (1986)	Celtic Wedding (1987)	In Ireland (1987)

Celtic Wedding is an album of traditional Breton music performed by the Irish band The Chieftains. The album features guest performances by Breton artists Nolwen Monjarret, Bernard Pichard, Alain Guerton and Michel Bertae. The recording of "A Breton Carol" featuring Nolwen Monjarret later appeared on the Chieftains' 1991 album, The Bells of Dublin.

The album's liner notes state that the music was selected from a publication entitled Tonioù Breizh-Izel (Traditional Tunes from Lower Brittany), which contains over 3,000 tunes collected by Polig Monjarret, who collaborated with Paddy Moloney in choosing the tunes for the album. The original album's cover features a painting by the Scottish painter Alexander Goudie of a country fair attended by people and animals. This was later changed in more recent reprints to a cover photo of windblown rocks. The making of the album was sponsored by Brittany Ferries.

Celtic Wedding was nominated for a Grammy Award in 1988.

== Track listing ==
All songs traditional. Descriptions from the album's liner notes.

=== Side one ===
No.	Title	Length
1.	"Dans Mod Koh a Vaod" (Old-fashioned dance)	3:30
2.	"A Breton Carol"	3:41
3.	"Dans-Tro Fisel" (Dance from the Fisel country)	4:06
4.	"Marches" (From the Vannes country)	4:09
5.	"Dans Bro-Leon" (Dance and song from the Leon country)	2:28
6.	"Heuliadenn Tonioù Breizh-Izel" (A medley in which each member of the band plays a tune of his own choice)	6:57

=== Side two ===
No.	Title	Length
1.	"Ev Chistr 'Ta, Laou!" (Cider-drinking song)	1:56
2.	"Jabadaw" (Dance from Breton Cornwall)	3:03
3.	"Celtic Wedding" (A medley of song and dance describing the famous ancient Breton ceremony)	20:11

== Personnel ==
- Derek Bell – harp, tiompán, oboe, organ
- Martin Fay – fiddle, bones
- Seán Keane – fiddle
- Kevin Conneff – bodhrán, vocals
- Matt Molloy – flute, tin whistle
- Paddy Moloney – uilleann pipes, tin whistle
- Nolwenn Monjarret – vocals
- Bernard Pichard – bombarde
- Alain Guerton – bombarde, biniou
- Michel Bertae – bombarde, biniou
