= The Bells of Dublin =

Studio album by The Chieftains
- Released: 1991
- Recorded: 1991, Windmill Lane Studios, Dublin, Christ Church Cathedral, Dublin, St Anne's Cathedral, Belfast, Soundtrack Studio, Boston, Topanga Skyline Studio, California
- Genre: Irish folk; Christmas
- Length: 62:58
- Label: RCA Victor
- Producer: Paddy Moloney

The Chieftains chronology
Over the Sea To Skye: The Celtic Connection (1990)	The Bells of Dublin (1991)	Another Country (1992)

The Bells of Dublin is a 1991 album of Christmas songs and traditional carols by the Irish band The Chieftains. The album features guest performances by various artists, including Elvis Costello, Jackson Browne, Kate & Anna McGarrigle, Marianne Faithfull, Nanci Griffith, Rickie Lee Jones and the actor Burgess Meredith.

Writing in the album's liner notes, Paddy Moloney said, "These recording sessions hold special memories for The Chieftains and myself, and bring together all the colours of this festive season."

== Track listing ==
All songs traditional, except as indicated.

1. "The Bells of Dublin; Christmas Eve" (with the bell-ringers of Christ Church Cathedral, Dublin) (Paddy Moloney)
2. "Past Three O'Clock" (with The Renaissance Singers)
3. "St. Stephen's Day Murders" (with Elvis Costello) (P. Moloney, E. Costello)
4. "Il Est Né/Ca Berger" (with Kate and Anna McGarrigle)
5. "Don Oíche Úd i mBeithil" (with Burgess Meredith)
6. "I Saw Three Ships A Sailing" (with Marianne Faithfull)
7. "A Breton Carol" (with Nolwen Monjarret) (from Celtic Wedding)
8. "Carols Medley: O the Holly She Bears a Berry/God Rest Ye Merry Gentlemen/The Boar's Head"
9. "The Wexford Carol" (with Nanci Griffith) (from A Chieftains Celebration)
10. "The Rebel Jesus" (with Jackson Browne) (J. Browne)
11. "Skyline Jig" (P. Moloney)
12. "O Holy Night" (with Rickie Lee Jones)
13. "Medley: 'The Wren! The Wren!'/The Dingle Set – Dance/The Wren in the Furze/A Dance Duet – Reels/Brafferton Village/Walsh's Hornpipe/The Farewell" ("Wren in the Furze" by Kevin Conneff)
14. "Medley: Once in Royal David's City/Ding Dong Merrily on High/O Come All Ye Faithful" (with The Renaissance Singers)

== Personnel ==
- Derek Bell – harp, tiompán, harpsichord
- Martin Fay – fiddle
- Seán Keane – fiddle
- Kevin Conneff – bodhrán, vocals
- Matt Molloy – flute
- Paddy Moloney – uilleann pipes, tin whistle
- The Renaissance Singers – vocals
- Ronnie Lee – choirmaster
- Elvis Costello – vocals
- Jackson Browne – vocals, piano
- Kate McGarrigle – vocals
- Anna McGarrigle – vocals
- Burgess Meredith – narration
- Marianne Faithfull – vocals
- Nolwen Monjarret – vocals
- Phil Callery – vocals
- Fran McPhail – vocals
- Gerry Cullen – vocals
- Nanci Griffith – vocals
- Rickie Lee Jones – vocals
- Suzie Katayama – cello
- Brendan Begley – accordion
- Kathryn Tickell – northumbrian pipes
- David Drinkel – organ, St Anne's Cathedral, Belfast
- Bell-ringers of Christ Church Cathedral, Dublin

== Certifications ==
Region	Certification	Certified units/sales
United States (RIAA)	Gold	500,000^{^}
^{^} Shipments figures based on certification alone.
