= Santiago (album) =

Studio album by The Chieftains
- Released: 1996
- Genre: World; Latin/Celtic; Celtic fusion; Galician folk; Cuban folk; Mexican folk; Irish folk
- Length: 57:43
- Label: RCA
- Producer: Paddy Moloney

The Chieftains chronology
Film Cuts (1996)	Santiago (1996)	Long Journey Home

Santiago is an album by The Chieftains, released through RCA Records in 1996. The album is dedicated to traditional music of Galicia, the region in the northwest of Spain, and also adaptation of Galician emigrants' musical folklore in Latin American music, for example, in the music of Mexico and Cuba. As Paddy Moloney noted in the CD's booklet, Galicia is "the world's most undiscovered Celtic country".

The album features collaborations with Carlos Núñez, Linda Ronstadt, Los Lobos, Ry Cooder, Eliot Fisk, Richard Egües, Pancho Amat, Kepa Junkera, Júlio Pereira, (among others). In 1997, the album earned the group the Grammy Award for Best World Music Album.

== Track listing ==
No.	Title	Writer(s)	Length
1.	"Pilgrimage to Santiago, pt, 1: Txalaparta"	traditional	1:16
2.	"Pilgrimage to Santiago, pt, 2: Arku-Dantza / Arin-Arin"	traditional	4:21
3.	"Pilgrimage to Santiago, pt, 3: El Besu (The Kiss)"	traditional	2:19
4.	"Pilgrimage to Santiago, pt, 4: Não Vas Ao Mar, Toino (Don't Go to the Sea, Toino)"	traditional	2:02
5.	"Pilgrimage to Santiago, pt, 5: Dum Pater Familias / Ad Honorem"	traditional	3:13
6.	"Dueling Chanters (Sixpenny Money / Polka de Vilagarcia)"	traditional	2:53
7.	"Galician Overture"	Paddy Moloney	11:01
8.	"Guadalupe" (with Linda Ronstadt and Los Lobos)	traditional	2:50
9.	"Minho Waltz"	traditional, arr. Matt Molloy	3:21
10.	"Setting Sail / Muiñeira de Frexido"	traditional, arr. P. Moloney	3:26
11.	"Maneo"	traditional	3:28
12.	"Santiago de Cuba" (with Ry Cooder)	traditional, arr. P. Moloney	3:37
13.	"Galleguita / Tutankhamen" (with Ry Cooder)	traditional	4:07
14.	"Tears of Stone"	traditional	2:40
15.	"Dublin in Vigo" (Medley: a) Alborada Gallega; b) Miudiño; c)Lola; d) Jackson's Morning Brush; e) Muiñeira de Cabana; f) Muiñeira de Chantada)	traditional	7:07

== Personnel ==
- Derek Bell - harp, tiompán, harpsichord
- Martin Fay - fiddle
- Seán Keane - fiddle
- Kevin Conneff - bodhrán, vocals
- Matt Molloy - flute
- Paddy Moloney - uilleann pipes, tin whistle
