= Another Country (The Chieftains album) =

Studio album by The Chieftains (among others)
- Released: 29 September 1992
- Recorded: 9 March—28 April 1992
- Studio: Nashville, Tennessee; Windmill Lane, Dublin, Ireland
- Genre: Celtic folk; country folk; bluegrass
- Length: 51:10
- Label: RCA Victor
- Producer: Paddy Moloney

The Chieftains (among others) chronology
The Bells of Dublin (1991)	Another Country (1992)	An Irish Evening (1992)

Professional ratings
Review scores
Source	Rating
Allmusic	4/5 stars
Rambles	(favorable)

Another Country is a 1992 album by The Chieftains. It is a collaboration between the Irish band and many top country music musicians including Ricky Skaggs, Don Williams, Colin James, Emmylou Harris, members from The Nitty Gritty Dirt Band, Willie Nelson, Chet Atkins and Sam Bush. The album won the 1993 Grammy Award for Best Contemporary Folk Album and was nominated in three other categories: Best Pop Instrumental Performance (for "Tahitian Skies"), Best Country Vocal Collaboration (for "Killybegs"), and Best Country Instrumental Performance (for "Cotton Eyed Joe"). The Chieftains also took home the Award for Best Traditional Folk Album that year for their 1992 live album, An Irish Evening. There was also an Another Country documentary with video footage of the performances.

== Track listing ==
1. "Happy to Meet" (Moloney) - 3:03
2. "I Can't Stop Loving You" (Gibson) - 3:26 [performance with Don Williams]
3. "Wabash Cannonball/Morning Dew/Father Kelly's Reels" (Moloney, Traditional) - 3:22 [performance with Ricky Skaggs]
4. "Heartbreak Hotel/The Cliffs of Moher Jig" (Axton, Durden, Presley/traditional) - 3:19 [performance with Chet Atkins]
5. "Goodnight Irene" (Leadbelly, Lomax) - 4:16 [performance with Willie Nelson]
6. "Cúnla" (Traditional) - 3:36 [performance with Colin James]
7. "Nobody's Darling But Mine" (Davis, Pruett) - 3:37 [performance with Emmylou Harris]
8. "Cotton Eyed Joe" (Traditional) - 2:37 [performance with Ricky Skaggs]
9. "Tahitian Skies" (Flacke) - 3:28 [performance with Chet Atkins]
10. "Killybegs" (Ibbotson, Moloney) - 3:40 [performance with members from The Nitty Gritty Dirt Band]
11. "Paddy's Green Shamrock Shore" (Traditional) - 4:40 [performance with Kevin Conneff]
12. "Finale: Did You Ever Go-A-Courtin', Uncle Joe/Will the Circle Be Unbroken" (Traditional) - 12:06 [performance with Ricky Skaggs, Emmylou Harris and members from The Nitty Gritty Dirt Band]

== Personnel ==
- Derek Bell - harp, tiompán, keyboards
- Martin Fay - fiddle
- Seán Keane - fiddle
- Kevin Conneff - bodhrán, vocals
- Matt Molloy - flute
- Paddy Moloney - uilleann pipes, tin whistle
- Guests:
- Jimmy Ibbotson - Guitar, vocals (1,10,12)
- Jeff Hanna - Guitar, vocals (1,10,12)
- Jimmy Fadden - Drums, harmonica (1,10,12)
- Don Williams - Guitar, vocals (2)
- Ricky Skaggs - Guitar, mandolin, vocals (3,8,12)
- Chet Atkins - Guitar (4,9,12)
- Willie Nelson - Vocals (5)
- Emmylou Harris - Vocals (7,12)
