= The Chieftains 3 =

Studio album by The Chieftains
- Released: 1971
- Studio: AIR, London
- Genre: Irish folk music
- Length: 41:44
- Label: Claddagh
- Producer: Paddy Moloney

The Chieftains chronology
The Chieftains 2 (1969)	The Chieftains 3 (1971)	The Chieftains 4 (1973)

Professional ratings
Review scores
Source	Rating
Allmusic	2.5/5 stars

The Chieftains 3 is the third album released by the Irish musical group The Chieftains in 1971.

The tight formula of the first two albums loosened up on the third album. For the first time there was a mazurka (which on the original vinyl release, on the record itself, was erroneously labelled "Sonny's Maxurka"). There is still no singing, but Pat Kilduff added lilting on two tracks.

== Track listing ==
1. "Strike the Gay Harp / Tiarna Maigheó (Lord Mayo) / The Lady on the Island / The Sailor on the Rock" – 6:24
2. "Sonny's Mazurka / Tommy Hunt's Jig" – 3:12
3. "Eibhlí Gheal Chiún ní Chearbhaill (Bright Quiet Eily O'Carroll) / Delahunty's Hornpipe" – 3:55
4. "The Hunter's Purse" – 1:42
5. "March of the King of Laois" or "Ruairí Óg Ó Mordha" – 3:02
6. "Carolan's Concerto or Mrs Poer" – 2:49
7. "Tom Billy's Reel / The Road to Lisdoonvarna / The Merry Sisters" – 5:57
8. "An Ghaoth Aneas (The South Wind)" – 2:49
9. "Tiarna Isne Chaoin (Lord Inchiquin)" – 3:41
10. "The Trip to Sligo" – 3:43
11. "An Raibh Tú ag an gCarraig? (Were You at the Rock?)" – 2:20
12. "John Kelly's Slide / Merrily Kiss the Quaker / Denis Murphy's Slide" – 3:25

== Personnel ==
The Chieftains

- Paddy Moloney - uilleann pipes, tin whistle, arrangements, conductor
- Michael Tubridy - flute, concertina, tin whistle
- Seán Potts - tin whistle
- Martin Fay - fiddle
- Seán Keane - fiddle
- Peadar Mercier - bodhrán, bones

with:

- Pat Kilduff - lilting on "The Hunter's Purse" and "Merrily Kiss The Quaker"
- Producer: Gareth a Brun (Garech Browne)
- Liner notes by Seán MacRéamoinn, Hamish Henderson and Susannah York.

== Sources and links ==
- "The Chieftains : Discography". Archived from the original on 19 November 2006.
