= The Long Black Veil (album) =

Studio album by The Chieftains
- Released: 24 January 1995
- Studio: Lake House, England; Windmill Lane, Dublin, Ireland; Westland, Dublin, Ireland; Clinton, New York City, US; Utility Muffin Research Kitchen, Los Angeles, California
- Genre: Folk
- Length: 58:51
- Label: RCA Victor
- Producer: Paddy Moloney (with Chris Kimsey and Ry Cooder)

The Chieftains chronology
| The Celtic Harp: A Tribute to Edward Bunting (1993) | The Long Black Veil (1995) | Film Cuts (1996) |

Professional ratings
Review scores
| Source | Rating |
|---|---|
| Allmusic | 4.5/5 stars |
| Rolling Stone | 4/5 stars |

The Long Black Veil is an album by the traditional Irish folk band The Chieftains. Released in 1995, it is one of the most popular and best-selling albums by the band. It reached number 17 in the album charts. The band teamed up with well-known musicians such as Mick Jagger of the Rolling Stones and Van Morrison. The album went gold in the U.S. and Australia, and Double-Platinum in Ireland.

Credited collaborators include Marianne Faithfull, Mark Knopfler, Mick Jagger, Ry Cooder, Sinéad O'Connor, Sting, The Rolling Stones, Tom Jones, Van Morrison and Arty McGlynn.

The Tennessee Waltz/Mazurka was recorded at Frank Zappa's studio not long before he died. There is video evidence (available as a bootleg called 'Salad Party') that additional material was recorded during this session, though The Chieftains have not released this material.

== Track listing ==
1. "Mo Ghile Mear" (Our Hero) (with Sting & Anúna) – 3:22
2. "The Long Black Veil" (with Mick Jagger) – 3:38
3. "The Foggy Dew" (with Sinéad O'Connor) – 5:20
4. "Have I Told You Lately" (with Van Morrison) – 4:40
5. "Changing Your Demeanour" – 3:16
6. "The Lily of the West" (with Mark Knopfler) – 5:10
7. "Coast of Malabar" (with Ry Cooder) – 6:01
8. "Dunmore Lassies" (with Ry Cooder) – 5:14
9. "Love Is Teasin'" (with Marianne Faithfull) – 4:36
10. "He Moved through the Fair" (with Sinéad O'Connor) – 4:54
11. "Ferny Hill" – 3:43
12. "Tennessee Waltz/Tennessee Mazurka" (with Tom Jones) – 3:58
13. "The Rocky Road to Dublin" (with The Rolling Stones) – 5:06

== Personnel ==
The Chieftains

- Martin Fay – fiddle
- Seán Keane – fiddle
- Kevin Conneff – bodhrán, vocals
- Matt Molloy – flute
- Paddy Moloney – uilleann pipes, tin whistle
- Derek Bell – harp, tiompán, keyboards

Additional personnel

- Colin James - guitar, mandolin
- Dominic Miller, Paul Brady, Arty McGlynn, Foggy Little - guitar
- Kieran Hanrahan - banjo
- Terry Tulley - Scottish pipes
- Carlos Nunez - Galician pipes
- Brendan Begley, James Keane, Martin O'Connor - accordion
- Steve Cooney - didgeridoo
- Wally Minko - piano
- James Blennerhassett, Ned Mann - acoustic bass
- Joe Csibi, Darryl Jones, Nicky Scott - bass
- Noel Eccles, Tommy Igoe, Liam Bradley - drums
- Jean Butler - foot percussion
- Anúna, Brian Masterson, The Rolling Stones, Van Morrison, Sting, Ry Cooder, Mark Knopfler, Sinéad O'Connor, Phil Coulter, Marianne Faithfull, Tom Jones - backing vocals

== Charts ==
| Chart (2002) | Peak position |
|---|---|
| Australian Albums (ARIA Charts) | 11 |

== Certifications and sales ==
| Region | Certification | Certified units/sales |
|---|---|---|
| Australia (ARIA) | Gold | 35,000^{^} |
| United Kingdom (BPI) | Silver | 60,000^{^} |
| United States (RIAA) | Gold | 692,000 |
^{^} Shipments figures based on certification alone.

== Sources and links ==
- The Long Black Veil at AllMusic
- U2Wanderer.org
