= The Chieftains (album) =

Studio album by The Chieftains
- Released: 1964
- Studio: Peter Hunt Studios, Dublin
- Genre: Irish folk music
- Length: 41:59
- Label: Claddagh
- Producer: Paddy Moloney

The Chieftains chronology
| The Chieftains (1964) | The Chieftains 2 (1969) |

Professional ratings
Review scores
| Source | Rating |
|---|---|
| Allmusic | 2.5/5 stars |

The Chieftains is the first album released by the Irish musical group The Chieftains in 1964. The album is now sometimes referred to as The Chieftains 1 due to the numbering system of their subsequent albums. It was one of the first folk albums to be recorded in stereo.

== Track listing ==
All tracks Traditional compositions

1. "Sé Fáth mo Bhuartha / The Lark on the Strand / An Fhallaingín Mhuimhneach / Trim the Velvet" – 7:38
2. "An Comhra Donn / Murphy's Hornpipe" – 4:30
3. "Cailín na Gruaige Doinne" (The Brown-Haired Girl) – 2:40
4. "Comb Your Hair and Curl It / The Boys of Ballisodare" – 3:00
5. "The Musical Priest / The Queen of May" – 3:25
6. "The Walls of Liscarroll Jig" – 2:31
7. "An Dhruimfhionn Donn Dílis" – 2:00
8. "The Connemara Stocking / The Limestone Rock / Dan Breen's" – 2:40
9. "Casadh an tSúgan" – 3:38
10. "The Boy in the Gap" – 1:12
11. "Saint Mary's, Church Street / Garret Barry, The Battering Ram / Kitty goes a-Milking, Rakish Paddy" – 6:39

== Personnel ==
The Chieftains

- Paddy Moloney – uilleann pipes, tin whistle, arrangements, musical direction
- Martin Fay – fiddle
- Seán Potts – tin whistle
- Michael Tubridy – flute, concertina, tin whistle
- David Fallon – bodhrán

Technical

- Morgan O'Sullivan - recording engineer
- Edward Delaney - cover design

== Sources and links ==
- This album on the Chieftains' Official site
