= An Irish Evening =

An Irish Evening: Live at the Grand Opera House, Belfast

Live album by the Chieftains
- Released: 28 January 1992
- Recorded: 31 July and 1 August 1991
- Venues: Grand Opera House, Belfast
- Genre: Celtic
- Label: RCA Victor
- Producer: Paddy Moloney

The Chieftains chronology
Another Country (1992)	An Irish Evening: Live at the Grand Opera House, Belfast (1992)	The Celtic Harp: A Tribute To Edward Bunting (1993)

Professional ratings
Review scores
Source	Rating
AllMusic	link

An Irish Evening: Live at the Grand Opera House, Belfast is a 1992 album by the traditional Irish folk band the Chieftains. The album consists of a live recording of a concert (over two nights) in Belfast, Northern Ireland. The band invited on stage Roger Daltrey, lead vocalist of the English band the Who, and American folk singer Nanci Griffith to join them for several songs.

== Track listing ==
1. "Opening Medley: Dóchas/King of Laois/Paddy's Jig/O'Keefe's/Chattering Magpie" (Traditional) 9:17
2. "North Americay" (Traditional arranged by Kevin Conneff) 4:09
3. "Lilly Bolero/The White Cockade" (Traditional) 3:11
4. "Little Love Affairs" (with Nanci Griffith) (Nanci Griffith, James Hooker) 3:00
5. "Red is the Rose" (with Nanci Griffith) (Traditional) 3:26
6. "The Mason's Apron" (Traditional) 5:21
7. "The Stone" (Traditional) 6:31
8. "Miscellany: Theme from Tristan and Isolde/Súisín Ban/Good Morning Nightcap/The Galway Races/The Jolly Tinker" (Traditional arranged by Paddy Moloney) 8:56
9. "On Raglan Road" (with Roger Daltrey) (Traditional arranged by Paddy Moloney & Roger Daltrey; Lyrics by Patrick Kavanagh) 5:23
10. "Behind Blue Eyes" (with Roger Daltrey featuring Billy Nichols) (Pete Townshend) 4:24
11. "Medley: Ó Murchú's Hornpipe /Sliabh Geal gCua Na Feile" (Traditional) 4:17
12. "Damhsa" (featuring Jean Butler) (Traditional) 3:00
13. "Rachamíd a Bhean Bheag/Ford Econoline (with Nanci Griffith)/Any Old Iron" (with Roger Daltrey) (Traditional arranged by Paddy Moloney, Kevin Conneff, Sean Keane, Martin Fay, Derek Bell & Matt Molloy/Nanci Griffith/Traditional arranged by Roger Daltrey) 10:19
