= Garech Browne =

Irish art collector (1939–2018)

The Honourable Garech Browne
- Browne in 2017
- Born: Garech Domnagh Browne; 25 June 1939; Chapelizod, Dublin, Ireland
- Died: 10 March 2018 (aged 78); London, England
- Other names: Garech de Brún, Garech a Brún
- Occupation: Art collector
- Known for: Claddagh Records
- Parents: Dominick Browne (father); Oonagh Guinness (mother)
- Relatives: Tara Browne (brother)

Garech Domnagh Browne (25 June 1939 – 10 March 2018) was an Irish art collector and a notable patron of Irish arts, in particular traditional Irish music. He was the founder of Claddagh Records and was instrumental in the formation of The Chieftains. He was often known by a Gaelic translation of his English name, Garech de Brún, or alternatively Garech a Brún, especially in Ireland.

== Family and early life ==
Browne was born on 25 June 1939 at Glenmaroon House, on the edge of the Phoenix Park in Chapelizod, Dublin, the eldest of the three sons of Dominick Geoffrey Browne, 4th Baron Oranmore and Browne (1901–2002) and his second wife, Oonagh Browne (née Guinness), daughter of The Hon. Ernest Guinness, the second son of the 1st Earl of Iveagh. Oonagh was a wealthy heiress to the Guinness fortune and the youngest of the three "Golden Guinness Girls", along with her sisters Maureen and Aileen. Garech's father had the rare distinction of sitting in the House of Lords for 72 years, until his death at the age of 100 in August 2002, without ever speaking in a debate. At Browne's christening, held in St Patrick's Cathedral, Dublin, his seven sets of godparents included his aunts, his grandparents, and the inventor Guglielmo Marconi.

As both his parents were married three times, Garech had two stepmothers and two stepfathers, as well as a number of half-siblings, including two adopted siblings, Desmond and Manuela, from his mother's marriage to Miguel Ferreras, who was later found to have been a former Spanish fascist named José Marias Ozores Laredo. His only full brother, The Hon. Tara Browne, was a young London socialite whose death at the age of 21 in a car crash in London's West End helped inspire John Lennon when writing the song "A Day in the Life" with Paul McCartney.

Browne's early life was divided between his father's home at Castle MacGarrett, near Claremorris, County Mayo, and his mother's home at Luggala, set deep in the Wicklow Mountains in County Wicklow, which her father Ernest Guinness had bought for her as a wedding present around 1936, from Mervyn Richard Wingfield, 8th Viscount Powerscourt. Once fears that Luggala might be bombed during the Second World War had subsided, Browne spent long periods there as a child, recalling visits to the estate by diplomats and politicians, including Erskine Childers and the British representative to Éire, John Maffey. It was at Castle MacGarrett that Browne first developed his love of Irish traditional music, listening to a worker on the estate whistling tunes he found "magical", and following him around "like my own Pied Piper". He later recalled dancing to Irish music at around the age of three as one of his earliest and most vivid memories.

The family suffered a number of tragedies during Browne's childhood. In December 1943 his mother gave birth to a third son, who died two days later and was buried by the lake at Luggala with the grave marker "Baby Browne". Three years later, Tessa Kindersley, Oonagh's daughter from her first marriage, died within fifteen minutes of receiving a diphtheria vaccine and was also buried at Luggala. In January 1954, Luggala nearly burned to the ground in a fire caused by outdated electrical wiring, and restoration work began within weeks.

When Browne was eleven, his parents separated (their divorce was finalised in 1950). His father called him into his study and asked him to choose which parent he wished to live with; Browne chose his mother, reasoning that she would be more upset to lose him. Browne subsequently spent more time at Luggala, where his mother hosted lavish parties, more akin to salons, that brought together many Irish and British writers, artists and poets, including Seán O'Casey, Claud Cockburn, Lord Dunsany and Robert Kee, with whom Oonagh had a relationship for several years. The writer Brendan Behan, a frequent visitor, once remarked that one could say whatever one liked at Luggala, "so long as you don't take too long about it and it's said wittily".

== Education ==
Browne attended Castle Park school, in Dalkey, from the age of ten. He was set to sit the common entrance examination for Eton aged thirteen but failed it, and by the time he passed, his place had been lost; he was sent instead to Institut Le Rosey, an international boarding school near Lausanne, Switzerland, whose pupils at the time included the Aga Khan and Thady Wyndham-Quin, 7th Earl of Dunraven. Browne brought his time at the school to an abrupt end by sending himself a telegram purporting to be from his mother, reading: "Unforeseen circumstances. Come home immediately. Your loving mother".

He was next sent to Bryanston School in Dorset, on the recommendation of the artist Lucian Freud, who was married to Browne's cousin, Lady Caroline Blackwood. His time there was equally brief, and his formal education ended at the age of fifteen, giving rise to a joke that his only official qualifications were licences to drive a horse-cab and a car. He later described schools as "rehearsals for prison" and said the only things he had wanted to learn, "music, literature, real history", were not taught.

Browne considered himself largely self-taught, crediting his mother's guests at Luggala with his real education. The writer Derek Lindsay (A. E. Ellis) taught him about classical music and opera, Freud introduced him to Behan, Anthony Cronin and Patrick Swift, and Francis Bacon gave him a tour of the Louvre. Other guests at Luggala during his youth included the film director John Huston, the writer Liam O'Flaherty, and the British poets Robert Graves and Iris Tree.

== Discovery of Irish traditional music ==
Having abandoned formal schooling, the teenage Browne spent time in Paris, living in his mother's apartment, taking a course in French civilisation at the Sorbonne and studying French at the Berlitz school. One of his Berlitz teachers, who came from Brittany, asked him questions about Ireland that Browne found he was unable to answer; he later said it was this experience that led him to decide he ought to know more about his own country.

Around this time Browne visited Inishmore, one of the Aran Islands and the birthplace of the family friend Liam O'Flaherty. On the boat crossing he heard a woman humming and, struck by the tunes, approached her; she turned out to be the singer Máire Áine Ní Dhonnchadha, who had not realised she was singing aloud.

Browne had also begun listening to Irish traditional music broadcasts on Radio Éireann, in particular A Job of Journeywork, presented from 1955 by the folklorist Ciarán Mac Mathúna. Through family connections he met Mac Mathúna and travelled the country with him as he recorded traditional musicians singing and playing in private houses and local pubs.

In 1956, Browne bought a mews house on Quinn's Lane, off Pembroke Street, Dublin, and began frequenting the few venues in the city where live Irish music could be heard, such as The Brazen Head and the Pipers' Club on Thomas Street. He also attended fleadhanna cheoil around the country, and at one in County Clare that year he met the piper Paddy Moloney; the pair spent so much time together that they were nicknamed "Ballcock and Browne", a pun on Moloney's job with a firm of builders' suppliers and a nod to aviators Alcock and Brown. Browne also took uilleann pipe lessons, alongside his friend Ivor Browne (no relation), with the piper Leo Rowsome.

In 1958, Browne and his brother Tara spent six weeks touring Ireland with a two-reel Grundig tape recorder, recording traditional musicians, singers and storytellers. On one of these trips, to Miltown Malbay, Browne met the uilleann piper Willie Clancy. Frustrated that no record company was willing to release a long-playing record of Rowsome's music, Browne and Ivor Browne, together with the poet John Montague and others, raised around £500, roughly the average annual wage of a teacher at the time, to fund an album. The future president Erskine Childers is reported to have upbraided Browne around this time for recording "squealing pipes and old women wailing songs by the hearthside", at a time when Childers felt Ireland should be presenting a modern image to the world.

== Claddagh Records and The Chieftains ==
Out of these efforts grew Claddagh Records, founded by Browne with Ivor Browne, John Montague and the genealogist Liam Mac Alasdair, among others, and named after the district close to Galway city. As Browne was not yet twenty-one, he was legally a minor and unable to become a director of the company; he had to wait until his twenty-first birthday, in 1960, for Claddagh Records to be formally incorporated. In the autumn of 1959, Claddagh released its first LP, Rowsome's Rí na bPíobairí ("The King of the Pipers"), which sold out despite industry doubts that there was a market for such recordings.

At around the same time, the composer Seán Ó Riada recruited Moloney to arrange music for a play at the Abbey Theatre, out of which grew Ó Riada's ensemble, Ceoltóirí Chualann. In 1962, Moloney, together with Sean Potts, Michael Tubridy, fiddle player Martin Fay and bodhrán player David Fallon, recorded what was intended as a one-off album for Claddagh. Initially named the Quare Fellas, after Behan's 1954 play, the group was renamed The Chieftains on Montague's suggestion, taking the name from a poetry collection he was writing at the time, Death of a Chieftain. Garech was instrumental in the formation of the group, and Claddagh went on to release the band's first six LPs, beginning with their self-titled debut in 1964.

Spoken word was also an important part of the Claddagh catalogue. The label recorded a number of Irish poets reading their own work, including Patrick Kavanagh (whose collection Almost Everything was recorded in the early 1960s), Austin Clarke, Thomas Kinsella, Montague and a young Seamus Heaney, as well as English poets Ted Hughes and Robert Graves. In 1966, Samuel Beckett oversaw the recording, in London, of the actor Jack MacGowran reading extracts from his theatre work, and, to mark the fiftieth anniversary of the Easter Rising, Claddagh released Rebel Irishwomen, featuring the voices of Helena Molony, Kathleen Behan and Maud Gonne MacBride. In 1971, shortly before Ó Riada's death, Browne persuaded him to come to Luggala to record Irish dance music and song airs on an upright harpsichord made in Dublin in 1764; the resulting album, Ó Riada's Farewell, was released posthumously.

Browne paid close attention to album artwork and sleeve notes, which he regarded as "unifying" the arts, commissioning covers from artists such as Louis le Brocquy, Patrick Scott, Edward Delaney and Barrie Cooke, and sleeve notes from writers including Benedict Kiely and Montague. While Claddagh Records had declined in importance by the late twentieth century, at the time of his death Browne was planning the re-release of several albums and had begun compiling a history of the label.

== Patron of the Arts ==
In 1964, Browne bought Woodtown Manor, a Georgian house near Rathfarnham, which he maintained alongside his rooms in Dublin. For several years it was, like Luggala, a welcoming place for Irish poets, writers and musicians, and the folk-pop group Clannad made many recordings there. Browne sold Woodtown Manor in 1997 to the property developer Seán Dunne for £1.4 million, and later sold much of its contents at auction for a further £2.3 million; among the items sold were an antique commode and a pair of fossilised deer antlers, which fetched £20,000.

Browne's younger brother Tara held his twenty-first birthday party at Luggala in 1966. Guests, who included Mick Jagger, Brian Jones, Anita Pallenberg and Paul McCartney, were flown in with some two hundred others aboard two chartered jets, and the American band the Lovin' Spoonful provided live entertainment. The antiques dealer Christopher Gibbs later recalled the guests as "this mass of androgynous youth moving towards the terminal building". Nine months later, on 17 December 1966, Tara was killed when he crashed his Lotus Elan in South Kensington, London, reportedly at a speed in excess of 100 miles an hour. Browne flew to London and later said he had gone to the mortuary and "kissed his frozen face", adding that "nothing has made up for Tara's death". For more than fifty years afterwards, he held a commemoration beside the lake at Luggala on the anniversary of his brother's death. Tara's body, like that of the infant brother and half-sister who had predeceased him, was interred at Luggala.

In 1970, Oonagh Browne stepped down as director of the Luggala Estate Company and Browne became the owner of the estate (his mother died in August 1995). He continued her tradition of hosting, in his own words, "painters, poets, pipers [and] peers", and Luggala became known for parties attended over the decades by figures including Marianne Faithfull, Behan, John Boorman, Bono, Michael Jackson and John Hurt. Seamus Heaney wrote that to enter the Luggala estate was to "cross a line into a slight otherwhere". One friend recalled being invited to Luggala for lunch and re-emerging "days later blinking into the sunlight, not sure what happened to you but knowing you had a good time". At one point, Browne invited Michael Jackson to stay at Luggala for six weeks, after the singer needed somewhere to live during a period of legal difficulty; Browne later described him as "charming" but said he "felt like I was talking to a mask and couldn't see the person inside".

In 1982, Browne attended a Rolling Stones concert at Slane Castle after his friend John Boorman turned down an invitation to accompany him. Having lost the tickets Jagger had given him, Browne persuaded the band's road crew to admit him and several friends. He subsequently collapsed at the event and was treated with oxygen by ambulance crew, after which he asked to be taken not to hospital but to a separate party to which he had been invited, arriving there by ambulance.

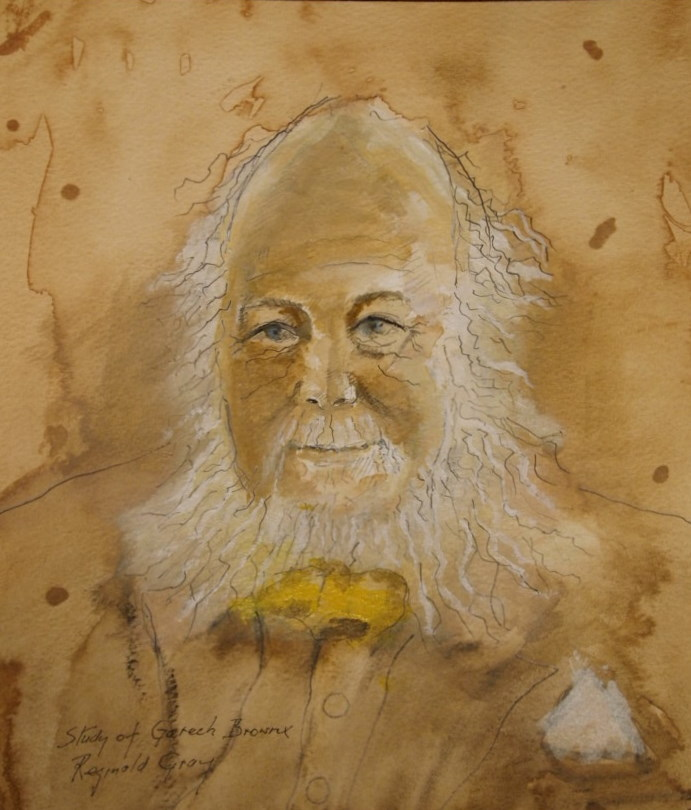
Garech Browne by Irish artist Reginald Gray.

Garech was a friend and patron of the artist Francis Bacon, and in January 2017 was featured in the BBC documentary Francis Bacon: A Brush with Violence.

== Financial difficulties and sale of Luggala ==
Although he had inherited a large amount of money, Browne's lifestyle far exceeded his income for much of his life. In the late 1960s he received an allowance of £30,000 a year (the equivalent of about €460,000 today), which his friend Grey Gowrie, 2nd Earl of Gowrie, a former Conservative Party minister, estimated fell well short of Browne's actual annual "burn rate" of around £1 million. On Gowrie's advice, Browne mortgaged several of his paintings, raising more than €5 million, though there was no long-term plan to sustain his lifestyle.

Luggala's manager, Tony Boylan, said short-term lettings and film shoots could never cover the costs of maintaining the seven-bedroom house and its 2,000-hectare (5,000-acre) estate, and that Browne resisted attempts to persuade him the house would have to be sold. When the first prospective buyer, who had travelled from Geneva, came to view the property, Browne reportedly locked himself in his bedroom and refused to come out.

Luggala was put on the market in 2017, with an asking price reported as €28 million (also given as £24.8 million). Shortly before his death, Browne said in an interview that he believed the Irish State was "almost obligated" to buy the estate and allow him to continue living there, and that he would offer it at a discount to anyone who would let him remain, though nobody took him up on the offer. According to John Boorman, Browne expressed a wish to die after being told Luggala would have to be sold. The estate was eventually sold in 2019 for around €25 million, to a buyer believed to be an Italian count.

== Honours ==
In December 2000, Trinity College Dublin awarded Browne an honorary doctorate (D.Litt.) in recognition of his work in preserving, promoting and encouraging interest in Irish traditional culture. In 2003, for his support of cross-cultural exchange between Ireland and Estonia, Browne was awarded the Cross of Terra Mariana by the Estonian government.

== Personal life ==
In December 1981, Browne married HH Princess Harshad Purna Devi Jadeja of Morvi in a Hindu ceremony in Mumbai (then Bombay) that lasted several days. Purna was the youngest child of HH Sri Mahendra Sinhji, Maharaja of Morvi (1918–57), and his wife, HH The Maharani Sri Vijay Kuverba. The couple had no children. From the time of their marriage Browne spent part of every year in Singapore and India, and in later years the couple lived largely apart, with Purna based in the East, though they remained attached to each other.

Browne was known for his eccentric personal style, including a ponytail tied with a velvet ribbon, a straggly beard, báinín jumpers, tweed trousers held up by a crios (traditional Irish belt), and, later, three-piece tweed suits and bespoke shoes made from the skins of sika deer, ostrich and elephant hide; at the time of his death he owned between three hundred and four hundred suits.

He struggled with alcoholism in later life. Grey Gowrie said alcohol had a debilitating effect on Browne's judgement, and Boylan described him as having "a lot of demons and addictions", of which alcohol was one and loneliness another, adding that Browne "was a very lonely man in the last years of his life". John Boorman said Browne "either was drinking or else trying not to drink", and that once he began he could drink for a week or ten days before collapsing. Boorman also recalled Browne as a man of "great charm" who described schools as "rehearsals for prison" and kept his watches locked in a safe, a habit Boorman took as reflecting a wish to be free of time's strictures.

Browne spoke publicly of a certain ambivalence about life. In a 2017 interview he said it was "frightful to bring anyone into this world" and that he wished he had not been born, while also observing: "I happen to be alive, so of course I celebrate it... but it doesn't stop life being basically hell". The writer John Banville, in a memoir published shortly before Browne's death, recalled him arriving at Dublin's Shelbourne Hotel "in a top hat and cape, driving a coach and pair with heedless insouciance and flair".

== Death ==
Browne died suddenly at Le Caprice restaurant in London on 10 March 2018, aged 78, while at lunch with his friend and cousin, Lord Gormanston, having returned from a visit to his wife. He was cremated in a private ceremony, and on 10 August 2018 around two hundred guests, including President Michael D. Higgins and his wife Sabina, John Boorman, Paddy Moloney, Bob Geldof, Paul McGuinness, Thomas Kinsella and the former ambassador and poet Richard Ryan, gathered on the shores of Lough Tay, where his nephews Dorian and Julien scattered his ashes.

== Estate and bequests ==
Browne left an estate worth almost €4.5 million. In his will, he left the majority of his property and effects, excluding Luggala House and its grounds, to his wife and two nephews, and bequeathed to the city of Galway the granite remains of a medieval "bow gate". The location of the gate, which had otherwise gone unmentioned by Browne, remained a mystery for over a year following his death, until it was discovered on the grounds of the Luggala estate in 2019. According to a Galway historian, the gate may have formed part of the city's defences in the seventeenth century, before being removed by Browne's direct ancestor, Lord Oranmore and Browne, and taken to the Browne family home at Castle MacGarrett; their mid-seventeenth-century ancestor Geoffrey Browne (d. 1668) may have bought the gateway from the city. The gate was one of a number of items left to the Irish State by Browne, along with his collection of sixty-nine horse-drawn carriages.

In 2022, his library of over 20,000 books and manuscripts was placed by his family on long-term loan to the OPW at Farmleigh, where it is held in the Garech Browne Room.

== Portraits ==
Portraits of Garech and photographs of Luggala were published by Vanity Fair in January 2008.

A portrait of Browne as a boy, Head of a Boy, painted at Luggala by Lucian Freud in 1956, was sold at auction in London in March 2019, reported variously as fetching €6.7 million and £5.8 million. Edward McGuire's portrait of Browne was exhibited at the Royal Hibernian Academy in 1970 and helped establish McGuire's reputation, while the Anglo-Belgian painter Anthony Palliser also painted his portrait and described Browne as a friend who "saved Irish traditional music".

Garech Browne and the Luggala estate feature in the 1991 film I Dreamt I Woke Up by John Boorman (online).

== Documentaries and later recognition ==
A German TV documentary followed a day in the life of "Mr Garech's cook" (Original: Mr Garechs Koch) made by Margit Wagner for Bayerischer Rundfunk in 1976. Filmed at Luggala, it shows Browne watching a Chieftains rehearsal, boating on the lake, and then a musical dinner party in the house. It was shown again at the Irish Film Institute in 2026.

Browne was interviewed at length for the Grace Notes traditional music programme on RTÉ lyric fm, broadcast on 18 March 2010.

A documentary on Browne's life, Garech Browne: Last Days at Luggala, directed by Mick Mahon and produced by John Boorman and Liam McGrath, was broadcast on RTÉ One on 18 December 2019. It featured interviews with Boorman, Bono, Paddy Moloney, Tony Boylan, Grey Gowrie and the biographer Robert O'Byrne, among others, and examined both Browne's cultural legacy and his struggles with alcoholism, loneliness and debt. O'Byrne, the author of the 2012 book Luggala Days: The Story of a Guinness House, said in the documentary that Browne "did the nation a service with his commitment to traditional music", noting that wealthier people than Browne had made no comparable effort for their country's culture.

In September 2023, Real to Reel: Garech Browne & Claddagh Records, a book by James Morrissey, was published, accompanied by a vinyl album of remastered Claddagh recordings. In the book, the musician Bono compared Browne's preservation work to that of the American folklorist Alan Lomax, saying Browne "saw himself as protecting our music for us", while Morrissey described his subject as "a good old-fashioned cacophony of contradictions", capable of great warmth but also chronic lateness and procrastination. Following Browne's death, a five-year licensing agreement was signed with Universal Music Ireland in 2021 to digitise and remaster more than 300 recordings from the Claddagh catalogue, and in 2023 the label signed the group ØXN, its first new act since 2005.

President Michael D. Higgins paid tribute to Browne following the book's publication, saying that "not only is our generation indebted to him, but future generations will recall his insightful, pioneering work".
