= Voice of Ages =

Studio album by The Chieftains (among others)
- Released: 21 February 2012
- Genre: Celtic, Irish and Scottish folk, Country, Americana folk, Indie-rock
- Length: 63.56
- Label: Hear Music
- Producer: Paddy Moloney, T-Bone Burnett

The Chieftains (among others) chronology
San Patricio (2010)	Voice of Ages (2012)

Voice of Ages is a 2012 album by The Chieftains, and their last album to date. It is a collaboration between the Irish band and many top musicians. On Voice of Ages, The Chieftains collaborated with well-known musicians from the worlds of indie-rock (Bon Iver, The Decemberists, The Low Anthem), country and Americana (The Civil Wars, Pistol Annies, Carolina Chocolate Drops, Punch Brothers), Irish folk (Imelda May, Lisa Hannigan) and Scottish folk (Paolo Nutini).

== Track listing ==
1. "Carolina Rua / The Ladies Pantalettes" – 3:56 (with Imelda May)
2. "Come All Ye Fair and Tender Ladies" – 4:19 (with Pistol Annies)
3. "Pretty Little Girl" – 2:48 (with Carolina Chocolate Drops)
4. "Down in the Willow Garden" – 4:16 (with Bon Iver)
5. "Lily Love" – 3:01 (with The Civil Wars)
6. "The Lark in the Clear Air / Olam Punch" – 3:20 (with Punch Brothers)
7. "My Lagan Love" – 4:27 (with Lisa Hannigan)
8. "When the Ship Comes In" – 3:26 (with The Decemberists)
9. "School Days Over" – 3:32 (with The Low Anthem)
10. "The Frost Is All Over (Roud 3051)" – 3:06 (with Punch Brothers)
11. "Peggy Gordon" – 4:10 (with The Secret Sisters)
12. "Hard Times Come Again No More" – 5:27 (with Paolo Nutini)
13. "The Chieftains Reunion" – 11:22 (with Seán Potts & Michael Tubridy)
14. "The Chieftains in Orbit" – 3:39 (with NASA Astronaut Cady Coleman)
15. "Lundu" – 3:07 (with Carlos Núñez)

== Personnel ==
The Chieftains

- Paddy Moloney - bagpipes [Uilleann], tin whistle
- Kevin Conneff - bodhrán
- Seán Keane - fiddle
- Matt Molloy - flute
