= The Year of the French (1982 serial) =

European television serial (1982)

- Based on: The Year of the French by Thomas Flanagan
- Directed by: Michael Garvey
- Theme music composer: Paddy Moloney
- Composer: Paddy Moloney
- Country of origin: Ireland/France/United Kingdom
- Original languages: English; French; Irish

Production
- Production companies: RTÉ, Channel 4, France 3

Original release
- Network: RTÉ
- Release: 18 November 1982

The Year of the French was a television serial, directed by Michael Garvey and based on the novel by Thomas Flanagan, which was first broadcast in 1982. It was a co-production by the Irish broadcaster RTÉ, the British television company Channel Four and the French broadcaster FR3, now France 3. The first episode was shown on RTÉ television on 18 November 1982. In France the programme was known as L'année des Français and was first broadcast on 23 May 1983.

The title refers to the year 1798 when French troops sailed to Ireland to support Irish rebels against the British forces under Lord Cornwallis.

To accompany the series Paddy Moloney composed and arranged music which was performed by The Chieftains with the RTÉ Concert Orchestra, conducted by Proinnsias O'Duinn, and with Ruairi Somers on bagpipes. The album of this music was released in 1983.

Historian Guy Beiner has shown that the filming of the series on location in Killala, County Mayo made an impact on local folklore and regenerated oral traditions of Bliain na bhFrancach (the Irish language term for "The Year of the French", which was commonly used to refer to memories of the French invasion and local rebellion in 1798).

Battle scenes were filmed on location in Killala in 1981, about one hundred members of the Fórsa Cosanta Áitiúil (Irish Army Reserve) transported from Castlebar Military Barracks over a period of nearly two weeks to play roles of French, English and Scottish soldiers as well as Irish peasants.

== Cast ==
- Jean-Claude Drouot: Général Humbert
- Keith Buckley: Samuel Cooper
- François Perrot: Barras
- Gilles Ségal: La Réveillière
- Niall O'Brien: Owen MacCarthy
- Donald Bisset: Lord Cornwallis
- Jeremy Clyde: Malcolm Elliott
- Nuala Holloway: Nora
- Anne-Louise Lambert: Ellen Treacy
- Jonathan Ryan: Randal McDonnell
- Robert Stephens: George Moore
- Jacques Zabor: Sarrazin
- Bryan Murray: Ferdy O'Donnell
- Gareth Forwood: Wyndham
- Mick Lally
- Marius Goring: Lord Glenthorne
- Frank Kelly: Corny O'Dowd
