= Here's a Health =

Scotland

"Here's a Health to the Company" is an Irish traditional song, based on the long history of emigration from Scotland and Ireland. Its strong tune has also been used for other Irish traditional songs and for the American anthem, "The Liberty Song".

== Origins and history ==
The song might be of Ulster origin, perhaps derived from a Scottish original. Robin Morton lists it in Folksongs Sung in Ulster, and Paddy Tunney learned the song from North Antrim singer Joe Holmes. It is markedly similar to the Aberdeenshire song known as "The Emigrant's Farewell To Donside". Hugh Shields writes: "The song is quite well known in the northern counties of Ireland, and with varying text, it has been noted in Canada and Scotland, where it was perhaps composed."

The use of the tune by the eighteenth-century American Liberty Song could reflect an association with Ulster Scots tradition, as most early Irish emigrants came from this community.

There are several known variants of the lyric, but the set of words most frequently used today was popularised by The Chieftains who recorded the song on their 1989 album A Chieftains Celebration.

== Other Recordings ==
- "Health to the Company" was recorded by the American quintet Bounding Main and released on their 2005 album Maiden Voyage.
- "Here's a Health to the Company" is a track on English folk group The Longest Johns' 2020 album Cures What Ails Ya.
