= A Chieftains Celebration =

Studio album by The Chieftains
- Released: 1989
- Recorded: May–June 1988
- Studios: Windmill Lane, Dublin, Ireland
- Genre: Irish folk music
- Length: 46:42
- Label: BMG
- Producer: Paddy Moloney

The Chieftains chronology
The Tailor of Gloucester (1988)	A Chieftains Celebration (1989)	Over the Sea To Skye: The Celtic Connection (1990)

Professional ratings
Review scores
Source	Rating
Allmusic	3.5/5 stars

A Chieftains Celebration is an album by the Irish folk music group The Chieftains. The title derives from the "celebration" of the millennium of the city of Dublin, Ireland.

"The Wexford Carol", featuring Nanci Griffith, also appeared on their 1991 album The Bells of Dublin.

== Track listing ==
1. O’ Mahoney's Frolics – 4:56
2. "Galicia" – 3:02
3. "Coolin Medley" – 4:38
4. "Here's a Health to the Company" – 3:01
5. "Planxty Brown/The William Davis's/Lady Wrixon" – 4:46
6. "Boffyflow and Spike" – 2:52
7. "The Strayaway Child" – 4:55
8. "The Iron Man" – 3:40
9. "The Wexford Carol" – 3:23
10. "Gaftaí Baile Buí" – 4:13
11. "Millennium Celtic Suite" – 7:16 – recorded live at Gaiety Theatre, Dublin in July 1988
