= Rita Keane =

Irish singer and accordionist (1922–2009)

Rita Keane (born 31 December 1922, Caherlistrane, near Tuam, County Galway, Ireland – died 28 June 2009, Galway City) was an Irish traditional singer and accordionist. She was a member of a well known Irish musical family, and had a lifelong musical partnership with her older sister, Sarah. She was a paternal aunt of singers Dolores, Seán and Matt Keane.

== Early life ==
Keane grew up with six siblings in a home where music was always present. The whole Keane family sang and played instruments, and frequently played host to other singers and musicians from East Galway and beyond. Keane's mother, May, was an assiduous collector of traditional songs and tunes, and passed on her passion to her children. When, in later years, Dolores, Seán and Matt Keane started recording professionally, they were able to draw on a wealth of material from their paternal aunts.

In 1939, Keane and her sister Sarah were given accordions, which they would play at celebrations and funerals in the local area. In 1958, the sisters entertained guests at the wedding of local farmer John Corbett to Mary Murphy, who had recently returned to Ireland after spending five years living in New York.

== Musical career ==
In the 1950s and 1960s Rita and Sarah played as part of Keane's Céilí Band, who performed for audiences of up to 1,000 people at dances in the local town of Tuam. At one stage, Brendan Burke, father of John "Turps" Burke who later became a member of the Saw Doctors, played with the band.

In the late 1960s the broadcaster Ciarán Mac Mathúna made recordings of the Keane sisters, which he broadcast on a series of radio programmes for RTÉ. These proved popular with listeners, and resulted in the recording of an album entitled Once I Loved in 1969. Their only other album, At the Setting of the Sun, would not follow until 1985. Both albums feature a mixture of sean-nós (traditional unaccompanied Irish language singing) and ballads sung in English, and have subsequently been re-released on CD, indicating a continued interest in, and demand for, the Keane sisters' recorded work.

== Later life and death ==
Keane's passion for music remained with her up until her death. Seán Keane recalls the Keane sisters saying, of music, 'Oh God, it keeps us alive!'. Keane reportedly played her accordion until a few days before her death on 28 June 2009, aged 86.

== Personal life ==
Keane did not marry, and lived her whole life in the house of her birth at Caherlistrane with her sister Sarah, who survived her.

== Discography ==
Once I Loved (1969, Claddagh Records)
At the Setting of the Sun (1985, Gael-Linn Records)

== Recognition and awards ==
The cultural significance of the Keane family has been recognised both within Ireland and internationally, with their work having been highlighted by broadcast media from as far away as Japan.

In 2006, Rita and Sarah Keane were awarded the Lifetime Achievement Award by Irish language television channel TG4 for their contribution to traditional music.
