= Finn Ó Haughluinn =

Irish musician who died in 1490

Finn Ó Haughluinn, Irish musician, died 1490.

Ó Haughluinn is described in his obituary in the Annals of the Four Masters as Chief Tympanist of Ireland. No further details of his life are given or are known to survive.

His obit was one of the last of any musician in the Gaelic annals, and apparently the very last reference in classical Irish literature to the An Tiompan Gàidhealach, which was being steadily replaced by the harp.
