= Siobhán O'Brien =

Irish singer-songwriter (born 1969)

Siobhán O'Brien (born 24 August 1969 in Limerick, Ireland) is a singer-songwriter who performs with acoustic guitar and harmonica. O'Brien has performed with Bob Dylan, The San Diego Symphony, The Chieftains and supported such acts as Christy Moore, Donovan, Damien Dempsey, Pete Cummings, Sharon Shannon, Henry McCullough, Maria McKee, Mick Flannery, Paul Brady and the Cranberries. Her solo work incorporates traditions of American song, including folk, blues, country, rock and English, Scottish and Irish traditional music.

== Biography ==
O'Brien is the niece of Brendan Bowyer of The Royal Showband and the great-great-granddaughter of Albert Bowyer of the Bowyer/Westwood Opera Company of Blackpool, England. She made her first musical recording of a sea shanty at the age of six. In 2008, she toured the United States with performances in New York City, Boston, Nashville and California. On this tour, she performed in concert as a guest vocalist on "Lakes of Ponchartrain" with The Chieftains at Boston Symphony Hall, Massachusetts. In 2008, she released her third album Songs I Grew Up To which features Paddy Moloney (The Chieftains) on "Long Black Veil" and "Lakes of Ponchartrain:. In 2010, she performed in concert as a guest vocalist performing with The San Diego Symphony in California.

== Discography ==
- Cat's Eyes
