= Leo Rowsome =

Irish piper (1903–1970)

- Born: Martin Leo Rowsome; 5 April 1903; Harold's Cross, County Dublin, Ireland
- Died: 20 September 1970 (aged 67); Riverstown, County Sligo, Ireland
- Occupation: Musician

Martin Leo Rowsome (5 April 1903 – 20 September 1970) was the third generation of an unbroken line of uilleann pipers. He was a performer, manufacturer and teacher of the uilleann pipes throughout his life.

Samuel Rowsome, Leo’s grandfather sent his sons, John, Thomas and William, to a German teacher who lived in Ferns, near their home in County Wexford to learn the theory of music and how to play various instruments. This knowledge was passed on through William to his son, Leo, who made good use of it in his teaching, writing music for his many pupils.

Leo, the third son among seven sons and one daughter of William Rowsome, a carpenter (died 1925), and (Bridget) Ann Rowsome (née Murphy), was born in Harold's Cross, Dublin in 1903. His father, William, a Protestant who converted to his wife's Catholic religion, realised that his son had the ability to become a talented musician and craftsman. Constantly watching his father making and repairing instruments, Leo learned the art of pipe making and instrument repair. So rapid was his progress at piping that in 1919 at the age of sixteen he was appointed teacher of the uilleann pipes at Dublin’s Municipal School of Music (now Dublin Institute of Technology Conservatory of Music and Drama) for 50 years. In 1925, Leo’s father died at the age of fifty-five. Leo successfully carried on the family business, after completing his own set of pipes in 1926. He also taught at Dublin’s Pipers Club of which he was president, having revived it as Cumann na Píobairí in 1936 after an 11-year hiatus.

Leo was the first uilleann piper to perform on Irish National Radio in the early 1920s when he played solo and later in duets with Frank O'Higgins (fiddle), Micheal O Duinn (fiddle) and Leo’s brother John (fiddle). Leo’s "All Ireland Trio" comprised Neilus Cronin, (flute), Seamus O'Mahony (fiddle) and Leo on pipes. He formed his Pipes Quartet in the mid-1930s and broadcast regularly throughout the 1940s and 1950s. Leo was the first Irish artist to perform on BBC TV (1933). He made many recordings for Decca, Columbia and His Master's Voice. His last commercial recording, CC1 “Ri na bPiobairi” (King of the Pipers) was made for Claddagh Records in 1959.

In 1934 Leo married Helena Williams, from Taghmon, County Wexford. They had two sons, Leon Rowsome (1936–1994) and Liam Rowsome (1939–1997), and twin daughters, Helena and Olivia. All four showed musical talent on a variety of instruments. Leo's eldest son Leon carried on the tradition of uilleann pipe making in the Rowsome family, toured internationally as a solo piper, and recorded two solo albums on the uilleann pipes. Leon and his wife. Noreen (O'Flaherty) Rowsome, from Corca Dhuibhne, had five children (Kevin, Mary, Anne, Nuala, and Caitríona) and ten grandchildren (Leo's great-grandchildren), five of whom (Tierna, Naoise, Mark Óg, Luke, and Alastair) are sixth-generation uilleann pipers. Leon's son, Kevin, is an accomplished and world-renowned fifth-generation uilleann piper.

== Death and legacy ==
Leo Rowsome died suddenly whilst adjudicating The Fiddler of Dooney Competition in Riverstown, County Sligo on 20 September 1970. To commemorate the centenary of Leo Rowsome's birth in 2003, his daughter, Helena had some of Leo’s original manuscripts published by Waltons; "The Leo Rowsome Collection of Irish Music" consists of 428 reels, jigs, airs, and hornpipes.

== Discography ==
- Rí na bPíobairí (King of the Pipers) (1959)
- The Drones and the Chanters (1971)
- Classics of Irish Piping (1975)
