= Ceoltóirí Chualann =

Irish traditional band active 1960-1969

- Origin: Dublin, Ireland
- Genres: Irish Traditional
- Years active: 1960–1969
- Spinoff of: The Chieftains
- Past members: Seán Ó Riada; Paddy Moloney; Sean Potts; Sonny Brogan; John Kelly; Peadar Mercier; Seán Keane; Ronnie McShane

Ceoltóirí Chualann (pronounced [ˈcoːl̪ˠt̪ˠoːɾʲiː ˈxuəlˠən̪ˠ]) was an Irish traditional band, led by Seán Ó Riada, which included many of the founding members of The Chieftains. Ceoltóirí is the Irish word for musicians, and Cualann is the name of an area just outside Dublin where Ó Riada lived. Ó Riada's work with Ceoltóirí Chualann is credited with revitalizing the use of the bodhrán as a percussion instrument in Celtic music.

In 1960 Ó Riada was looking for musicians to perform music for the play "The Song of the Anvil" by Bryan MacMahon. Paddy Moloney, at the age of 20, was called to participate in the project, along with his friend Sean Potts on tin whistle, Sonny Brogan on accordion and John Kelly on fiddle.

They rehearsed weekly in Ó Riada's house in Galloping Green, on the outskirts of Dublin.

Following its success, Ó Riada had the idea of forming Ceoltóirí Chualann, a band to play traditional Irish songs with accompaniment and traditional dance tunes and slow airs, arranged with instruments: harpsichord, bodhran, piano, fiddle, accordions, flute, pipes and whistles. The idea of actually arranging folk music, or dance music, had been done on at least one or two 78 rpm recordings in the past, but they were folk tunes done in a classical way, highly orchestrated. Another aim was to revitalize the work of blind harpist and composer Turlough O'Carolan.

The band was launched during the Dublin Theatre Festival in September 1960, at the Shelbourne Hotel, at an event called Reacaireacht an Riadaigh (Ó Riada's Recital). Included in the program were traditional singers, writer Seán Ó Ríordáin and poet Seán Ó Tuama. In March of the following year Ó Riada recorded the first of a series of radio programmes for which he retained the name Reacaireacht an Riadaigh, and included music played by Ceoltóirí Chualann. Soon after the band's formation, Peadar Mercier and Seán Keane joined.

Ceoltóirí Chualann continued to play until 1969. Their music was featured in the 1968 documentary, The Village, by Mark McCarty (director) and Paul Hockings (anthropologist). During 1969 they recorded two albums, Ó Riada and Ó Riada Sa Gaiety. The latter of those two albums was not released until after 1971, when Seán Ó Riada died.

== Select discography ==
- An Poc ar Buile EP: Seán Ó Riada with Seán Ó Sé and Ceoltóirí Chualann GL2 (196?).
- Néilí EP: Seán Ó Riada with Seán Ó Sé and Ceoltóirí Chualann GL3 (196?).
- Mo Chailín Bán EP: Seán Ó Riada with Seán Ó Sé and Ceoltóirí Chualann GL5 (196?).
- Reacaireacht an Riadaigh: Gael-Linn CEF 010 (LP, 1961).
- The Playboy of the Western World: Gael-Linn CEF 012 (LP, 1962).
- Ceol na nUasal: Gael-Linn CEF 015 (LP, 1967).
- Ding Dong: Gael-Linn CEF 016 (LP, 1967).
- An Poc ar Buile (single): Seán Ó Riada with Seán Ó Sé and Ceoltóirí Chualann CES 011
- Do Bhí Bean Uasal: Seán Ó Riada with Seán Ó Sé and Ceoltóirí Chualann CES 012
- Ó Riada sa Gaiety with Seán Ó Sé and Ceoltóirí Chualann: (LP, 1971) currently available as Gael-Linn ORIADACD01.
- Ó Riada's Farewell: Claddagh Records CC 12 (LP, 1972).
- Port na bPúcaí (Ó Riada solo, but with trad. material, previously unreleased recordings): Gael-Linn ORIADACD07 (CD, 2014)
