= Lawrence Cohn =

American music executive (1932–2023)

- Born: October 4, 1932; Lebanon, Pennsylvania, U.S.
- Died: October 31, 2023 (aged 91)
- Other names: Lawyer, record company executive, record collector

Lawrence Cohn (October 4, 1932 – October 31, 2023) was an American lawyer, record company executive, and blues collector. He is best known as one of the creators of Legacy Recordings, a branch of Sony Music Entertainment and as the originator and producer of the Roots 'N' Blues series.

== Life and career ==
Lawrence Cohn was born in Lebanon, Pennsylvania, and as a child moved with his family to Bensonhurst in Brooklyn. He started listening to, and collecting, blues records as a child, continuing through his teens when he also started attending jazz and blues performances in New York City. After leaving school he attended City College of New York, but left during his studies to serve in the U.S. Army in the Korean War. When the war ended he toured widely as a member of the Army basketball team, before returning to complete college and enroll at Brooklyn Law School. He then became a federal agent, later working with Attorney General Bobby Kennedy.

Outside his paid employment, he started writing reviews on blues, folk, country and gospel music for the Saturday Review, and wrote liner notes on record releases for a wide range of blues musicians. He also amassed one of the largest collections of blues recordings. After leaving federal employment in 1968, he joined Columbia Records, and was then appointed Vice-President of Epic Records. One of his responsibilities at CBS was to co-supervise the Country Music Division. He later became head of Playboy Records and Music, and was also COO and minor partner in the short-lived CBS Records-Bob Dylan generated label, "Accomplice Records" (1980-82]). He continued his career as a producer, writer and critic. He wrote Movietone Presents the Twentieth Century (New York : St. Martin's Press, 1976) and edited Nothing But The Blues : The Music and the Musicians (New York : Abbeville Press, 1993). He also spent 8 years as a Music Critic for the Saturday Review, at the same time serving as a Federal Agent, much of the time working on Attorney General Robert Kennedy's "Organized Crime Drive" program.

Cohn had eight Grammy Award nominations and won Grammy Award for Best Historical Album in 1991 for the "Robert Johnson : The Complete Recordings" project. In the same year he also received the W. C. Handy Award for his work on Robert Johnson and was honored with a Special Distinction Award by the Blues Foundation for his "Contribution to the Blues." Moreover, Sony Music provided him with their first President's Award, for his work on Robert Johnson. He was also selected as one of the "100 Most Important People In The Music Business." [BAM, 1991]

During his tenure at both CBS and Playboy, he was responsible in various ways for the Discovery/Signing/Producing/Career Decisions of many artists including but not limited to: Billy Joel (as "Attila"), Willie Nelson, REO Speedwagon, Cheap Trick (as "Fuse"), Edgar Winter's White Trash, Johnny Winter, Fleetwood Mac (Peter Green's earlier line-up), Shuggie Otis, Johnny Otis, Don "Sugarcane" Harris, Ivory Joe Hunter, ABBA (as "Bjorn & Benny"), Jo Ann Kelly, Brenda Patterson, Sam Phillips (productions), Wayne Cochran & the CC Riders, Lead Belly (first live concert), Otis Blackwell, Gene Austin, Rufus (pre-Chaka Khan), Max Weinberg ("Blackstone"), Poco, Tammy Wynette, Charlie Rich, Jim & Jesse, Bob Luman, David Houston, Jim Messina, Terry Reid, Mashmakhan, Gary Busey ("Carp"), Redbone, CHASE, Santana, Neil Diamond, Taj Mahal, The Clancy Brothers with Tommy Makem, Gene Autry, Pete Seeger, Bill Monroe.

Cohn spent several years in Paris, France as the head of a Magazine & Book Publishing Company. He was a "three category" Blues Foundation winner [Hall of Fame; Vintage Historical Reissue; Career: Historical Preservation] as well as being a vernacular music collector of note and a founding member of the near-legendary "Blues Mafia," a group considered by many as a major force regarding the interest in traditional American music.

His book, "Nothing But The Blues: The Music and the Musicians," received numerous awards. Amongst them, the ASCAP-Deems Taylor Award, BMI-Ralph Gleason Award and the Blues Foundations's "Hall of Fame" designation. He received numerous awards and citations for his work, including France's "Academie Charles Gross: Grand Prix Du Disque." [1992] He was the recipient of the President's Life Achievement Award, given by his undergraduate alma mater, City College of New York [CUNY]. [2016]; "Living Blues Magazine Awards." [1] Producer of the Year [2] Best Historical Project: Pre-War. [2018].

Cohn died on October 31, 2023, at the age of 91.

== Sources ==
Lawrence Cohn, ed. (1993). Nothing But the Blues: The Music and the Musicians. Abbeville Publishing Group (Abbeville Press, Inc.). ISBN 1-55859-271-7.
