= The Chieftains =

Irish folk band (1962–2023)

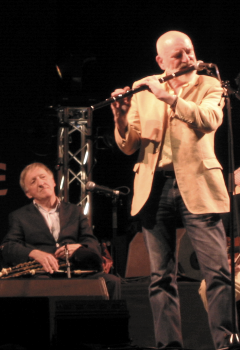
- The Chieftains performing in 2008

Background information
- Also known as: Ireland's Musical Ambassadors
- Origin: Dublin, Ireland
- Genres: Irish rock; folk rock; Celtic rock
- Years active: 1962–2021, 2023
- Labels: Claddagh; Island; RCA; Columbia
- Past members: Paddy Moloney; Seán Potts; Michael Tubridy; David Fallon; Martin Fay; Peadar Mercier; Seán Keane; Derek Bell; Ronnie McShane; Barney McKenna; Matt Molloy; Kevin Conneff
- Website: thechieftains.com

The Chieftains were an Irish folk rock band formed in Dublin, Ireland, in 1962, by Paddy Moloney, Seán Potts and Michael Tubridy. Their sound, which is almost entirely instrumental and largely built around uilleann pipes, has become synonymous with traditional Irish music. They are regarded as having helped popularise Irish music around the world. They have won six Grammy Awards during their career and they were given a Lifetime Achievement Award at the 2002 BBC Radio 2 Folk Awards. Some music experts have credited The Chieftains with bringing traditional Irish music to a worldwide audience, so much so that the Irish government awarded them the honorary title of "Ireland's Musical Ambassadors" in 1989.

== Name ==
The band's name came from the book Death of a Chieftain by Irish author John Montague. Assisted early on by Garech Browne, they signed with his company Claddagh Records.

== Career ==
=== Origins ===
Paddy Moloney was a member of Ceoltóirí Chualann, a group of musicians who specialised in instrumentals and sought to form a new band. Their first rehearsals were held at Moloney's house, with David Fallon and Martin Fay joining the original three. The group remained only semi-professional until the 1970s. By then, they had achieved great success in Ireland and the United Kingdom.

=== Rise to international fame ===
In 1973, their popularity began to spread to the United States when their previous albums were released there by Island Records. They received further acclaim when they worked on the Academy Award–winning soundtrack to Stanley Kubrick's 1975 film Barry Lyndon, which triggered their transition to the mainstream in the US.

=== Successful career ===
The group continued to release successful records throughout the 1970s and 1980s, and their work with Van Morrison in 1988 resulted in the critically acclaimed album Irish Heartbeat. They went on to collaborate with many other well-known musicians and singers; among them Luciano Pavarotti, the Rolling Stones, Madonna, Sinéad O'Connor, Sting, and Roger Daltrey.

=== 50th anniversary ===
In 2012, they celebrated their 50th anniversary with an ambitious album and tour. The album, Voice of Ages, was produced by T Bone Burnett and featured the Chieftains collaborating with many musicians including Bon Iver, Paolo Nutini and The Decemberists. It also included a collaboration with NASA astronaut Catherine Coleman playing the flute aboard the International Space Station as it orbited the Earth. The Chieftains performed at Carnegie Hall on 17 March 2012.

=== The Irish Goodbye Tour ===
In February 2019, The Chieftains embarked on an extensive farewell tour entitled the "Irish Goodbye Tour", including a 2019 European leg, a 2020 Canadian leg and two 2019 and 2020 US legs.

On 13 March 2020, the band announced that a few tour dates of their "Irish Goodbye Tour" had been postponed (until further notice) due to the COVID-19 pandemic. (Note: Five shows scheduled for mid-March 2020 in the US had to be postponed due to the coronavirus situation in the US: on 13 March at Symphony Hall in Boston, Massachusetts; on 14 at the UConn Jorgensen Center in Storrs, Connecticut; on 15 at the New Jersey Performing Arts Center in Newark, New Jersey; on 17 at The Town Hall in New York City; on 19 at the George Mason University in Fairfax, Virginia. All tickets will be honoured for the soon-to-be-rescheduled dates.)

=== 2021: Paddy Moloney's death ===
The Chieftains' co-founder and leader Paddy Moloney died suddenly on 12 October 2021, effectively ending the band.

=== 2022: Live in San Francisco 1973 & 1976 ===
On 23 July 2022, in celebration of the band's 60 years, it was announced the forthcoming release on 2 September 2022 on vinyl, CD, and digital download of Bear's Sonic Journals: The Foxhunt, The Chieftains Live in San Francisco 1973 & 1976 featuring the Chieftains performing live in San Francisco in 1973 and 1976. The 2-CD and digital editions of the album feature the recordings of two entire shows in San Francisco: on 1 October 1973 at The Boarding House during their first tour in the U.S. (an unscheduled gig which occurred at Jerry Garcia's invitation to open for his bluegrass band, Old & In the Way) and on 5 May 1976 at The Great American Music Hall, while the vinyl release features two sides containing (only) the performance from 1 October 1973.

== Collaborations ==
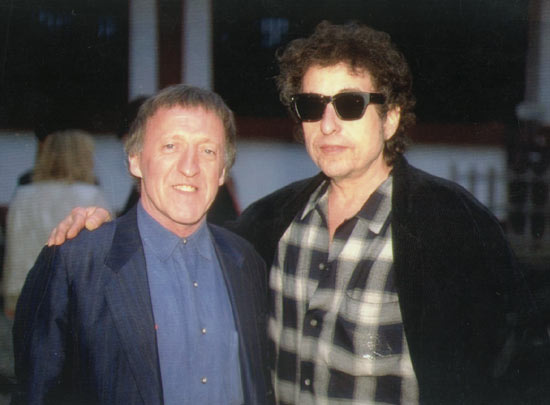
Paddy Moloney pictured with Bob Dylan, who is a fan of the band's work

The band has become known for their vast work of collaborations with popular musicians of many genres, including country music, Galician traditional music, Newfoundland music, and rock and roll. Their widespread work as collaborators resulted in the Irish government awarding the group the honorary title of Ireland's Musical Ambassadors in 1989.

They have performed with (in alphabetical order):

- Moya Brennan
- Jackson Browne
- The Belfast Harp Orchestra
- Rosanne Cash
- The Civil Wars
- Ry Cooder
- The Corrs
- Elvis Costello
- Roger Daltrey
- The Decemberists
- Lila Downs
- The Dubliners
- Elio e le Storie Tese
- John Entwistle
- Marianne Faithfull
- Bela Fleck
- James Galway
- Art Garfunkel
- Glass Tiger
- Mike Gordon
- Great Big Sea
- Nanci Griffith
- Emmylou Harris
- Irish Ballet Company
- Mick Jagger
- Colin James
- Tom Jones
- Shoukichi Kina
- Sissel Kyrkjebø
- Kepa Junkera
- Mark Knopfler
- Diana Krall
- Alison Krauss
- Nolwenn Leroy
- Los Cenzontles
- Lyle Lovett
- The Low Anthem
- Ashley MacIsaac
- Natalie MacMaster
- Madonna
- Ziggy Marley
- Loreena McKennitt
- Sarah McLachlan
- Natalie Merchant
- Milladoiro
- Gary Moore
- Van Morrison
- Willie Nelson
- Nickel Creek
- Carlos Núñez
- Paolo Nutini
- Siobhán O'Brien
- Sinéad O'Connor
- Mike Oldfield
- Luciano Pavarotti
- Pink Martini
- The Pogues
- Punch Brothers
- Eros Ramazzotti
- The Rolling Stones
- Earl Scruggs
- Ricky Skaggs
- Sting
- Ultravox
- Jim White
- John Williams

In May 1986, they performed at Self Aid, a benefit concert held in Dublin that focused on the problem of chronic unemployment which was widespread in Ireland at that time. In 1994, they appeared in Roger Daltrey's production, album and video of A Celebration: The Music of Pete Townshend and The Who. They performed with Canadian astronaut Cmdr. Chris Hadfield in Houston, Texas, on 15 February 2013. Hadfield sang and played guitar on "Moondance" from aboard the International Space Station.

== Success and legacy ==
The band has won six Grammy Awards and has been nominated eighteen times. They have won an Emmy and a Genie and contributed tracks, including their highly praised version of the song Women of Ireland, to Leonard Rosenman's Oscar-winning score for Stanley Kubrick's 1975 film Barry Lyndon. In 2002 they were given a Lifetime Achievement Award by the UK's BBC Radio 2. Two of their singles have been minor hits in the UK Singles Chart. "Have I Told You Lately" (credited to The Chieftains with Van Morrison) reached No. 71 in 1995. "I Know My Love" (credited to The Chieftains featuring The Corrs) reached No. 37 in 1999.

Dr Gearóid Ó hAllmhuráin said the success of The Chieftains helped place Irish traditional music on a par with other musical genres in the world of popular entertainment. By collaborating with pop and rock musicians, they have taken Irish music to a much wider audience. They have become, in effect, musical ambassadors for Ireland. This de facto role was officially recognised by the Irish government in 1989 when it awarded the group the honorary title of Ireland's Musical Ambassadors.

== Notable performances ==
They played in a concert for Pope John Paul II, before an audience of more than one million people in 1979 in Phoenix Park in Dublin, to mark the Papal visit to Ireland.

In 1983, they were invited by the Chinese government to perform with the Chinese Broadcasting Art Group in a concert on the Great Wall of China, becoming the first Western musical group to do so. They were the first group to perform in the Capitol Building in Washington, D.C., invited by Senator Edward Kennedy and the former Speaker of the House, Tip O'Neill.

In 2011, they performed at a concert in Dublin attended by President Mary McAleese and Queen Elizabeth II of Britain during her first official trip to Ireland.

On 14 April 2023, the band reunited for one last time to play for president Joe Biden, who was visiting his ancestral home of Ballina, County Mayo, in a historical tour of the island. Biden has also numerous times stated that The Chieftains are his favorite band.

== Personnel ==
Former members

- Paddy Moloney – uilleann pipes, tin whistle, button accordion, bodhrán (1962–2021; died 2021)
- Seán Potts – tin whistle, bones, bodhrán (1962–1979; died 2014)
- Michael Tubridy – flute, concertina, tin whistle (1962–1979)
- David Fallon – bodhrán (1962–1966)
- Martin Fay – fiddle, bones (1962–2002; died 2012)
- Peadar Mercier – bodhrán, bones (1966–1976; died 1991)
- Seán Keane – fiddle, tin whistle (1968–2013; occasional performances thereafter; died 2023)
- Derek Bell – Irish harp, keyboard instruments, oboe (1975–2002; died 2002)
- Ronnie McShane – bones, bodhrán (1975–1976; died 2017)
- Kevin Conneff – bodhrán, vocals (1976–2023)
- Matt Molloy – flute, tin whistle (1979–2023)

Touring musicians

- Tim Edey – guitars, melodeon/button accordion, piano, backing vocals
- Seamie O'Dowd – guitars, accordion (replacing Tim Edey when he is not touring?)
- Triona Marshall – keyboards, harp
- Tara Breen – fiddle, saxophone, step dancing
- Alyth McCormack – vocals, step dancing
- Jon Pilatzke – fiddle, step dancing
- Nathan Pilatzke – step dancing
- Cara Butler – step dancing

== Discography ==
1. The Chieftains (1964)
2. The Chieftains 2 (1969)
3. The Chieftains 3 (1971)
4. The Chieftains 4 (1973)
5. The Chieftains 5 (1975)
6. The Chieftains 6: Bonaparte's Retreat (1976)
7. The Chieftains 7 (1977)
8. The Chieftains Live! (1977, live)
9. The Chieftains 8 (1978)
10. The Chieftains 9: Boil the Breakfast Early (1979)
11. The Chieftains 10: Cotton-Eyed Joe (1980)
12. The Grey Fox (1982) (soundtrack to The Grey Fox)
13. The Year of the French (1983, with the RTÉ Concert Orchestra)
14. The Chieftains in China (1985)
15. Ballad of the Irish Horse (1986)
16. Celtic Wedding (1987)
17. In Ireland (1987) (with James Galway)
18. Irish Heartbeat (1988) (with Van Morrison)
19. The Tailor of Gloucester (1988) (with Meryl Streep)
20. A Chieftains Celebration (1989)
21. Over the Sea To Skye: The Celtic Connection (1990) (with James Galway)
22. The Bells of Dublin (1991)
23. Reel Music: The Filmscores (1991)
24. Another Country (1992)
25. An Irish Evening (1992, live)
26. The Best of the Chieftains (1992, compilation)
27. Far and Away original motion picture soundtrack (with John Williams) (1992)
28. The Celtic Harp: A Tribute to Edward Bunting (1993) (with The Belfast Harp Orchestra)
29. The Long Black Veil (1995)
30. Film Cuts (1996)
31. Santiago (1996)
32. Long Journey Home (1998, with the Irish Film Orchestra and Elvis Costello)
33. Fire in the Kitchen (1998, compilation)
34. Silent Night: A Christmas in Rome (1998, live)
35. Tears of Stone (1999)
36. Water from the Well (2000)
37. The Wide World Over (2002, compilation)
38. Down the Old Plank Road: The Nashville Sessions (2002)
39. Further Down the Old Plank Road (2003)
40. Live from Dublin: A Tribute to Derek Bell (2005, live)
41. The Essential Chieftains (2006, compilation)
42. San Patricio (2010) (with Ry Cooder)
43. Voice of Ages (2012)
44. Chronicles: 60 Years of The Chieftains (2021, compilation)
45. A Celtic Landscape (2021, compilation)
46. Bear’s Sonic Journals: The Foxhunt, The Chieftains Live in San Francisco 1973 & 1976 (2022)

== See also ==
- List of Irish Grammy Award winners and nominees

== General sources ==
- Glatt, John (1997). The Chieftains: The Authorized Biography. New York: Da Capo. ISBN 978-0-306-80922-4. OCLC 1148213653.
