= Ivor Browne =

Irish psychiatrist (1929–2024)

- Born: William Ivory Browne; 18 March 1929; Dublin, Ireland
- Died: 24 January 2024 (aged 94); Dublin, Ireland
- Occupation: Psychiatrist

William Ivory "Ivor" Browne (18 March 1929 – 24 January 2024) was an Irish psychiatrist and author who was Chief Psychiatrist of the Eastern Health Board, and professor emeritus of psychiatry at University College Dublin. He was best known for his theory of trauma as being at the root cause of many psychiatric diagnoses, as well as his early therapeutic use of psychedelics. He was also known for his opposition to traditional psychiatry, and his scepticism about psychiatric drugs. Browne died on 24 January 2024, at the age of 94.

== Early life and education ==
Ivor Browne was born on 18 March 1929, to a middle-class family from Sandycove, Dublin. He said that he was an often miserable child who was prone to daydreaming. He attended secondary school at Blackrock College, where he discovered jazz music, and began playing the trumpet. After Blackrock College, he went to a secretarial school, and gained admission to the Royal College of Surgeons. He said that his intention was to become a jazz musician and that he only took up medicine to please his parents. During his time in the College of Surgeons, he had several bouts of tuberculosis, which diverted him from being a musician.

== Career ==
In 1955, he became a qualified doctor. According to Browne, his professor of medicine in the Richmond Hospital told him that: "You're only fit to be an obstetrician or a psychiatrist." He had little interest in general medicine, and decided to become a psychiatrist. He started his internship in a neurosurgical unit, where he assisted a surgeon. He said of his work there:

Nearly every Saturday morning one or two patients would be sent down from Grangegorman to have their brains 'chopped'... this was the major lobotomy procedure... where burr holes were drilled on each side of the temples and a blunt instrument inserted to sever the frontal lobes almost completely from the rest of the brain.

Browne went on to work in the United Kingdom and in the United States. He was awarded a scholarship to study public and community mental health at Harvard University. After returning to Ireland, he became the fifth Medical Superintendent of Grangegorman Mental Hospital (St. Brendan's) in 1966 and he was made Professor of psychiatry at University College Dublin and Chief Psychiatrist of the Eastern Health Board. He retired from St Brendan's Hospital in the mid-1990s.

== Work on trauma ==
In his book Ivor Browne, the Psychiatrist: Music and Madness, he speaks of the concept of trauma stored in the body as 'the frozen present', unprocessed emotions, a concept he had originally published decades before. At the time, his work received very little attention from the psychiatric profession, however his work paved the way for the later work of Dr Gabor Mate and Dr Bessel Van der Kolk on trauma.

Browne's idea of trauma of "the frozen present" becomes a key part to understanding how he looks at psychiatric and psychotherapeutic work. In an article published in Network Ireland magazine, Browne explains his attitude to trauma.

Once that shut down (through a traumatic experience) happens, then that experience is frozen. So it is not a case of a threatening memory being repressed, it is that it has never gotten in properly. Once it is frozen it is outside of time, so twenty years later this can be activate – some everyday event can trigger it – and you then experience it as if it is happening now. You don’t think about it and remember it – you feel it and experience it. And of course at that point you think you are going nuts because you look around and nothing traumatic is happening, yet you experience this traumatic feeling. That is why I called it "the frozen present", because when it comes, it comes through as the present, not as the past. Eventually when it works its way through and you experience it a few times then it moves into the past.

"The best example is grief" Ivor says, "if you have lost someone you have to do a lot of work over time in order to integrate that to allow it to become a memory. Then it becomes less threatening. When my wife died five years ago, the first year was absolute hell, and I couldn’t imagine feeling any joy. The second year was bad, but not quite as bad as the first. Now after five years I am quite contented. I have a different life.' By processing the trauma, it has shifted into memory, but this approach is not possible in the current psychiatric model."

His work on trauma influenced, and was influenced by, the work of Dr Stan Grof. In 1985, Browne published an article in the Irish Journal of Psychiatry, entitled "Psychological Trauma, or Unexperienced Experience" which at the time receive no citations. Stan Grof believed in the importance of Browne's work, and republished the article in Revision magazine in 1990.

=== Attitude to drugs ===
Browne experimented with LSD as a means to encourage regression experiences both in his personal life and professionally. He has campaigned against what he sees as an overuse of medications in modern psychiatry. He said:

When someone is depressed, [doctors] assume that this is caused by a disturbance in your biochemistry, which must be related to some sort of genetic thing in your personality. What I would want to know is what has happened in that person's past and their present that is disturbing their biochemistry and making them depressed? Our behaviour has an immediate and far-reaching effect on our chemical balance, but that question's not asked. Even as you and I are sitting here discussing this, there are all sorts of changes happening in your neurochemistry and in your body – so it's highly dynamic.

He has used psychiatric medications with his patients, but he said that he used a fraction of the drugs prescribed by modern psychiatrists.

=== Community work ===
Browne set up the Irish Foundation for Human Development, and started the first community association in Ireland in Ballyfermot, which worked to try to turn it into a thriving community.

== Bibliography ==
- Ivor Browne, Music and Madness (Cork, Cork University Press, 2010).
