= Claddagh Records =

Irish record label

- Founded: 1959
- Founder: Garech Browne, Ivor Browne
- Official website: Official site

Claddagh Records is a record label, based in Dublin's Temple Bar area, founded in 1959 by Garech Browne and Ivor Browne. It specialises in Irish traditional music, song and spoken word.

Garech Browne had been taking uilleann pipe lessons at the time from maestro Leo Rowsome, whom had made many of the earliest Irish music recordings in the 1920s and 1930s through His Master's Voice and Decca; Rowsome went on to be the debut artist featured by the Claddagh label with his album "Rí na bPíobairí" ("King of the Pipers"; also the name of a traditional tune), producing virtuosic recordings. The second release by Claddagh was The Chieftains' debut album, a band who has made history as, arguably, the most globally well-known and longest-running Irish traditional group.

Some Claddagh records feature poets reading their own works, amongst whom include Patrick Kavanagh, John Montague, and a young Seamus Heaney. Liam O’Flaherty's 1981 record was to be the only one of him reading his own work recorded by Claddagh.

Garech Browne, who died in 2018, was an Irish art collector and a notable patron of the Irish arts, traditional Irish music in particular. He was often known by his Irish name, Garech de Brún, or Garech a Brún, particularly in Ireland and by Irish speakers.

Ivor Browne, who died on 24 January 2024, was a jazz and traditional musician, as well as a retired psychiatrist and author. In addition to serving as former Chief Psychiatrist of the Eastern Health Board, Browne was also Professor Emeritus of Psychiatry at University College Dublin. During his psychiatric career, he was well-known for his staunch opposition to traditional psychiatric treatment methods, particularly with regard to his skepticism surrounding psychiatric drugs; Browne openly discussed his early experiences with psychedelics, like LSD, in a quest for non-traditional, experimental "treatments" of his own mental conditions (such as depression).

== Notable Claddagh Records artists ==
- Leo Rowsome
- The Chieftains
- Ronan Browne
- Peadar O'Loughlin
- Denis Murphy
- Julia Clifford
- Séamus Ennis
- Maeve Donnelly
- Seamus Heaney
- Liam O'Flynn
- Tommy Potts
- Bernadette Greevy
- Derek Bell
- Dolores Keane
- John Doherty
- Matt Molloy
- Sean Keane
- Rita Keane
- Siobhán O'Brien
- James Byrne
- Len Graham
- Paul O'Shaughnessy
- Eileen Ivers

== See also ==
- List of record labels
