= Tiompan =

Stringed instrument used by Irish and British musicians

The tiompan (Scottish Gaelic), tiompán (Irish), or timpan (Welsh) was a stringed musical instrument used in medieval Ireland and Britain.

The word timpán was of both masculine and feminine gender in classical Irish. It is theorised to derive from the Latin word tympanum (tambourine or kettle drum) and timpán does appear to be used in certain ancient texts to describe a drum. Drum names applied to stringed instruments is not unheard of, such as tambour owing its name ultimately to the Persianتنبور (tambūr). Both tympanum and tambūr could be cognate with the Greek term πανδοῦρα (pandoûra). However, the tiompán is also thought to have been a kind of lyre, others contest it was a long-necked lute. Medieval writings on the tiompan have listed it as distinguished from "nine-stringed cruits", and that the tiompan commonly had three strings. These sources also make references to the tips and sides of the fingers being used on the strings, likely to stop them to produce higher notes. Whether all strings were stopped or just the top string, as with sitar or saz playing, is unknown. Sources give reference to the strings being metal, often bronze, and given the period to which tiompans are extant, resonating the strings by plucking is more likely than by bowing them. There is a high chance the name was reapplied to other instruments during the Early Modern Period.

The adjective timpánach referred to a performer on the instrument but is also recorded in one instance in the Dánta Grádha as describing a cruit. The feminine noun timpánacht referred to the art or practice of playing the tiompan.

In modern Irish traditional music, the word tiompán was used by Derek Bell, after Francis William Galpin's theories, to refer to the hammered dulcimer. Other hypothesised reproductions resemble the Welsh crwth, and the ancient Greek and Roman pandura.

Recorded players included Maol Ruanaidh Cam Ó Cearbhaill (murdered 1329). Finn Ó Haughluinn (died 1490) was the last recorded player of the instrument.

== See also ==
- Rotte (lyre)
