= Kevin Conneff =

Irish musician and songwriter

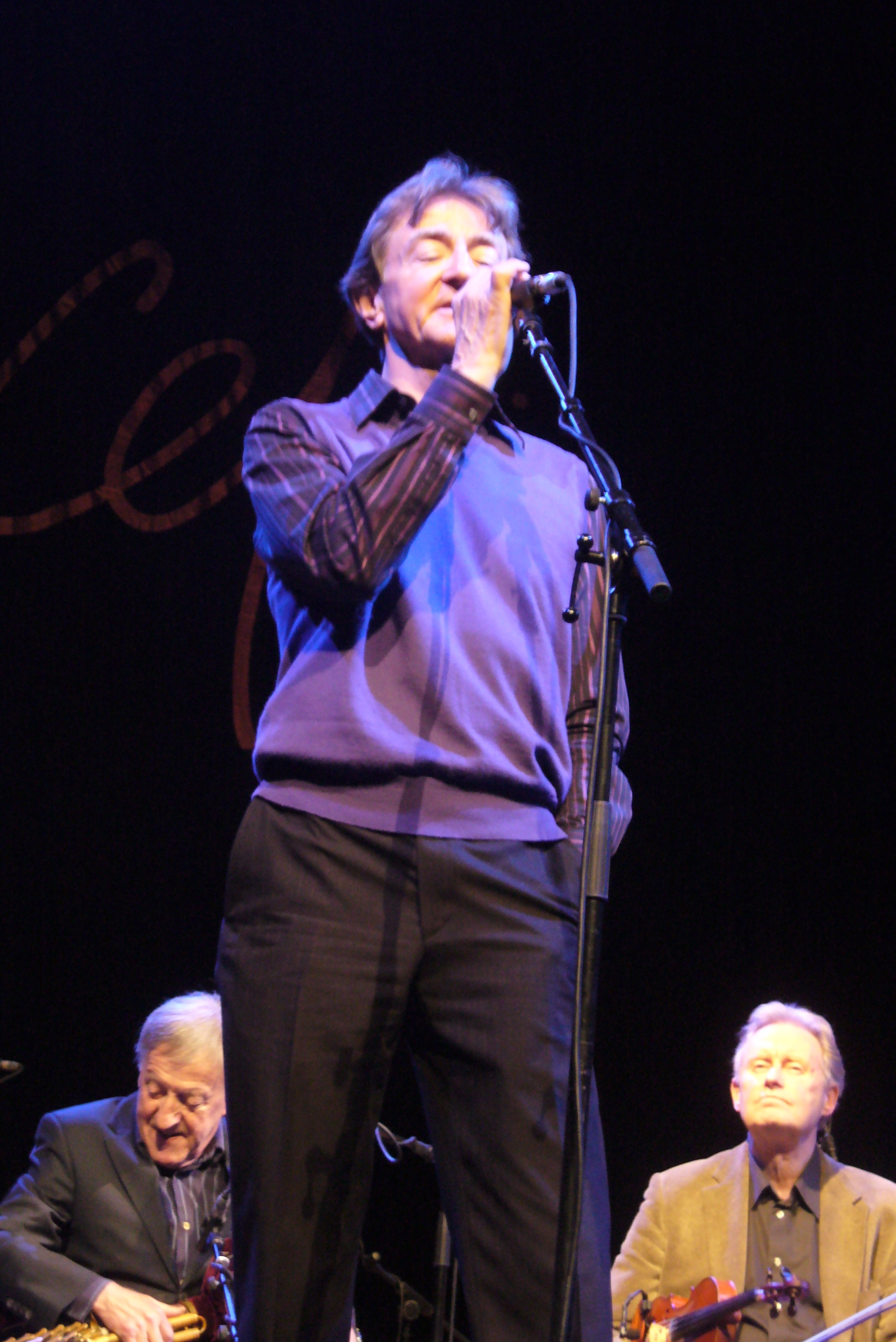
- Conneff in January 2010, with Paddy Moloney (left) and Seán Keane (right)

Background information
- Born: Kevin Conneff; 8 January 1945 (age 81)
- Origin: Donore, Dublin, County Dublin, Ireland
- Genres: Irish folk, Celtic
- Occupations: Singer, musician
- Instruments: Vocals, bodhrán
- Years active: 1963–present
- Labels: Claddagh, Island, RCA
- Formerly of: The Chieftains

Kevin Conneff is an Irish singer and musician, best known as the lead singer and bodhrán player of Irish folk group The Chieftains.

== Biography ==
Conneff was born and raised in the Donore Avenue area of Dublin. Music was an important part of his home life but, as he later related, he did not hear traditional music "from the womb", as had other members of the Chieftains.

He was introduced to Irish traditional music at the age of 18 when he began work as a photographic assistant for a printing machine company. A group of his colleagues hired a car every week to drive to local fleadhs (traditional Irish music festivals) and Conneff began attending weekend jam sessions, occasionally joining the musicians in songs.

He was greatly influenced by the traditional style of singing from the Donegal / Fermanagh region in Ireland, and particularly by the singing of Paddy Tunney. He took up the bodhrán after hearing one played on the radio, and the playing of Seán Ó Riada with Ceoltóirí Chualann.

Conneff was amazed at the power of the simple goatskin Irish frame drum. He soon mastered the bodhrán, and began playing and singing at sessions around Ireland, including in Dublin's traditional music venues. For many years he helped to run the Tradition Club, a haven for traditional musicians who included future Chieftains colleagues Paddy Moloney, Seán Keane and Michael Tubridy.

In the early 1970s, Conneff joined Christy Moore to record what became a benchmark album, Prosperous. He joined The Chieftains in 1976 after contributing to their album The Chieftains 6: Bonaparte's Retreat. Before joining the Chieftains he had maintained his printing job, and was also looking after his elderly mother.
