= Matt Molloy =

Irish musician (born 1947)

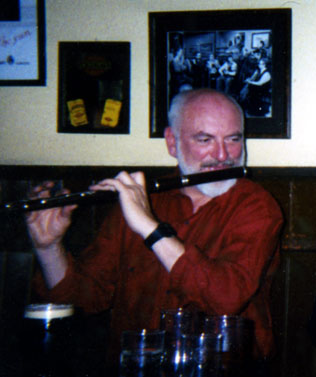
- Molloy playing in a session at his pub in Westport, County Mayo, March 2000

Background information
- Born: 12 January 1947 (age 79); Ballaghaderreen, County Roscommon, Ireland
- Genres: Irish Traditional Music
- Instrument: Flute

Matt Molloy (born 12 January 1947) is an Irish musician, from a region known for producing talented flautists. As a child, he began playing the flute and won the All-Ireland Flute Championship at nineteen. Considered one of the most brilliant Irish musicians, his style that adapts piping techniques to the flute has influenced many contemporary Irish flute players.

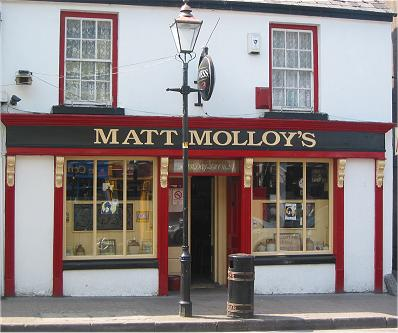
Matt Molloy's Pub in Bridge Street, Westport

During the 1970s, Molloy was a member of The Bothy Band and its successor, the re-founded Planxty. He joined The Chieftains in 1979, replacing Michael Tubridy. Over the course of his career, Molloy has worked with the Irish Chamber Orchestra, Paul Brady, Tommy Peoples, Micheál Ó Súilleabháin and Dónal Lunny. Molloy owns a pub called Matt Molloy's on Bridge Street in Westport, County Mayo where there are regular Irish music sessions.

== Discography ==
Solo Albums

- Matt Molloy with Donal Lunny (1976)
- Molloy, Brady, Peoples (1978) with Paul Brady and Tommy Peoples
- Contentment Is Wealth (1985) with Seán Keane
- Heathery Breeze (1981)
- Stony Steps (1987)
- The Fire Aflame (1992) with Seán Keane and Liam O'Flynn
- Music at Matt Molloy's (1993)
- Shadows on Stone (1996)
- Pathway to the Well (2007) with John Carty and Arty McGlynn
- Back to the Island (2019)

With The Bothy Band

- The Bothy Band (1975) Track listing at Irishtune
- Old Hag You Have Killed Me (1976) Track listing of 1982 reissue at Irishtune
- Out of the Wind – Into the Sun (1977) Track listing of 1985 reissue at Irishtune
- After Hours (Live in Paris) (1979) Track listing of 1984 reissue at Irishtune
- The Best of the Bothy Band (1980) Track listing of 1988 reissue at Irishtune
- The Bothy Band Live in Concert (1994) Track listing at Irishtune

Contributing artist

- H Block (1978), Compilation album produced by Christy Moore
- The Rough Guide to Irish Music (1996)
- The Guiding Moon (2007), album by The West Ocean String Quartet
