= Seán Potts =

Irish musician

Seán Desmond Potts (5 October 1930 – 11 February 2014) was an Irish musician. He was best known for his tin whistle playing and his long history with The Chieftains (from 1962 to 1979).

== Early life ==
Potts was born in The Liberties, Dublin, on 5 October 1930. He was a nephew of the fiddle player Tommie Potts.

== With The Chieftains ==
Potts was a founding member of The Chieftains. He was great friends with fellow band member and whistle player Paddy Moloney, and they often went around Dublin playing in sessions and gigging during the 1950s. In November 1962, Potts helped form The Chieftains. He briefly left the group in 1968 for a contract with Gael-Linn Records but returned to play for the band soon after. He was primarily a whistle player, although he also played the bodhrán and bones. He played with the band until 1979, when the pressures of the music scene (and touring) prompted him to leave the band for an easier life.

== Other bands ==
Before The Chieftains, Potts was an original member of Seán Ó Riada's group "Ceoltoirí Chualann". After The Chieftains, Potts did a lot of radio work for RTÉ and founded Bakerswell, with whom he undertook several fund-raising tours for NPU in the United States. In 1972, while still with The Chieftains, Potts and Paddy Moloney, along with Peadar Mercier (another Chieftains member) recorded an album called Tin Whistles where both Potts and Moloney played tin whistle tunes accompanied by a bodhrán. Potts also played the bodhrán and bones, and attempted to learn the uilleann pipes but admitted he never felt quite comfortable with the instrument and, after a few years at the pipes, he gave up and went back to the whistle.

== Later life ==
After Potts retired from the traditional scene, he could still be found playing at traditional festivals around the country and occasionally abroad. He served as chairman and Honorary President of Na Píobairí Uilleann in Dublin. He died at age 83 on 11 February 2014.

== Personal life ==
Seán and his wife Bernadett had four children.
