= Michael Tubridy =

Irish musician

Michael "Mick" Tubridy (born 6 August 1935 at Kilrush, County Clare, Ireland) is an Irish musician, step dancer and structural engineer.

== Career ==
In November 1962, he was a founder member of the traditional Irish music group, The Chieftains, with whom he played the tin whistle, Irish flute, and concertina; he remained a member of the group until 1979. In 1998 he published "A Selection of Irish Traditional Step Dances," a guide to sean nós (old-style) step dancing in which he recorded the steps of renowned Clare dancing masters James Keane and Dan Furey using a system of notation of his own invention. He is a member of the Craobh Naithí branch of Comhaltas Ceoltóirí Éireann and contributed to the publication of two books of Irish traditional tunes for the branch.

He worked as a structural engineer until his retirement in 1993. He was responsible for the structural design of government buildings in Merrion Street, Dublin, and of the passenger terminal buildings at Dublin Airport. In 1994, he was asked to re-design the Rosse Six Foot Telescope prior to its reconstruction in 1996/1997.
