= Derek Bell (musician) =

- Born: George Derek Fleetwood Bell; 21 October 1935; Belfast, Northern Ireland
- Died: 17 October 2002 (aged 66) Phoenix, Arizona, US
- Genres: Celtic music, rock
- Occupations: Musician, songwriter
- Instruments: Harp, piano, oboe, synthesizer
- Years active: 1947–2002

George Derek Fleetwood Bell, MBE (21 October 1935 – 17 October 2002) was a Northern Irish harpist, pianist, oboist, musicologist and composer who was best known for his accompaniment work on various instruments with The Chieftains.

== As classical composer and virtuoso ==
Bell was born in Belfast, Northern Ireland. Because he had been misdiagnosed at an early age as having a disease that would lead to blindness, his parents gave him a musical upbringing. He was something of a child prodigy, composing his first concerto at the age of 12. He graduated from the Royal College of Music in 1957. While studying there, he became friends with the flute player James Galway. From 1958 to 1990 he composed several classical works, including three piano sonatas, two symphonies, Three Images of Ireland in Druid Times (in 1993) for harp, strings and timpani, Nocturne on an Icelandic Melody (1997) for oboe d'amore and piano and Three Transcendental Concert Studies (2000) for oboe and piano. He had mastered and held a notable collection of instruments, including various harps, harpsichord, piano, cymbalom, and all the members of the oboe family of instruments (musette, oboe, cor anglais, bass oboe) and the heckelphone

As manager of the Belfast Symphony Orchestra, Bell was responsible for maintaining the instruments and keeping them in tune. Out of curiosity, he asked Sheila Larchet-Cuthbert to teach him how to play the harp. Over time he had many other harp teachers including Gwendolen Mason. In 1965 he became an oboist and harpist with the BBC Northern Ireland Orchestra. He had been known to be able to skilfully play the pedal harp, neo-Celtic harp, and wire-strung Irish-Bardic harp. Bell served as a professor of harp at the Academy of Music in Belfast.

Bell was briefly featured in a 1986 BBC documentary, The Celts, in which he discussed the role and evolution of the harp in Celtic Irish and Welsh society. Derek Bell also appeared with Van Morrison at the Riverside Theatre at the University of Ulster in April 1988. An hour-long BBC special was broadcast in which Derek Bell talks extensively as well as accompanying Morrison on several songs including "On Raglan Road". The video is available on YouTube in full "VAN MORRISON - In Conversation and Music 1988". Apart from this, video of him only exists in minor interviews and performances with The Chieftains.

== As dulcimer player ==
The hammered dulcimer is documented as having been played in Ireland in the 18th century and is mentioned by James Joyce as an instrument he heard being played in the street. Bell introduced a small cimbalom (a hammered dulcimer from central and eastern Europe), which he called tiompan after the medieval Irish instrument.

Bell was an admirer of the music of Nikolai Karlovich Medtner and was the co-founder, with the bass-baritone Hugh Sheehan, of the first British Medtner Society which gave a series of successful concerts of Medtner's music in the 1970s long before Medtner's music was recognised as it is today.

== The Chieftains ==
On Saint Patrick's Day in 1972 Bell performed on the radio the music of Turlough O'Carolan, an 18th-century blind Irish harpist. Working with Bell on the project were several members of The Chieftains. Bell became friends with the leader of the Chieftains, Paddy Moloney. For two precarious years, he recorded both with the BBC Northern Ireland Orchestra and with The Chieftains, until finally becoming a full-time member of the Chieftains in 1975.

== Eccentricity ==
Bell was the only member of the band to wear a tie at every public performance. He favoured socks with novelty designs, such as images of Looney Tunes characters. He wore scruffy suits, often with trousers that were too short. He was eccentric and told obscene jokes. The title of his 1981 solo album Derek Bell Plays With Himself has a conscious double-entendre. While touring in Moscow he grabbed his alarm clock and put it in his pocket while rushing to catch a plane. He was then stopped by the Soviet police on suspicion of carrying a concealed weapon. Paddy Moloney affectionately called him "Ding Dong" Bell. He relished the eclectic collaborations, such as those with Van Morrison, Sting and the Chinese orchestra. In 1991 he recorded with his old friend James Galway. In 1997, A Celtic Evening with Derek Bell, featuring Mairéid Sullivan, was recorded in concert at The Mountain View Center for the Performing Arts, Mountain View, California. He was awarded an MBE in the 2000 Queen's Birthday Honours for services to traditional music.

== Eastern religions ==
From the early 1960s, Bell was a friend of Swami Kriyananda, also known as J. Donald Walters (also an avid composer of music for the Irish harp). Bell and some associates visited Kriyananda at his spiritual centre in Ananda village in Nevada City, California. Bell wrote a preface to an edition of Kriyananda's book Art As a Hidden Message. He writes, "After reading it, I decided to get in touch with him... I also visited Ananda several times, the beautiful village Kriyananda himself founded in 1968... I offered to record some of Kriyananda's music." His first album, Mystic Harp, with Kriyananda was positively reviewed by the New York Times, "This is a lovely, light album full of charm and innocence [...] The Mystic Harp will take you to places that stretch from the innocence of childhood to the mystery and otherworldliness of the spiritual." His final album was also with Kriyananda, Mystic Harp vol II, a collection of compositions in a new age style for solo harp quite different from the traditional and classical compositions for which he was otherwise known. In August 2002, only weeks before his death, Bell visited Kriyananda. Although he was raised as a Protestant, he became a Buddhist later in life.

== Death ==
Bell died of cardiac arrest in Phoenix, Arizona on 17 October 2002, just four days shy of his 67th birthday. He is remembered at Cambridge House Grammar School, Ballymena, as House Patron of Bell House.

== Solo discography ==
- Carolan's Receipt (1975)
- Carolan's Favourite (1980)
- Derek Bell Plays With Himself (1981)
- Musical Ireland (1982)
- From Sinding To Swing (1983)
- Ancient Music for the Irish Harp (1989)
- Mystic Harp (1996)
- A Celtic Evening with Derek Bell, featuring Mairéid Sullivan (1997)
- Mystic Harp (Volume II) (1999)
