= Seán Keane (fiddler) =

Irish musician (1946–2023)

Seán Keane Seán Ó Catháin
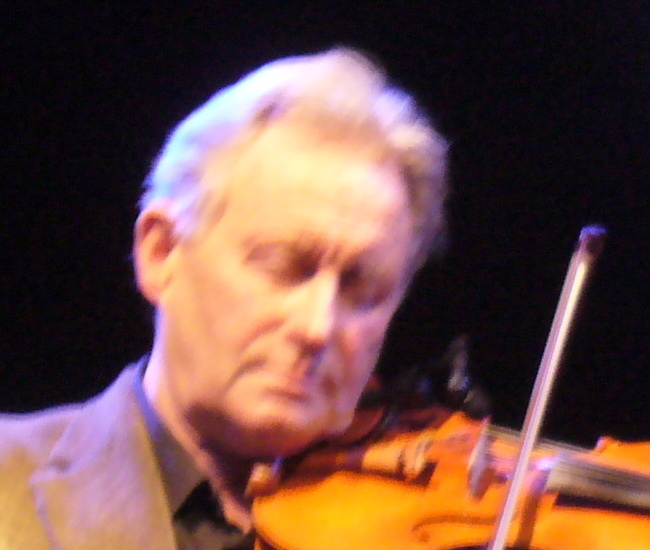
- Keane performing in 2010

Background information
- Born: 12 July 1946; Drimnagh, Dublin, Ireland
- Died: 7 May 2023 (aged 76) Rathcoole, Dublin, Ireland
- Genres: Folk, Traditional Irish
- Occupations: Musician; teacher
- Instrument: Fiddle
- Years active: 1960s–2023
- Labels: Claddagh; Island; RCA; Shanachie
- Formerly of: Ceoltóirí Chualann; Paddy Moloney; The Chieftains; Matt Molloy; Mick Moloney; Liam O'Flynn; James Keane
- Website: thechieftains.com

Seán Keane (Irish: Seán Ó Catháin; 12 July 1946 – 7 May 2023) was an Irish fiddler, teacher and member of The Chieftains. He was a member of Ceoltóirí Chualann in the 1960s, before joining The Chieftains in 1968. He had a unique style, especially in his use of ornamentation, perhaps influenced by the music of the uilleann pipes.

== Early life ==
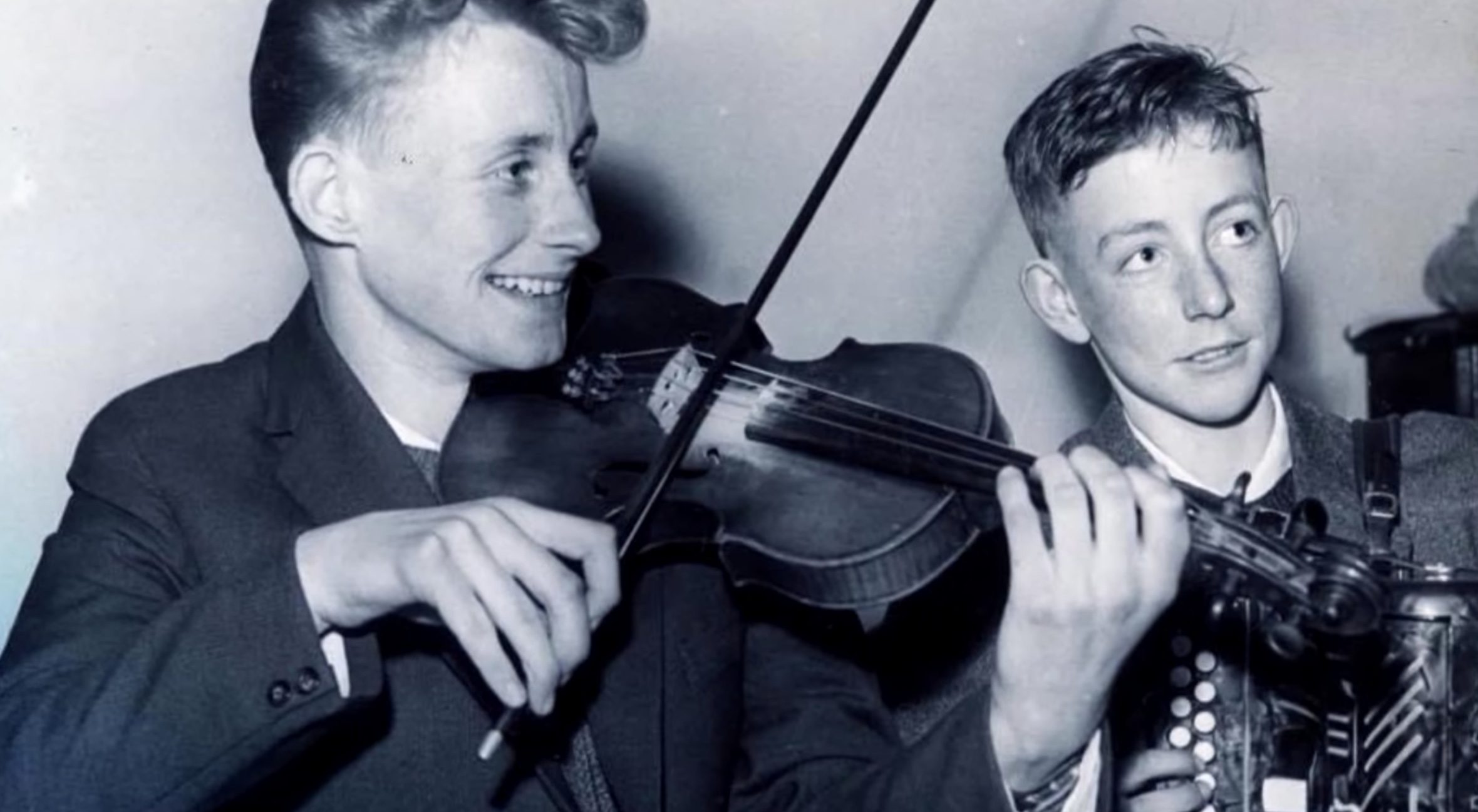
Seán with his brother James Keane

Keane was born into a musical family in Drimnagh, a suburb of Dublin, Ireland. Keane's mother and father were both fiddle players from musical communities in County Longford and County Clare, respectively, and would host many traditional players who traveled from all over Ireland to perform in Dublin city. The Keane household became a landmark in Dublin's traditional music scene in the 1950s and 1960s. These guests greatly influenced Keane and his brother, James, an accordion player, as did their summer trips to Longford and Clare where they encountered much traditional music.

== Legacy ==
In May 1981, Keane was profiled on RTÉ's Hand Me Down series, which looks at how traditional music is handed on from generation to generation. Each program features a traditional artist and looks at how they inherited Irish music from their family. In this extract from the program, Keane plays solo before accompanying members of the Castle Céilí Band with the Mullagh set dancers at the Willie Clancy Summer School. The Castle Céilí Band were reformed especially for the program which is now archived in the RTÉ Libraries and Archives.

In March 2019, Keane was featured on Season 8 episode 1 of TG4's documentary series 'Sé Mo Laoch, which features some of Ireland's greatest traditional musicians. The 25 minute-long documentary looked at his life and career from his childhood up until the present day and is archived on TG4 Player.

== Personal life ==
Keane was married and had three children.

Keane died on 7 May 2023, at the age of 76.

== Discography ==
=== Solo albums ===
- Gusty's Frolics (1975)
- Seán Keane (1982)
- Jig it in Style (1990)

=== Collaborations ===
- Roll Away the Reel World (with James Keane and Mick Moloney) (1980)
- Contentment is Wealth (with Matt Molloy and Arty McGlynn) (1985)
- The Fire Aflame (with Matt Molloy and Liam O'Flynn) (1993)
- Fire in the Kitchen (with Paddy Moloney) (1998)
