= Martin Fay =

Irish musician (1936–2012)

Martin Joseph Fay (19 September 1936 – 14 November 2012) was an Irish fiddler and bones player, and a former member of The Chieftains.

Fay was born in Cabra, Dublin, Ireland. In 1962, he became one of the founding members of The Chieftains. In 2001, he decided to stop touring with The Chieftains, limiting his appearances with the group to events in Ireland. He subsequently retired in 2002. He died in Cabra at age 76. He had been ill for some time.
