= Paddy Moloney =

Irish musician (1938–2021)

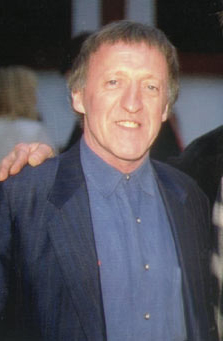
- Moloney in March 2009

Background information
- Born: 1 August 1938; Dublin, Ireland
- Died: 12 October 2021 (aged 83) Dublin, Ireland
- Genre: Traditional Irish music
- Occupations: Musician; composer; record producer
- Instruments: Uilleann pipes; tin whistle; button accordion; bodhrán
- Years active: 1960–2021
- Labels: Claddagh Records; Shanachie Records; Mercury Records; RCA Victor; Hear Music

Paddy Moloney (Irish: Pádraig Ó Maoldomhnaigh; 1 August 1938 – 12 October 2021) was an Irish musician, composer, and record producer. He co-founded and led the Irish musical group the Chieftains, playing on all of their 44 albums. He was particularly associated with the revival of the uilleann pipes.

== Early life ==
Moloney was born in the Donnycarney area of Dublin on 1 August 1938, the son of housewife Catherine (née Conroy) and Irish Glass Bottle Company accountant John Moloney. His mother bought him a tin whistle when he was six and he started to learn the uilleann pipes at the age of eight.

== Musical career ==
In addition to the tin whistle and the uilleann pipes, Moloney also played button accordion and bodhrán.

=== As a band musician ===
==== Ceoltóirí Chualann ====
Moloney first met Seán Ó Riada in the late 1950s. He then joined Ó Riada's group, Ceoltóirí Chualann, in 1960.

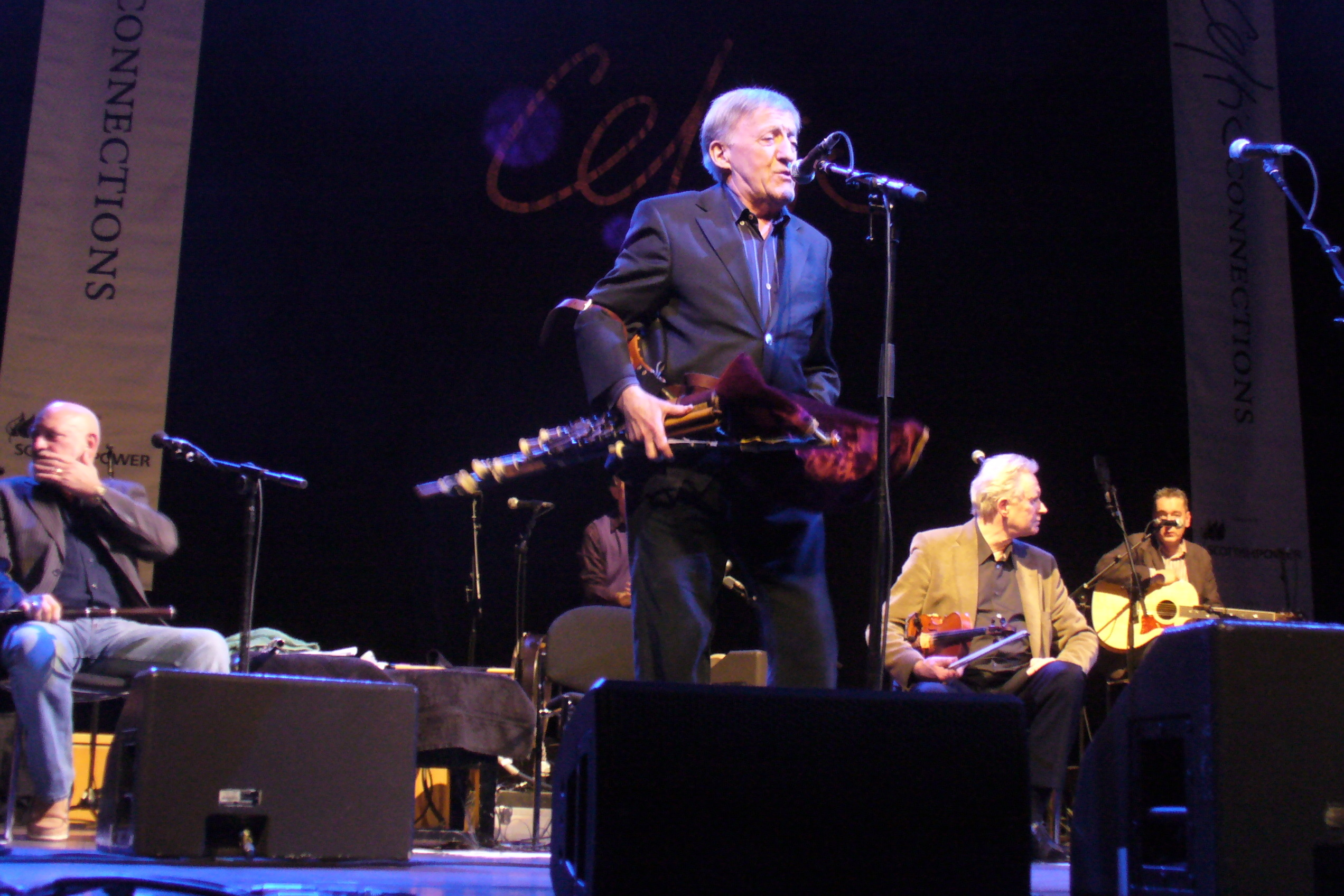
Moloney and the Chieftains in 2010

==== The Chieftains ====
Along with Sean Potts and Michael Tubridy, Moloney formed the traditional Irish band the Chieftains in Dublin in November 1962. As the band leader, he was the primary composer and arranger of much of the Chieftains' music, and composed for films including Treasure Island, The Grey Fox, Braveheart, Gangs of New York, and Stanley Kubrick's Barry Lyndon.

=== As a session musician ===
Moloney did session work for Mike Oldfield, The Muppets, Mick Jagger, Gary Moore, Paul McCartney, Sting, Don Henley, and Stevie Wonder.

=== As a producer ===
Together with Garech de Brún (anglicised to Garech Browne) of Luggala, he founded Claddagh Records in 1959. In 1968 he became a producer for the label and supervised the recording of 45 albums.

== Personal life and death ==
Moloney was married to artist Rita O'Reilly from 1962 until his death in 2021. They met during the 1950s while he was working for Baxendale & Company. They had three children, including Aedin. He was a fluent speaker of Irish.

Moloney died suddenly at a hospital in Dublin on 12 October 2021, at the age of 83. His funeral was held on 15 October at St. Kevin's Church in Glendalough, followed by a burial at the adjoining cemetery.

== Tributes ==
Irish President Michael D. Higgins said, "The Irish music community, and indeed the much larger community throughout the world who found such inspiration in his work, will have learned with great sadness today of the passing of Paddy Moloney. [...] Paddy, with his extraordinary skills as an instrumentalist, notably the uilleann pipes and bodhrán, was at the forefront of the renaissance of interest in Irish music, bringing a greater appreciation of Irish music and culture internationally."

Maura McGrath, chairwoman of the National Concert Hall in Dublin, said, "His musical achievement with the Chieftains was, and will continue to be, recognised as outstanding, transcending all musical boundaries, and connecting Irish people everywhere with their unique sound. Paddy's contribution to, and support of, the National Concert Hall throughout his lifetime has been immense."

== Selected discography ==
Main source:

- Paddy Moloney and others – The Drones and Chanters: Irish Pipering (1971)
- Paddy Moloney and Sean Potts – Tin Whistles (1974)
- Silent Night: A Christmas in Rome (1998)
- John Montague & Paddy Moloney – The Wild Dog Rose (2011)

== Awards and honours ==
Moloney received the Ohtli Award, Mexico's highest cultural award, on 13 September 2012. On 28 June of the following year, he and the other members of the Chieftains received the Castelao Medal by the Government of Galicia, Spain for services to Galician culture and society. He was named a Commander of the Order of Civil Merit in Spain four years later.
