= South Leith Parish Church =

Church in Edinburgh, Scotland

North & South Leith Parish Church
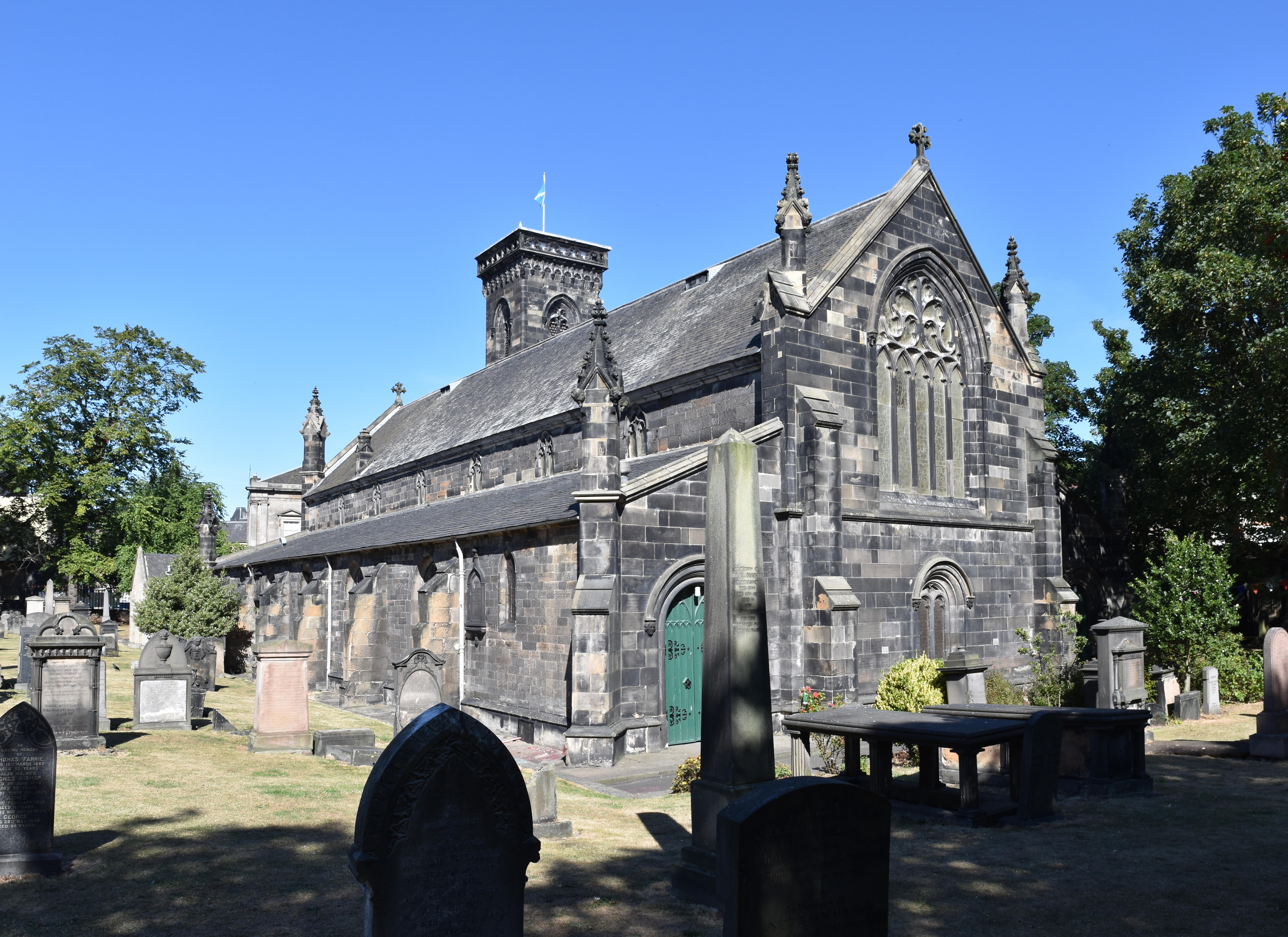
- The Constitution Street side of the church
- North & South Leith Parish Church
- 55°58′19″N 3°10′22″W
- Location: Between Constitution Street and the Kirkgate, near the foot of Leith Walk in Leith, Edinburgh's harbour district
- Country: Scotland
- Denomination: Church of Scotland
- Website: https://nslpc.co.uk/

History
- Former name: St Mary's
- Status: Church
- Founded: 1487

Architecture
- Functional status: Active
- Heritage designation: Category A listed

Specifications
- Capacity: c.1400
- Materials: stone

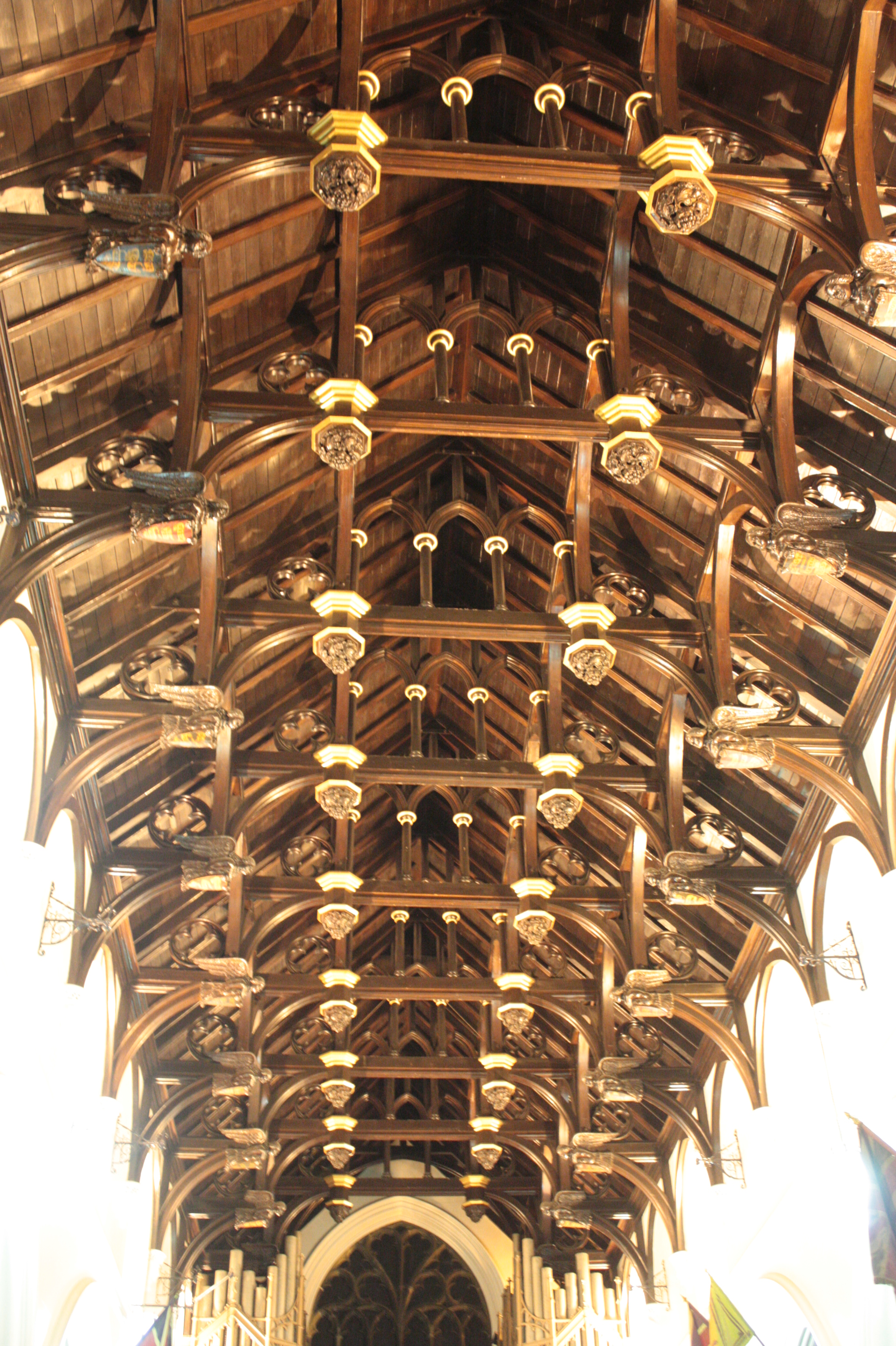
The stunning hammerhead timber ceiling of South Leith Parish Church

North and South Leith Parish Church, originally the Kirk of Our Lady, St Mary, is a congregation of the Church of Scotland. Prior to the union with the former North Leith Parish Church in 2024, the building was known as South Leith Parish Church.

It is the principal church and congregation in Leith, in Edinburgh. Its kirkyard is the burial place for John Home (author of Douglas) and John Pew, the man from whom the author Robert Louis Stevenson reputedly derived the character of Blind Pew in the novel Treasure Island. 18th-century Scottish Episcopal Church bishop and historian Robert Forbes also lies buried beneath the church floor. The church has been repaired, used as an ammunition store and reconstructed but still retains the basic layout of the nave of the old church.

== History ==
The use of the site for religious purpose began in 1430 when Sir Robert Logan of Restalrig built a monastery dedicated to St Anthony on the site.

The church has a long history although most of the visible building is more recent. The church was founded as a Roman Catholic chapel dedicated to St Mary erected in 1483 and dedicated in 1487. (From the twelfth century South Leith had been part of the parish of Restalrig and had no church of its own.) As part of the dedication King James III of Scotland gave 18 shillings to the kirk. The church was originally a large one, with nave, chancel, crossing and transepts. The present building is a reconstruction of just the nave of the original church. The eastern parts of the church were probably destroyed during the siege of Leith in 1560.

In 1544 the church was used as a refuge for people displaced by the fighting when the English army attacked Leith as part of the Rough Wooing when King Henry VIII of England sent his forces to invade southern Scotland to try to compel a marriage between the infant Mary, Queen of Scots, and the English prince Edward. Refuge was required as Henry had ordered that Leith should be burnt. In the following year the Protestant martyr, George Wishart preached at the church and John Knox is thought to have been amongst those who came to listen. In 1547 the church was again involved in the struggle between the invading English and the Scots when the English used the church as a makeshift prison for Scottish nobles.

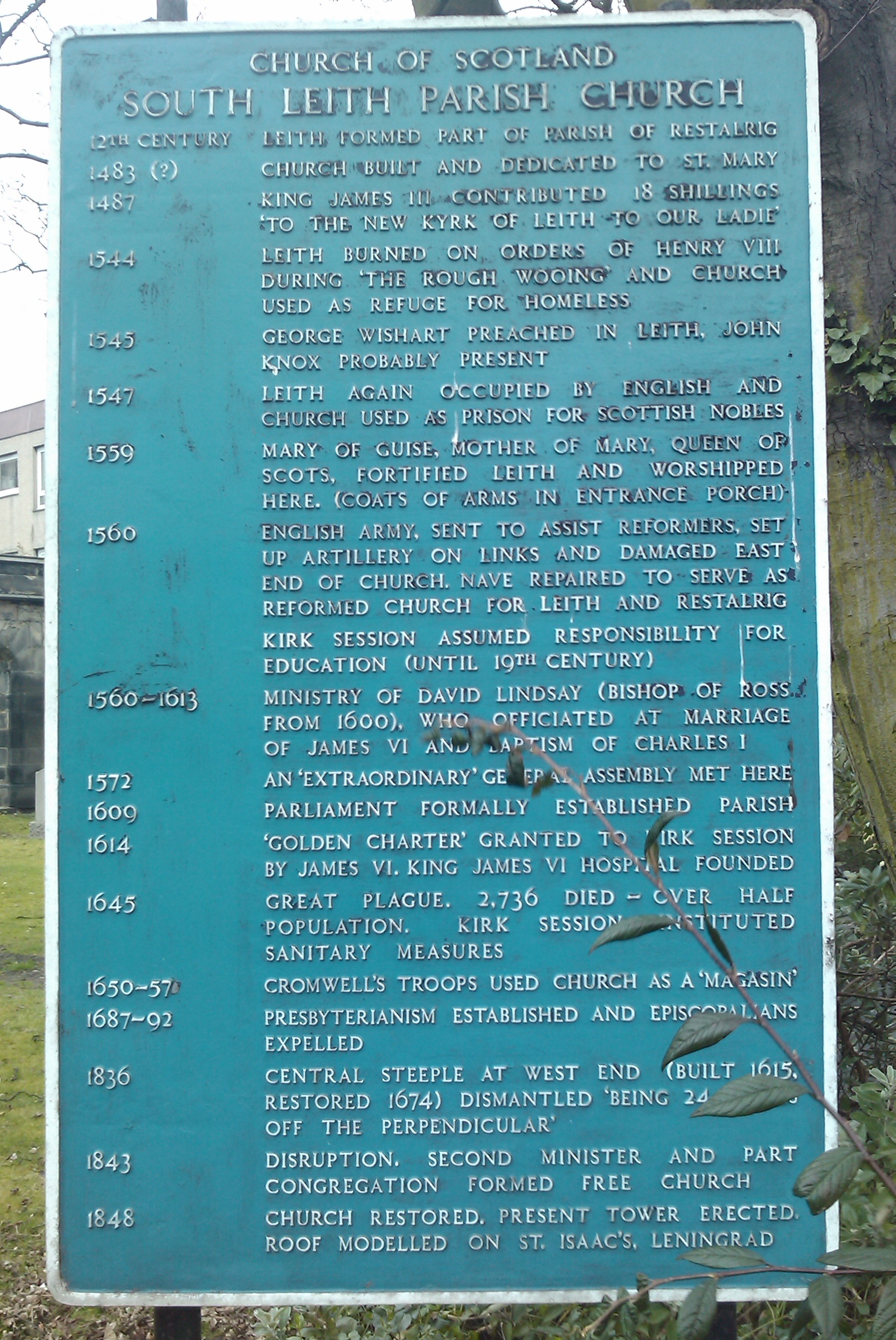
The history of the church

In 1559, Mary of Guise, the regent of Scotland, worshipped at this church. Her coat of arms is displayed in the entrance of the church today. Mary had fortified the burgh with a wall and had her palace in Leith, guarded by the thousands of French troops garrisoned there.

== Siege of Leith ==
In the following year, 1560, the English fleet and troops arrived at the invitation of Protestant Lords of the Congregation to lay siege to Leith in order that the French might be persuaded to leave. The church was damaged by English artillery fire, and this was probably when the eastern parts were destroyed. The French and the English troops did leave under the terms of the Treaty of Edinburgh, although the treaty was never formally ratified.

The consequences of the treaty and the peace that followed made enormous changes to the role of this church. Nearby Restalrig Church was the parish church. That church could trace its history back to events in the year 700 when Saint Rule and Saint Triduana had arrived in Scotland. Triduana had stayed on in Scotland and when she died the church of Restalrig was founded at that place. Now however feelings had changed and by the order of the General Assembly that church was razed to the ground and this church, although damaged, became the new church of the parish of Leith. The church became the de facto Parish Kirk for South Leith after Restalrig Kirk, which up until then had served that community, was demolished by order of the newly formed General Assembly.

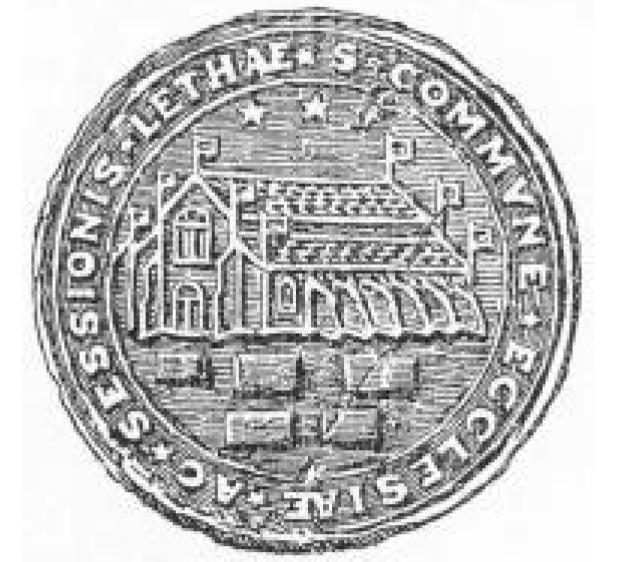
The 1608 seal

The form of worship at the church was also changed from Roman Catholic to Presbyterian, as a consequence of the Reformation. The church came under the ministry of David Lindsay who became the Bishop of Ross.

The new arrangement of power took time to settle down. In 1571 there was much discussion regarding the transfer of church positions. Noblemen were becoming bishops without any further qualification and positions in the church were being given to inappropriate people – including some who were still not legally adult. In 1572 an "extraordinary" general meeting was called by the regent (the Earl of Mar) and held here. The meeting made resolutions but they were not fully implemented as the King, James VI of Scotland was still a minor.

On 1 May 1590, James VI and his wife Anne of Denmark arrived in the Port of Leith. After a welcoming speech in French by James Elphinstone at the shore, Anne stayed in the King's Wark and James went alone to hear a sermon by Patrick Galloway in the Parish kirk.

The new status for the South Leith kirk as Parish church was confirmed by Act of Parliament in 1609. This was recorded in the parish records which still survive back to May 1597. The seal of a charter granted in 1608 to a James Hall shows the church as being not dissimilar to its present appearance. The kirk records record that in 1615 the church was added to with a central steeple.

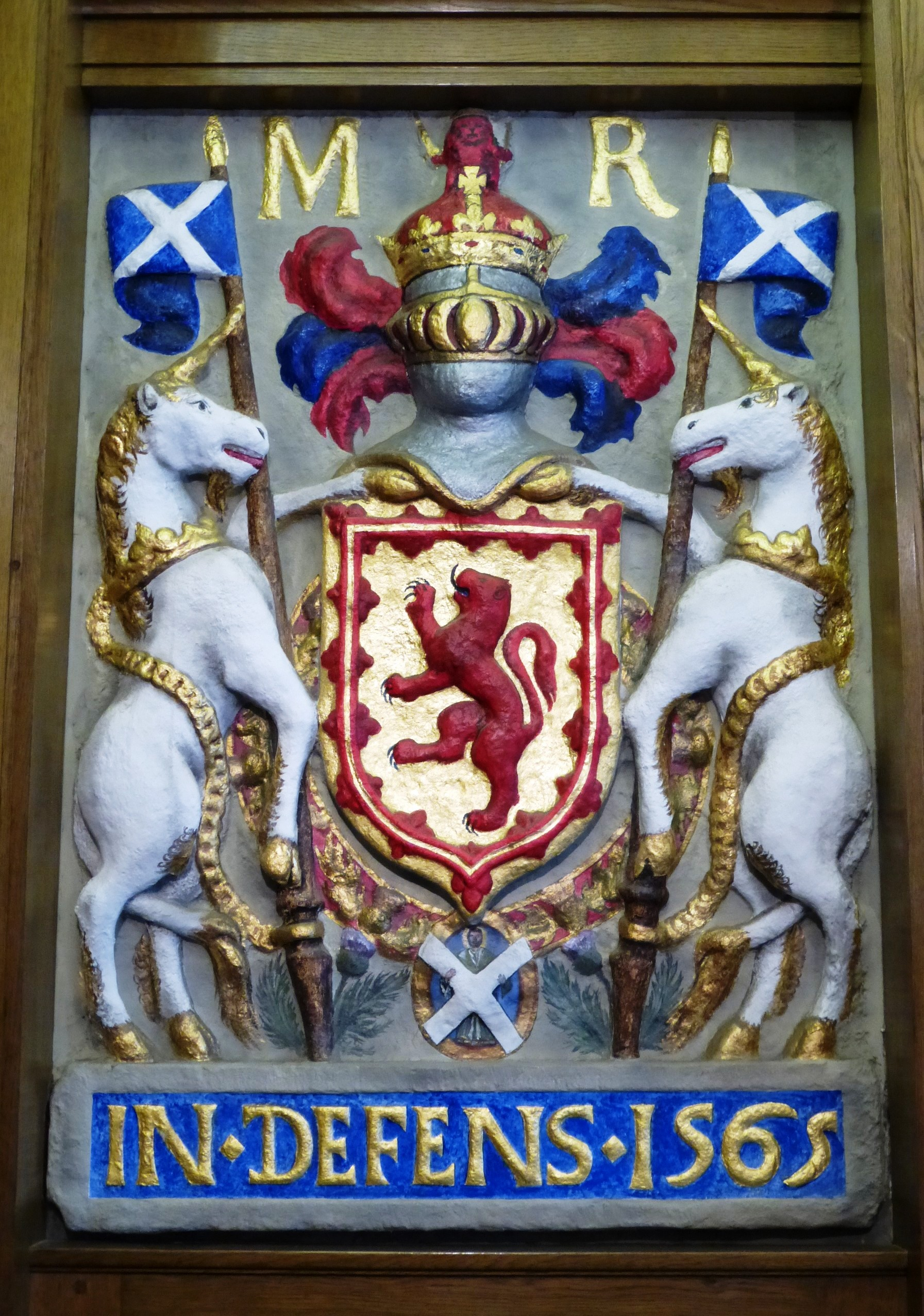
Queen Mary's royal coat of arms (1565), removed from Leith Tolbooth and built into the church porch

In the middle of the 17th century the church was involved in initiating and supervising sanitary measures and relieving the distress of victims during the Plague of 1645. Over 2,700 people lost their lives – this was half the population. From 1650 to 1657 the Parliamentarians used the church as a magazine during the Wars of the Three Kingdoms. The kirk records record the problems at that time with church services having to be conducted wherever space allowed.

From 1687 until 1692 the confirmation of the congregations as Presbyterian was demonstrated as the church expelled those who were Episcopalian.

== 18th and 19th centuries ==
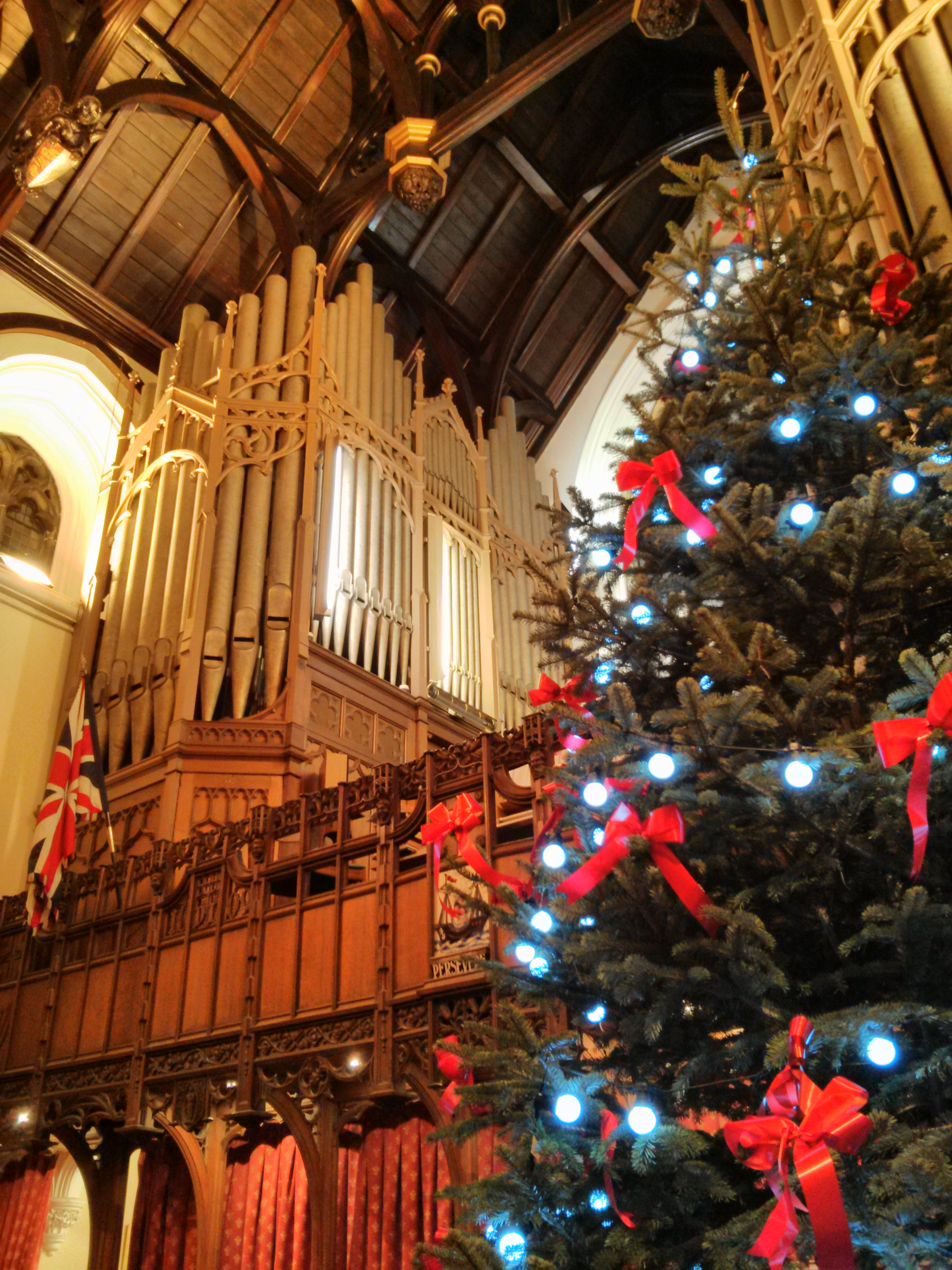
The organ and hammerbeam ceiling at Christmas

In 1766 the new minister was Henry Hunter who went on to publish sermons and translate the work of leading French scientists.

From 1824 until 1843 the minister was Rev James Grant (1800–1890) who came to later fame as the longest serving Director of Scottish Widows (1840 to 1890) and served as Moderator of the General Assembly of the Church of Scotland in 1854. During his ministry, in 1836 the central steeple that had stood since 1615 was dismantled. William Burn reported that this was essential as the steeple rested on the original west wall whilst the other newer walls had sunk and caused the tower to lean.

The Disruption of 1843 caused an inevitable loss of congregation. However the church recovered and reconstruction and restoration of the building took place 1847–48. The architect was Thomas Hamilton. The layout of the old church was retained, and the nave arcade and the lower part of the aisle walls are original. The aisle roofs were lowered, and the tracery of the windows replaced. A new square tower was built at the NW. Inside there is a magnificent hammerbeam nave roof said to be based on St Isaac's in St Petersburg. The west window was salvaged and re-used at St Conan’s Kirk. The church is a category A listed building.

The reconstruction was criticised both at the time and later. Daniel Wilson writing in 1847 wrote that the architect "with the perverse ingenuity of modern restorers, preserved only the more recent and least attractive portions of the venerable edifice. As some slight atonement for this, the removal of the high-pitched roof of the side aisles has brought to light a range of very neat square-headed clerestory windows, which had remained concealed for upwards of two centuries, and which it is fortunately intended to retain in the restoration of the building". It was not to be. The clerestory windows were replaced with traceried Gothic windows. In 1925 William Swan, minister of the church, remarked that in 1846 "unfortunately it was determined to restore the fabric by rebuilding large portions of it. I say deliberately unfortunately because had they left it alone for another quarter of a century, a period would have been reached when the art of church restoration had come to be historically and artistically understood."

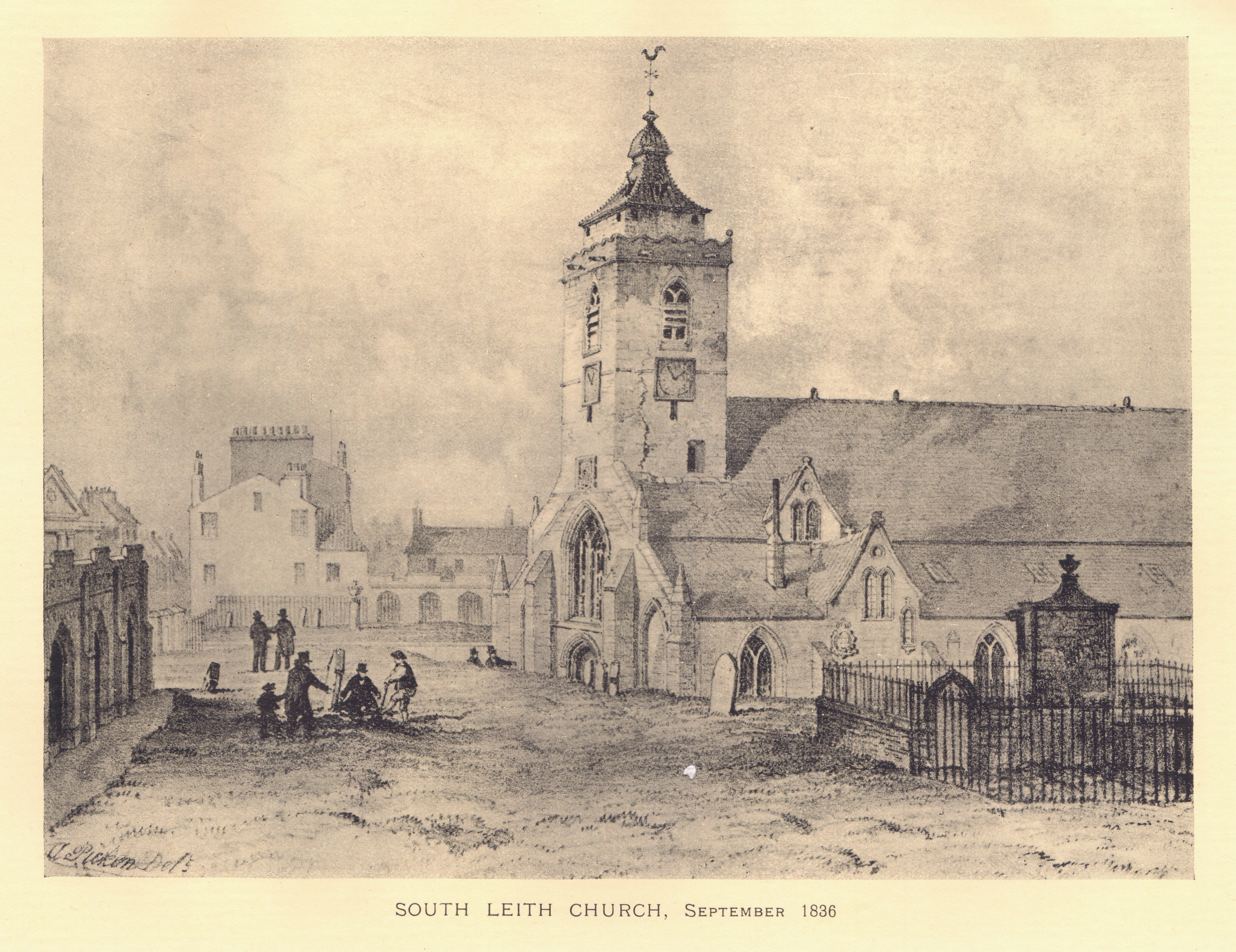
The west end of the church in 1836, showing the cracks and lean in the tower

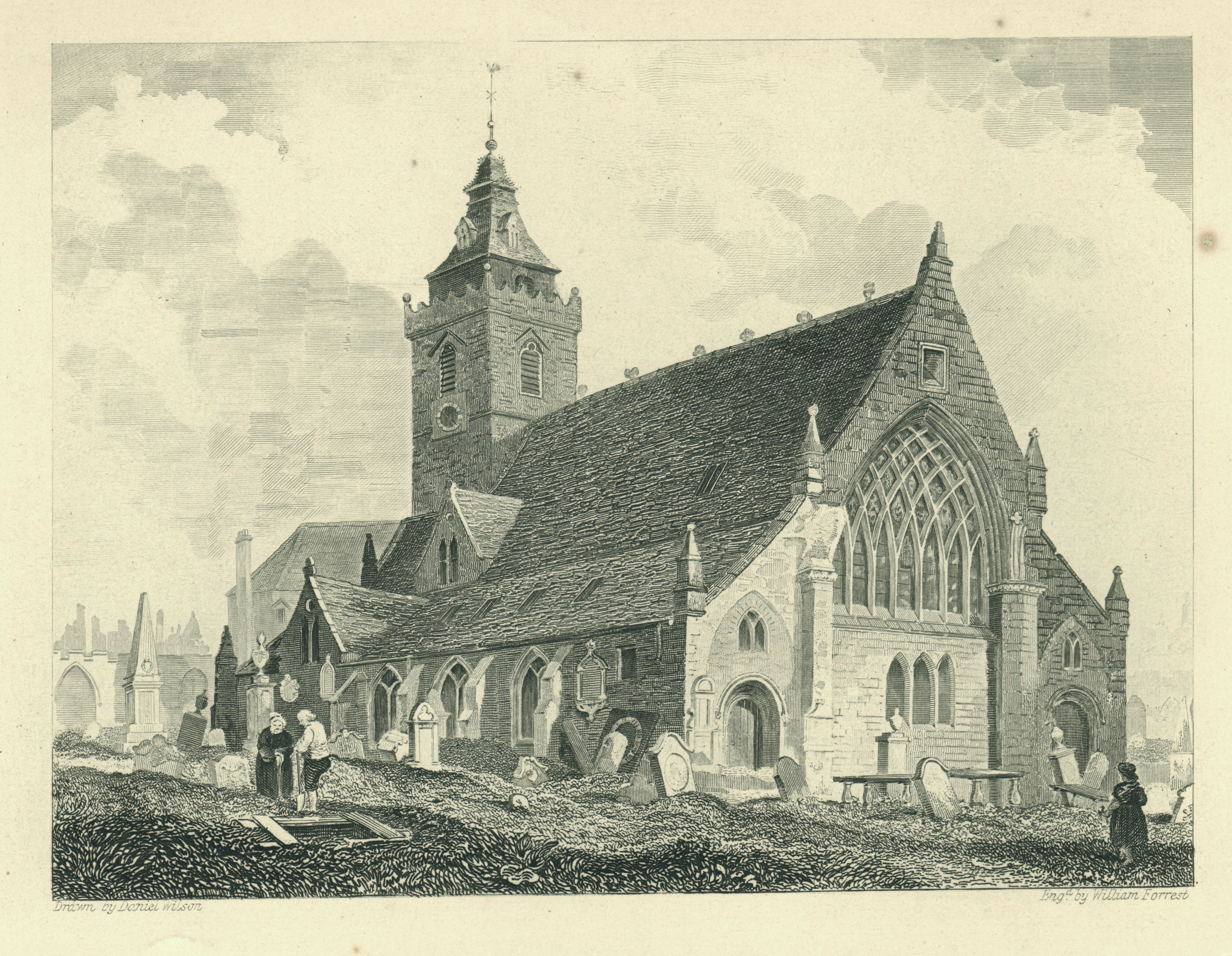
St Mary's Church from the SE, before the west tower and spire were removed in 1836

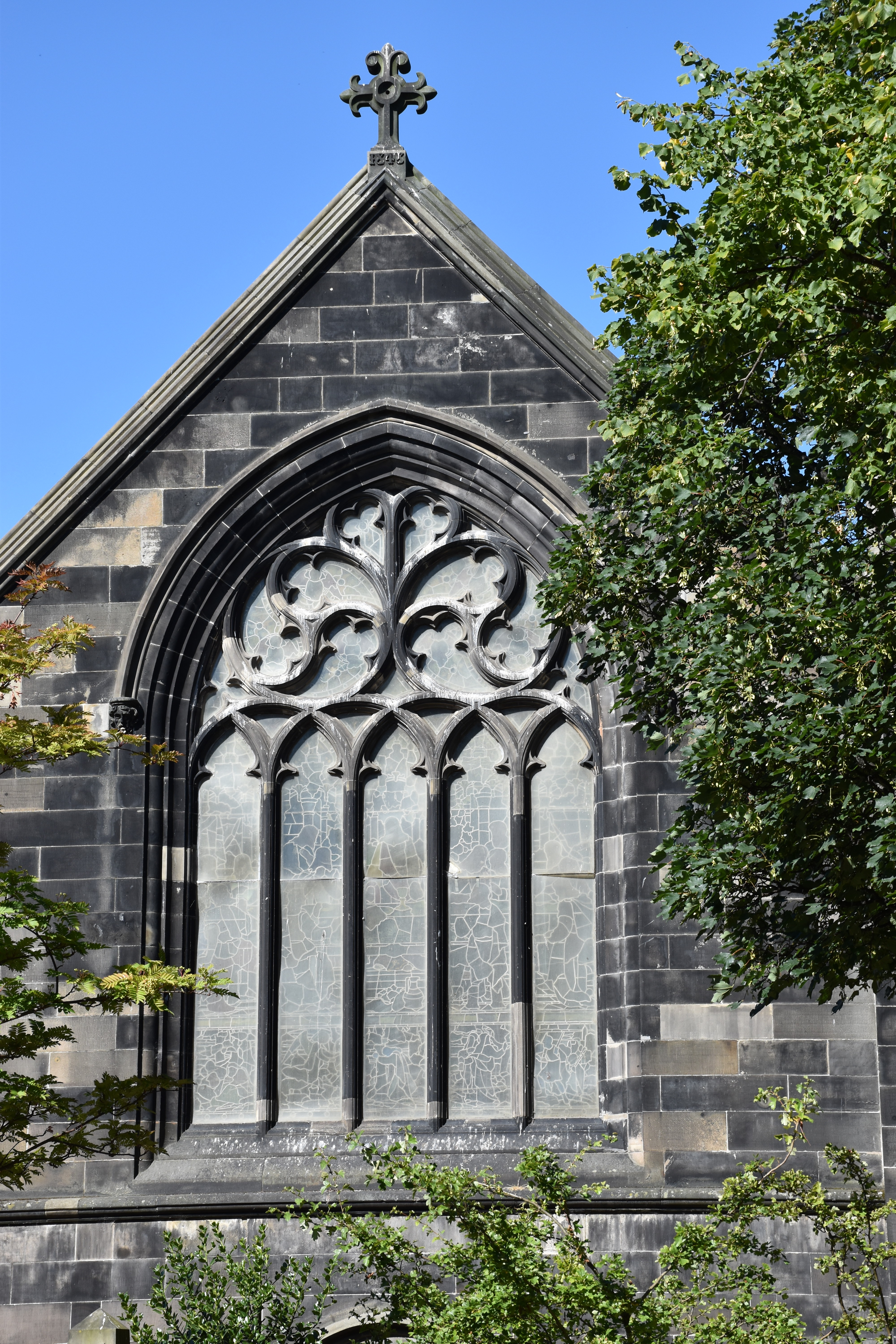
The new east window of 1847–1848

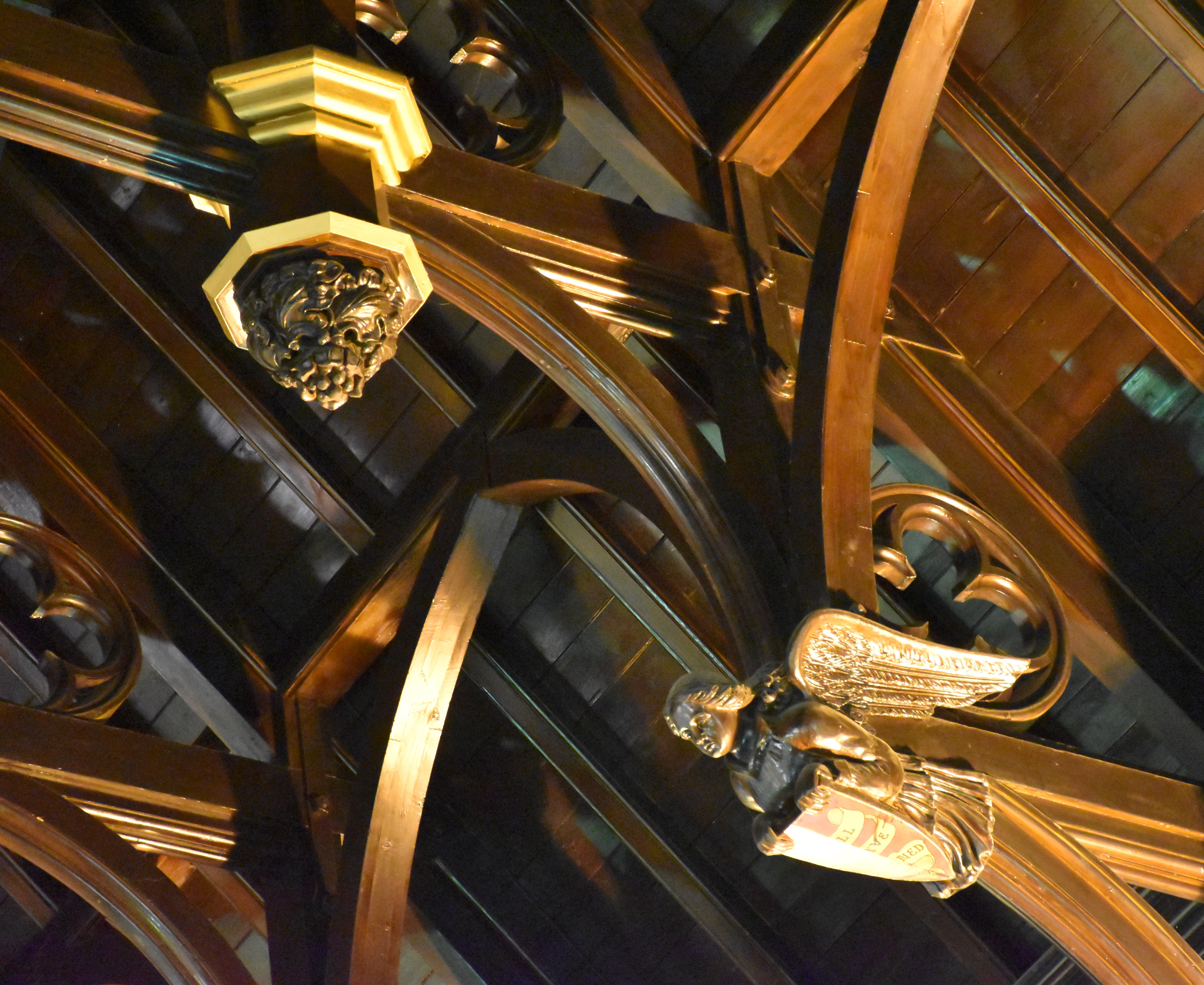
Detail of the hammerbeam roof

In 1915 over 200 soldiers were killed and a similar number seriously injured in the Quintinshill rail disaster at Gretna. The soldiers were from the 1st/7th Battalion, The Royal Scots (The Royal Regiment) which was a Territorial Battalion before World War I. The majority of the soldiers were recruited from Leith, with others recruited from nearby Musselburgh and Portobello. The Colours of this Battalion are still kept at the church in memory of the loss to the community. The soldiers are buried in Rosebank Cemetery in nearby Pilrig.

== Location ==
South Leith Parish Kirk is situated on the Kirkgate, Leith, currently a pedestrian precinct. It sits within the parish which has been described as triangular having three main borders. On the west it borders the historic parishes of North Leith, Edinburgh and St Cuthbert's; on the south by Duddingston and Cannongate and the remaining border on the north east is the natural barrier of the Firth of Forth. Historically the parish covered about 2,200 acres (8.9 km^{2}) but over time newer parishes have been identified within its borders as the surrounding population grew and rearranged.

The church is home to the 10th Leith Boys Brigade Company and the Girl Guides. They meet at the church's halls in nearby Henderson Street.

== Manse ==
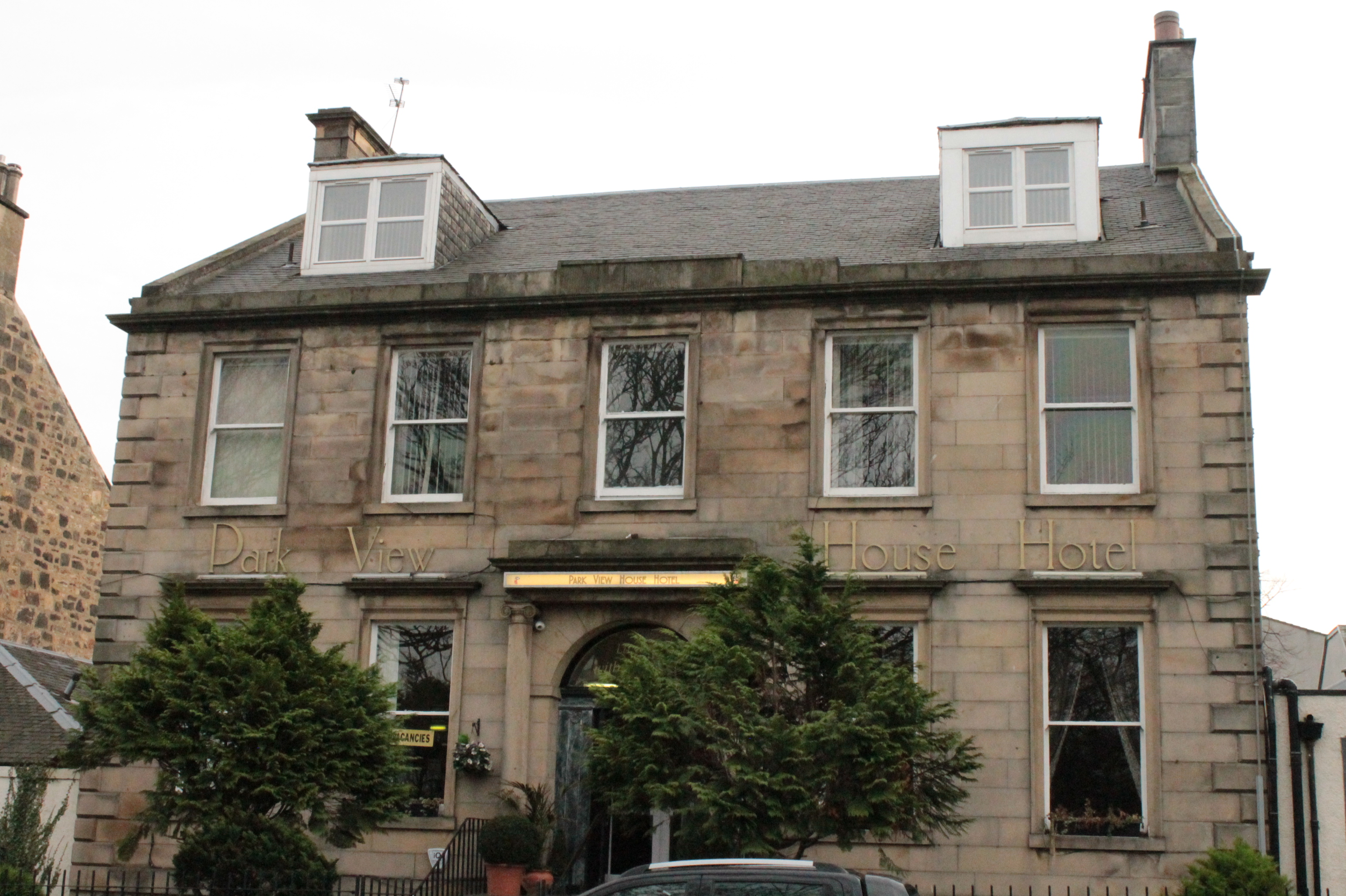
Former South Leith Parish Church manse, 14 Hermitage Place

The original manse was presumably on the Kirkgate but its location is unknown. A new manse was built at Hermitage Place, facing onto Leith Links in 1820. This old manse still exists but is now a hotel. The current manse is on Claremont Road, further to the east.

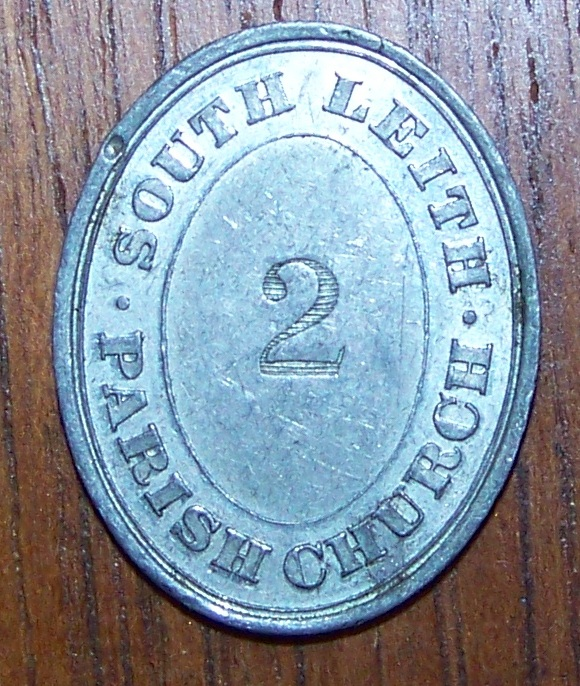
A communion token issued by the church.

== Memorials ==
The graveyard or kirkyard is the burial place for the playwright John Home, author of Douglas, and John Pew, the man from whom the author Robert Louis Stevenson reputedly derived the character of Blind Pew in the novel Treasure Island. Pew was a maltman and was reputed to have had 25 children. Stevenson was related to the Balfour family so he may have seen the Pew grave whilst visiting the church of his family. Other notable people are Adam White who was Leith's first Provost, Hugo Arnot, historian, and John Hadaway, Lieutenant of the Bellerophon during the Battle of the Nile which no longer exists (whose memorial no longer exists?). The poet and songwriter Robert Gilfillan lies just to the south-east of the church.

In the grounds of the graveyard are structures which contain memorials. The structures appear to have been roofed and to have had dividing walls and gates for each family's memorial. The gates, roof and walls are no longer present.

The interior of the church has memorials to:

- Very Rev Dr James Mitchell
- Very Rev Dr John White
- Sir Malcolm Smith
- William Lindsay (shipowner)
- James Reoch, Provost of Leith (monument by James Pittendrigh Macgillivray)

== Ministry ==
Note- from 1560 to 1839 the parish of Restalrig also worshipped in the church.

- Rev David Lindsay from 1560 to 1576
- David Lindsay (secundus) son of the above, from 1576 to 1627
- John Cranstoun from 1627 to 1629
- William Wishart of Pitarrow from 1630 to 1639
- James Sharpe from 1639 to 1647
- John Weir from 1647 to 1653
- John Hogg from 1653 to 1663
- John Hamilton of Blair from 1663 to 1682 (second charge Andrew Cant from 1671)
- James Waugh from 1682 to 1688
- William Wishart from 1688 to 1708 translated to Tron Kirk
- John Shaw from 1708 to 1740
- William Aitken from 1740 to 1765
- Thomas Scott from 1765 to 1790
- Robert Dickson DD from 1790 to 1824
- James Grant DD from 1824 to 1844, Moderator in 1854
- William Stevenson FRSE from 1844 to 1861
- Very Rev James Mitchell from 1864 to 1904 (Moderator in 1901)
- Very Rev John White from 1904 to 1911 (Moderator in 1929)
- William Swan from 1911 to 1927

=== Second Charge ===
Leith was important enough to warrant two ministers for most of its history: Important second charge ministers include:

- John Durie 1570 to 1574 translated to St Giles Cathedral
- James Logan 1591 to 1593
- George Sempill 1593 to ?
- John Hall 1596 to 1598 translated to St Giles Cathedral
- Andrew Lamb 1600 to 1602
- John Moray 1603 to 1608
- David Lindsay (secundus) 1609 to 1613 moved to first charge
- Thomas Hog 1616 to 1618
- John Cranstoun 1620 to 1624
- James Fairlie 1625 to 1630 became Professor of Divinity at Edinburgh University
- William Morton (or Myreton) 1631 to 1639 fled to Yorkshire
- Alexander Gibson 1640 to 1650 moved to Dunblane
- George Kintore 1657 to 1663
- John Cossar (or Corsawr) 1664 to 1669 translated to Dalgety
- Andrew Cant 1671 to 1679 translated to Trinity College Church
- Charles Kay 1681 to 1694 from St Cuthbert's
- John Gilchrist 1695 to 1697
- James Dickson 1700 to 1712
- William Brown 1712 to 1721 translated to Lady Yester's Church
- James Stevenson 1721 to 1745, moved to New Greyfriars
- Robert Walker 1746 to 1754 translated to St Giles Cathedral Moderator in 1771
- Alexander Stuart 1755 to 1762 translated to St Cuthberts
- Thomas Scott 1762 to 1765 moved to first charge
- Henry Hunter DD 1766 to 1771 translated to Scots Church in London
- John Logan the controversial poet and tragedian, 1771 to 1786.
- Robert Dickson 1787 to 1790 moved to first charge
- Thomas MacKnight 1791 to 1804 (Moderator in 1820)
- James Robertson DD 1804 to 1832
- David Thorburn 1833 to 1843
- At the time of the Disruption of 1843 David Thorburn (1805–1893) left to create the Free Church of South Leith, where he remained minister until death. South Leith Free Church stood on the west side of Leith Links on what is now Johns Place. It was demolished in 1905 to allow completion of the large warehouse which surrounded it (now converted to flats and known as the Ropeworks).
- Henry Duff 1844 to 1872

The requirement for a second charge ceased in 1878.

As of 2024 the charge is vacant. The most recent Minister was the Rev Iain May BSc MBA BD who was inducted into the charge on 18 April 2012. The former minister (1995–2011) was the Reverend Ian Y. Gilmour, who was previously minister at Drylaw Parish Church in Edinburgh. On 28 April 2011 Mr Gilmour became minister at St Andrew's and St George's West Church in the centre of Edinburgh.

In 2024, North Leith Parish Church united with South Leith Parish Church creating the current North & South Leith Parish Church (using the historic former South Leith Parish Church building).

== Congregational history ==
	Leith North Parish Church (1606-1968)							Leith North & Bonnington PC (1968-82)	Leith North PC (1982-2024)	Leith North & South Parish Church (2024-)
				Bonnington UPC (1876-1900)	Leith Bonnington UFC (1900-29)	Leith Bonnington PC (1929-68)		Leith North & Bonnington PC (1968-82)	Leith North PC (1982-2024)	Leith North & South Parish Church (2024-)
			Leith North FC (1843-1900)		Leith North Ferry Road UFC (1900-29)	Leith St Nicholas PC (1929-62)		Leith St Ninian's Ferry Road PC (1962-82)	Leith North PC (1982-2024)	Leith North & South Parish Church (2024-)
	North Leith Burgher Church (1817-20)	North Leith USC (1820-47)		North Leith UPC (1847-1900)	Leith North Coburg Street UFC (1900-29)	Leith Harper Memorial PC (1929-40)	Leith St Ninian's Coburg Street PC (1940-62)	Leith St Ninian's Ferry Road PC (1962-82)	Leith North PC (1982-2024)	Leith North & South Parish Church (2024-)
		Mariners' Chapel (1839-43)	Mariners' FC (1843-67)	St Ninian's FC (1867-1900)	Leith St Ninian's UFC (1900-29)	Leith St Ninian's PC (1929-40)	Leith St Ninian's Coburg Street PC (1940-62)	Leith St Ninian's Ferry Road PC (1962-82)	Leith North PC (1982-2024)	Leith North & South Parish Church (2024-)
Restalrig PC (APC-1609)	Leith South Parish Church (1609-1973)								Leith South Parish Church (1973-2024)	Leith North & South Parish Church (2024-)
	Kirkgate Burgher Church (1787-1820)	Kirkgate USC (1820-1846)		Kirkgate UPC (1848-1900)	Leith Kirkgate UFC (1900-29)	Leith Kirkgate Parish Church (1929-73)			Leith South Parish Church (1973-2024)	Leith North & South Parish Church (2024-)

== See also ==
- List of Church of Scotland parishes
- North Leith Parish Church
- Trinity House, Leith
