= Blind Pew (disambiguation) =

Blind Pew or Pew is a character in Treasure Island by Robert Louis Stevenson.

Blind Pew may also refer to:

- Blind Pew, the fourth hole at Spyglass Hill Golf Course
- "Blind Pew", a poem by Jorge Luis Borges in Dreamtigers
- "Blind Pew", a song by The Chieftains from the 1996 album Film Cuts
- Old Blind Pew, a character in the children's book The Queen of Paradise's Garden
