= James Grant (minister) =

Scottish minister

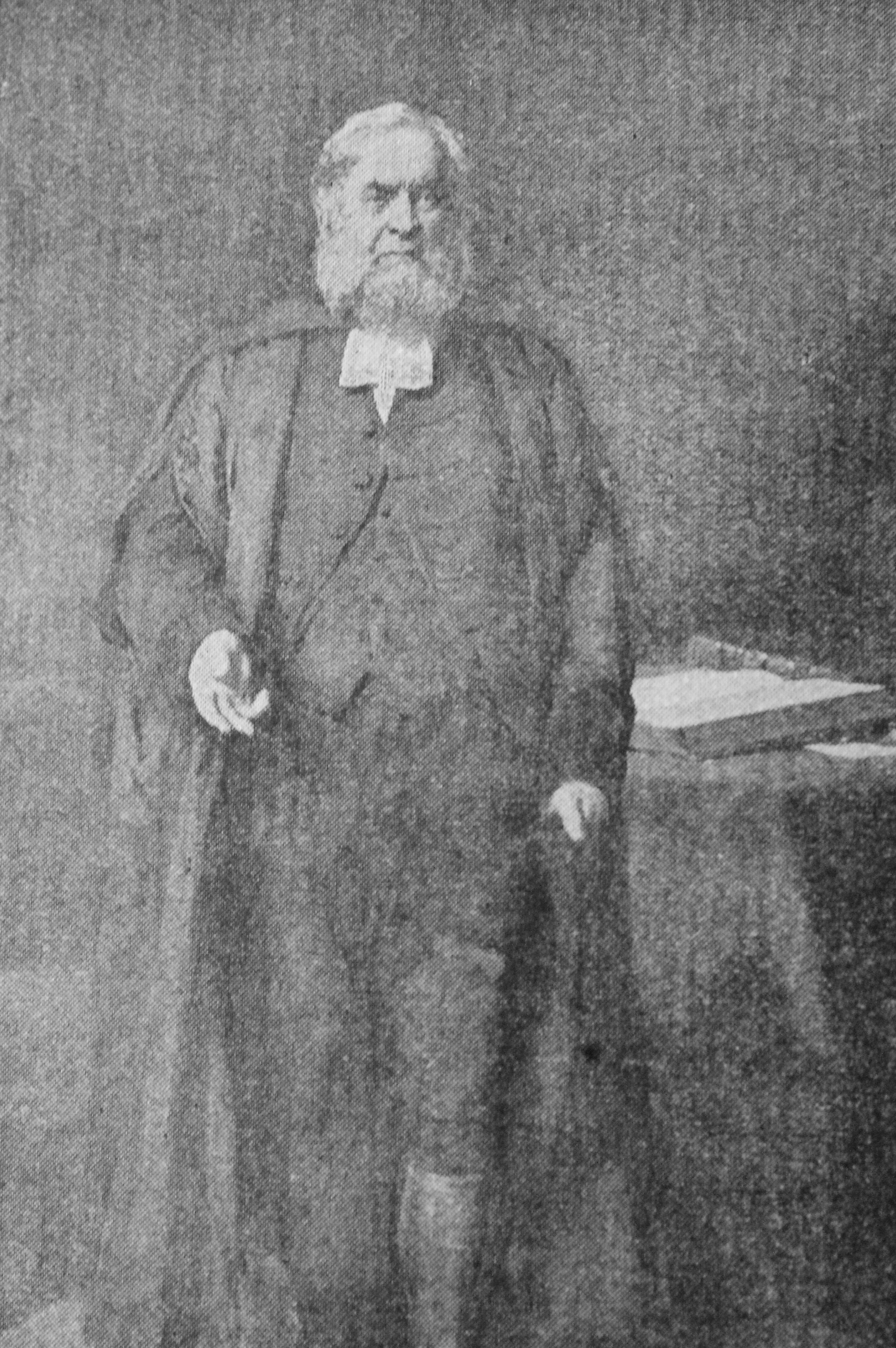
Rev James Grant

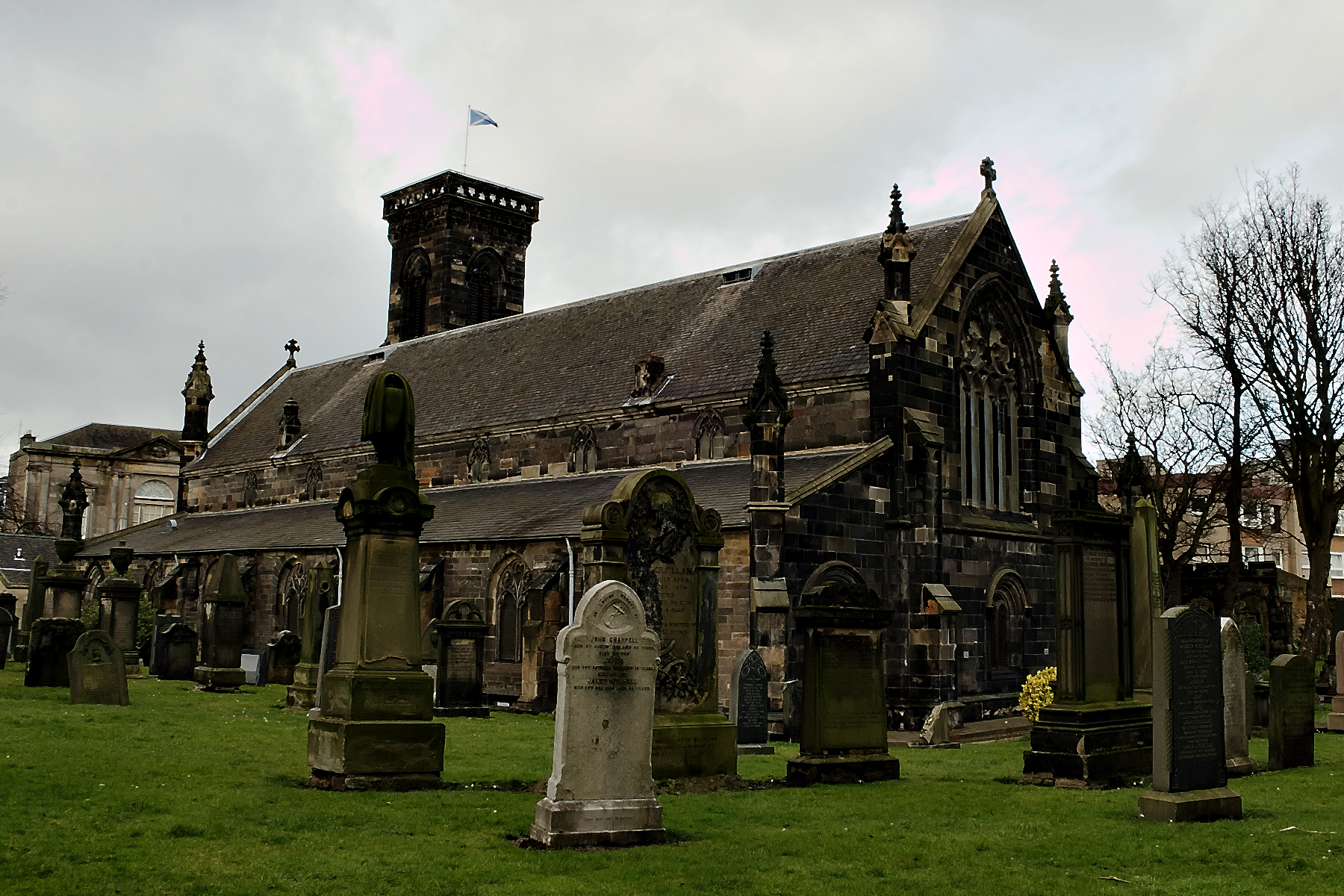
South Leith Parish Church

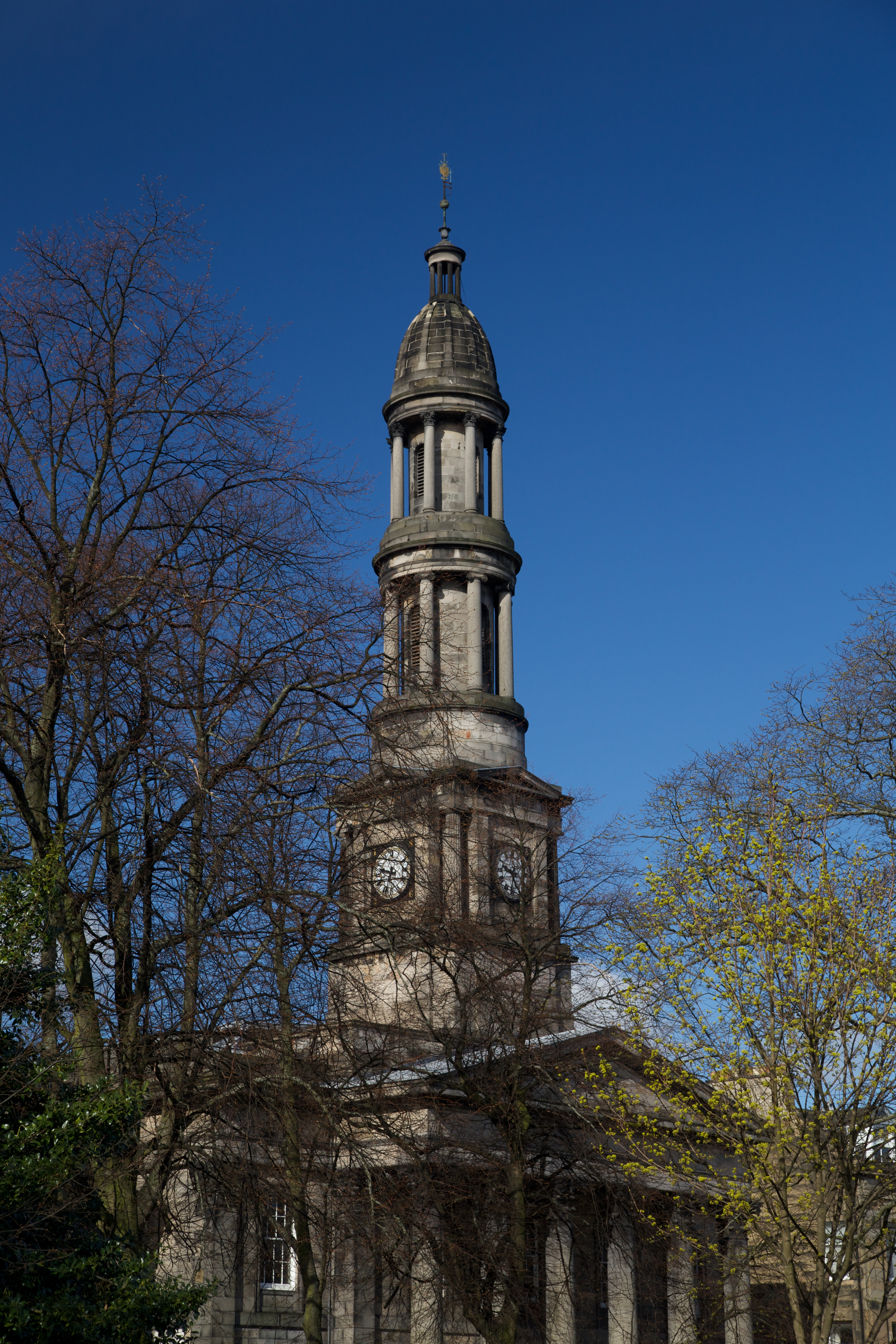
St Mary's, Bellevue in Edinburgh

James Grant (January 23, 1800 – July 28, 1890) was a Scottish minister. Combining his religious skills with business skills he was also Director of Scottish Widows for 50 years (1840 to 1890) and Moderator of the General Assembly of the Church of Scotland in 1854. During his period as Moderator he was styled as Right Rev James Grant and thereafter as Very Rev James Grant.

== Life ==
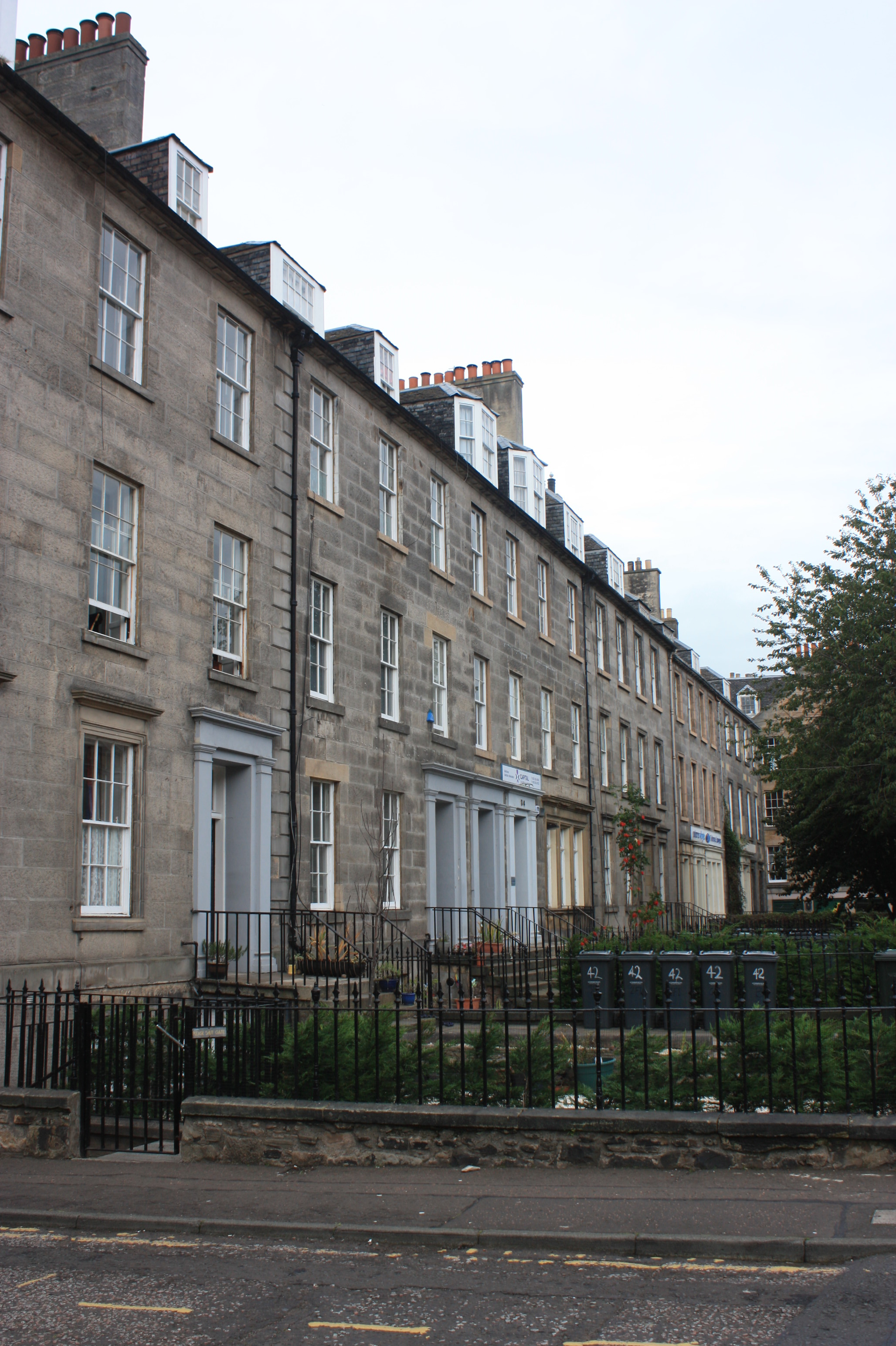
Cassels Place, Leith (now part of Leith Walk)

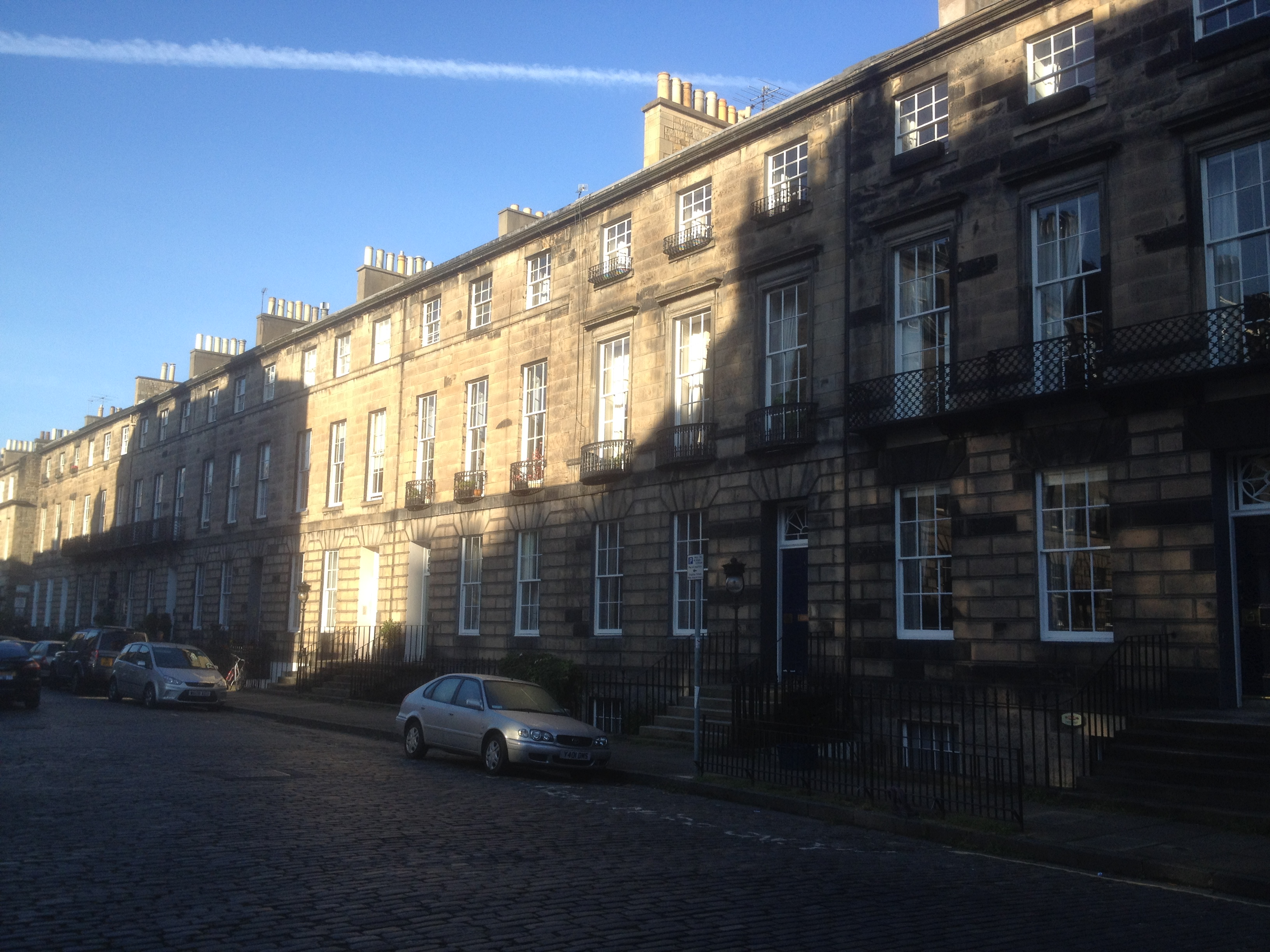
Northumberland Street, Edinburgh

He was born in the manse at Portmoak on the northern edge of Loch Leven on 23 January 1800, the son of Rev Andrew Grant, minister of Portmoak. He attended the High School in Edinburgh then studied divinity at the University of Edinburgh. He was licensed as a minister by the Presbytery of Edinburgh in February 1822. In August 1824 he was ordained as minister of South Leith Parish Church in the harbour area of Edinburgh, where he stayed until 1843.

The University of Glasgow awarded him an honorary doctorate (DD) in 1842. In 1843 he moved to St Mary's (Bellevue) Church in Edinburgh, in place of Rev Henry Grey who had left to join the Free Church in the Disruption of 1843. He stayed at Bellevue until retiral in 1871. During this period he was chosen as Moderator of the General Assembly of the Church of Scotland in 1854. The University of Oxford awarded him an honorary doctorate Doctor of Civil Laws (DCL) during his period as Moderator. He then lived at 11 Northumberland Street in Edinburgh's Second New Town.

From 1843 to 1860 he was Collector of the Ministers' Widows Fund and Director of the Scottish Widows Fund Assurance society from 1849 to 1890. From 1849 he was Caplain of the Highland and Agricultural Society of Scotland and Secretary of the Scottish Bible Society 1836 to 1874.

In 1851 he had been elected a Fellow of the Royal Society of Edinburgh, his proposer was John Russell. He was an honorary member of the Harveian Society of Edinburgh for 53 years.

He resigned in 1871 and was replaced at St Mary's Bellevue by Rev Cornelius Giffen.

He died on 28 July 1890. He is buried in Warriston Cemetery with his wife. Their son is buried alongside.

== Family ==
In April 1826 he married Jessie Anne Campbell (d.1881) youngest daughter of Colin Campbell of Achindoon in Argyleshire, and widow of Major Archibald Campbell of Braglen. They originally set up home at 3 Cassels Place in Leith, the harbour district of Edinburgh. The house forms part of the Georgian terrace at the foot of Leith Walk. Their children included:

- Agnes Willis Grant (1828-1855)
- Andrew Grant (1830–1924)
- Colin Campbell Grant WS (1830-1902) twin of Andrew.
- Captain James Grant RN (1833-1909)
- George Grant (1834-1848)
- Margaret Campbell Grant (1836-1906)
- Archibald Duncan Grant HEICS (b.1839)

== Other roles of note ==
- Honorary Chaplain of the Highland Society (1828)
- Chaplain of the Highland and Agricultural Society (1840–1890)
- Honorary Chaplain (Pontifex Maximus) of the Harveian Society of Edinburgh (1844–1890)
