= Henry Hunter (divine) =

Scottish minister (1741–1802)

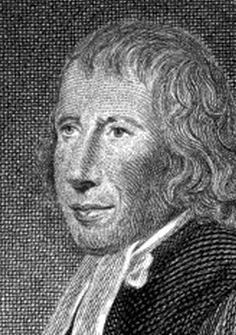
Henry Hunter, engraved by Thomas Holloway after Stevenson.

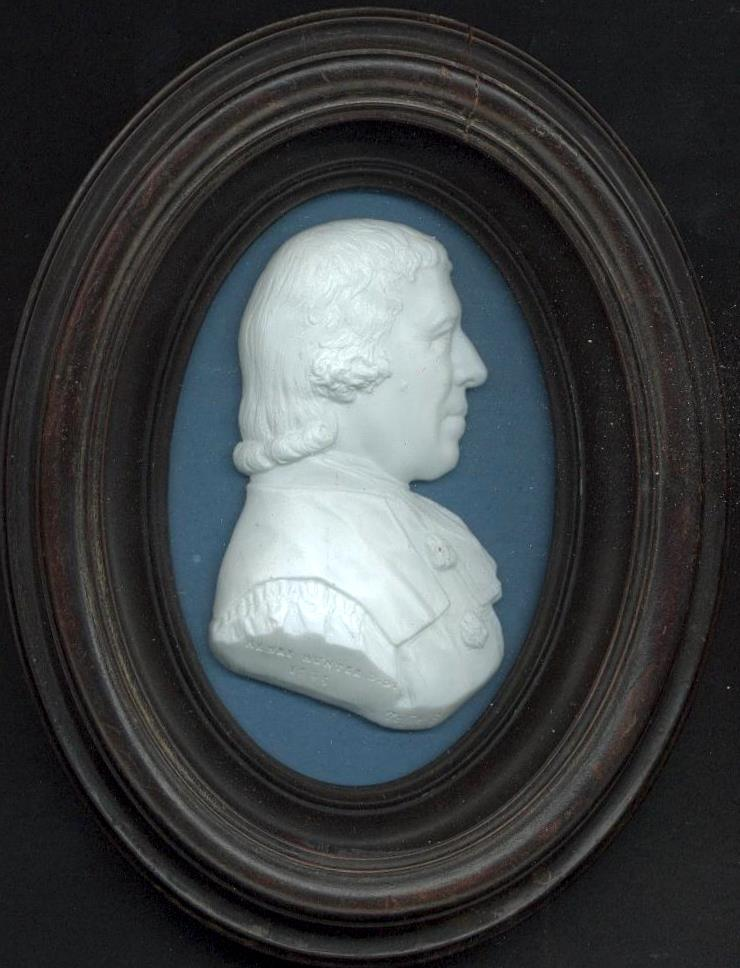
A medallion of Hunter by James Tassie.

Henry Hunter (25 August 1741 – 27 October 1802) was a Scottish minister who translated the works of noted scholars including Leonard Euler and Johann Kaspar Lavater.

== Life ==
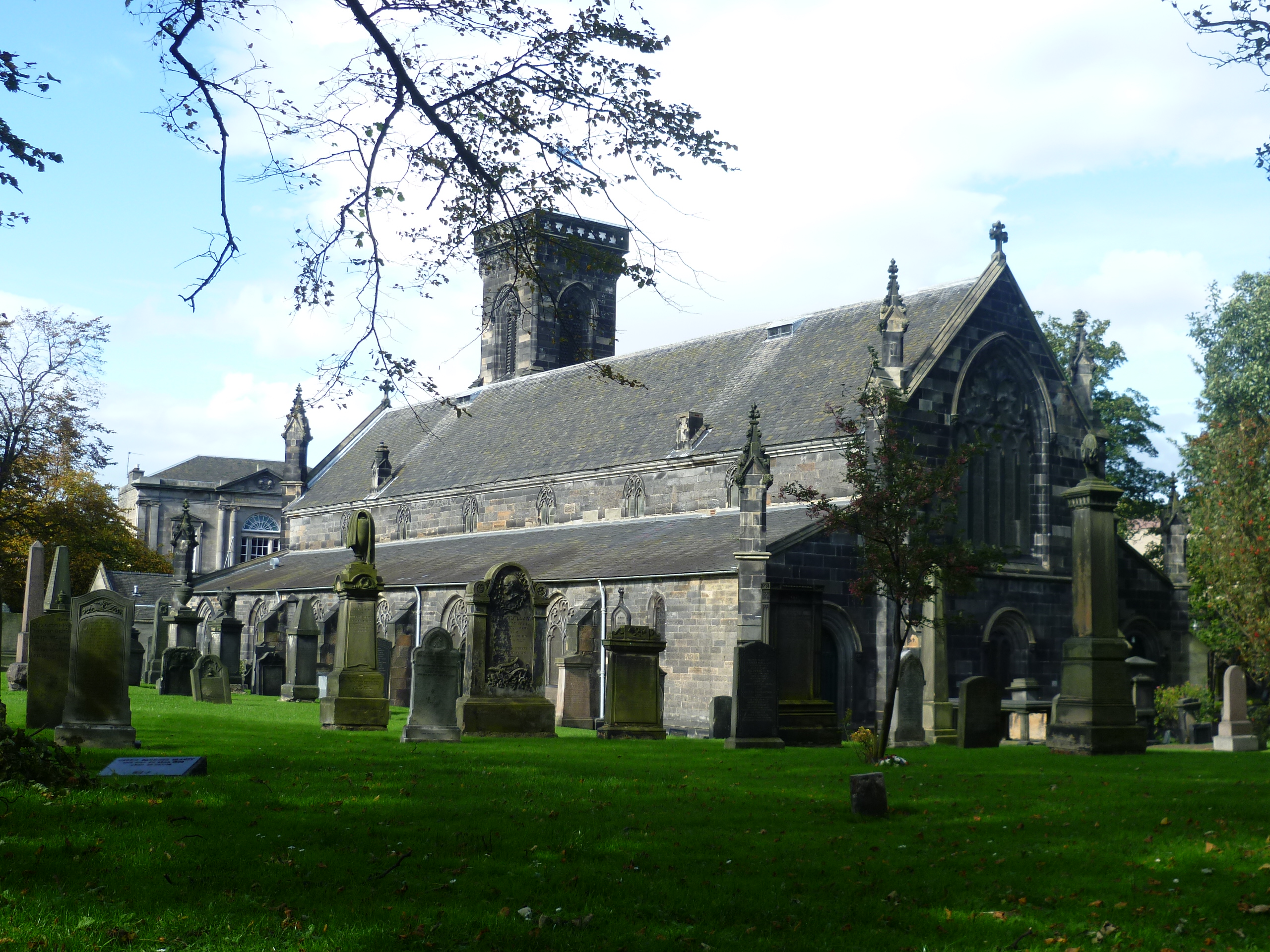
South Leith Parish Church

Henry Hunter was born at Culross on the Firth of Forth, on 25 August 1741. He was the fifth child of David and Agnes Hunter. In 1754 he was sent to the University of Edinburgh at the age of 13. He became tutor to Claud Irvine Boswell, Lord Balmuto whom he befriended at university.

Hunter then became the family tutor to Alexander, Earl of Dundonald at Culross Abbey. In 1764 he received licence to preach from the presbytery of Dunfermline and he became the "second charge" minister of the important South Leith Parish Church near Edinburgh in January 1766, with his predecessor Rev Thomas Scott rising to "first charge".

In 1769 he preached in London and although invited to lead a Scottish congregation in Piccadilly he finally accepted an invitation from the Scots Church at London Wall in August 1771. Soon after this move, Edinburgh University awarded him an honorary degree as Doctor of Divinity.

Hunter visited Johann Kaspar Lavater in Zurich in August 1787 and secure Lavater's agreement to the publication of an English version of his Essays on Physiognomy. Lavater was initially cool to the idea, but was persuaded by Hunter's skill in his language. The book was well received in England and Hunter was then tempted to try a translation from German of a work on electricity by Leonard Euler.

Hunter was chaplain to the Scots Corporation in London, and in August 1790 he was elected correspondence secretary to the Society in Scotland for Propagating Christian Knowledge in the Highlands and Islands of Scotland.

In 1797, John Fell had been tasked with delivering twelve lectures of the evidence for Christianity. When Fell died after delivering only four of the lectures, the job was given to Hunter who completed the task and later published the lectures as a book.

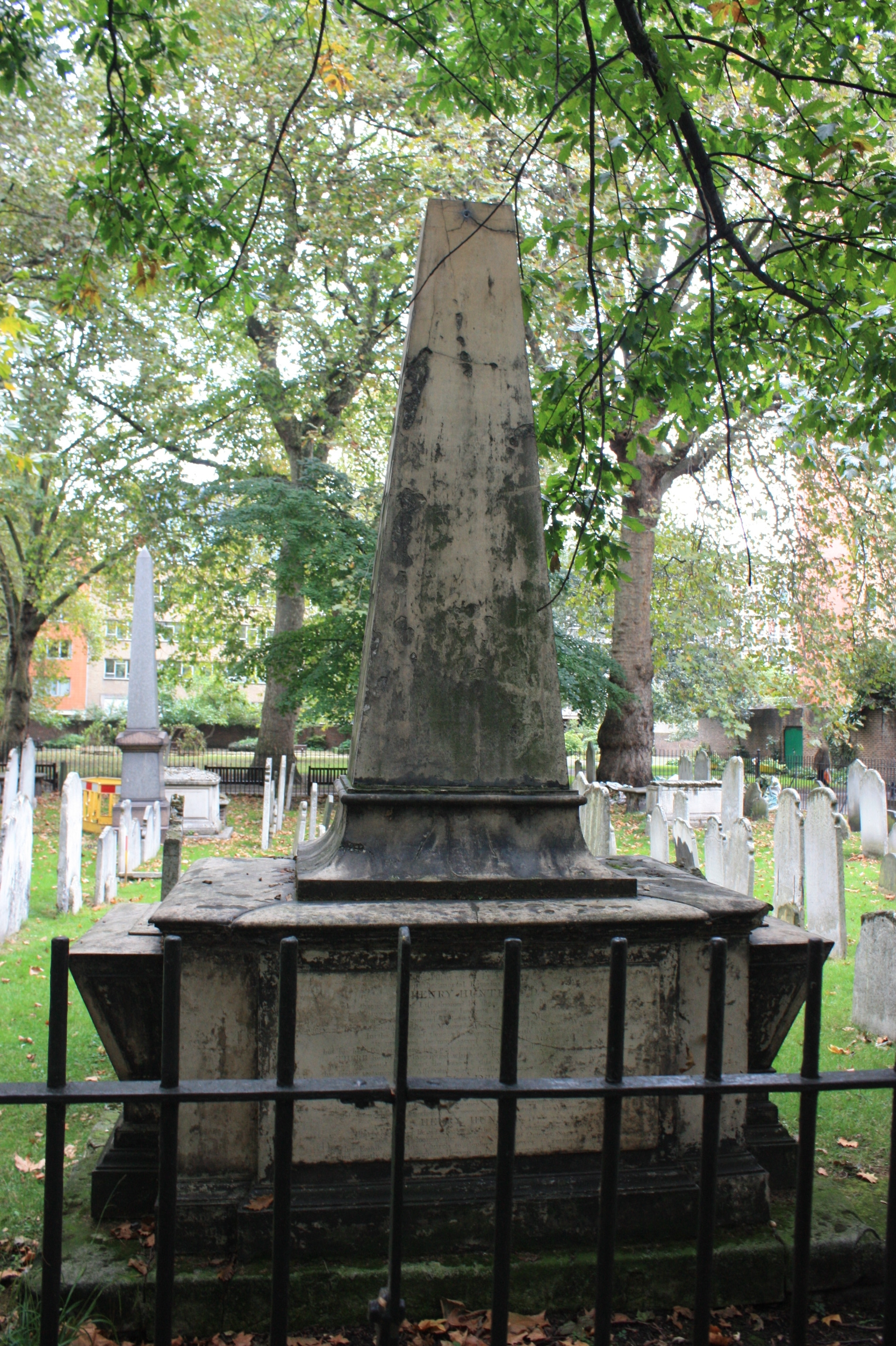
The grave of Henry Hunter, Bunhill Fields, London

He died in Bristol on 27 October 1802 and was buried in the non-conformist cemetery at Bunhill Fields in London. The grave lies just to the side of the main path and is of distinctive form.

== Family ==
In May 1766, he married Margaret Charters, the daughter of Rev Thomas Charters, the minister of Inverkeithing. They had only two sons and a daughter who survived them, as Hunter's final years saw the deaths of four of his children.

== Works ==
- Hunter's Sacred Biography, A Course of Lectures on the Principal Characters Mentioned in the Old Testament; and On the Principal Events in the Life of Christ. First Publication 1791 in multiple volumes. There have been numerous editions and edits to the current day.
- Sermons 1795, 2 vols.
- Sermons and other Miscellaneous Pieces, 1804
- A Brief History of the Society for Propagating Christian Knowledge 2 vols. 1795
- A History of London and its Environs 1796
- Sacred Biography 6 vols. 1783 to 1792

=== Translations ===
- 'Lavater's Essays on Physiognomy,' 1789–98, illustrated with more than eight hundred engravings managed by Thomas Holloway. (The original cost price of each copy was 30 pounds.)
- Euler's "Letters to a German Princess on different subjects in Physics and Philosophy," 1795, with notes by Sir David Brewster.
- Bernardin de St. Pierre's Studies of Nature and Botanical Harmony, 1796-7.
- Sonnini de Manoncourt's Travels to Upper and Lower Egypt, 1799
- Rev. James Saurin's Sermons, 1800-6, 7 vols. 8vo.
- J.H.Castéra's History of Catharine II, 1800.
