= Thomas MacKnight (minister) =

Scottish minister (1762–1836)

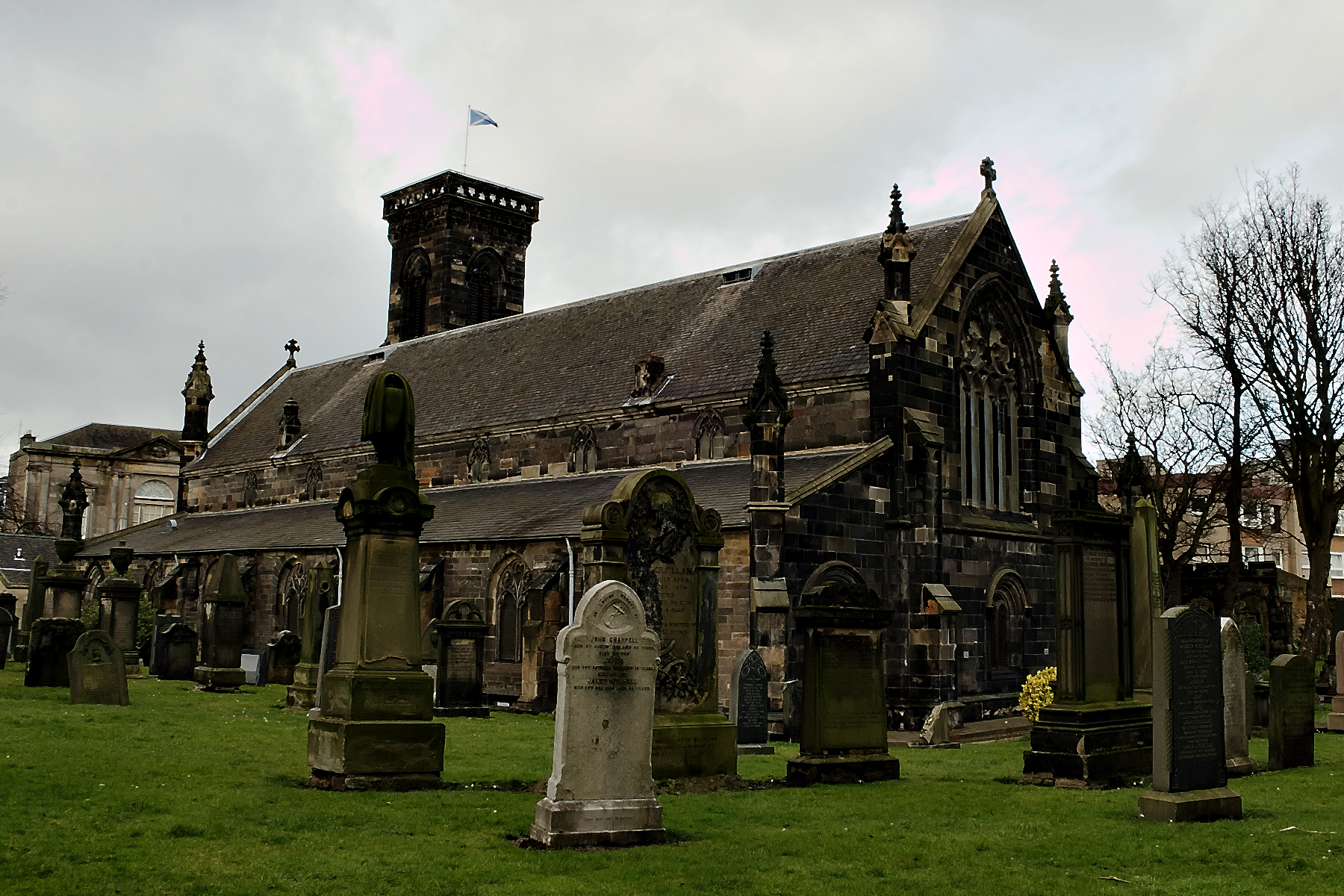
South Leith Parish Church

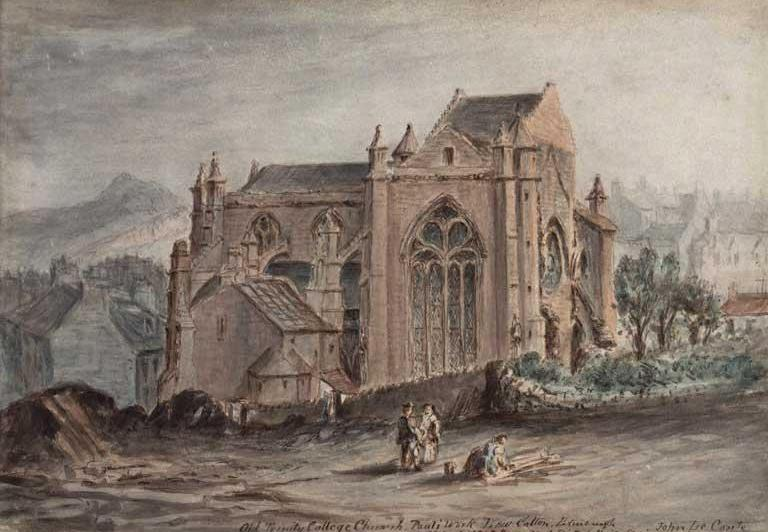
Watercolour from the early 1840s depicting Trinity College Church

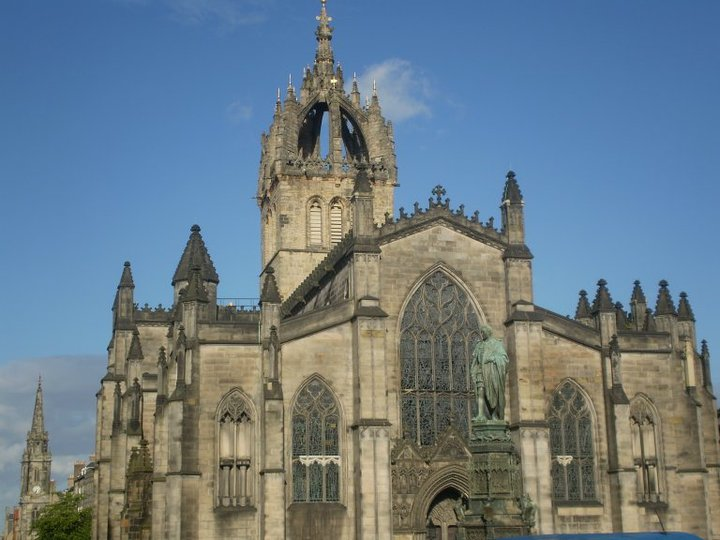
Old Kirk of St Giles (St Giles Cathedral)

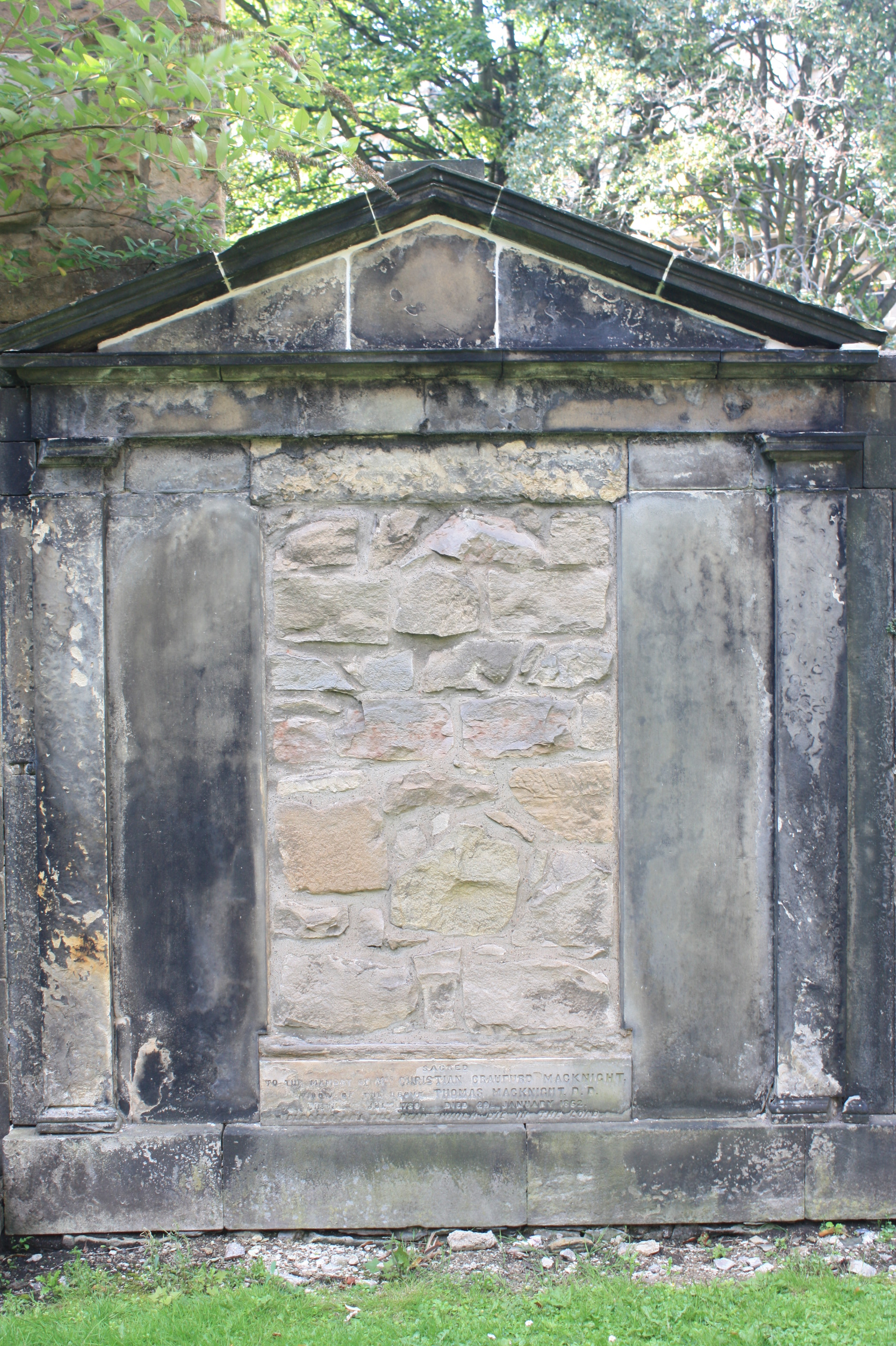
The grave of Very Rev Thomas MacKnight, St Cuthberts Churchyard, Edinburgh

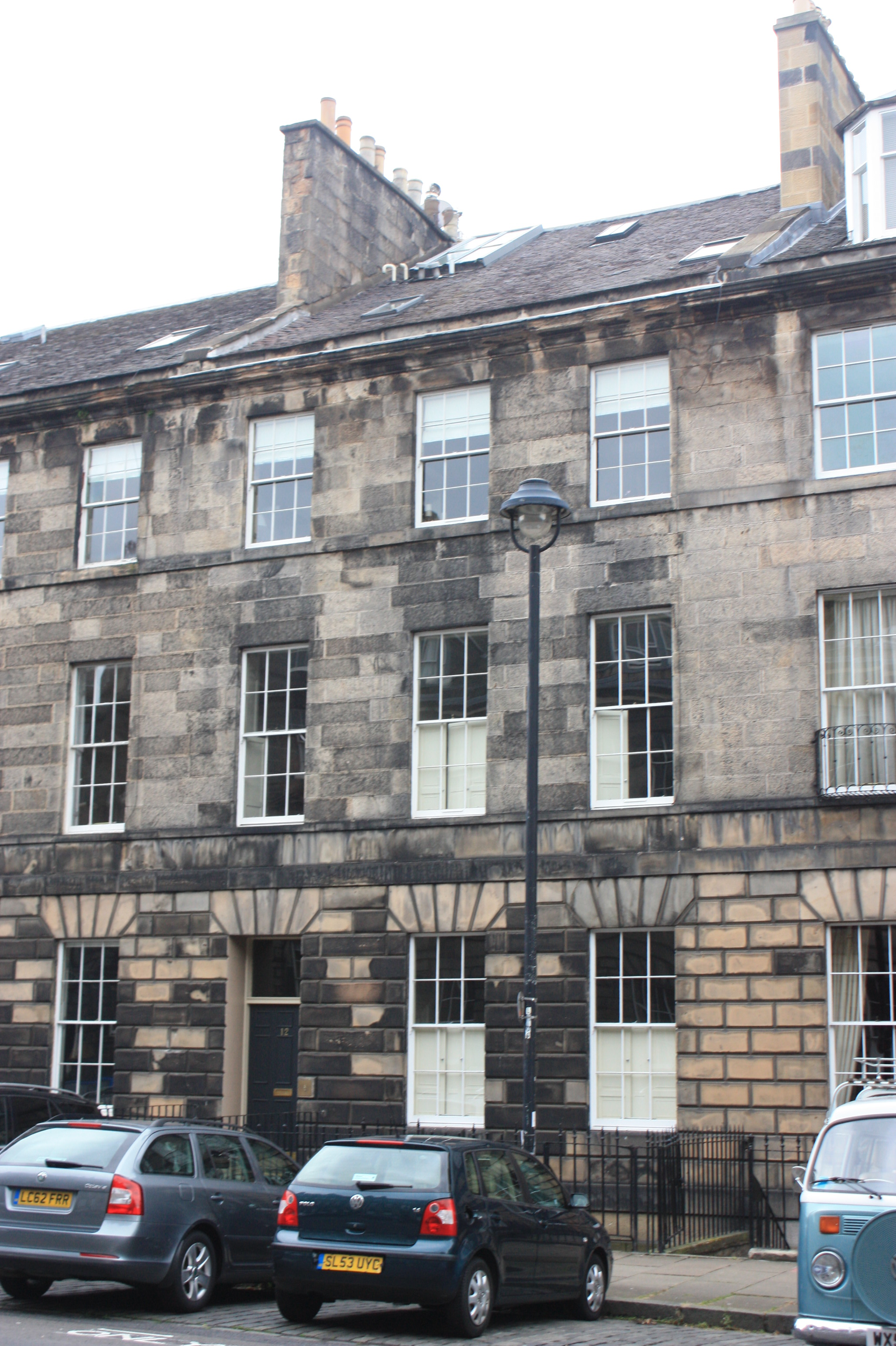
12 London Street, Edinburgh

Thomas MacKnight FRSE FSA MWS (1762–1836) was a Scottish minister based in Edinburgh who was Moderator of the General Assembly of the Church of Scotland in 1820. He is also remembered as a gifted physicist, mathematician and geologist.

== Life ==
He was born on 15 August 1762 in Edinburgh, the fourth son of Elizabeth McCormick and Rev Dr James MacKnight DD (1721–1800), minister of the Old Kirk of St Giles. His parents were originally from Irvine. His father served as Moderator of the General Assembly of the Church of Scotland in 1769. Thomas was educated at the High School in Edinburgh 1772–74 then studied divinity at the University of Edinburgh.

He was licensed to preach by the Presbytery of Edinburgh in April 1788 and in February 1791 took over South Leith Parish Church in the harbour area of Edinburgh. In 1804 he translated to Trinity College Kirk sitting between the Old Town and New Town. The church was demolished 30 years after he left to allow the building of Waverley Station. In 1810 he moved his final move to the Old Kirk of St Giles.

He was elected a Fellow of the Royal Society of Edinburgh in 1799. His proposers were John Playfair, Andrew Dalzell, and James Bonar. The University of Edinburgh awarded him an honorary doctorate (DD) in 1808.

In January 1805, following the death of Professor John Robison, he filled the chair as professor of natural philosophy (physics) on an informal basis until a replacement was found. When John Playfair filled this role, he applied for Playfair's previous post as professor of mathematics but lost to John Leslie. This all indicates his eminence as a mathematician and physicist. He had stated that he would leave the church if given the chair, but it was still an issue of great debate in both the university and the church at the time.

In 1820 he lived at 12 London Street, a large mid-terraced Georgian townhouse in Edinburgh's New Town

He died in Edinburgh on 12 January 1836. He is buried against a main dividing wall in St Cuthberts Churchyard at the west end of Princes Street in Edinburgh. He lies to the right of his parents immediately north of the church. The original marble slab is lost, and his name only remains on the base of the monument.

== Publications ==
- The Means of National Security Considered as a Ground of Thankfulness to Divine Providence (1795)
- The Life of James MacKnight (c.1810)
- Mineralogical Notices and Observations (1817)
- New Literal Translation of the Apostolic Epistles (1821)

== Family ==
In April 1808 he was married to his cousin Christian Crauford MacKnight (1780–1862) daughter of Thomas MacKnight of Ratho. Their children included Dr Thomas MacKnight MD, James MacKnight WS (1810–1878) and Alexander Edward MacKnight, advocate (1817–1899).
