= James MacKnight =

Scottish minister and theological author

James Macknight
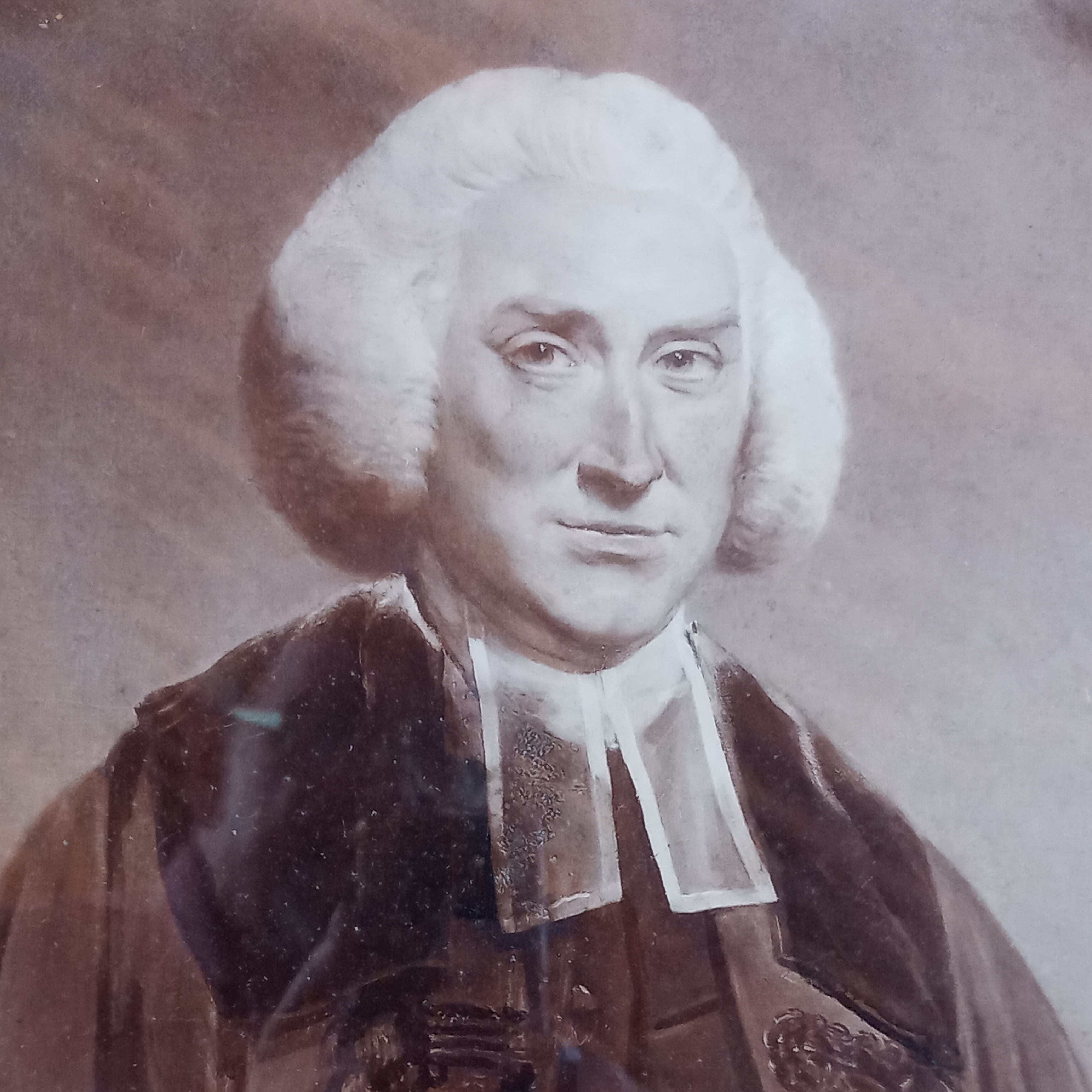
- Born: 1721
- Died: 1800 (aged 78–79)
- Occupation: Church minister
- Known for: Moderator of the General Assembly of the Church of Scotland in 1769.

James MacKnight (1721-1800) was a Scottish minister and theological author, serving at the Old Kirk of Edinburgh (St Giles Cathedral). He is remembered for his book Harmony of the Gospels and as Moderator of the General Assembly of the Church of Scotland in 1769.

== Life ==
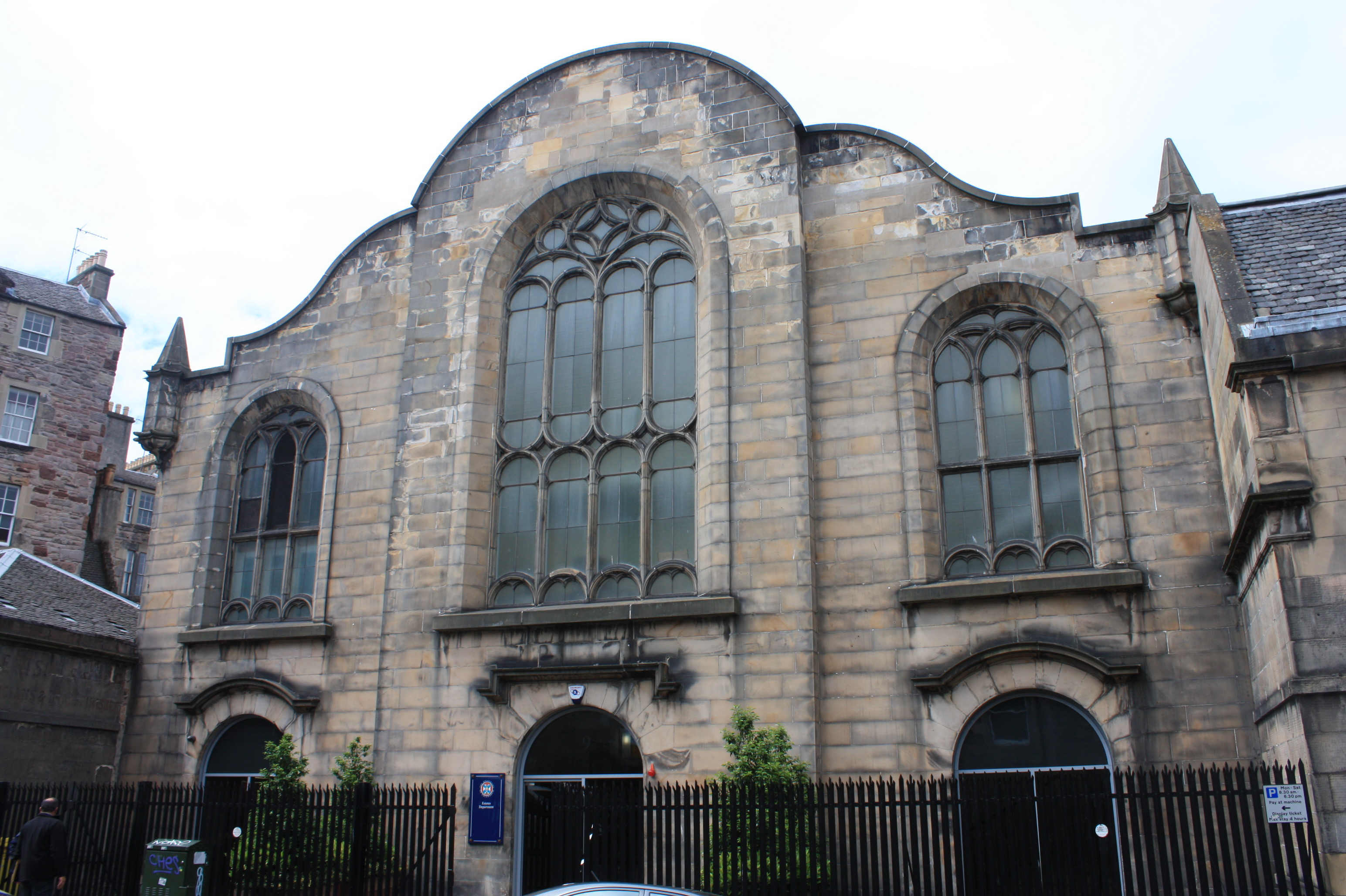
The church building on Infirmary Street.

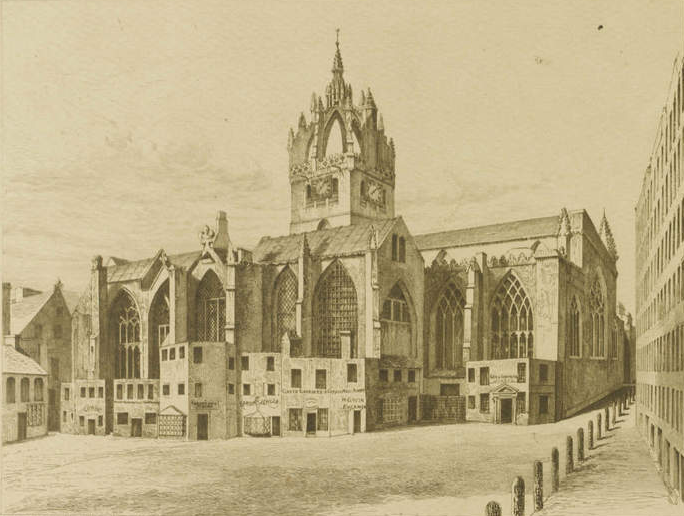
St Giles in the 18th century

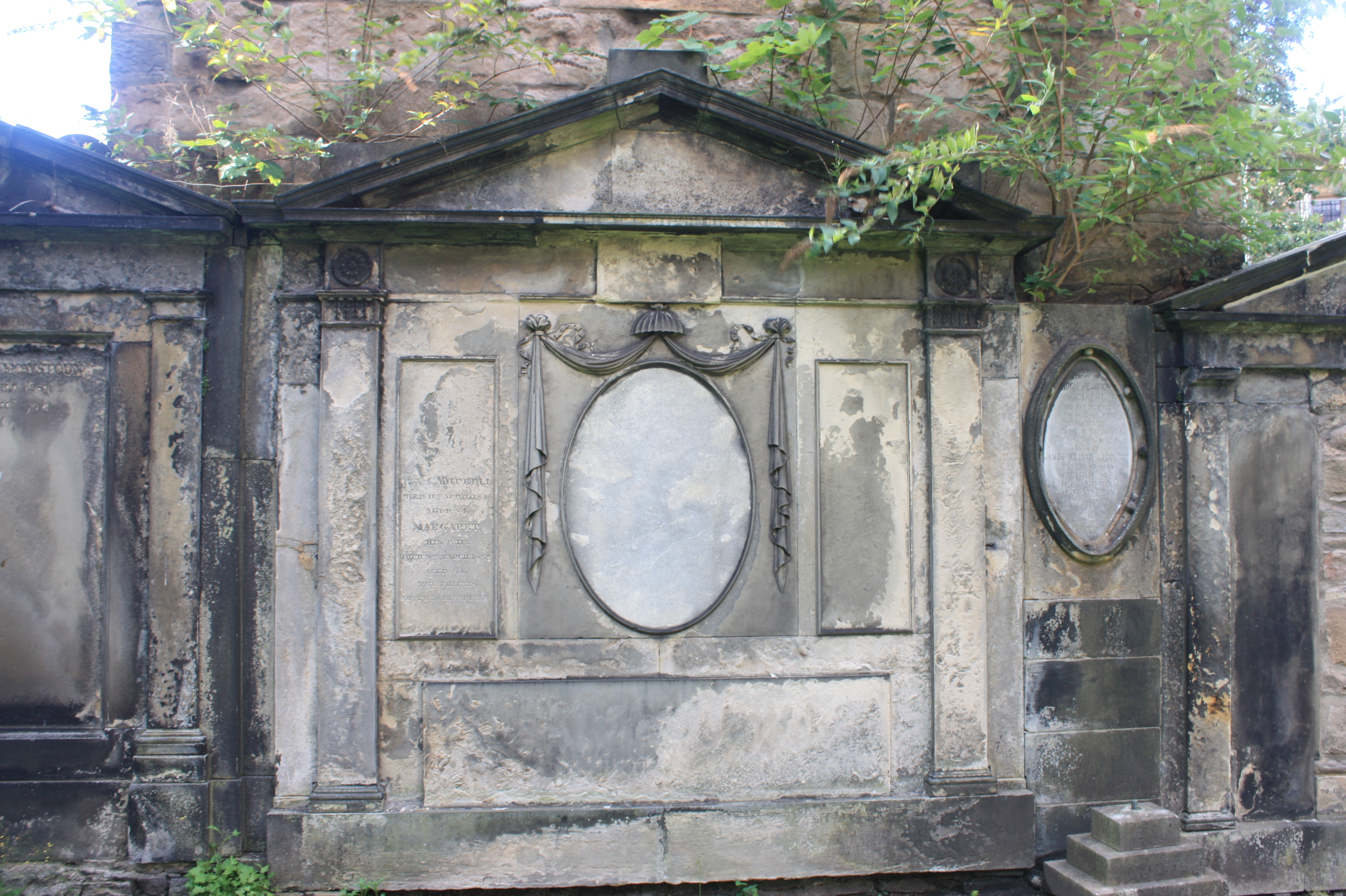
The grave of Very Rev James MacKnight, St Cuthberts Churchyard, Edinburgh

He was born on 17 September 1721 in the manse in Irvine in Ayrshire the son of Elizabeth Gemmill of Dalraith (d.1753) and her husband, Rev William Mackneight (sic) (d. 1750), the parish minister. He was the third of seven children. The family appear to have originally been called McNaughtane or McNaughton, and came from the Scottish Highlands via Ireland.

He was educated in Irvine then received a theological bursary from the Exchequer and studied theology at the University of Glasgow from 1735 and graduating in 1743 before travelling to Europe to undertake further studies at the University of Leyden, a recognised centre for theological study. Around 1745, having been licensed to preach as a minister of the Church of scotland by the Presbytery of Irvine, he became an assistant at the Chapel of Ease in the Gorbals in south Glasgow. A few years later he assisted the Rev Alexander Ferguson in Kilwinning Church before finally in 1753 receiving his own church, at Maybole not far from his home town of Irvine.

In 1759 the University of Edinburgh awarded him an honorary doctorate (DD). In 1769 he was translated from Maybole to Jedburgh Old Parish Church in the Scottish Borders on 30 November. In the same year he was elected Moderator of the General Assembly. In November 1771 he was translated again, to Lady Yester's Kirk in Edinburgh. In 1778 he made his final move, to the Old Kirk of Edinburgh, one of the four parishes contained in St Giles Cathedral. During this period he befriended the Rev Robert Henry.

In 1784 he became joint collector of the Ministers' Widows' Fund.

He died at home at 11 Nicolson Street in Edinburgh on 13 January 1800. As St Giles lacks a graveyard he is buried in St Cuthbert's Churchyard at the west end of Princes Street. The grave lies on a main dividing wall to the north of the church. The main central marble tablet is highly eroded and reference to him is now only visible on the side tablets. The graves of his family surround him.

== Publications ==
- A Harmony of the Four Gospels (1756) (revised 1763)
- The Truth of the Gospel History (1763)
- The Epistle to the Thessalonians (1787)
- The Epistles of St Paul (1787)
- A New Literal Translation from the Original Greek, of All the Apostolical Epistles (in six volumes)
- The Sacred Writings of the Apostles and Evangelists of Jesus Christ: Commonly Styled the New Testament

== Family ==
In April 1754 he married Elizabeth McCormick (1728-1813), daughter of Samuel McCormick, General Examiner of Excise in Edinburgh.

They had four sons:

- Samuel MacKnight WS (1757-1807)
- James MacKnight (1759-1793)
- Thomas MacKnight (1762-1836) who was also a minister and rose to the highest level in the Church of Scotland as Moderator of the General Assembly in 1820. His son later wrote his biography.
