= Thomas Holloway (painter) =

English painter

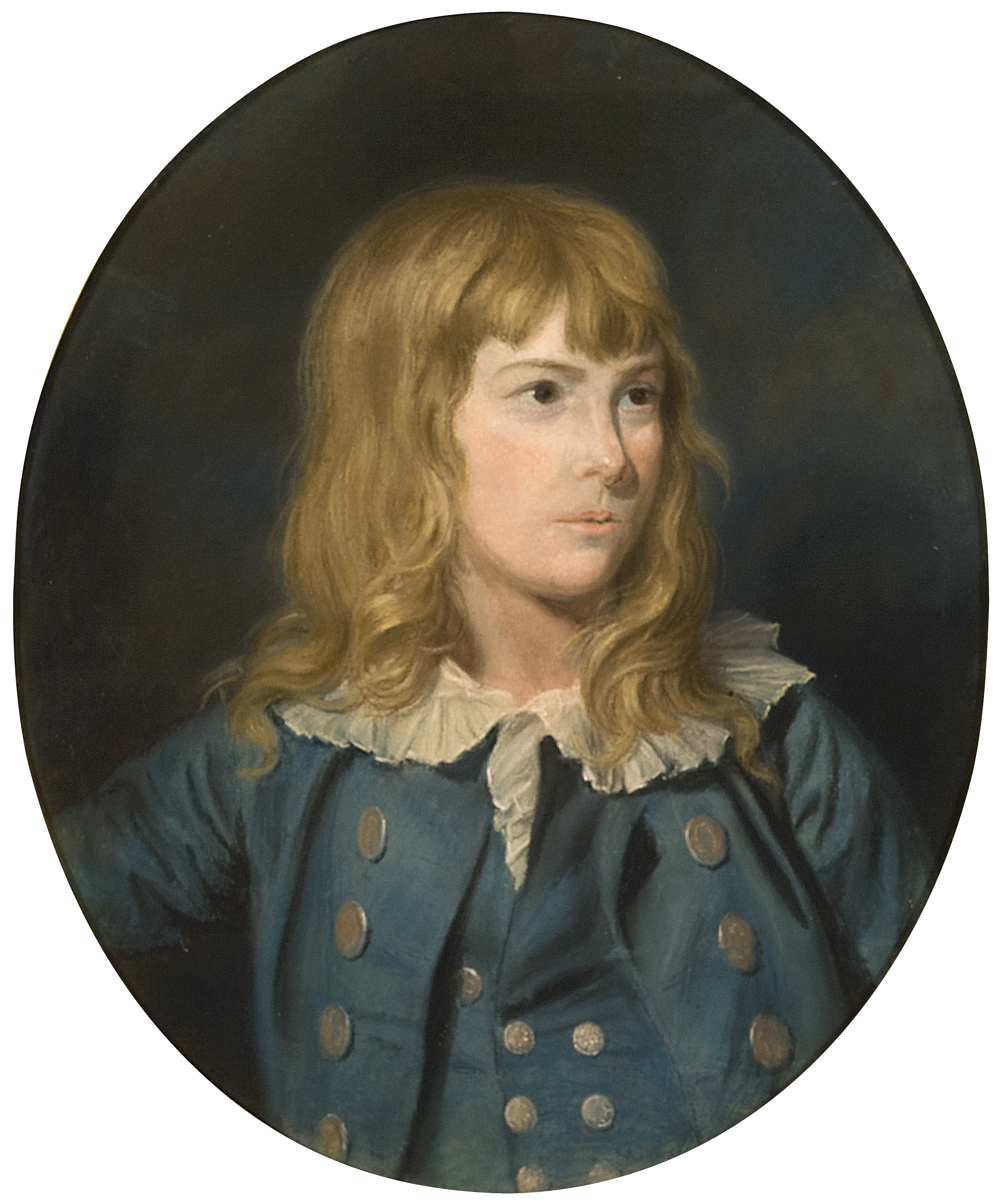
Portrait of a boy by Thomas Holloway, probably his nephew, in pastels.

Thomas Holloway (1748 Broad Street, London – 28 February 1827 Coltishall) was an English portrait painter and engraver.

Holloway was apprenticed to a seal engraver named Stent at a young age. He went on to study engraving at the Royal Academy beginning in 1773, during which time he resided at 11 Beaches Row, near Charles Square, Hoxton, and exhibited pastel portraits at the Society of Artists in 1777. He later lived in Orme House in Hampton, Edgefield, Norfolk, and Coltishall, Norfolk. He became a court engraver in 1792.

== Life ==
Born in Broad Street, London, he was eldest son of a merchant who was an early follower of John Wesley; his mother's portrait was painted by John Russell. He was articled to a seal-engraver named Stent, by whom he was mainly employed in carving steel ornaments. He subsequently attended the Royal Academy schools, and in 1773 first appeared at the Royal Academy as an exhibitor of seals and engraved gems. Later and up to 1792 he was a contributor of miniatures and portraits in oils and crayons.

Holloway was a Baptist. He died unmarried at Coltishall, near Norwich, 29 February 1827, in his 80th year.

== Works ==
Holloway's main direction was line engraving. His earliest published plates were small portraits for magazines, chiefly of nonconformist ministers. He later undertook an edition of Johann Kaspar Lavater's Essays on Physiognomy, translated by Henry Hunter, 5 vols., 1789–98. The work was illustrated with about 800 plates executed by Holloway himself, Francesco Bartolozzi, William Blake, and other engravers, under the direction of Henry Fuseli.

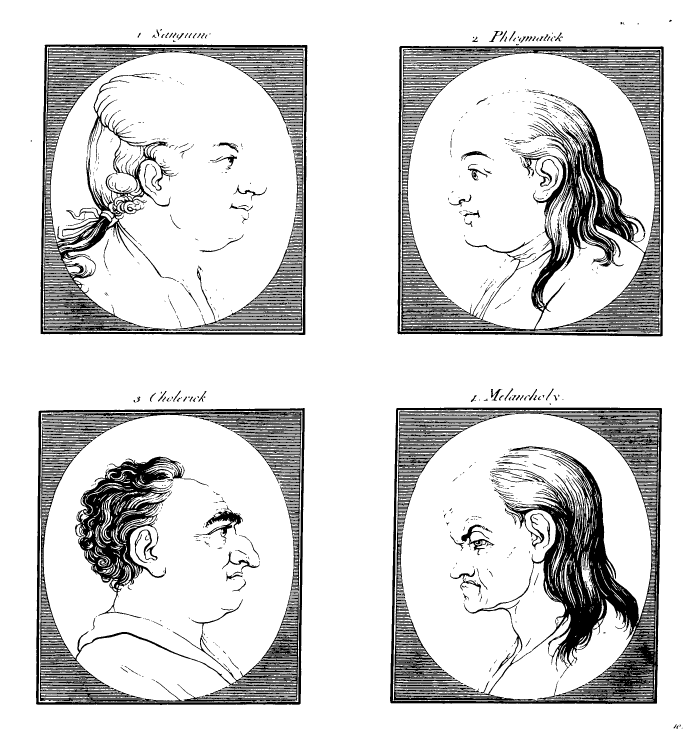
Thomas Holloway, illustration for Lavater's Essays on Physiognomy.

His portraits included those of Charles Howard, 11th Duke of Norfolk, after Robert Edge Pine, and of Timothy Priestley, 1792, and Richard Price, after Benjamin West, 1793. He was also employed on the illustrations to John Boydell's Shakespeare, Robert Bowyer's History of England, and Bell's British Theatre.

=== The Raphael Cartoons ===
Holloway is noted for his arduous engravings of cartoons by Raphael at Windsor Castle in 1800, on which he worked for 30 years. This ambitious project was a financial failure. The cartoons had already been engraved by Nicolas Dorigny.

Through the influence of Benjamin West, Holloway obtained permission to engrave on a large scale the seven Raphael Cartoons at Windsor, and to this task the remainder of his life was devoted. He engaged as assistants his former pupils, R. Slann and T. S. Webb, each of whom married a niece of Holloway, together with Joseph Thomson, an artist who died young. They worked together at Windsor until 1814, when the cartoons were moved to Hampton Court.

On the completion of the first plate, Paul preaching at Athens, in 1806, the king appointed Holloway his historical engraver; the second, Christ's Charge to Peter, appeared in 1810; the third, The Death of Ananias, in 1816; and the fourth, Elymas, in 1820. In that year all the preliminary drawings were finished, and Holloway retired with his associates to Edgefield in Norfolk, and later to Coltishall, near Norwich, to pursue their work on the plates, of which the fifth, The Miraculous Draught of Fishes, was issued in 1824. This was the last that Holloway lived to complete.

The sixth plate, Paul and Barnabas at Lystra, was almost finished in 1827, and the seventh, Peter and John at the Beautiful Gate, begun. The former appeared in the following year, 1828, but the completion of the latter was delayed until 1839, when it was published with a dedication to the Queen, and like the rest bore the names of Holloway, Slann, and Webb as the engravers and publishers.

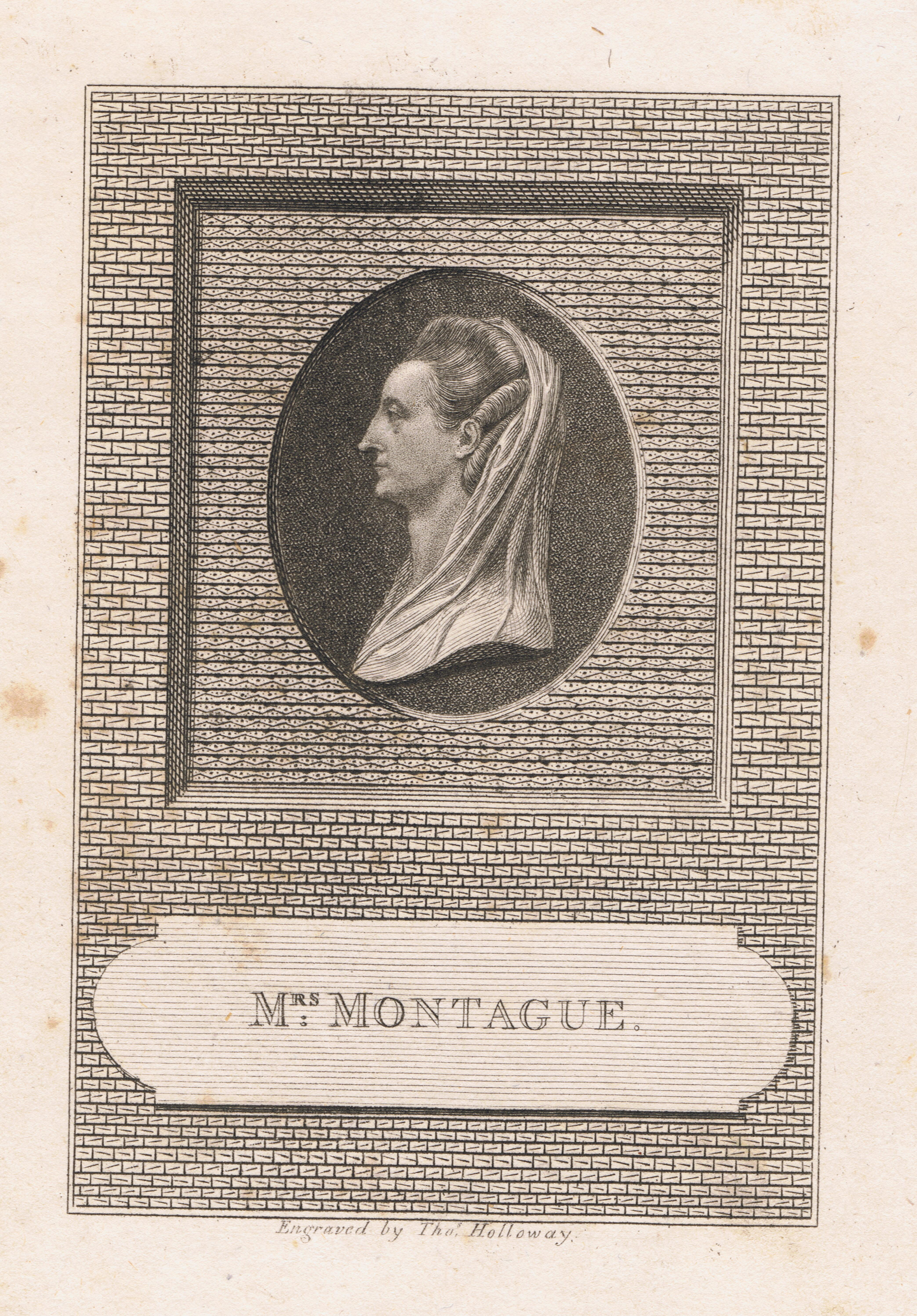
Mrs. Elizabeth Montague, engraved by Thomas Holloway, published by John Sewell (died 1802), 32 Cornhill, London, 1785.

== Family ==
Holloway executed crayon portraits of himself and of his nephew, a naval captain. His brother John Holloway was at one time a popular lecturer on animal magnetism; Thomas at one point lectured on his brother's behalf on the theory.
