= Claud Irvine Boswell, Lord Balmuto =

Scottish judge

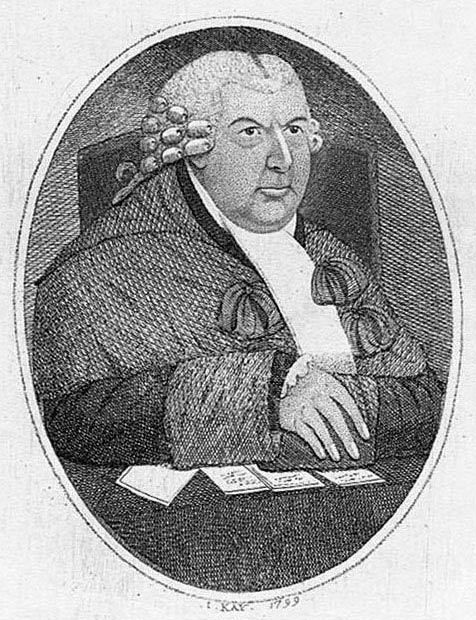
Lord Balmuto by John Kay, 1799.

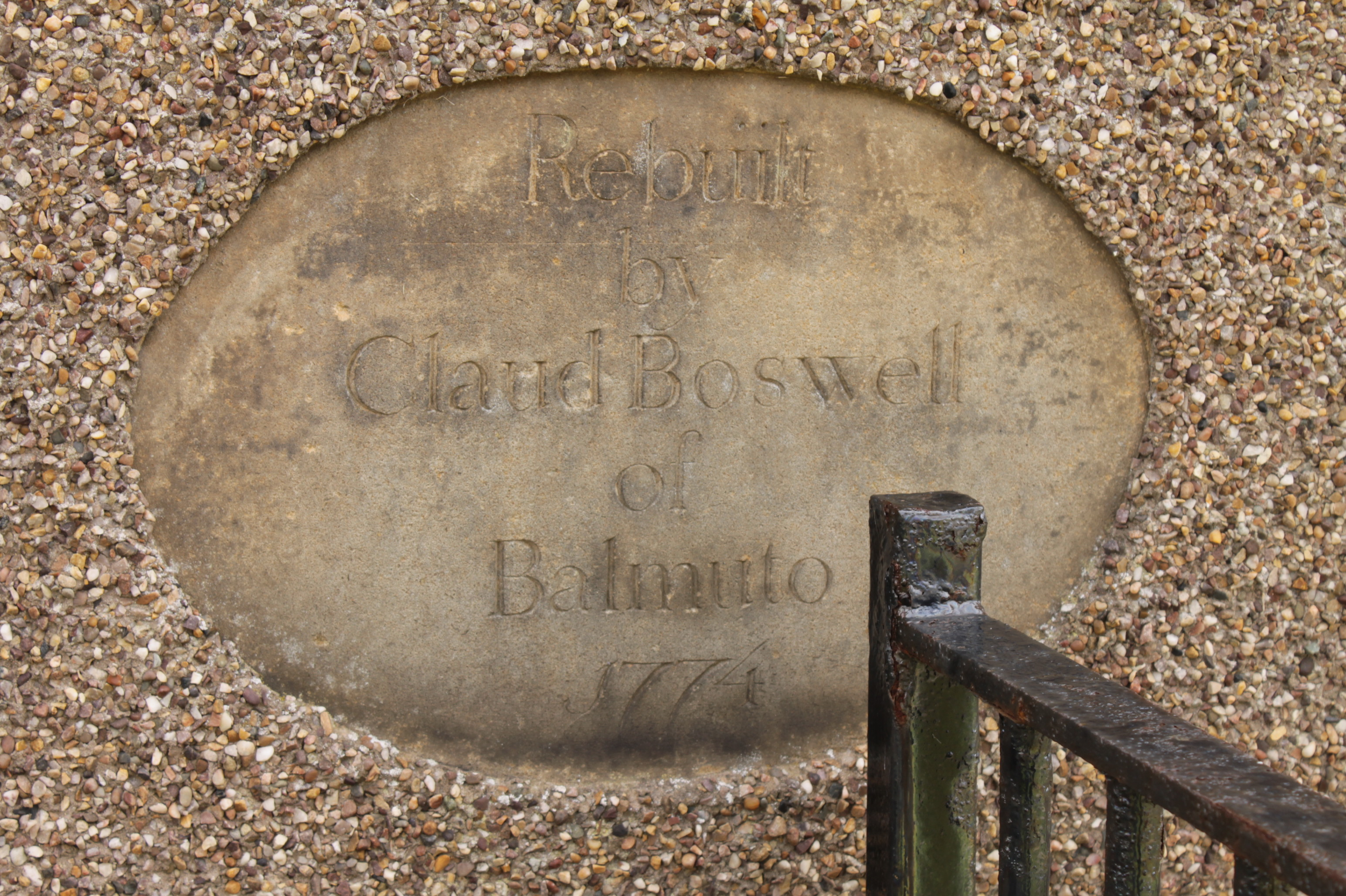
Plaque to Lord Balmuto on Kinghorn Church in Fife

Claud Irvine Boswell, Lord Balmuto (1742 – 22 July 1824) was a Scottish judge.

== Biography ==
The Boswell family acquired Balmuto Castle (aka Balmuto Tower) in the late 14th century.

Boswell was born at Balmuto Castle in 1742. His father, John Boswell of Balmuto, a writer to the signet in Edinburgh, died when Claud was an infant. Boswell's paternal uncle was James Boswell of Auchinleck and his son (Boswell's cousin) was James Boswell, companion of Samuel Johnson.

At the age of six he was sent to Mr Barclay's school in Dalkeith. After finishing his education at the University of Edinburgh, he was admitted a member of the Faculty of Advocates on 2 August 1766.

While at university he befriended Henry Hunter and employed him as a tutor.

In 1774 he organised and paid for the rebuilding of Kinghorn Parish Church.

On 25 March 1780 he was appointed Sheriff Depute of Fife and Kinross. After serving this office for 19 years was, he was appointed a lord of session on the death of James Burnett, Lord Monboddo. On 21 June 1799, he took his seat on the bench with the title of Lord Balmuto. After nearly 23 years of judicial work he resigned in January 1822, and was succeeded by William Erskine, Lord Kinneder.

== Death ==
The death, under his own roof, of his kinsman, Sir Alexander Boswell, from the effects of a wound received by him in the duel with James Stuart of Dunearn, gave him a shock from which he never entirely recovered. He died at Balmuto on 22 July 1824, in his 83rd year.

== Personal life ==
He was a robust and athletic man, with black hair and beetling eyebrows. His manner was boisterous and his temper passionate. Though fond of joking, a habit he sometimes indulged in on the bench, he was not particularly keen in the perception of wit in others.

In 1783 he married Anne Irvine, who, by the death of her brother and grandfather, became the heiress of Kingcussie. They had two daughters and a son. Two etchings of him will be found in Kay, Nos. 262 and 300.
