= John Hall (minister) =

John Hall (ca. 1559 – August 1627) was the Moderator of the General Assembly of the Church of Scotland, meeting in Burntisland in 1601. He was nominated as "Constant Moderator" in 1606.

The Assembly asked King James the VI of Scotland to order a revised translation of the Holy Scriptures (the Bible). It seems that this was the King’s own suggestion, but, despite expressing admiration for the King’s considerable linguistic and theological abilities, the Assembly declined to invite him onto the committee it set up to carry out this task. The main task was to revise an already existing English (that is to say, not Scots) translation - the so-called Geneva Bible which contained extensive footnotes and explanations, many of them not acceptable to the King. It was not until he became King James I of England that he commissioned a group of English clergy and scholars to complete this task. The result was the famous Authorised Version of the Scriptures, a book that has had enormous effects on the English language as well as on the civil and religious history of the English speaking peoples.

== Life ==
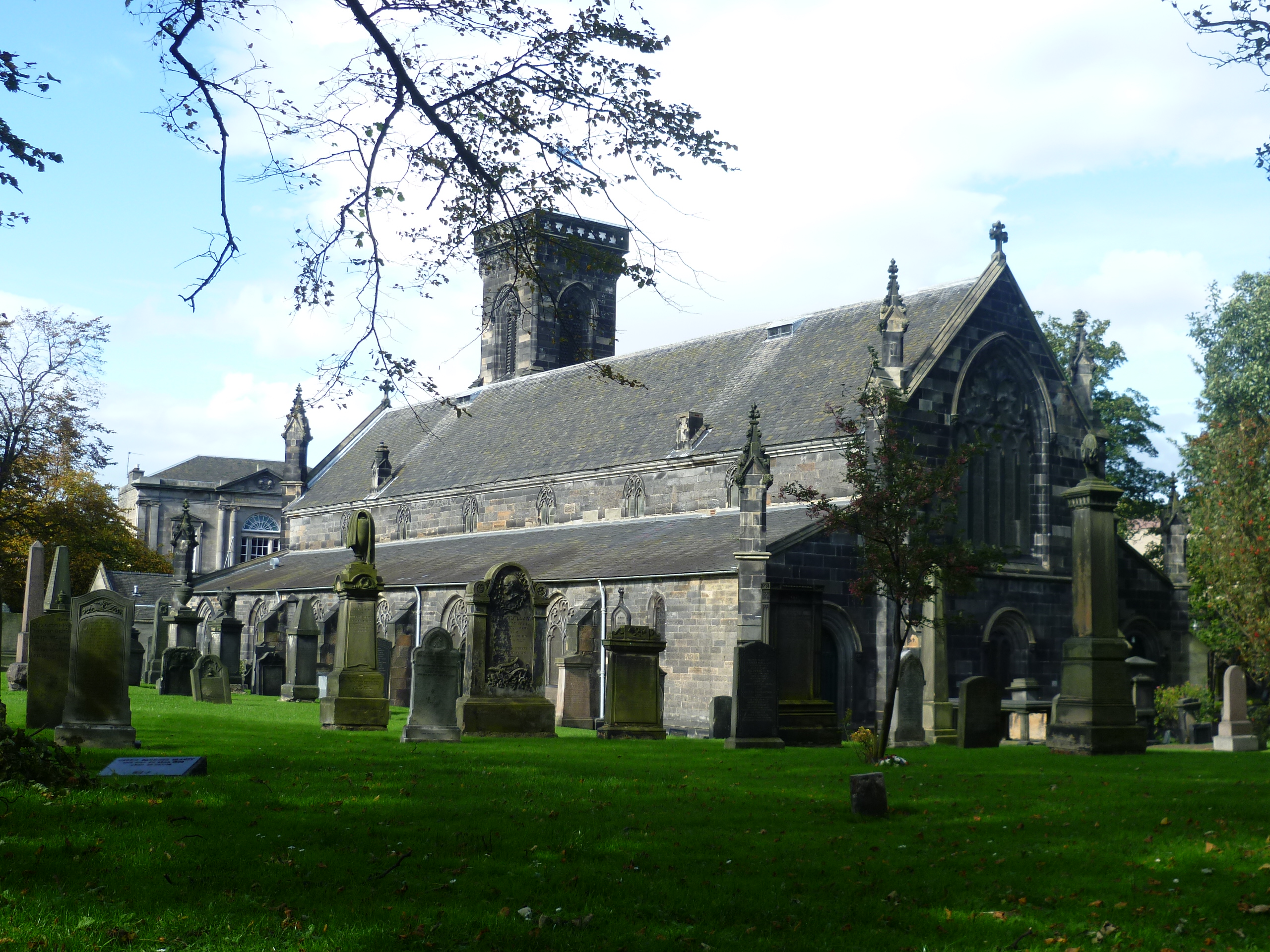
South Leith Parish Church

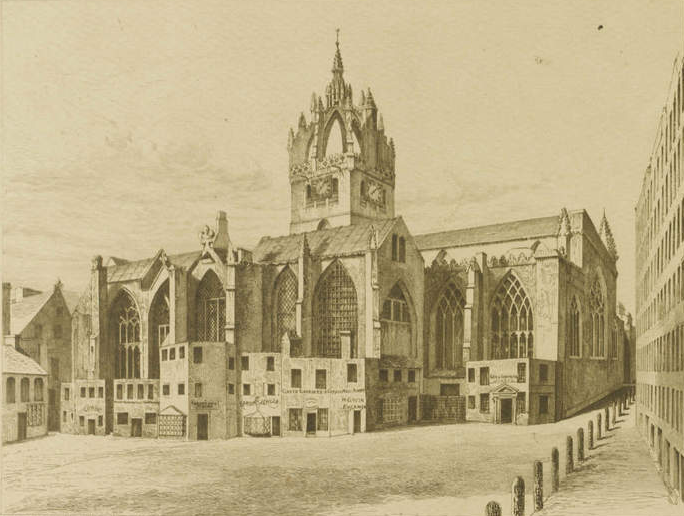
St Giles' in the 17th century

John Hall was born in Kirkcudbright in about 1559, an area with later significant Covenanting associations. His father, Andrew Hall, was a merchant and burgess of the town. John trained for the Ministry of the Church of Scotland and is recorded as being Minister of Colinton, (or Hailes), in Edinburgh in 1579. In 1586 he is recorded as being part of a commission to try some people in Lothian suspected of heresy. He was appointed Minister of South Leith Parish Church on 24 October 1596. Two years later, on 7 December 1598, he was appointed Minister of the Second Charge (there were four parishes based in the one Kirk at this time) at St Giles, Edinburgh. In 1600, the King forbade him to preach anywhere in his kingdom, because he had declined to offer prayers of thanksgiving for the Kings safe deliverance for the Gowrie Conspiracy. Apparently, Hall did not fully believe there had been a plot to kill the king. However, when called before the Privy Council on 10 September 1600, he declared himself satisfied that there had been a plot. He was reinstated. He was appointed constant Moderator of the Presbytery in 1606 and was twice a member of the Court of High Commission, which James used to enforce religious conformity. He later extended this to England, (15 February 1610 and 21 December 1615). He was a member of the General Assembly of the Church of Scotland in 1610.

In 1616, together with John Adamson, minister of Liberton, he wrote a Confession of Faith and Catechism. In 1617 he signed the Protestation for the Liberties of the Kirk. He later withdrew his protest. Being old and infirm, he resigned in March 1619. The same year he published his Catechism in Edinburgh. He continued active in the politics of the time. He was suspected of encouraging opposition to the King’s policy in the church - so-called Articles of Perth - so the Privy Council ordered him to retire to Montrose.

He died in Montrose in August 1627.

== Family ==
He was married to Margaret Arnot, and had four sons -John, William, Andrew (baptised 19 July 1601); and Robert (baptised 19 October 1604).

== Publications ==
- Confession of Faith and Catechism (1616) written with Rev John Adamson of Liberton
- Catechism (1619)
