= Film Cuts =

Compilation album by The Chieftains
- Released: 1996
- Recorded: Windmill Lane Studios, Dublin
- Genre: Celtic
- Label: RCA
- Producer: Paddy Moloney

The Chieftains chronology
The Long Black Veil (1995)	Film Cuts (1996)	Santiago (1996)

Professional ratings
Review scores
Source	Rating
Allmusic	4/5 stars

Film Cuts is an album released by the Irish musical group The Chieftains in 1996. The album is a collection of music by The Chieftains used in the motion picture soundtracks of Rob Roy, Circle of Friends, Treasure Island, Barry Lyndon, Lovespell a.k.a. Tristan and Isolde, The Grey Fox, Far and Away, and a documentary: Ireland Moving.

== Track listing ==
1. Rob Roy: O'Sullivan's March - 4:03
2. Circle of Friends: Dublin - 2:32
3. Circle of Friends: Air- You're the One - 3:51
4. Treasure Island: Opening Theme - 1:03
5. Treasure Island: Loyals March - 1:51
6. Treasure Island: Island Theme - 2:32
7. Treasure Island: Setting Sail - 2:37
8. Treasure Island: French Leave - 1:51
9. Treasure Island: Blind Pew - 2:10
10. Treasure Island: Treasure Cave - 2:12
11. Treasure Island: The Hispanola/Silver and Loyals March - 3:06
12. Barry Lyndon: Love Theme - 3:31
13. Tristan and Isolde: Love Theme- 2:17
14. Tristan and Isolde: The Falcon - 1:37
15. Tristan and Isolde: The Departure - 3:23
16. The Grey Fox: Main Theme - 6:03
17. Far and Away: Fighting for Dough - 2:04
18. Ireland Moving: Ireland Moving-Train Sequence - 1:43

== Musicians ==
- Derek Bell - Irish harp, tiompan, harpsichord
- Martin Fay - violin, bones
- Seán Keane - violin
- Matt Molloy - flute
- Paddy Moloney - Uilleann pipes, flute
- Kevin Conneff - bodhrán

== Sources and links ==
- Film Cuts at AllMusic
