= Brian Godawa =

American screenwriter and author (born 1961)

- Born: Brian James Godawa; November 10, 1961 (age 65); Arlington Heights, Illinois
- Education: Northern Illinois University
- Occupations: Author, screenwriter
- Spouse: Kimberly Godawa
- Parent(s): Erwin Godawa; Lorraine Godawa
- Website: godawa.com

Brian James Godawa (born November 10, 1961) is an American screenwriter and author. He wrote the screenplays for To End All Wars and The Visitation, and co-wrote Change Your Life! with Adam Christing and My Son Hunter with Phelim McAleer.

Godawa's book, Hollywood Worldviews: Watching Films with Wisdom and Discernment (ISBN 0830837132), is in its ninth printing. He is also a contributor to the BioLogos Forum.

His Biblical Fantasy books, the Nephilim Chronicles, are an imaginative retelling of Biblical stories of the Nephilim giants, the secret plans of the fallen Watchers (angel), and the War of the Seed of Serpent with the Seed of Eve. The sequel series, Chronicles of the Apocalypse, tells the story of John the Apostle's Book of Revelation. The Chronicles of the Watchers "recounts true history through the Watcher paradigm."

== Early and personal life ==
Godawa was born on November 10, 1961, in Arlington Heights, Illinois, to Erwin and Lorraine Godawa. He attended Northern Illinois University, where he received his Bachelor of Fine Arts with Honors in Illustration. He resides near Los Angeles, California, with his wife Kimberly.

== Other works ==
=== Chronicles of the Nephilim Book series ===
1. Noah Primeval (2011) (ISBN 0615550789)
2. Enoch Primordial (2012) (ISBN 0985930926)
3. Gilgamesh Immortal (2012) (ISBN 0985930942)
4. Abraham Allegiant (2013) (ISBN 0985930985)
5. Joshua Valiant (2013) (ISBN 0985930993)
6. Caleb Vigilant (2013) (ISBN 0991143418)
7. David Ascendant (2014) (ISBN 0991143469)
8. Jesus Triumphant (2015) (ISBN 1942858027)

=== Chronicles of the Apocalypse Book series ===
1. Tyrant :Rise of the Beast (2017) (ISBN 1942858256)
2. Remnant: Rescue of the Elect (2017) (ISBN 1942858280)
3. Resistant: Revolt of the Jews (2018) (ISBN 1942858353)
4. Judgement: Wrath of the Lamb (2018) (ISBN 1942858426)

=== Chronicles of the Watchers Book series ===
1. Jezebel: Harlot Queen of Israel (2016)
2. Qin : Dragon Emperor of China (2018)
3. Moses: Against the Gods of Egypt (2021)
4. Judah Maccabee Part 1: Abomination of Desolation (2024)
5. Judah Maccabee Part 2: Against the Gods of Greece (2025)

==== Related books ====
- The Spiritual World of Ancient China and the Bible (2019)
- The Spiritual World of Jezebel and Elijah (2019)

=== Watchers, The Nephilim, and the Cosmic War of the Seed ===
1. When Giants Were Upon the Earth (2021)
2. When Watchers Ruled the Nations (2020)

=== Other books ===
- Hollywood Worldviews: Watching Films with Wisdom and Discernment (2002)
- Word Pictures: Knowing God Through Story and Imagination (2009) (ISBN 0830837094)
- Myth Became Fact: Storytelling, Imagination, and Apologetics in the Bible (2012) (ISBN 0985930969)
- When Giants Were Upon the Earth: The Watchers, the Nephilim, and the Biblical Cosmic War of the Seed (2014)
- The Book of Enoch: Scripture, Heresy or What? (2016)
- God Against the Gods: Storytelling, Imagination and Apologetics in the Bible (2016)
- End Times Bible Prophecy: It's Not What They Told You (2017)
- Israel in Bible Prophecy: The New Testament Fulfillment of the Promise to Abraham (2017)
- Psalm 82: The Divine Council of the Gods, the Judgment of the Watchers and the (2018)
- Inheritance of the Nations (2018)
- The Spiritual World of Ancient China and the Bible: Biblical Background to the Novel Qin: Dragon Emperor of China (2019)
- The Spiritual World of Jezebel and Elijah: Biblical Background to the Novel Jezebel: Harlot Queen of Israel (2019)
- When Watchers Ruled the Nations: Pagan Gods at War with Israel's God and the Spiritual World of the Bible (2020)
