= FrackNation =

- Directed by: Ann McElhinney; Phelim McAleer; Magdalena Segieda
- Distributed by: Magnet Releasing
- Release date: 2013
- Countries: United States; United Kingdom; Poland
- Language: English

FrackNation is a feature documentary created by Phelim McAleer, Ann McElhinnery, and Magdalena Segieda. The film, released in 2013, claims to address alleged misinformation from environmentalists about the process of hydraulic fracturing, commonly called fracking.

FrackNation looks at the process of fracking for natural gas and seeks to address the concerns surrounding the process that were highlighted in the fracking-critical film Gasland.

== Inspiration ==
FrackNation was inspired when documentary filmmaker Phelim McAleer asked Josh Fox, the director of the 2010 documentary Gasland, some questions at an event in Chicago. While Fox was promoting his film project McAleer confronted him about the historical records of people being able to ignite methane in water at "burning springs" long before fracking started. McAleer told the Los Angeles Times that Fox did not include that information in his film because he did not think it was relevant towards the current drilling impacts of certain areas. The people interviewed in Fox's film claimed that the contamination was caused by the drilling.

After a video of the questioning was made public on various websites, Fox and his lawyers got the video removed from YouTube and Vimeo. However, FrackNation's filmmakers managed to fight the removal and restore access to the video despite claims of infringing on HBO's copyrights.

McAleer told Politico he was motivated to make the film by what he saw as the "one-sided approach taken by the media, 'outsiders' and 'urban elites'" on the fracking process. McAleer said there has been no real debate on the issue, with the environmental lobby relying on emotion and scare tactics to condemn fracking.

In an interview with the Pittsburgh Post-Gazette McAleer stressed the film is trying to show both sides of the fracking discussion. "We're definitely covering the contamination" in the film, McAleer said. "We feature both sides."

== Reception ==
There were positive reviewers that regarded the film as well researched. Jeannette Catsoulis, a film reviewer for the New York Times, noted that the movie was methodically researched and showed the "sheer complexity" of fracking. Variety said the film examined the process of fracking, giving counterarguments for the Gasland documentary, especially the flaming faucets scene. The magazine noted that the documentary did a thorough job of technical information and personal stories of farmers who live near fracking locations. The National Review noted that FrackNation did an excellent job refuting Gasland based upon the scientific research in the film.

Some reviews claimed that the film was able to refute not only the factual claims of Gasland but also some of the emotional testimonies. Christopher Campbell, from Movies.com, said the documentary was "surprisingly engaging" and that the most interesting case against Gasland that was brought up was the easy acceptance by journalists of the film as fact, implying journalists have ignored their responsibilities of fact-checking all documentaries. The review noted that because the film did not accept money from the energy industry, it gave the film more credibility, though some of the donors were some of the farmers who were featured in the film.

There were negative reviews of the film. Miriam Bale of the New York Daily News wrote, "With many of McAleer’s facts coming from casual Internet searches (backed by boring shots of the computer screen), the accuracy of this crowdsourced documentary — funded by small donations on Kickstarter — seems as reliable as a Wikipedia entry." Mark Olsen of the LA Times criticized the film as "unfocused," with several moments that are "theatrical but irrelevant," calling the film "a one-sided attack piece" that "doesn't add much to the conversation." John Anderson of Variety found the film's use of staged confrontations ineffective and manipulative, writing that "McAleer’s sandbagging of Carol Collier, executive director of the Delaware River Basin Commission, seems pointless, except as an effort to get an anti-fracking official to look like she’s got something to hide."

== Funding ==
A public crowd funding campaign was launched on Kickstarter on Feb. 6, 2012. FrackNation was featured as the most popular project in Kickstarter's film section. It reached the fundraising target of $150,000 within three weeks of launching.

The filmmakers offered an executive producer credit to anyone who supports the project. FrackNation has 3,305 executive producers. The average individual pledge to the film was $60.

McAleer and McElhinney claimed to have returned all funds raised from companies or senior executives in the gas industry, according to Valerie Richardson of the Colorado Observer.

However, the independence of special interests in the film's funding has been questioned. Erich Schwartzel of the Pittsburgh Post-Gazette reported that, "The filmmakers want to avoid their work being labelled as pro-industry propaganda, but support for the project has been strongest among those who want to see just that. The team's Kickstarter campaign... has been promoted by pro-industry lobbying groups Energy in Depth and the Marcellus Shale Coalition."

== Release status ==
=== Theatrical ===
FrackNation had a theatrical première in New York on January 7 and in Los Angeles on January 11, 2013.

=== Television ===
On December 17, 2012 Mark Cuban's AXS.tv announced that they had acquired the television rights to FrackNation, and the documentary had its television première on January 22, 2013 at 9 p.m. EDT. AXS.tv timed the debut to coincide with the theatrical release of Promised Land, Matt Damon and John Krasinski's feature film about how the fracking debate affects a rural town.

Cuban says he welcomes the controversy and discussion, and the release of FrackNation should only fuel the fracking debate. “Of course the timing is relevant,” Cuban told The Hollywood Reporter. “We want people talking and using #AXSTV when they watch and discuss it.”

=== International Monetary Fund ===
Phelim McAleer accused the International Monetary Fund (IMF) of censorship when the organization invited him to speak at a two-day joint IMF-Oxford University conference on commodity prices in Washington, D.C. but refused to show a clip of FrackNation that suggests fracking would ease dependence on imports in some Eastern European countries. McAleer accused IMF of being afraid of offending Russia and therefore censoring his right to free speech.

=== United States Congressional Committee ===
The movie was shown to the House Committee on Science, Space, and Technology, Subcommittee on Environment in February 2013.

=== European Parliament ===
On February 10, 2014 the movie was shown in the European Parliament. This was the Europe-wide première with attendance of the movie director Phelim McAleer organized by YoungPetro a Petroleum Magazine.

== See also ==
- Not Evil Just Wrong
- Mine Your Own Business
- Frackman
