= The Year of the French =

The Year of the French may refer to:

- The Year of the French (album), a 1983 album by The Chieftains
- The Year of the French (TV serial), a 1982 television serial based on the novel by Thomas Flanagan
- The Year of the French (novel), a 1979 novel by Thomas Flanagan
