= Cyrina Fiallo =

American actress

- Born: December 29, 1991 (age 34); Miami, Florida, U.S.
- Occupations: Actress, Filmmaker
- Years active: 2007–present
- Spouse: Jonathan Kalter (m. 2023)

Cyrina Fiallo (born December 29, 1991) is an American actress and filmmaker.

== Early life and career ==
Cyrina Fiallo was born in Miami, Florida, and is of Cuban and Italian descent. Fiallo is best known for her recurring role as Vonnie on the Disney Channel sitcom Good Luck Charlie. She also has guest starred on Everybody Hates Chris, Community, Gigantic, Glee, Switched at Birth, Girl Meets World and Supernatural. She also starred in the internet television series My Alibi and The Subpranos, the latter of which she co-wrote, co-directed and co-produced with fellow actress Chrissie Fit.

She is also a member of the cover group The Girls, alongside fellow actresses Alison Brie and Julianna Guill.

Fiallo has appeared in numerous TV commercials for various retailers, such as Verizon, Allstate, Booking.com, Capital One, Pepsi, Samsung, and Subaru.

In October 2022, Fiallo provided the narration for the audiobook of the novel entitled, Witchlings by Claribel A. Ortega.

== Personal life ==
In November 2023, Fiallo married Jonathan Kalter in her home town of Miami, Florida.

== Filmography ==
=== Filmmaking credits ===
- Someone to Carry You (2021)

Film
Year	Title	Role	Notes
2007	Winter and Spring	Aurelia	
2010	Delusions of Love: A Case Study in Jealousy and 19th Century Formal Wear	Mary	Short film
2010	Freeport	Beth	Short film
2011	Friends 4ever	Lisa	Short film
2012	je vous adore	Claire	Short film
2013	It Remains		Short film
2016	Killing Poe	Wynona Thompson	
2018	Gosnell: The Trial of America's Biggest Serial Killer	Molly Mullaney	

Television
Year	Title	Role	Notes
2007	Room 401	Debra	Episode: "Spare Some Change"
2008	Little Miss CEO	Cousin Hilary	Unsold TV pilot
2008	Quitters	Cyrina	Unsold TV pilot
2008	Everybody Hates Chris	Gigi	Episode: "Everybody Hates Cake"
2009	A Marriage	Jenelle	Unsold TV pilot
2008–2009	My Alibi	Marley Carabello	Lead role
2009	My Date	Gemma	Episode: "Must Love Tech"
2010	My Roommate the	Mildred	Episode: "Hipster"
2010	The Subpranos	Giovana Stratatelli	Lead role
2010	Made... The Movie	Tuba	Lead role, television film
2011	Community	Claire	Episode: "Early 21st Century Romanticism"
2011	Gigantic	Tara	Episode: "Scramble"
2012	Switched at Birth	Art Student Girl	Episode: "The Art of Painting"
2012–2014	Good Luck Charlie	Vonnie	Recurring role, 7 episodes
2012	Supernatural	Delta Mendota	Episode: "A Little Slice of Kevin"
2014	Glee	Web Critic	Episode: "Opening Night"
2014	Criminal Minds	Jesse Moore	Episode: "Angels"
2015	Girl Meets World	Ms. Oben	Episode: "Girl Meets Farkle"
2016	RePlay	Sasha	Lead Role; go90 original series
2016	The Fosters	Gabby	Episode: "Now for Then"
2016	Rush Hour	Mrs. Ortiz/Lawyer	Episode: "Knock, Knock... House Creeping!"
2016	We're Not Alone	Carly	5 episodes
2017	Budding Prospects	Marianna	TV movie
2017	Temporary	Sam	4 episodes
2017	StartUp	Cassi	2 episodes
2017	Overdue	Bea Jones	6 episodes
2018	Brooklyn Nine-Nine	Nikki	Episode: "Safe House"
2018	Barry	Woman #1	Episode: "Chapter Three: Make the Unsafe Choice"
2018	Life in Pieces	Mavis	Episode: "Renter Portrait Plagiarism Scam"
2018	Bizaardvark	Rory Finch	Episode: "No Way, Whoa!"
2018	Over the Hill	School Teacher	TV movie
2019	Abby's	Dani	Episode: "Free Alcohol Day"
2020–2021	Raven's Home	Mei	2 Episodes: "Baking Bad", "10 Things Debate About You"
2021	9-1-1: Lone Star	Tonya	2 Episodes: "Back in the Saddle", "Slow Burn"
2022	The Vindicators	Calypso (voice)	3 episodes
2023	Erin & Aaron	Miss Nelson	Episode: "Un-break My Heart"
2025	StuGo	Mariana Trent (voice)	Episode: "Deep Trent"
2025	High Potential	Asha	Episode: "Pawns"

Video games
Year	Title	Role
2013	Grand Theft Auto V	The Local Population
2014	The Crew	Alita
2015	Call of Duty: Black Ops III	Additional Voices
2018–2023	Epic Seven	Lilias, Conqueror Lilias, Midnight Gala Lilias, Elena, Astromancer Elena
2023	Starfield	UC Security
