= Promised Land (2012 film) =

2012 film by Gus Van Sant

- Theatrical release poster
- Directed by: Gus Van Sant
- Screenplay by: John Krasinski; Matt Damon
- Story by: Dave Eggers
- Produced by: Chris Moore; Matt Damon; John Krasinski
- Starring: Matt Damon; John Krasinski; Frances McDormand; Rosemarie DeWitt; Hal Holbrook
- Cinematography: Linus Sandgren
- Edited by: Billy Rich
- Music by: Danny Elfman
- Production companies: Participant Media; Image Nation Abu Dhabi; Pearl Street Films; Sunday Night Productions
- Distributed by: Focus Features
- Release dates: December 4, 2012 (New York City); January 4, 2013 (United States)
- Running time: 106 minutes
- Country: United States
- Language: English
- Budget: $15 million
- Box office: $12.3 million

Promised Land is a 2012 American drama film directed by Gus Van Sant and starring Matt Damon, John Krasinski, Frances McDormand, Rosemarie DeWitt and Hal Holbrook. The screenplay by Damon and Krasinski is based on a story by Dave Eggers. Promised Land follows two petroleum landmen who visit a rural Pennsylvania town in an attempt to buy drilling rights from the local residents.

Damon also produced the film with Krasinski and Chris Moore, and was initially attached to direct, but was replaced by Van Sant. Filming took place mainly in Pittsburgh from early to mid-2012. During filming and afterward, the film's highlighting of the resource extraction process hydraulic fracturing, known as "fracking," emerged as a topic of debate.

The film had a limited release in the United States on December 28, 2012, and followed with a nationwide expansion on January 4, 2013. The film had its international premiere and received Special Mention Award at the 63rd Berlin International Film Festival in February 2013. It received mixed reviews from critics, although the National Board of Review named it one of the top ten films of 2012, and was a box office bomb, grossing just $12 million against a $15 million budget.

== Plot ==
Steve Butler has caught the eyes of top management at his employer, Global Crosspower Solutions, an energy company that specializes in obtaining natural gas trapped underground through fracking. He has a track record of quickly and cheaply persuading landowners to sign mineral rights leases that grant his employer drilling rights. Butler and his partner, Sue Thomason, arrive in an economically struggling Pennsylvania farming town whose residents are proud of their family farms passed down from one generation to the next.

Coming from a town and a life very similar to that of the people he is now determined to win over for Global, Butler tells the story of how his own town died after the local Caterpillar assembly plant closed. The idea of a town surviving solely on family farms being passed down through generations as a viable economy is one that he can no longer accept. He insists he is offering the town its last chance. Butler spends some pleasant after-hours time with Alice, a teacher he meets in a bar.

The community seems willing to accept Global's offer until the elderly high school science teacher, Frank Yates, a retired, successful engineer, raises questions about fracking's safety at a town meeting. It has been decided that people will vote in a few weeks on whether to accept the offer.

After hearing about the vote, unknown environmental advocate Dustin Noble starts a grassroots campaign against Global. He is motivated by a tale of his family losing its Nebraska dairy farm after the herd died as a result of Global's industry-standard fracking process.

Butler begins to encounter considerable resistance in town. Noble seems to be winning over nearly everyone, including Alice. One night, Butler receives a package from Global that includes an enlarged photograph of dead cattle in a field, which Noble said came from his family's Nebraska farm.

The enlargement shows that the structure thought to be a silo is, in fact, a lighthouse, which does not exist in Nebraska, revealing that Noble fabricated his story and deceived the people. The picture was actually taken in Lafayette, Louisiana, where Global is in the midst of a lawsuit over environmental issues that were likely caused by its use of fracking.

Butler informs the town's mayor of the deception, who then tells the rest of the town. He returns to the hotel to find Noble loading his truck, preparing to leave town. Noble accidentally reveals that he knows the picture with the lighthouse was taken in Lafayette.

Butler realizes the only way Noble could have known this information is if Global also employed him, and that Noble's job had been to discredit the environmental movement and convince the town to vote in favor of Global's offer. He arranged for Butler to receive the "confidential" photos and engineered the entire public relations effort.

At a town meeting the next day, the citizens are prepared to vote on Global's efforts to buy drilling rights to their property. Butler tells them that the barn in the picture reminds him of his grandfather's barn. He reveals that Noble has manipulated them and is employed by Global.

As Butler leaves the meeting, he finds Thomason on the phone with Global. She tells him he is fired and that she is leaving for New York. Butler walks to Alice's home, and she welcomes him in.

== Cast ==
- Matt Damon as Steve Butler
- John Krasinski as Dustin Noble
- Frances McDormand as Sue Thomason
- Rosemarie DeWitt as Alice
- Scoot McNairy as Jeff Dennon
- Titus Welliver as Rob
- Terry Kinney as David Churchill
- Tim Guinee as Drew Scott
- Lucas Black as Paul Geary
- Hal Holbrook as Frank Yates

== Production ==
Promised Land is directed by Gus Van Sant based on a screenplay by Matt Damon and John Krasinski, who are film producers along with Chris Moore. In interviews, Krasinski and Damon said that the idea for the movie was partially inspired by an investigative series of stories in The New York Times by Ian Urbina, called "Drilling Down", about fracking. The screenplay was based on a story by Dave Eggers. Krasinski came up with the film's premise and developed the idea with Eggers. They pitched the idea to Damon, suggesting that both Damon and Krasinski would write and star in the film. The project was set up at Warner Bros. with Damon attached as director in October 2011, in what would have been his directorial debut. Filming was scheduled to begin in early 2012.

In January 2012, Damon stepped down as director due to scheduling conflicts but remained involved with the project. Damon contacted Gus Van Sant, who directed him in the 1997 film Good Will Hunting, and Van Sant joined the project as director. The project was in turnaround at Warner Bros., and by February, Focus Features and Participant Media acquired rights to produce the film. The title was announced to be Promised Land. With a production budget of $15 million, filming began in Pennsylvania in late April 2012. The Commonwealth of Pennsylvania provided the production company $4 million in tax credits since filming would provide jobs and revenue. More than eighty percent of the crew were hired out of Pittsburgh. Filming mostly took place in Avonmore, Pennsylvania, which was the main setting for the film's rural town of McKinley. Additional filming locations for the town were locations in Armstrong County, including Apollo, Worthington, and Slate Lick. Other filming locations in Pennsylvania were Alexandria, Delmont, Export, and West Mifflin. Filming also took place at the Grand Concourse at Station Square in Pittsburgh. Several hundred extras were hired for the film, and filming lasted for 30 days.

=== Music ===
The film score was composed by Danny Elfman. Three songs by The Milk Carton Kids, including "Snake Eyes", "The Ash & Clay", and "Jewel of June", were also written for the film.

== Oil industry controversy ==
Promised Land was criticized by the energy industry for its portrayal of the resource extraction process hydraulic fracturing, colloquially known as "fracking". The portrayal was first reported in April 2012 by filmmakers raising funds for the pro-fracking documentary FrackNation. They said, "Promised Land will increase unfounded concerns about fracking." Phelim McAleer, the director of FrackNation, said Dimock, Pennsylvania was the likely inspiration for Promised Land. McAleer said despite Dimock families' claims that fracking activity contaminated their water, the state and EPA scientists did not find anything wrong. In September 2012, CNBC reported that a group of residents from Armstrong County, Pennsylvania were protesting the film and formed a Facebook group. The group said, "They filmed this movie in our backyard. They told us it would be fair to drilling. It's not. We're p*ssed [sic]." Mike Knapp, one of the organizers of the Facebook group said, "One of the things that really aggravates me, is that they seem to have a very condescending view" of farmers as portrayed in the film.

Krasinski, who co-wrote the screenplay and plays Dustin, said the film's original premise involved wind power. Krasinski said wind power was replaced by fracking as the more relevant backdrop in recent news coverage. The Huffington Post reported, "The procedure has caused concern due in part to the chemicals injected into the wells for drilling, which may taint nearby drinking water." It said Damon had posted in 2010 a YouTube video to promote the Working Families Party, which works "to prevent risky natural gas drilling". Politico said Promised Land reflected a trend about fracking since the release of the 2010 documentary film Gasland, which was nominated for an Academy Award for Best Documentary.

Leading up to the film's release, a spokesperson for Independent Petroleum Association of America said, "We have to address the concerns that are laid out in these types of films." The industry planned to send scientific studies to film critics, distribute leaflets to film audiences, and use social media like Facebook and Twitter in response to the film. Where the industry launched "direct attacks" at Gasland, it instead sought to portray Promised Land as "derivative, condescending and clichéd". In Pennsylvania, the industry group Marcellus Shale Coalition bought a 16-second onscreen ad to be shown at 75 percent of theaters in the state at the same time Promised Land was released.

James Schamus, chief executive of the film's distributor Focus Features said, "We've been surprised at the emergence of what looks like a concerted campaign targeting the film even before anyone's seen it." As the film was released, he said, "Fracking is a great premise for real drama. It represents Americans deeply conflicted about how to deal with these issues." He compared the industry's stealth campaign against the film to the one depicted within the film.

== Release ==
=== Theatrical run ===
Promised Land had a limited release on December 28, 2012. The film was released in 25 theaters and grossed an estimated $53,000 on its first day, a "sobering" average of $2,120. For the opening weekend, Promised Land grossed an estimated $190,000. Box Office Mojo reported before the film's wide release the following week, "It's unlikely that it will be able to pull many people away from the various other appealing options in theaters right now." Promised Land expanded to 1,676 theaters on January 4, 2013. It grossed $4.3 million over the weekend, which the Los Angeles Times judged as "a bad start" even with its $15 million budget. Audiences polled by CinemaScore gave the film a "B" average grade on an A+ to F scale. The Los Angeles Times said the grade and "middling reviews" indicated the film was unlikely to be a success. By the end of its theatrical run, the film grossed $12.3 million.

The film had its international premiere at the 63rd Berlin International Film Festival in February 2013 where Gus Van Sant won a Special Mention.

=== Critical reception ===
Promised Land received mixed reviews from critics. On Rotten Tomatoes, the film has a 53% approval rating based on 154 reviews, with an average rating of 5.90/10. The website's critical consensus reads, "The earnest and well-intentioned Promised Land sports a likable cast, but it also suffers from oversimplified characterizations and a frustrating final act." Metacritic gave the film a weighted average score of 55 out of 100, based on 36 critics, indicating "mixed or average reviews". The Los Angeles Times reported that most critics felt that the film did not reach its full potential.

New York Times film critic A.O. Scott praised Promised Land as a film that "works" mainly "by putting character ahead of story" and by "inviting the actors to be warm, funny and prickly". Liam Lacey of The Globe and Mail is critical of the film: "Apart from its warm, gentle tone, much about Promised Land simply isn't good, especially the inconsistencies in the screenplay. After the mood-setting first half, things start to unravel."

== Accolades ==
| Year | Award | Category | Recipient | Result |
|---|---|---|---|---|
| 2012 | National Board of Review | Top Films | | Won |
| 2012 | National Board of Review | Freedom of Expression Award | | Won |
| 2013 | Berlin Film Festival | Golden Bear | Gus Van Sant | Nominated |
| 2013 | Young Artist Award | Best Performance in a Feature Film - Supporting Young Actress Ten and Under | Lexi Cowan | Nominated |
| 2013 | Environmental Media Awards | Ongoing Commitment Award | Matt Damon | Won |
| 2013 | Environmental Media Awards | Feature Film Award | | Won |
