= My Son Hunter =

- Promotional poster
- Directed by: Robert Davi
- Written by: Brian Godawa; Phelim McAleer
- Produced by: Phelim McAleer; Ann McElhinney
- Starring: Laurence Fox; Gina Carano; John James
- Cinematography: Vladimir Ilic
- Edited by: Ricky Stone
- Production company: The Unreported Story Society
- Distributed by: Breitbart News
- Release date: September 7, 2022
- Running time: 95 minutes
- Country: United States
- Language: English
- Budget: $2.75 million

My Son Hunter is a 2022 American biographical comedy film directed by Robert Davi and starring Laurence Fox, Gina Carano and John James. The film centers on Hunter Biden, a son of US president Joe Biden. It is, according to The Guardian's Catherine Shoard, the "debut fiction attempt" of documentarians Ann McElhinney and Phelim McAleer. The film is being distributed by American far-right news website Breitbart News, and was released on September 7, 2022.

== Synopsis ==
My Son Hunter is a 2022 political satire and comedy that dramatizes the controversial business dealings and hedonistic lifestyle of Hunter Biden, the son of U.S. President Joe Biden. The film centers on Hunter Biden (played by Laurence Fox), who is exaggeratedly depicted leading a chaotic, drug-fueled party lifestyle while navigating a tangled web of alleged business dealings with foreign oligarchs in Ukraine and China. It portrays him as deeply flawed, intoxicated, and overwhelmed by his "screw-up" status while simultaneously presenting him through a sympathetic lens as he navigates the immense pressures of his life and humanly struggles with addiction. The producers stated that the film depicts the alleged "business dealings and lifestyle of Hunter Biden".

== Cast ==
- Laurence Fox as Hunter Biden
- Gina Carano as Agent Hound, a secret service agent
- John James as U.S. president Joe Biden
- Emma Gojkovic as Grace "Kitty" Henderson
- Franklin Ayodele as Tyrone
- Joe Nichols as Terence
- Jay Lim as Ye Jianming
- Ljubisa Milisic as Mykola Zlochevsky
- Sasa Djordjevic as Viktor Yanukovych
- Donald Borza II as Dinesh D'Souza
- Dean Jones as Stephen Miller
- Starr Jones as Louie Gohmert
- Nenad Herakovic as Devon Archer

== Development and filming ==
Two Irish filmmakers, Ann McElhinney and Phelim McAleer, developed the film. When the film was first announced, it introduced its attempt to raise 2.5 million dollars via a private crowdfunding site. The project raised over 2.5 million dollars from crowdfunding on its official site. Pre-production started as early as February 2021 according to star Gina Carano. The movie's crew includes Robert Davi as director, and Phelim McAleer & Ann McElhinney as producers.

Gina Carano, who played a "world-weary" secret service agent in the film stated: "The script was instantly intriguing and side achingly hilarious to me, especially after being newly exposed to the political realm in 2020. Robert Davi is someone who reached out to me as soon as I was 'canceled' in Feb. 2021. I signed on in support of him and one of my favorite humans, Laurence Fox."

Production began in October 2021 in Serbia, and lasted for four weeks. During filming John James, who portrayed Joe Biden, had an off-set injury and was rushed to the hospital, though he continued filming after treatment saying that "the show must go on".

== Reception ==
On the review aggregator website Rotten Tomatoes, 67% of 6 critics' reviews are positive, with an average rating of 6.6/10.

Armond White of National Review said that the film "serves a muckraking, restorative function", and wrote: "Make no mistake, McAleer is polemical, but My Son Hunter doesn't condemn Hunter Biden so much as understand him and the nature of his offense—thus demonstrating the ultimate form of journalistic scruples."

Naomi Fry of The New Yorker called the film "an amateurish, often batshit, if very occasionally vulgarly amusing satire-cum-thriller-cum-melodrama-cum-propaganda-organ, which switches between modes with the head-spinning unexpectedness of a Surrealist cutup."
