= Mine Your Own Business =

- Theatrical release poster
- Directed by: Phelim McAleer and Ann McElhinney
- Written by: Phelim McAleer
- Produced by: Phelim McAleer and Ann McElhinney
- Narrated by: Phelim McAleer
- Cinematography: Ian Foster
- Edited by: Mairead McIvor
- Release date: 17 October 2006
- Country: United States
- Language: English

Mine Your Own Business is a 2006 documentary film directed and produced by Phelim McAleer and Ann McElhinney about the Roșia Montană mining project, funded by a grant from Gabriel Resources, the foreign company behind the mining effort. The film documents environmentalists' opposition to the mine as unsympathetic to the needs and desires of the locals, prevents industrial progress, and consequently locks the people of the area into lives of poverty.

== Film content ==
The documentary follows Gheorghe Lucian, a 23-year-old unemployed miner from the Roşia Montană in northern Romania, whose chance of a new job disappeared after an anti-mining campaign orchestrated by foreign environmentalists. The contested mining project was expected to bring in a $1 billion investment and generate 600 jobs in an area where unemployment is 70 percent. After investigating the Romanian mine, the director McAleer and Lucian then travel to other impoverished communities in Madagascar and Chile that are also waiting for large mining projects.

In the documentary, Lucian meets Mark Fenn from the World Wildlife Fund, who is shown living in luxurious conditions, at one point showing off his $35,000 sailboat to the cameras, all the while advocating the value of living a simplistic, village life.

=== Stated purpose ===
Director Phelim McAleer has stated in interviews that the film, in its essence, is not really at all a story about mining, but rather, "It is a story about human rights. The human right to a job, the human right to have your children educated, the human right to see your child reach their first birthday." He cites among other serious concerns, the fact that high infant mortality rates are closely correlated with the sort of poverty that afflicts the region.

The film notes that the foreign environmentalists who are barring the industrial development of the area are, at best, too far removed from the people of Roşia Montană to understand their true needs and desires, and at worst, cognizant of the serious problems, and still stubbornly denying them of their right to decide the fate of their own land for themselves. McAleer points out the hypocrisy of the western environmentalists' opposition to the mining of the mineral resources, while the western world itself was built by riches that it pulled from the Earth; to deny the people of Roşia Montană the same sort of development and prosperity, he concludes, is the height of casuistry.

To respond to the claim that the mining operation would destroy Roşia Montană's "quaint" appeal, McAleer also points out that one of the Romanian government's stipulations was that Gabriel Resources would be required to clean up the existing pollution (the soil and water near the village contain high levels of cadmium and lead), and also would be required to maintain a fund with $30 million to be used for further clean-up of the area after the mining company discontinues its operations there.

== Criticisms ==
Criticisms of the film included the claim by environmentalist groups that the film was partly funded by Gabriel Resources, the Canadian mining company behind the proposed project, a fact which the filmmakers readily admit. The filmmakers disputed the implication that this funding affected the content of the film, claiming the funders had "absolutely no control" over the film and never saw any parts of the film before it was complete, allowing him to create what he called the "most independent documentary [he had] ever made." The president of Gabriel Resources, Alan Hill, said at the first screening of the movie, "Before, the environmentalists would lob mortars at us and we would keep our heads down. Now, there is a big push back."

== See also ==
- Not Evil Just Wrong
- FrackNation
