= Safe House (Brooklyn Nine-Nine) =

- Brooklyn Nine-Nine episode
- Episode no.: Season 5 Episode 12
- Directed by: Nisha Ganatra
- Written by: Andy Gosche
- Cinematography by: Giovani Lampassi
- Editing by: Jeremy Reuben
- Production code: 512
- Original air date: March 18, 2018
- Running time: 21 minutes

Guest appearances
- Marc Evan Jackson as Kevin Cozner; Paul Adelstein as Seamus Murphy; Cyrina Fiallo as Nikki

Episode chronology
← Previous "The Favor"	Next → "The Negotiation"
- Brooklyn Nine-Nine season 5

"Safe House" is the 12th episode of the fifth season of the American television police sitcom series Brooklyn Nine-Nine, and the 102nd overall episode of the series. The episode was written by Andy Gosche and directed by Nisha Ganatra. It aired on Fox in the United States on March 18, 2018. The episode features guest appearances from Marc Evan Jackson, Paul Adelstein, and Cyrina Fiallo.

The show revolves around the fictitious 99th precinct of the New York Police Department in Brooklyn and the officers and detectives that work in the precinct. In the episode, Jake Peralta (Andy Samberg) accompanies Kevin Cozner (Marc Evan Jackson) to a safe house after being threatened by Seamus Murphy (Paul Adelstein) while the rest of the precinct works to get information regarding Murphy's whereabouts.

According to Nielsen Media Research, the episode was seen by an estimated 1.92 million household viewers and gained a 0.9/4 ratings share among adults aged 18–49. The episode received very positive reviews from critics, who praised the cast's performances and the humor.

== Plot ==
Jake (Andy Samberg) and the squad retrieve Kevin (Marc Evan Jackson) from the Columbia University campus. Holt (Andre Braugher) informs them that Kevin will be sent to a safe house and Jake volunteers himself to accompany him throughout his time.

For 2 months, Jake and Kevin stay in a safe house but due to Holt's severe limitations, which include staying out of sight of the windows during daytime and no phone or Internet, they are quickly bored with their environment. This also causes a strain on Kevin's and Holt's relationship, as Kevin is unable to research his book. Meanwhile, the squad tries to track down Seamus Murphy (Paul Adelstein). Rosa (Stephanie Beatriz) goes to a hair salon and is forced to gossip and change her hair to get info out of Murphy's girlfriend, Nikki (Cyrina Fiallo). Amy (Melissa Fumero), Terry (Terry Crews), and Scully (Joel McKinnon Miller) search through a room full of shredded documents to pin down Murphy's location.

Jake decides to sneak Kevin to the New York Public Library so he can continue his research, and to avoid further straining his relationship with Holt. However, they are both caught by Holt and are forced to return to the house by bus. In the bus, they notice Murphy's henchman and Jake and Kevin escape, but Holt is captured by the henchman and brought to Murphy. Rosa sends the address she got from Nikki and the shredded documents, and Jake and Kevin arrive at Murphy's hideout. Jake is captured and about to be shot by Murphy until Kevin crashes a car into the hideout and punches Murphy in the throat, freeing them. Murphy's operation collapses and Jake and Kevin return to their normal lives.

== Reception ==
=== Viewers ===
In its original American broadcast, "Safe House" was seen by an estimated 1.92 million household viewers and gained a 0.9/4 ratings share among adults aged 18–49, according to Nielsen Media Research. This was slight increase in viewership from the previous episode, which was watched by 1.81 million viewers with a 0.7/3 in the 18-49 demographics. This means that 0.9 percent of all households with televisions watched the episode, while 4 percent of all households watching television at that time watched it. With these ratings, Brooklyn Nine-Nine was the second highest rated show on FOX for the night, beating The Last Man on Earth, Bob's Burgers and The Simpsons but behind Family Guy, fourth on its timeslot and tenth for the night, behind America's Funniest Home Videos, NCIS: Los Angeles, Family Guy, Genius Junior, Instinct, Little Big Shots, 60 Minutes, American Idol, and an NCAA Tournament game.

=== Critical reviews ===
"Safe House" received very positive reviews from critics. LaToya Ferguson of The A.V. Club gave the episode a "C" grade and wrote, "There's no problem with Brooklyn Nine-Nine taking a comedic approach to such a dark or serious subject, because that is the entire point of the series. But for 'Safe House,' while the A-story is so aggressively (and intentionally, of course) mind-numbing, the rest of the episode takes an equally aggressive approach in the opposite, cartoonish direction. (And those parts get even less focus than they would in most episodes.)"

Alan Sepinwall of Uproxx wrote, "But if 'Safe House' was a familiar type of Brooklyn episode, it was an incredibly well-executed and funny example of that type, layering one ridiculous idea on top of another and managing to give most of the ensemble at least one good spotlight moment even as the bulk of the episode remained focused on Jake, Holt, and Kevin."
