= Anthony Peckham =

South African-born American screenwriter and producer

- Occupations: Screenwriter and producer
- Years active: 1990–present

Anthony Peckham is a South African-born American screenwriter and producer.

== Career ==
Peckham's first screenplay to reach production was 1990's The Assassin. Eleven years later, in 2001, the Michael Douglas thriller Don't Say a Word, Peckham's second screenplay to reach production, premiered.

In 2009, Peckham wrote the screenplays to two high-profile releases: the Clint Eastwood-directed Nelson Mandela biopic Invictus, starring Morgan Freeman and Matt Damon, and Sherlock Holmes, starring Robert Downey Jr. He also rewrote the script for The Book of Eli. In 2013, he was initially signed to write the screenplay for Jason Bourne, set for release in 2016 by Universal Pictures. However, he ended up not writing for the film.
