= The Favor (Brooklyn Nine-Nine) =

- Brooklyn Nine-Nine episode
- Episode no.: Season 5 Episode 11
- Directed by: Victor Nelli Jr.
- Written by: Aeysha Carr
- Cinematography by: Giovani Lampassi
- Editing by: Jason Gill
- Production code: 511
- Original air date: December 12, 2017
- Running time: 21 minutes

Guest appearances
- Paul Adelstein as Seamus Murphy; Mike Mitchell as Kyle Murphy; Carlease Burke as Muriel

Episode chronology
← Previous "Game Night"	Next → "Safe House"
- Brooklyn Nine-Nine season 5

"The Favor" is the 11th episode of the fifth season of the American television police sitcom series Brooklyn Nine-Nine, and the 101st overall episode of the series. The episode was written by Aeysha Carr and directed by Victor Nelli Jr. It aired on Fox in the United States on December 12, 2017, airing back-to-back with the previous episode, "Game Night". The episode features guest appearances from Paul Adelstein, Mike Mitchell, and Carlease Burke.

The show revolves around the fictitious 99th precinct of the New York Police Department in Brooklyn and the officers and detectives that work in the precinct. In the episode, Seamus Murphy meets with Holt to finally ask for the favor he owes him, which involves a party to commit a robbery. While Jake and Boyle meet with Seamus' nephew for information, Amy and Rosa try to file the permit.

According to Nielsen Media Research, the episode was seen by an estimated 1.81 million household viewers and gained a 0.7/3 ratings share among adults aged 18–49. The episode received positive reviews from critics, who praised the writing and ending as highlights.

== Plot ==
Seamus Murphy (Paul Adelstein) meets with Holt (Andre Braugher) to finally ask for the favor he owes him: he requests a permit for a block party that will cover up their planned robbery of $20 million worth of bonds from armored trucks. If he refuses, Seamus will leak the tape where Holt asked the favor and ruin his reputation. Jake (Andy Samberg) and Boyle (Joe Lo Truglio) decide to befriend Seamus' incompetent nephew, Kyle (Mike Mitchell) to learn more about Murphy's plan and stop it without compromising Holt's end of the deal. Unfortunately, they discover that he was expelled from the crime family for losing a Rolls-Royce car.

Meanwhile, Amy (Melissa Fumero) and Rosa (Stephanie Beatriz) try to request a permit for the block party, but they are rejected. When they ask a retired civil servant for help in making the application, she reveals that she deliberately created the form to be logically impossible to file out of spite, shattering Amy's faith in the bureaucracy. Rosa and Amy instead search for loopholes in the system to get the permit. Eventually, they use an obsolete permit that was never officially decertified to get the party permit.

Shortly after returning to the precinct from maternity leave, Gina (Chelsea Peretti) asks Terry (Terry Crews) for a quiet area where she can pump breast milk for her baby, Iggy. Terry sets up an empty office behind records for her to do it, which also happened to be where Hitchcock and Scully took their afternoon naps. The two reveal to Terry shortly afterward that Gina hasn't actually been back there and has instead been leaving the precinct for extended periods of time. Terry confronts Gina about her deception, and she explains that she's been going home to check in on Iggy instead. Terry makes her feel better by explaining how hard it was for him to go to work shortly after his twins were born.

Jake and Boyle manage to retrieve the car from the impound lot and Kyle returns it to Seamus, who welcomes him back into the family. Using a bug on the car keys, the team manages to foil the truck robbery. While this happens, Seamus returns the tape to Holt, ending his obligation. However, Jake discovers from his bug that Seamus blamed Kyle for the failure of the robbery and implies that he is planning to kill him. Humbled by his experience in prison, Jake convinces Holt to take Kyle into protective custody under the pretext of an arrest for unpaid parking tickets. Seamus visits Holt at a diner demanding Kyle's release, and when Holt refuses, Seamus threatens Kevin's (Marc Evan Jackson) life.

== Reception ==
=== Viewers ===
In its original American broadcast, "The Favor" was seen by an estimated 1.81 million household viewers and gained a 0.7/3 ratings share among adults aged 18–49, according to Nielsen Media Research. This was 7% decrease in viewership from the previous episode, which was watched by 1.94 million viewers with a 0.7/3 in the 18-49 demographics. This means that 0.7 percent of all households with televisions watched the episode, while 3 percent of all households watching television at that time watched it. With these ratings, Brooklyn Nine-Nine was the second highest rated show on FOX for the night, behind Lethal Weapon, fifth on its timeslot and twelfth for the night, behind The Mayor, NCIS: New Orleans, Fresh Off the Boat, Lethal Weapon, Chicago Med, Black-ish, Gwen Stefani's You Make It Feel Like Christmas, The Middle, Bull, NCIS, and The Voice.

=== Critical reviews ===
"The Favor" received positive reviews from critics. LaToya Ferguson of The A.V. Club gave the episode a "B+" grade and wrote, "Brooklyn Nine-Nine loves to top itself, and while we're not at the end of the season yet, the Seamus Murphy storyline is a result of that last example of the series trying to top itself. 'The Favor' is still an impressive episode though, specifically in how it takes Holt's moral compass and refusal to use 'loopholes' into account without sacrificing the story quality of the fix (temporary as it ends up being) for the Seamus Murphy problem."

Alan Sepinwall of Uproxx wrote, "'The Favor' in a way has a higher degree of difficulty, because it's trying to present a relatively serious plot idea with long-term ramifications for Holt and the series in the context of a mostly silly story where Jake and Charles try to work around the profound stupidity of Murphy's nephew Kyle."
