= Caitlin Flanagan =

American writer and social critic (born 1961)

- Born: November 14, 1961 (age 64); Berkeley, California, U.S.
- Education: University of Virginia (BA, MA)
- Occupations: Writer, social critic
- Spouse: Rob Hudnut
- Children: 2
- Father: Thomas Flanagan
- Relatives: Andrew Klavan (brother-in-law)

Caitlin Flanagan (born November 14, 1961) is an American writer and social critic. A contributor to The Atlantic from February 2001 through November 2025, she was a finalist for the Pulitzer Prize for Commentary in 2019. She joined The Free Press in April 2026.

Her 2004 piece for The New Yorker was expanded into the 2006 book To Hell with All That: Loving and Loathing Our Inner Housewife. Flanagan also authored the 2012 book Girl Land.

== Early life and education ==
Flanagan was born and raised in the San Francisco Bay Area city of Berkeley, California. She is the daughter of Jean (Parker), a nurse, and Thomas Flanagan, a writer. She has written about having been the victim of an attempted sexual assault by a high school classmate in 1978. She attempted suicide the following year. Her sister Ellen is married to novelist Andrew Klavan.

Flanagan holds a B.A. and an M.A. (1989) in art history from the University of Virginia.

== Career ==
Before becoming a writer, Flanagan was an English teacher and college counselor at Harvard-Westlake School in North Hollywood, a topic she later returned to in her articles about college admissions.

Flanagan's writing and social criticism frequently explore the intersection of public and private, and seek to expose hypocrisies in social narratives of the powerful and the prominent. Flanagan has referred to herself as a Democrat and a liberal. Bitch magazine awarded Flanagan its "Douchebag of the Century" award for her criticism of feminism. Flanagan wrote an article in support of Dianne Feinstein's response to youth climate activists, who were mostly from a 350.org chapter, in which she placed the Green New Deal in "the worlds of magic and make-believe," which was met with objections from the activists and others.

She has written about contradictory currents in the lives of American women, including herself, who discovered later in life a joy in motherhood and social value in domesticity that ran counter to the view of women's domestic lives as oppressive. Some of her essays underscore the emotional rewards and social value of a housewife's role. Consequently, she has been criticized, for instance by Joan Walsh, for misrepresenting her life choices and then condemning other women for not choosing a lifestyle Flanagan herself did not choose either.

In her article "How Serfdom Saved the Women's Movement", Flanagan challenged the narrative of economic and social liberation of women credited to feminism by accusing middle-class women of succeeding at the expense of foreign nannies and illegal workers who replaced them in mothering roles. She argued that these women, while claiming to be virtuous and concerned for others, simultaneously robbed these workers by not paying Social Security taxes.

Flanagan has appeared as a guest on The Colbert Report and Real Time with Bill Maher.

Flanagan's book To Hell with All That: Loving and Loathing Our Inner Housewife was published by Little, Brown in 2006. The book was developed from a New Yorker essay by the same title, as well as other magazine pieces by Flanagan and new writing. In 2012, she published a book about teenage girls, Girl Land.

Flanagan was a finalist for the 2019 Pulitzer Prize for Commentary for several articles that year, including two pieces about Babe.net's story about an anonymous woman's allegation that comedian and actor Aziz Ansari's behavior during a date rose to the level of sexual assault. Flanagan was one of several commentators who argued that the woman who wrote the piece ignored her own agency, not considering her own ability to speak up and leave the situation.

== Personal life ==
Flanagan previously lived in Los Angeles. In 1998 she had twin sons, Patrick and Conor, with her husband, Rob Hudnut. In 2003, when her children were in preschool, she was diagnosed with stage 3 breast cancer, which later metastasized to other parts of her body.

== Bibliography ==
=== Books ===
- To Hell with All That: Loving and Loathing Our Inner Housewife. Little, Brown. 2006. ISBN 978-0316736879.
- Girl Land. Hachette. 2012. ISBN 978-0316065993.
