= My Alibi =

- My Alibi logo with the five principal characters
- Created by: Take180
- Written by: Julie Restivo
- Directed by: Oren Kaplan
- Starring: Alison Brie; Zachary Burr Abel; Adam Chambers; Cyrina Fiallo; Julianna Guill; Marque Richardson; Gabrielle Carteris
- Country of origin: United States
- Original language: English
- No. of episodes: 18

Production
- Producer: Take180

Original release
- Network: Take180; YouTube
- Release: August 18, 2008 – February 20, 2009

Related
- In2ition; Electric Spoofaloo; My Date; I Heart Vampires

My Alibi is a web series produced by Take180 (a subsidiary of The Walt Disney Company). The series, consisting of up to 18 episodes, was one of the first series produced by the site, and one of the most well received. The show, like many on the site, took fan submissions and integrated them into each episode.

The show was picked up for distribution on Abcfamily.com in February 2009.

The series premiered on August 18, 2008, on Take180.com and YouTube, and concluded on February 20, 2009, with each episode averaging around 25,000 views on Take180.com.

== Plot ==
The core plot of My Alibi revolves around a group of students who are sent to the principal (played by Gabrielle Carteris) after a large prank is pulled during the first period of school. All five students were late that day, and are locked in a room together until one of them steps forward and confesses. While they are together, each student relates the story of what they had done that morning along with other related events in their lives, often containing ludicrous twists.

== Cast ==
- Alison Brie as Rebecca Fuller
- Zachary Burr Abel as Jonah Madigan
- Adam Chambers as Cy Woods
- Cyrina Fiallo as Marley Carabello
- Julianna Guill as Scarlet Hauksson
- Marque Richardson as Justin Walker
- Gabrielle Carteris as Principal Tuckerman
