= Don't Say a Word =

2001 American thriller film by Gary Fleder

- Theatrical release poster
- Directed by: Gary Fleder
- Screenplay by: Anthony Peckham; Patrick Smith Kelly
- Based on: Don't Say a Word by Andrew Klavan
- Produced by: Arnon Milchan; Arnold Kopelson; Anne Kopelson
- Starring: Michael Douglas; Sean Bean; Brittany Murphy; Guy Torry; Jennifer Esposito; Famke Janssen; Oliver Platt
- Cinematography: Amir Mokri
- Edited by: Armen Minasian; William Steinkamp
- Music by: Mark Isham
- Production companies: Regency Enterprises; Village Roadshow Pictures; NPV Entertainment; Kopelson Entertainment; New Regency; Furthur Films
- Distributed by: 20th Century Fox
- Release date: September 28, 2001
- Running time: 113 minutes
- Country: United States
- Languages: English; Italian
- Budget: $50 million
- Box office: $100 million

Don't Say a Word is a 2001 American psychological thriller film starring Michael Douglas, Sean Bean, Brittany Murphy, Guy Torry, Jennifer Esposito, Famke Janssen, Skye McCole Bartusiak and Oliver Platt based on the novel Don't Say a Word by Andrew Klavan. It was directed by Gary Fleder and written by Anthony Peckham and Patrick Smith Kelly.

The daughter of psychiatrist Nathan Conrad is kidnapped to force him to break through to Elisabeth Burrows, a PTSD-afflicted young woman, as the abductor demands she reveal a secret number to recover something very valuable.

It was released by 20th Century Fox on September 28, 2001, receiving negative reviews from critics and grossing $100 million against its $50 million budget.

== Plot ==
In 1991, a gang led by Patrick Koster steals a $10-million gem from a Brooklyn bank's safe deposit vault. Two of its members, one of them Russel Maddox, double-cross the others and take off with the gem.

Ten years later, on the day before Thanksgiving, Dr. Nathan Conrad, a private practice psychiatrist known for an ability to connect with teenagers, is asked by Dr. Louis Sachs to examine an 18-year-old girl named Elisabeth Burrows at a psychiatric hospital where they used to be colleagues. Since seeing her father killed in the subway when she was 8, Elisabeth has been in and out of hospital, and she is now in danger of being permanently institutionalized.

Detective Sandra Cassidy investigates two seemingly related murders; one of the victims is Maddox's accomplice, who was tortured before being killed, while the other is a young woman named Sara. Cassidy determines that Patrick is a person of interest in the case.

Having been released from prison two weeks earlier, Patrick, with the remaining members of his gang, breaks into a Manhattan apartment near the one where Nathan lives with his wife, Aggie, and their 8-year-old daughter, Jessie; after killing the elderly woman who lives there, they set up surveillance equipment in the apartment. Patrick kidnaps Jessie to force Nathan to extract a six-digit number from Elisabeth's memory; he makes it clear he can see everything Nathan and Aggie do in their apartment.

Nathan returns to the hospital and quickly realizes Elisabeth is faking many of her symptoms, although she does have PTSD and memory loss; he also learns that Patrick can hear his discussions with Elisabeth. Nathan tells Elisabeth he needs the number to save Jessie. He learns that Louis is involved in the plot, as Patrick also kidnapped Sara, who is Louis's girlfriend, to force him to get the number from Elisabeth. Cassidy visits Louis and tells him Sara has been found dead. As Louis tries unsuccessfully to lie his way out of the situation, Nathan flees the hospital with Elisabeth, narrowly evading Cassidy.

Aggie, who has one leg in a cast, hears Jessie's voice and realizes the kidnappers are in the same building as their apartment. Patrick sends one of his men to kill Aggie while the others leave with Jessie, but Aggie manages to defend herself and kills him. She finds the dead woman and surveillance equipment in the other apartment.

Nathan takes Elisabeth to the place where her father died, and she begins remembering what happened there. It is revealed that Maddox was Elisabeth's father and that he hid the gem in her doll, Mischka. The gang tracked him down to the subway station and, when he refused to say where the gem was, she saw them push him to his death in front of an oncoming subway train. The gang members were arrested, and Elisabeth escaped with Mischka.

Elisabeth tells Nathan that Mischka is on Hart Island, which is the site of a potter's field; he tells Patrick to join them there with Jessie for an exchange. On the island, Elisabeth remembers that there was a number engraved on her father's coffin and that, with the gravediggers' help, she put Mischka in the coffin before he was buried. She now remembers the number, which Patrick realizes is also the number on the grave; he orders his henchmen to exhume the coffin. They find the doll, and the gem is inside it.

Patrick kills one of his henchmen, but before he can shoot Nathan, Cassidy arrives. She kills Patrick's other henchman, but Patrick shoots her. Holding a gun to Patrick's head, Nathan takes the gem from him, throws it into an open mass grave, and kicks Patrick into the grave. When Patrick starts shooting at him, Nathan triggers a collapse of the grave that buries Patrick alive.

Nathan and Jessie reunite with Aggie, and Nathan thanks Cassidy before she is loaded into an ambulance. He invites Elisabeth to join him, Aggie, and Jessie.

== Cast ==
- Michael Douglas as Nathan Conrad, child psychiatrist, Aggie's husband and Jessie's father
- Sean Bean as Patrick Koster, leader of a gang of jewel thieves
- Brittany Murphy as Elisabeth Burrows, a "disturbed" young lady with a number which Patrick wants
- Skye McCole Bartusiak as Jessie Conrad, Nathan and Aggie's daughter who is kidnapped by Patrick
- Guy Torry as Martin Dolen, Koster's henchman
- Jennifer Esposito as Sandra Cassidy, a police officer
- Shawn Doyle as Russel Maddox
- Victor Argo as Sydney Simon
- Aidan Devine as Leon Croft
- Conrad Goode as Max, Koster's henchman
- Paul Schulze as Jake, Koster's henchman
- Lance Reddick as Arnie
- Famke Janssen as Aggie Conrad, Nathan's wife and Jessie's mother
- Oliver Platt as Louis Sachs, Nathan's colleague
- Larry Block as Doorman

== Production ==
In September 2000, it was announced Regency Enterprises and 20th Century Fox would commence production on an adaptation of Don't Say a Word by Andrew Klavan with Gary Fleder set to direct and Michael Douglas to star.

An earlier version of the script did not feature the investigation side-plot set around Detective Sandra Cassidy. Although the film is entirely set in New York, shooting took place in winter 2000 in both New York and Toronto. Due to the film's release nearly three weeks after the September 11 attacks, the filmmakers contemplated delaying the movie, but ultimately decided against it. However, they cut out and replaced shots of the World Trade Center from the edit, such as the opening shot, which now instead shows Brooklyn.

== Soundtrack ==
The film's musical score was composed by Mark Isham and performed by the Hollywood Studio Symphony. The soundtrack was released on CD from Varèse Sarabande that contains eight score selections from various scenes, including Heist, Kidnapped and the horrific events at Subway.

No.	Title	Length
1.	"Heist"	6:02
2.	"Elisabeth"	4:40
3.	"Kidnapped"	4:28
4.	"A Body"	1:37
5.	"Hart Island"	3:38
6.	"Subway"	4:06
7.	"Mishka"	3:13
8.	"A Family"	3:24
Total length:		30:49

== Reception ==
=== Critical response ===
Don't Say a Word received negative reviews from critics. On the review aggregator website Rotten Tomatoes, 24% of 114 critics' reviews are positive, with an average rating of 4.4/10. The website's consensus reads: "Don't Say a Word is slick and competently made, but the movie is routine and stretches believability with many eye rolling moments." Metacritic, which uses a weighted average, assigned the film a score of 38 out of 100, based on 32 critics, indicating "generally unfavorable" reviews. Audiences polled by CinemaScore gave the film an average grade of "B+" on an A+ to F scale.

Roger Ebert of the Chicago Sun-Times gave the film two and a half stars out of four, deeming that "the movie as a whole looks and occasionally plays better than it is" and praising Gary Fleder's "poetic visual touch" as well as Brittany Murphy's and Sky McCole Bartusiak's performances. Conversely, in his review for Empire, Kim Newman found the film bland and thought it "rarely manages to make you forget its blatant silliness". He did however praise the female cast, in particular Famke Janssen.

=== Box office ===
The film collected $17 million in its opening weekend, ranking number one ahead of Zoolander and Hearts in Atlantis. It earned over $100 million worldwide against a budget of $50 million.
