= Gosnell: The Trial of America's Biggest Serial Killer =

2018 film by Nick Searcy

- Theatrical release poster
- Directed by: Nick Searcy
- Screenplay by: Andrew Klavan
- Story by: Phelim McAleer; Ann McElhinney
- Based on: Gosnell: The Untold Story of America's Most Prolific Serial Killer by: Ann McElhinney; Phelim McAleer
- Produced by: Phelim McAleer; Ann McElhinney; Magdalena Segieda; John Sullivan
- Starring: Earl Billings; Dean Cain; Sarah Jane Morris; Michael Beach; Nick Searcy
- Cinematography: Mark Petersen
- Edited by: John Quinn
- Music by: Boris Zelkin
- Production company: Hat Tip Films
- Distributed by: GVN Releasing
- Release date: October 12, 2018
- Running time: 93 minutes
- Country: United States
- Language: English
- Budget: $4 million
- Box office: $3.7 million

Gosnell: The Trial of America's Biggest Serial Killer is a 2018 American drama film based on real life events about Kermit Gosnell, a physician and abortion provider who was convicted of first degree murder in the deaths of three infants born alive, involuntary manslaughter in the death of a patient undergoing an abortion procedure, 21 felony counts of illegal late-term abortion, and 211 counts of violating a 24-hour informed consent law. He was sentenced to life in prison without the possibility of parole.

The film was announced in 2014. Funds for its production were raised via crowdfunding, in which $2.4 million was raised for the creation of the film. The film was directed by Nick Searcy, from a screenplay by Andrew Klavan which was in turn based on the book of the same name written by Irish filmmakers Ann McElhinney and Phelim McAleer. It stars Earl Billings and Dean Cain. After difficulties finding a distributor willing to carry the film and a lawsuit by a judge who objected to his portrayal in the film, the producers signed a distribution deal with GVN Releasing. It was released in approximately 650 theaters across the United States on October 12, 2018.

The film focuses on the police investigation and trial of Kermit Gosnell. The film draws from the book Gosnell: The Untold Story of America's Most Prolific Serial Killer.

== Plot ==
During an investigation into a prescription pill mill run by Dr. Kermit Gosnell, Detective James "Woody" Wood learns that a woman had died at the clinic after being administered narcotics without a doctor on the premises. Woody believes that the woman, Karnamaya Mongar, is a homicide victim who deserves justice. He and his partner, Detective Stark, accompany the Drug Enforcement Administration and Federal Bureau of Investigation on a raid of Gosnell's clinic.

The officers are shocked by conditions inside the clinic, where cats roam and defecate freely and Gosnell is nowhere to be seen although the patients are drugged up for their abortions. As Woody and Stark search the clinic for evidence regarding Karnamaya Mongar, they discover the frozen remains of babies, not fetuses.

Woody engages the support of Assistant District Attorney Lexy McGuire. They uncover a disturbing truth: Gosnell had been performing illegal late-term abortions by having his untrained staff drug patients into a stupor then administer drugs to induce labor. The patients would deliver live babies that Gosnell and his staff would then kill by snipping their spines with surgical scissors. Most shocking of all, Lexy learns that health officials for years deliberately turned a blind eye to the goings-on in Gosnell's clinic.

The trial hinges on the difference between late abortions performed legally and the abortions Gosnell performed. The prosecution focuses on the fact that the babies that Gosnell killed were not aborted while in the womb; they were delivered alive and then killed. Lexy enters a photo of "Baby Boy A," the largest of those babies, into evidence. Gosnell's defense attorney focuses on the gruesome and shocking nature of legally performed late abortions and asserts that Gosnell is a victim of a racist Catholic crusade against a black man performing legal services to minority women.

At the trial's conclusion, the jury finds Gosnell guilty of most of the charges against him, including the murder of Baby Boy A.

== Cast ==
- Dean Cain as Detective James Wood
- Janine Turner as Dr. North
- Sarah Jane Morris as Assistant District Attorney, Lexy McGuire
- Michael Beach as District Attorney, Dan Molinari
- Nick Searcy as Gosnell's defense attorney, Mike Cohan
- Earl Billings as Kermit Gosnell
- Cyrina Fiallo as Molly Mullaney
- Alfonzo Rachel as Detective Stark
- Dominique Deon as Betty Goodwin

== Production ==
=== Development and crowdfunding ===
The film was announced in 2014, less than a year after Gosnell was tried and sentenced to life in prison without the possibility of parole. The filmmakers sought to raise funds for the production of the film through crowdfunding, but encountered resistance from Kickstarter, which the filmmakers said censored the project from their website. According to email exchanges released by McAleer, Kickstarter requested that the phrases "'1000s of babies stabbed to death" and '1000s of babies murdered'...be removed or modified to comply with the spirit of our Community Guidelines." Kickstarter's CEO denied that they censored the project and said the filmmakers blew an editorial exchange out of proportion.

The filmmakers switched to Indiegogo and launched their crowdfunding effort on March 28, 2014, with a goal of $2.1 million, which was reached less than two weeks later on April 9, 2014. It quickly became the highest-funded film on Indiegogo, and is currently one of the highest-funded crowdfunding projects of all time.

=== Casting ===
The film was originally intended to be a made for TV movie, but the filmmakers later decided to make it into a feature film. John Sullivan was announced as the executive producer of the film in December 2014. Nick Searcy was announced as the director of the film in March 2015. Searcy said in a statement, "I am both excited and humbled by the opportunity to have a part in bringing this important American story to the screen. It is a story that many in Hollywood were unwilling to tell, and I am grateful to Ann, Phelim and Magdalena for having the courage to tell it." He also said, "There are three aspects to this story that are fascinating. What happened; why it was allowed to happen; and why no one wanted to talk about it after it happened." Searcy later wrote in a September 2018 op-ed in National Review that he knew taking on a controversial project would cause him to be shunned by some in Hollywood but agreed to direct after reading the script. Searcy says he sought to make a film that "would inform and benefit people on both sides of this issue, no matter how passionate" and that would treat the politics of the case "objectively in an honest and compelling film."

Earl Billings was cast to play Kermit Gosnell, and Dean Cain was cast as Detective James Wood, one of the detectives who investigated Gosnell.

Musician John Ondrasik, also known by his stage name Five for Fighting, recorded a song entitled "The Song of Innocents" for the end credits of the film. The film was shot in Oklahoma rather than the Pennsylvania locations of the crimes.

=== Distribution difficulties ===
Filming was completed in October 2015, and release was expected in 2016, but a distribution deal was not secured until June 2018.

The film faced additional delays when, days before a distribution was set to be announced in June 2017, the Philadelphia judge who presided over Gosnell's trial, Jeffrey Minehart, filed a defamation lawsuit against the filmmakers for $50,000, stating the book and film portrayed Minehart "'as a villain in their story of the righteous versus the wicked' when in fact he's a "former prosecutor with an impeccable reputation for honesty, integrity and fairness.'" The lawsuit was settled out of court and the filmmakers were allowed to resume negotiations with distributors.

== Release ==
The film premiered in Hollywood on October 9, 2018 at the Saban Theatre. It was released in approximately 650 theaters across the United States on October 12, 2018.

=== Marketing ===
A Washington Times article reported that the filmmakers were anticipating a lack of interest from the left-leaning media and that they would instead utilize social media, word-of-mouth, and reaching out to non-media influencers to garner support for the film. Executive producer John Sullivan said their marketing budget would focus on women 35 and older living within 15 miles of a theater showing the film. Sullivan said they were "not naïve" about the increased public conversation about Roe v. Wade sparked by the nomination of Brett Kavanaugh to the United States Supreme Court and that they would "embrace it in a way and have a discussion about it."

The producers attempted to purchase airtime on National Public Radio (NPR) to promote the film, but NPR responded that the announcements could not use the terms "abortionist" or "abortion doctor." The producers declined to agree to NPR's stipulations and thus did not go through with the purchase.

=== Reception ===
Upon its release, the film received only three reviews from large media sources: the Los Angeles Times, Forbes and NBC News. Michael Rechtshaffen, writing for the LA Times, called the film sensationalistic and sanctimonious; he also criticized McElhinney's involvement and the general tone of conservative bias, writing that "the film never loses sight of the choir to which it is plainly preaching." Robin Marty, writing for NBC News, questioned the claim raised by the film's title, as Gosnell was only convicted on three murder charges. She also criticized the film for comparing Gosnell to George Tiller, writing that comparing "an experienced doctor who legally performed third trimester abortions, usually for women victimized by sexual assault or who learned that their child had fatal fetal anomalies, to a man who stabbed live babies in the neck to sever their spinal cords isn't just disingenuous, it's disrespectful (and potentially slanderous). There is no defense of what Gosnell did... there is also no comparison between what he did and what a legitimate, trained abortion provider does — and that is where the film becomes purposefully misleading." The Seattle Times noted in its October 12 new-release coverage that no advance press screening was held for the film, which might explain why there were so few reviews from mainstream media outlets. Other media such as the Washington Times reported without a review, focusing instead on the production's relation to the real-life story on which it is based. On Rotten Tomatoes, the film holds a score of 60%, based on 15 reviews, with an average rating of 6.4/10.

The film's producers alleged that most of the media was refusing to publish reviews to avoid giving it publicity. Columnist George Will said "The critics' boycott of the film continued the journalists' indifference toward Gosnell's trial."

In its first week of release, Gosnell earned $1.8M, ranking 11th highest earner. The second week earned $1M, ranking 15th. The film ran for 10 weeks.

The film was released on DVD in early 2019 on Amazon, Redbox and Netflix.
