= National Board of Review Awards 2012 =

Annual US film awards ceremony

84th NBR Awards
Best Film: Zero Dark Thirty

The 84th National Board of Review Awards, honoring the best in film for 2012, were held on January 8, 2013.

== Top 10 Films ==
Films listed alphabetically except top, which is ranked as Best Film of the Year:

Zero Dark Thirty

- Argo
- Beasts of the Southern Wild
- Django Unchained
- Les Misérables
- Lincoln
- Looper
- The Perks of Being a Wallflower
- Promised Land
- Silver Linings Playbook

== Winners ==
Best Film:

- Zero Dark Thirty

Best Director:

- Kathryn Bigelow – Zero Dark Thirty

Best Actor:

- Bradley Cooper – Silver Linings Playbook

Best Actress:

- Jessica Chastain – Zero Dark Thirty

Best Supporting Actor:

- Leonardo DiCaprio – Django Unchained

Best Supporting Actress:

- Ann Dowd – Compliance

Best Original Screenplay:

- Rian Johnson – Looper

Best Adapted Screenplay:

- David O. Russell – Silver Linings Playbook

Best Animated Feature:

- Wreck-It Ralph

Best Foreign Language Film:

- Amour

Best Documentary:

- Searching for Sugar Man

Best Ensemble:

- Les Misérables

Breakthrough Actor:

- Tom Holland – The Impossible

Breakthrough Actress:

- Quvenzhané Wallis – Beasts of the Southern Wild

Best Directorial Debut:

- Benh Zeitlin – Beasts of the Southern Wild

Special Achievement in Filmmaking:

- Ben Affleck – Argo

William K. Everson Film History Award:

- 50 Years of Bond Films

Spotlight Award:

- John Goodman, for Argo, Flight, ParaNorman, Trouble with the Curve

NBR Freedom of Expression:

- The Central Park Five
- Promised Land

== Top Foreign Films ==
Amour

- Barbara
- The Intouchables
- The Kid with a Bike
- No
- War Witch

== Top Documentaries ==
Searching for Sugar Man

- Ai Weiwei: Never Sorry
- Detropia
- The Gatekeepers
- The Invisible War
- Only the Young

== Top Independent Films ==
- Arbitrage
- Bernie
- Compliance
- End of Watch
- Hello I Must Be Going
- Little Birds
- Moonrise Kingdom
- On the Road
- Quartet
- Sleepwalk with Me
