= Empire of Lies =

2008 novel

- Author: Andrew Klavan
- Language: English
- Genre: Thriller novel
- Publisher: Houghton Mifflin Harcourt
- Publication date: July 1, 2008
- Publication place: United States
- Media type: Print (hardback & paperback)
- Pages: 400
- ISBN: 978-0-15-101223-7

Empire of Lies is a 2008 thriller novel written by screenwriter and Edgar-winner Andrew Klavan.

== Plot ==
The book is a thriller in which the protagonist and narrator Jason Harrow confronts both the death of his mentally-ill mother and the consequences of his past life. In so doing, he comes to believe he has stumbled on evidence of an Islamist terrorist plot in New York City, though he often doubts whether the plot is real or he is going insane like his mother. Although he repeatedly struggles with his own moral weaknesses, Harrow is a politically conservative Christian, and his efforts to expose the suspected plot bring him into conflict with the police, entertainment industry, academia, and the news media—the "Empire of Lies" in the book's title.

== Reception ==
The novel received mixed reviews due to its controversial subject matter, namely an Islamic terrorist threat on the USA.

An Associated Press reviewer stated that "Klavan occupies the portion of the political spectrum commonly known as right-wing crackpot". Author Bruce DeSilva, for Reading Eagle, was similarly critical, stated that he found protagonist Harrow to be a "sanctimonious jerk", finding "several long, tedious passages" the cause for what "finally does this one in"; concluding "crime novel stops being entertaining when the author uses it as a platform for political diatribes".

Kirkus Reviews were somewhat less critical of the novel stating that "Klavan gets a C-minus for plausibility, an A for thrills", referring to what they found to be a "series of monumental coincidences" in the formation of the book's story.

The Washington Times reviewer, James E. Person Jr., stated "Empire of Lies is a can't-put-it-down thriller for the thinking person", and opining that "Klavan embraces (but does not quote) [a] quote attributed to George Orwell: "In an age of universal deceit, telling the truth is a revolutionary act"." Publishers Weekly found it to be a "wickedly satiric thriller" which "builds to an explosive climax".
