= Clean Comedians =

- Company type: Privately held company
- Industry: Entertainment and speakers bureau
- Founded: Los Angeles, California 1990
- Founder: Adam Christing
- Headquarters: La Mirada, California, United States
- Website: cleancomedians.com

Clean Comedians is a comedy booking agency, entertainment bureau, speakers bureau, and event-planning company that represents comedians, speakers, magicians, jugglers, emcees and entertainers who avoid using profanity and other objectionable material in their performances and speeches. The company was founded in Los Angeles, California in 1990 by comedian and author Adam Christing. Clean Comedians is known throughout the United States and has been profiled in publications including The New York Times, The Washington Post, Los Angeles Times, Los Angeles Daily News, Southwest Airlines Spirit Magazine, and Chicago Tribune. The organization works with over 100 performers and operates under the motto "It Doesn't Have to Be Filthy to Be Funny." The company provides meeting and event planners with "Laughter You Can Trust."

== Company history ==
Clean Comedians was founded in 1990 largely as an alternative to comics and entertainers like Andrew Dice Clay and Howard Stern, who used profanity extensively in their performances. Adam Christing noticed the trend of more vulgar comedians and felt that there would be a sizable market for curse-free performers. He drafted the "10 Commandments of Comedy," which were essentially "clean" guidelines for performers offered to meeting and event planners. He would later devise the "NO G.R.O.S.S." pledge, which stated that performers could not incorporate gender bashing, racist jabs, obscenity, sexual innuendo, or swearing into their acts. These guidelines must be followed by entertainers featured on the Clean Comedians roster.

The company started out with a small number of performers including Christing, Cary Trivanovich, Scott Wood, Guy Owen, Jason Chase, and impersonator Steve Bridges. The company made approximately $100,000 in its first year of operation and approximately $200,000 in its second. The entertainers and variety artists mostly performed (and continue to perform) at corporate events, associations, sales meetings, and large church events.

In 1996, the company was granted a federal trademark for the name "Clean Comedians" for recordings and for booking live performances.

By 1999, the company had an active roster of 49 performers and several thousand booking clients. They gave over 640 performances in that year. In addition to standard performances, Clean Comedians has also provided fundraising opportunities for many schools and non-profit organizations.

In 2005, Christing sold Clean Comedians to Ford Entertainment to pursue other entrepreneurial ventures. He returned as owner and president of the company in 2012.

The company has also booked shows and appearances for conventions and events at major corporations like Canon, Johnson & Johnson, Insperity, and HP.
