= Game Night (Brooklyn Nine-Nine) =

- Brooklyn Nine-Nine episode
- Episode no.: Season 5 Episode 10
- Directed by: Tristram Shapeero
- Written by: Justin Noble; Carly Hallam Tosh
- Cinematography by: Giovani Lampassi
- Editing by: Jeremy Reuben
- Production code: 510
- Original air date: December 12, 2017
- Running time: 21 minutes

Guest appearances
- Danny Trejo as Oscar Diaz; Olga Merediz as Julia Diaz; Paul Scheer as Devin Cathertaur

Episode chronology
← Previous "99"	Next → "The Favor"
- Brooklyn Nine-Nine season 5

"Game Night" is the 10th episode of the fifth season of the American television police sitcom series Brooklyn Nine-Nine, and the 100th overall episode of the series. The episode was written by Justin Noble & Carly Hallam Tosh and directed by Tristram Shapeero. It aired on Fox in the United States on December 12, 2017, airing back-to-back with the next episode, "The Favor". The episode features guest appearances from Danny Trejo, Olga Merediz, and Paul Scheer.

The show revolves around the fictitious 99th precinct of the New York Police Department in Brooklyn and the officers and detectives that work in the precinct. In the episode, Rosa asks Jake for help in telling her parents that she's bisexual by going to dinner and then to a game night with them, although not everything goes as planned. Meanwhile, the precinct turns to Gina for help when the Cyber Crimes division is using up all their bandwidth, resulting in slow internet. The episode marks Chelsea Peretti's return to the show after a 10-episode absence.

According to Nielsen Media Research, the episode was seen by an estimated 1.81 million household viewers and gained a 0.7/3 ratings share among adults aged 18–49. The episode received acclaim from critics, who praised Stephanie Beatriz's performance, Trejo's guest performance, character development, writing and handling of the subject matter.

== Plot ==
During a briefing, Rosa (Stephanie Beatriz) comes out to the precinct as bisexual. She then tells Jake (Andy Samberg) that she hasn't told her parents about it and asks for help. To thank Jake for his help, Rosa invites him to dinner at a restaurant. Nevertheless, Jake does not know that Rosa's parents, Oscar (Danny Trejo) and Julia (Olga Merediz), will also be there.

At the dinner, Rosa and Jake have to feign being in a relationship but their cover is blown when Jake's fiancée, Amy (Melissa Fumero) calls him. Rosa's parents, however, are relieved as they would rather have her be someone's mistress than bisexual, causing her to storm off. Later, she and Jake visit her parents for a game night to discuss again. Everything goes fine but her parents continue disapproving her sexuality, deeming it a "phase", angering her. The next day, Oscar visits her and apologizes for his behavior, telling her he loves her and accepts her for who she is, but Julia will take time to accept it and as such, their game nights might be postponed. The precinct then decides to make a weekly game night at Rosa's apartment.

Meanwhile, the Cyber Crimes division is moved next to the 99th precinct and is using up all their bandwidth, causing problems with the internet connection. After a few failed attempts to persuade the division and seeing no other choice, the precinct calls on Gina (Chelsea Peretti) for help, for which she intimidates the division leader Devin (Paul Scheer) to return the bandwidth. Gina explains to the precinct that she's not coming back as she wants to begin a business to raise her daughter. However, after being touched by Amy and Boyle's (Joe Lo Truglio) good-bye speech, she decides to return to the Nine-Nine while continuing to work on her side business.

== Reception ==
=== Viewers ===
In its original American broadcast, "Game Night" was seen by an estimated 1.81 million household viewers and gained a 0.7/3 ratings share among adults aged 18–49, according to Nielsen Media Research. This was 7% decrease in viewership from the previous episode, which was watched by 1.94 million viewers with a 0.7/3 in the 18-49 demographics. This means that 0.7 percent of all households with televisions watched the episode, while 3 percent of all households watching television at that time watched it. With these ratings, Brooklyn Nine-Nine was the second highest rated show on FOX for the night, behind Lethal Weapon, fifth on its timeslot and twelfth for the night, behind The Mayor, NCIS: New Orleans, Fresh Off the Boat, Lethal Weapon, Chicago Med, Black-ish, Gwen Stefani's You Make It Feel Like Christmas, The Middle, Bull, NCIS, and The Voice.

=== Critical reviews ===
"Game Night" received acclaim from critics. LaToya Ferguson of The A.V. Club gave the episode an "A" grade and wrote, "Brooklyn Nine-Nine understandably treated its 99th episode like most shows treat their 100th episode. So in theory, the 100th episode would just be another episode of the series. Nothing more, nothing less. But that doesn't take into account that even a 'regular' episode of Brooklyn Nine-Nine can be special. And that's exactly what 'Game Night' is. Comparing it to the episode's namesake, while the 100th episode of Brooklyn Nine-Nine has perhaps been treated as low-key as a typical game night, it ends up being just as poignant as the episode's own closing game night."

Alan Sepinwall of Uproxx wrote, "'Game Night' feels more special, because, like the Terry racial profiling episode from last season, it feels very personal in a way the series doesn't often — Stephanie Beatriz came out as bi not too long ago (and was, like Terry Crews in 'Moo Moo,' terrific here) — and because, like the Terry episode, it never attempts to wrap things up neatly. Rosa's dad (Danny Trejo, excellent in a comic role that turned dramatic in a hurry) eventually comes around, but you can tell he still doesn't understand who his daughter really is, and Mrs. Diaz is still keeping her distance."
