= Thomas Flanagan (writer) =

American writer and academic

- Born: Thomas Bonner Flanagan; November 5, 1923; Greenwich, Connecticut, U.S.
- Died: March 21, 2002 (aged 78); Berkeley, California, U.S.
- Education: Amherst College (BA); Columbia University (MA, PhD)
- Occupations: professor novelist
- Spouse: Jane Parker Flanagan
- Children: 2, including Caitlin Flanagan
- Relatives: Andrew Klavan (son-in-law)

Thomas Bonner Flanagan (November 5, 1923 – March 21, 2002) was an American university professor at the University of California at Berkeley and a novelist.

== Biography ==
Flanagan was born in 1923 in Greenwich, Connecticut, to a homemaker mother and a dentist father. All of his grandparents had come to the United States from County Fermanagh, Ireland. He served in the United States Army during World War II. He graduated from Amherst College in 1945. He received his Master of Arts and Doctor of Philosophy degrees from Columbia University. From 1960 to 1978 he was a professor of English literature at the University of California at Berkeley, specializing in Irish literature. He was a tenured full professor in the English department at Stony Brook University until his retirement.

Flanagan was also a successful novelist. His first novel, The Year of the French, won the National Book Critics Award for fiction in 1979 and was adapted into a TV series, which was broadcast in Ireland in 1982.

== Personal life ==
In 1949, he married Jane Parker, a nurse; they had two children, writer Caitlin Flanagan and Ellen Flanagan Klavan. His son-in-law is writer Andrew Klavan. He and his wife spent much of their time in Ireland. They lived in East Setauket, Long Island.

He died of a heart attack on March 21, 2002, at the age of 78 in Berkeley.

Flanagan attended Greenwich High School in Connecticut, where he befriended Truman Capote, who transferred to Greenwich High after his mother and stepfather relocated to Greenwich in 1939. Thomas and Truman appeared in Greenwich High's production of Hamlet, where they portrayed executioners.

== Works ==
=== Novels ===
- The Year of the French (1979); ISBN 9781590171080 (2004)
- The Tenants of Time (1988)
- The End of the Hunt (1995)

=== Non-fiction ===
- The Irish Novelists 1800–1850 (1958)

== Legacy ==
The Archives and Special Collections at Amherst College holds his papers.

== Sources ==
- Thomas Flanagan on Irish writers website page
