= Adam Christing =

American comedian

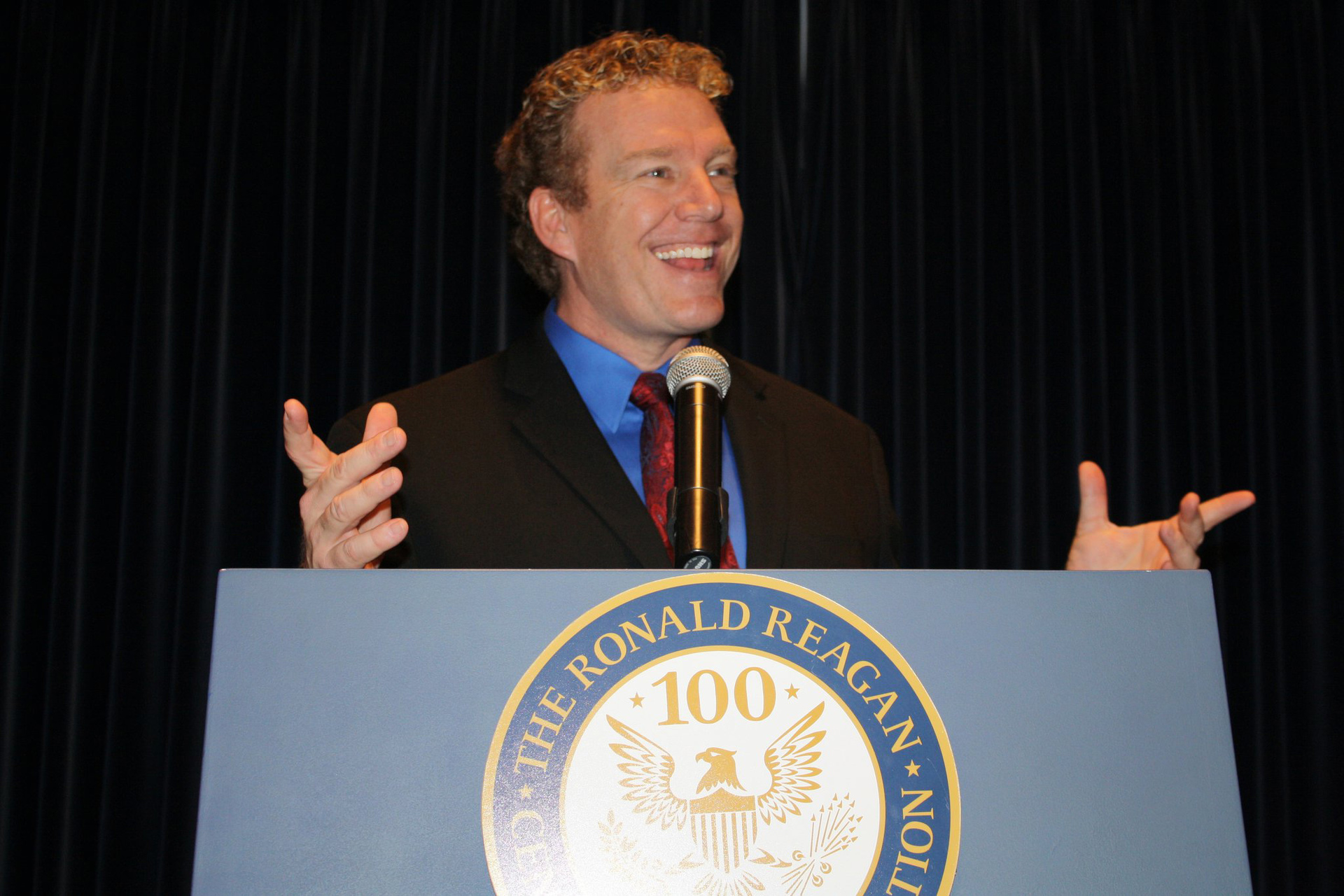
- Christing Emceeing at the Reagan Library
- Born: Los Angeles, California
- Education: Biola University (B.A.)
- Occupations: Comedian; Speaker/master of ceremonies Author; Director
- Known for: Founder of Clean Comedians
- Website: adamchristing.com

Adam Christing is an American comedian, author, and motivational speaker from La Mirada, California. He is the founder and president of Clean Comedians, an organization composed of comedians, speakers, and entertainers who refrain from using objectionable material and profanity during their performances.

Christing has written three books: Comedy Comes Clean, Comedy Comes Clean 2, and Your Life is a Joke. He also wrote, produced, and directed the 2008 mockumentary Change Your Life! He has appeared on numerous radio and television programs including Entertainment Tonight, and NBC Nightly News. He has appeared in print publications including Fortune, USA Today, and The New York Times.

== Early life and education ==
Christing was born in Los Angeles, California and has lived in Southern California for much of his life. He began performing magic tricks at the age of 9 and gained membership into Hollywood's Magic Castle at age 17.

He earned a bachelor's degree in public speaking from Biola University in Los Angeles, and was named to the university's Alumni Hall of Fame.

In 1987, Christing was mentioned in a Los Angeles Times piece for successfully preventing a theft.

The genesis of Christing's idea for Clean Comedians is briefly profiled in the book Life Is a Series of Presentations.

== Career ==
Christing founded Clean Comedians in 1990. as a response to the rise in prominence of frequently profane comedians like Andrew Dice Clay and Howard Stern. By 1992, the group consisted of around 20 entertainers, including impersonator and fellow Biola University alumnus Steve Bridges. Members of the group primarily performed (and continue to perform) for corporate events, association gatherings, religious groups, educational and fundraising events.

Christing was able to capitalize on the "clean and funny" image by releasing two books: Comedy Comes Clean in 1996 and Comedy Comes Clean 2 in 1997, both published by Three Rivers Press.

In 2005, Christing turned his attention to self-help and life coaching by selling Clean Comedians and founding TheMeaningOfLife.com. The website offered various "empowerment" DVDs and life coaching sessions designed to help people engage in a spiritual "life transformation." The site also hosted a contest that awarded $10,000 to the entrant who could provide the "most profound" statement of the meaning of life in under 25 words.

In 2008, Christing produced, wrote, and directed a mockumentary-style comedy film called Change Your Life!, starring Tony Plana. In 2012, he returned to the helm of Clean Comedians.

In 2013, he released Your Life Is A Joke: 12 Ways to Go from Ha Ha to AHA!, a humorous self-help book.

Christing has been named among the top five "after-dinner" speakers in the United States and was profiled in a cover story of The Funny Paper, a magazine that showcases wholesome performing artists. He is often hired as a master of ceremonies for non-profit groups and companies like Johnson & Johnson, Choice Hotels, and The Ritz Carlton. Since making Change Your Life!, Christing has written and directed a historical documentary and a number of identity and parody videos for companies like HP and Insperity. He has given over 4,000 live speeches and performances throughout his career.

=== Filmography ===
- 2008, Change Your Life!, writer and producer

=== Bibliography ===
| Title | Publication date | ISBN, publisher |
|---|---|---|
| Comedy Comes Clean | August 20, 1996 | ISBN 9780517887363, Three Rivers Press |
| Comedy Comes Clean 2 | July 29, 1997 | ISBN 9780517887370, Three Rivers Press |
| Your Life is a Joke | November 21, 2013 | ISBN 9780989930314, Markin Books |
