= Andrew Klavan =

American novelist and political commentator (born 1954)

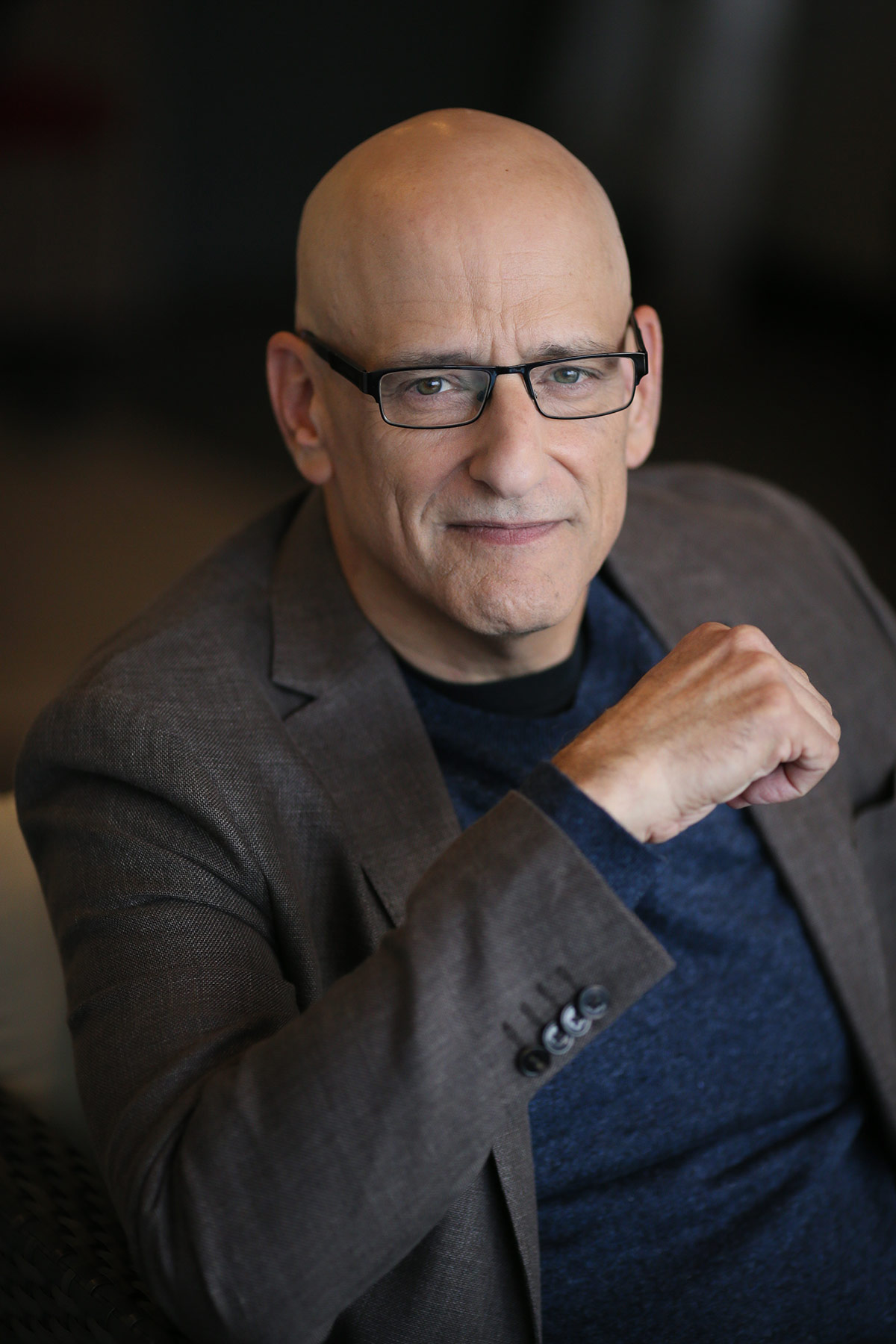
- Klavan in 2018
- Born: July 13, 1954 (age 72); New York City, U.S.
- Education: University of California, Berkeley (BA)
- Occupations: Writer; political commentator
- Spouse: Ellen Flanagan (m. 1980)
- Children: 2
- Relatives: Thomas Flanagan (father-in-law); Caitlin Flanagan (sister-in-law)
- Writing career
- Pen name: Keith Peterson
- Genres: Mystery; thriller; crime
- Website: www.andrewklavan.com

Andrew Klavan (/ˈkleɪvən/; born July 13, 1954) is an American novelist, author and conservative political commentator. He has also worked in film and as an essayist and video satirist. He is also known for being a political commentator and hosts The Andrew Klavan Show podcast on the conservative site The Daily Wire. Born in New York City, Klavan was raised on Long Island and attended college at the University of California at Berkeley. He published his first novel, Face of the Earth, in 1977, and found critical recognition when The Rain won the Edgar Award for best new paperback. He lives in Virginia.

== Early life and education ==
Klavan was born to a secular Jewish family in New York City and grew up in Great Neck, Long Island, as one of four sons born to father Gene Klavan, a New York disc jockey, and mother Phyllis, a homemaker. He graduated from the University of California, Berkeley, with a degree in English literature. He worked as a radio and newspaper reporter and a radio news writer before becoming a full-time writer.

== Career ==
Klavan began his crime-writing career using the pseudonym Keith Peterson. Under that name he wrote The John Wells book series, a mystery series about a crime-solving newspaper reporter, and The Scarred Man, his first novel of psychological suspense.

Under his own name, Klavan has written crime novels, and the Homelanders series for young adults. His novels have been translated around the world. He has won two Edgar Awards from the Mystery Writers of America, the Thumping Good Read Award from W.H. Smith, and been nominated for Anthony Awards and the International Thriller Writers award.

True Crime was filmed by Clint Eastwood in 1999. Don't Say a Word was filmed starring Michael Douglas in 2001. Donald Cammell's 1987 White of the Eye was based on the novel Mrs. White, which Klavan co-wrote under the pseudonym Margaret Tracy with his brother, playwright Laurence Klavan. Andrew wrote the screenplay for the 1990 Michael Caine film A Shock to the System, based on the novel by Simon Brett, and for the 2008 horror film One Missed Call, which starred Shannyn Sossamon and Ed Burns. He also wrote the screenplay for the movie-in-an-app Haunting Melissa and its sequel, Haunting Melissa 2: Dark Hearts. He scripted the 2018 film Gosnell: The Trial of America's Biggest Serial Killer, a crime film based on the Kermit Gosnell trial.

Klavan has produced several satirical online video series including Klavan on the Culture for PJ Media, The Revolting Truth for TruthRevolt, and A Very Serious Commentary for Glenn Beck's Blaze Media. He currently does a weekly podcast for the Daily Wire called the Andrew Klavan Show.

The Great Good Thing: A Secular Jew Comes to Faith in Christ, Klavan's first non-fiction book, was published in 2016. It is a memoir of his spiritual journey from secular Judaism and agnosticism to Christianity.

Klavan's 36th novel, When Christmas Comes, was published in 2021 and features themes of Christmas, tradition, and murder. It is a thriller novel situated in an idyllic town.

== Political views ==
After graduating from Berkeley, Klavan began his writing career as a liberal. He became a conservative during the Reagan administration. He has both praised and criticized US president Donald Trump. Klavan supports gun rights and freedom of speech.

== Books ==
=== Standalone books ===
- Face of the Earth (1977)
- Agnes Mallory (1985)
- Mrs. White (1987) (as Margaret Tracy, with Laurence Klavan)
- There Fell a Shadow (1988) (as Keith Peterson)
- The Rain (1988) (as Keith Peterson)
- Darling Clementine (1988)
- The Trapdoor (1988) (as Keith Peterson)
- Son of Man (1988)
- The Scarred Man (1989) (as Keith Peterson)
- Rough Justice (1989) (as Keith Peterson)
- Don't Say a Word (1991)
- The Animal Hour (1992)
- Corruption (1993)
- True Crime (1995)
- Suicide (1995)
- The Uncanny (1998)
- Hunting Down Amanda (1999)
- Man and Wife (2001)
- Dynamite Road (2003)
- Shotgun Alley (2004)
- Damnation Street (2006)
- Empire of Lies (2008)
- The Identity Man (2010)
- Crazy Dangerous (2012) ISBN 9781595547934
- If We Survive (2012) ISBN 9781595547965
- Nightmare City (2013) ISBN 9781595547972
- A Killer in the Wind (2013) ISBN 9780802122254
- Werewolf Cop (2016) ISBN 9781605989730
- The Great Good Thing: A Secular Jew Comes to Faith in Christ (2016)
- The Truth and Beauty (2022)
- The Kingdom of Cain: Finding God in the Literature of Darkness (2025)

=== The Homelanders series ===
- The Homelanders: The Last Thing I Remember (2009)
- The Homelanders: The Long Way Home (2010)
- The Homelanders: The Truth of the Matter (2010)
- The Homelanders: The Final Hour (2011)

=== The Mindwar trilogy ===
- Mindwar (2014)
- Hostage Run (2016)
- Game Over (2016)

=== The Another Kingdom trilogy ===
- Another Kingdom (2019)
- The Nightmare Feast (2020)
- The Emperor's Sword (2021)

=== The Cameron Winter Series ===
- When Christmas Comes (2021) ISBN 978-1-61316240-8
- A Strange Habit of Mind (2022) ISBN 978-1-61316351-1
- The House of Love and Death (2023) ISBN 978-1-61316446-4
- A Woman Underground (2024) ISBN 978-1-61316553-9
- After That, the Dark (2025) ISBN 978-1-61316686-4

== Audio plays ==
- Another Kingdom: Season 1 (2017)
- Another Kingdom: Season 2 (2018)
- Another Kingdom: Season 3 (2019)

== Filmography ==
Year	Title	Notes
1987	White of the Eye	Based on Mrs. White
1990	A Shock to the System	Screenplay
1999	True Crime	Based on True Crime
2001	Don't Say a Word	Based on Don't Say a Word
2008	One Missed Call	Screenplay
2013	N.Y.C. Underground	Screenplay
2018	Gosnell: The Trial of America's Biggest Serial Killer	Screenplay
2023	Lady Ballers	Cameo appearance

== Accolades ==
Klavan's book Mrs. White, which he wrote under the pen-name Margaret Tracy, won the 1984 Edgar Award for Best Paperback Original. In 1989, his novel Trapdoor was nominated in the Best Paperback Original category. In 1990, he won the Edgar Award in the Best Paperback Original category for The Rain, as well as a nomination at the 1990 Anthony Awards for Rough Justice in the paperback category. Klavan was nominated for an Edgar Award for Best Novel in 1992 for his first novel, Don't Say a Word. He received an Anthony Awards nomination at the 1996 ceremony for True Crime in the Best Novel category.

== Personal life ==
In 1980, he married Ellen Flanagan, daughter of Thomas Flanagan and sister of Caitlin Flanagan. They have two children and live in Virginia.

Klavan converted to Christianity at the age of 49 and was baptized privately. Initially he attended the Episcopal Church, but has since left for the Anglican Catholic Church.
