= Alison Brie =

American actress and writer (born 1982)

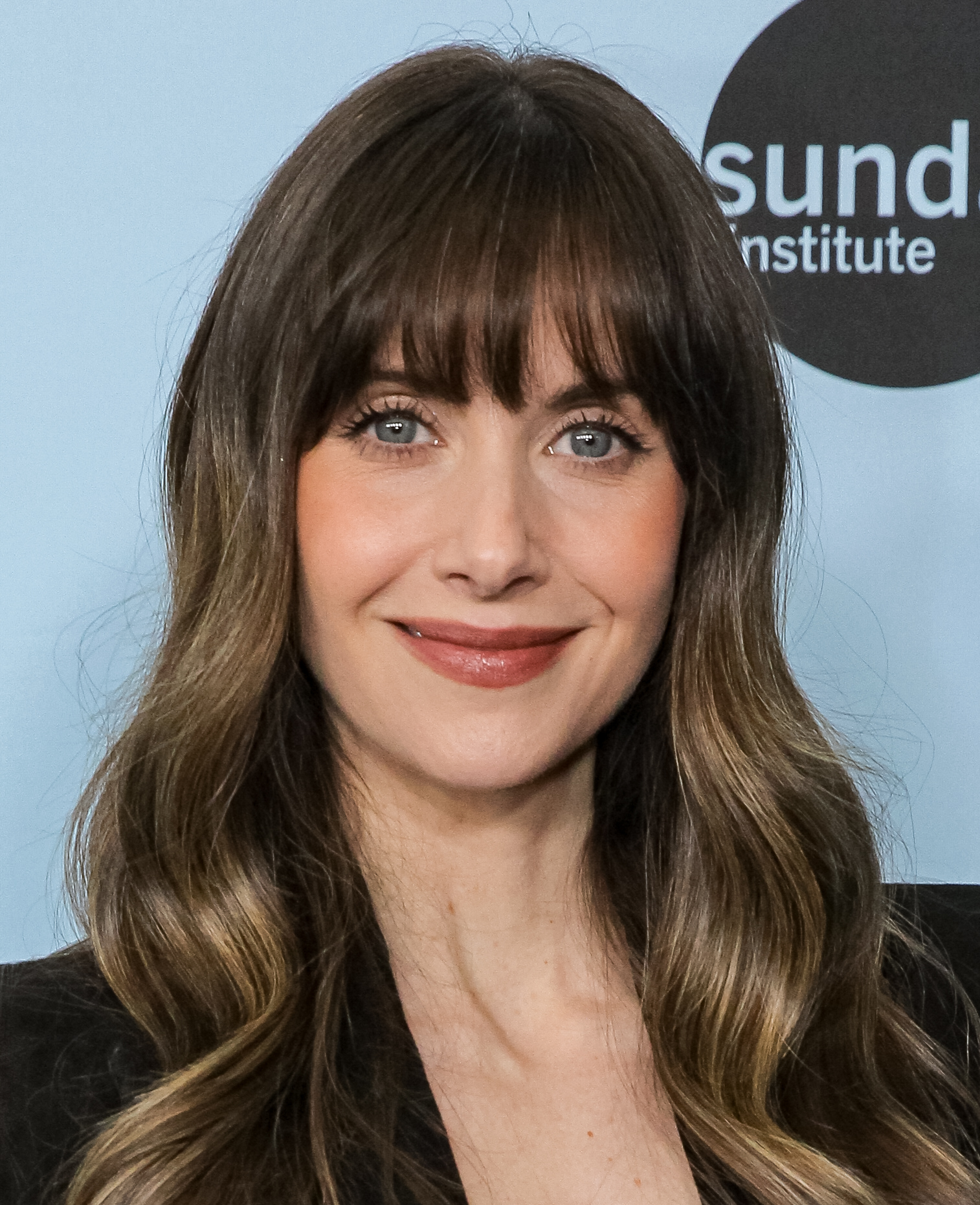
- Brie in 2025
- Born: Alison Brie Schermerhorn; December 29, 1982 (age 43); Los Angeles, California, U.S.
- Education: California Institute of the Arts (BFA)
- Occupations: Actress; producer; writer
- Years active: 2004–present
- Spouse: Dave Franco (m. 2017)
- Relatives: James Franco (brother-in-law); Tom Franco (brother-in-law)

Alison Brie Schermerhorn (born December 29, 1982) is an American actress, producer, and writer. Her accolades include a Screen Actors Guild Award, as well as nominations for four Critics' Choice Awards and two Golden Globe Awards.

Brie gained recognition for playing Trudy Campbell in the drama series Mad Men (2007–2015) and for her breakthrough role as Annie Edison in the sitcom Community (2009–2015). She then voiced Diane Nguyen in the animated comedy series BoJack Horseman (2014–2020) and garnered critical acclaim for portraying Ruth Wilder in the comedy drama series GLOW (2017–2019).

Brie has appeared in films such as Scream 4 (2011), The Five-Year Engagement (2012), The Lego Movie franchise (2014–2019), Get Hard (2015), Sleeping with Other People (2015), How to Be Single (2016), The Post (2017), The Little Hours (2017), Promising Young Woman (2020), Happiest Season (2020), and Together (2025). She has also expanded into filmmaking, having written, produced, and starred in Horse Girl (2020), Spin Me Round (2022), and Somebody I Used to Know (2023).

== Early life ==
Alison Brie Schermerhorn was born on December 29, 1982, in Hollywood, Los Angeles, California. Her father is a musician and freelance entertainment reporter. Her mother works at Para los Niños ("For the Children"), a non-profit childcare agency. She has a sister named Lauren. Brie's mother is Jewish. Her father was raised Catholic, and has Dutch, English, and Scottish ancestry. While being raised by her divorced parents, she occasionally attended a "Christian-Hindu hybrid church" called the Self-Realization Fellowship with her father, while her mother "would always make sure we knew we were Jewish". She graduated from South Pasadena High School in 2001. The summer between high school and college, she worked as a clown named Sunny at children's birthday parties.

She graduated from the California Institute of the Arts with a bachelor's degree in theater in 2005. Her studies included a year at the Royal Conservatoire of Scotland in Glasgow.

== Career ==
=== 2000s and 2010s ===
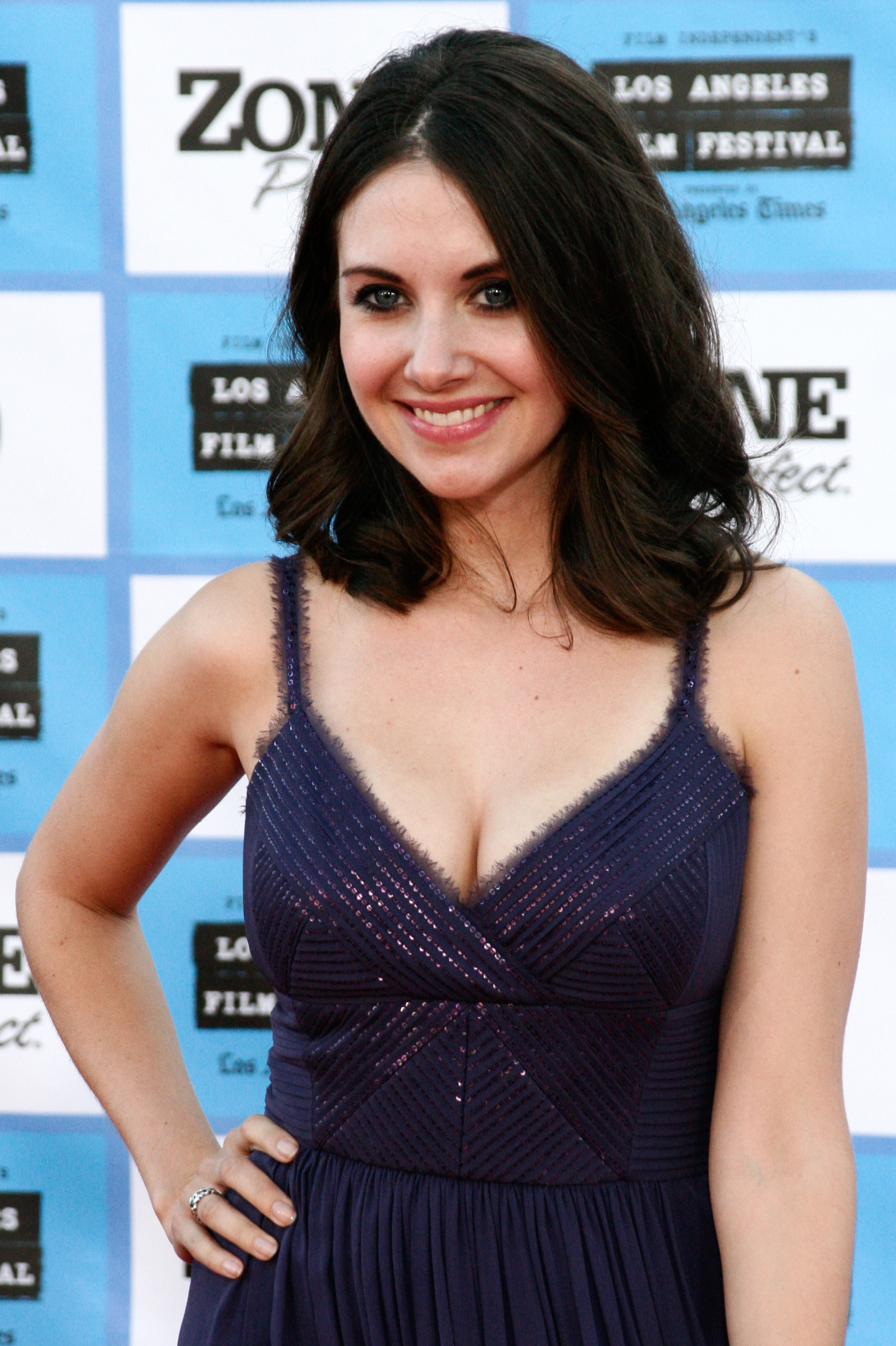
Brie at the premiere of Public Enemies in 2009.

Brie began acting onstage at the Jewish Community Center in Southern California. Her first television role came in 2006 as Nina, a novice hairdresser, on the Disney Channel sitcom Hannah Montana. She received further recognition as Trudy Campbell in the AMC period drama series Mad Men (2007–2015), which won her the Screen Actors Guild Award for Outstanding Performance by an Ensemble in a Drama Series. She went on to star in the web series My Alibi, which aired from 2008 to 2009.

From 2009 to 2015, she portrayed Annie Edison on the NBC/Yahoo! View sitcom Community, for which she was nominated for the Critics' Choice Television Award for Best Supporting Actress in a Comedy Series and won an Entertainment Weekly Award from two nominations. In April 2010, she co-hosted an episode of Attack of the Show! (and again in March 2011) and appeared in a segment on Web Soup. She appeared in the 2010 comedy film Montana Amazon. Brie made Maxim magazine's 2010 Hot 100 list at number 99 and appeared at number 49 in their 2011 list. She was voted the 57th Sexiest Woman in the World by FHM readers in 2013. She was voted the second-most desirable woman in the world by AskMen readers in 2014.

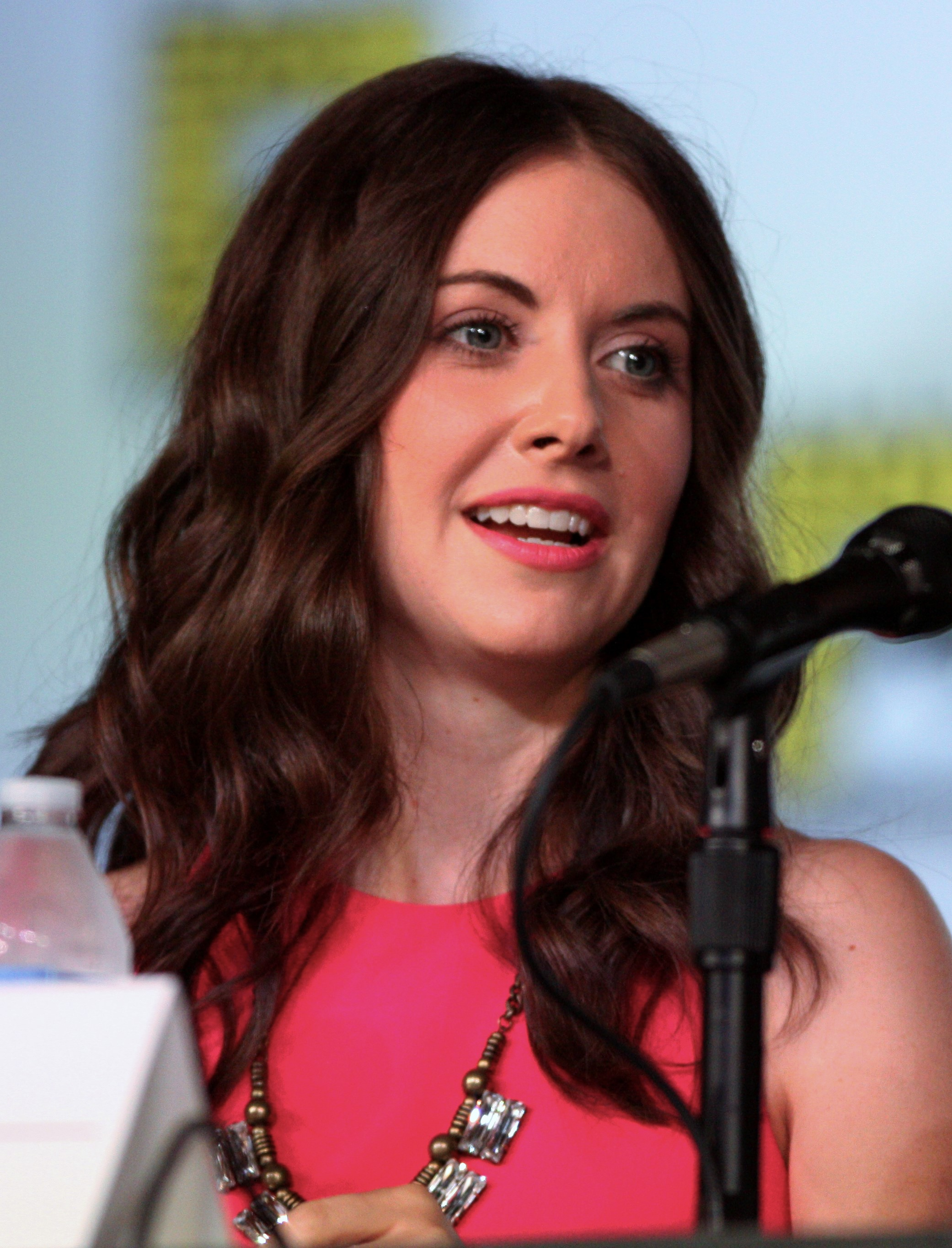
Brie at the 2012 San Diego Comic-Con

Brie had several major film roles, including as Rebecca Walters, Sidney Prescott's assistant, in the slasher horror film Scream 4 (2011), and Suzie Barnes in the romantic comedy film The Five-Year Engagement (2012). She voiced Princess Unikitty in the animated comedy film The Lego Movie (2014), and voiced a character in an episode of the animated series American Dad!, which aired during their eighth season.

In June 2014, Brie joined the cast of the Netflix series BoJack Horseman, which debuted on August 22. She has since voiced a variety of characters, including main character Diane Nguyen and recurring character Vincent Adultman. She appeared on Lip Sync Battle and won against Will Arnett with performances of "Shoop" by Salt-N-Pepa and "Bang Bang" by Jessie J, Ariana Grande, and Nicki Minaj.

In 2015, she starred with Jason Sudeikis in Leslye Headland's romantic comedy film Sleeping with Other People, and played Will Ferrell's character's fiancée in the comedy film Get Hard. In 2016, she starred as Lucy in the romantic comedy film How to Be Single, and as Martha Dunstable in Julian Fellowes' adaptation of Anthony Trollope's Dr. Thorne for television.

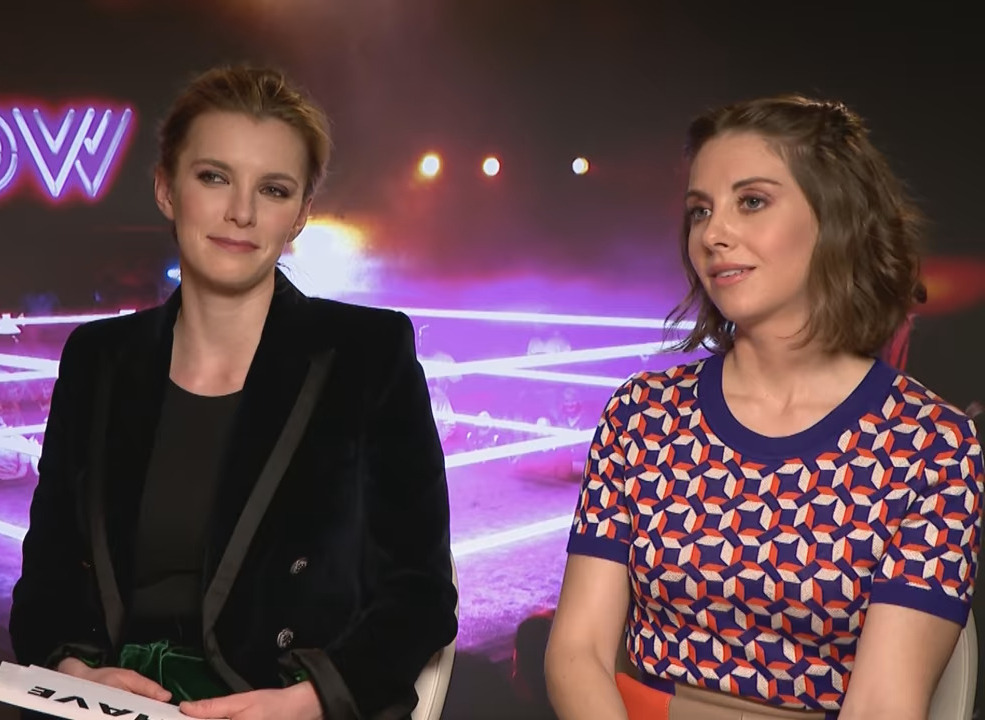
Brie (right) with fellow GLOW actress Betty Gilpin in 2018.

In 2017, she co-starred in several films, including the historical comedy The Little Hours, the biographical comedy-drama The Disaster Artist, and the historical drama The Post. From 2017 to 2019, she starred as Ruth Wilder in the Netflix comedy-drama series GLOW, which was inspired by the 1980s female professional wrestling promotion Gorgeous Ladies of Wrestling. Brie noted that since appearing in GLOW and receiving critical praise for it, she has become more focused on taking "meaningful" roles. For her performance, she earned multiple nominations for the Critics' Choice Television Award for Best Actress in a Comedy Series, the Screen Actors Guild Award for Outstanding Performance by a Female Actor in a Comedy Series, and the Golden Globe Award for Best Actress – Television Series Musical or Comedy.

In 2018, she co-starred in the music video for Beck's "Colors". In 2019, she reprised her voice role as Princess Unikitty in the animated comedy sequel film The Lego Movie 2: The Second Part and provided an English dub for the Japanese animated romantic fantasy film Weathering with You.

=== 2020s ===
In 2020, Brie starred in the drama thriller film Promising Young Woman, directed by Emerald Fennell. Also that year, she wrote, produced and starred as Sarah in the Netflix drama film Horse Girl, which was directed by Jeff Baena. Brie then starred opposite Dan Stevens in the horror film The Rental, which was directed by her husband Dave Franco. Brie played Sloane in the romantic comedy film Happiest Season, directed by Clea DuVall. In 2021, she starred as a celebrity guest voice in the fifth season of the animated sitcom Rick and Morty.

In 2022, Brie starred in and co-wrote the dark comedy film Spin Me Round with frequent collaborator and director Jeff Baena; it was released in select theatres by IFC Films and streamed on AMC+ . She also starred in an episode of the Apple TV+ anthology TV series Roar, "The Woman Who Solved Her Own Murder". The series is based on the eponymous book by Cecelia Ahern.

In 2022, Brie was to reprise her role as Annie in a Community film.

In 2023, Brie wrote and starred in the romantic comedy film Somebody I Used to Know with her husband Dave Franco, who also co-wrote and directed it. It was released on Amazon Prime Video on February 10 and became the #1 film on the platform in the US and worldwide. In 2023, Brie also voiced the character of Aftershock in the Disney Channel animated series Moon Girl and Devil Dinosaur.

In February 2023, Brie was cast in Peacock's limited TV series adaptation of the Liane Moriarty novel Apples Never Fall with Jake Lacy, Annette Bening, and Sam Neill.

On September 4, 2024, she was announced as Evil-Lyn for the upcoming live action movie reboot of Masters of the Universe. She stars as Macy's Gift Guide in the American department store chain's Holiday 2024 advertising campaign.

In 2025, Brie stars with her husband Dave Franco in the supernatural body horror film Together.

== Personal life ==
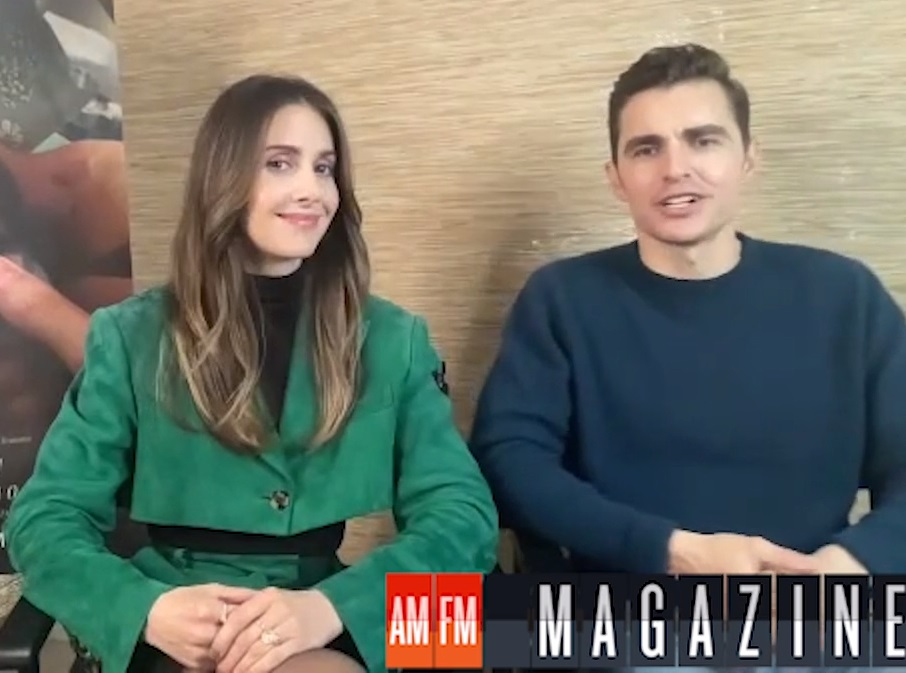
Brie with her husband Dave Franco in 2023

Brie and actor Dave Franco began dating in 2012 after meeting during Mardi Gras in New Orleans. On August 25, 2015, they were reported to be engaged. They married on March 13, 2017. Brie and Franco have collaborated on 5 films together.

Brie has stated in several interviews that she does not want to have children. In a BuzzFeed video released on February 17, 2023, Brie states that she is bisexual.

== Filmography ==
=== Film ===
Year	Title	Role	Notes
2004	Stolen Poem	Alice	Short film
2007	Born	Mary Elizabeth Martino	
2007	Dickie Smalls: From Shame to Fame	Mya	
2008	Parasomnia	Darcy	
2008	The Coverup	Grace	
2008	Buddy 'n' Andy	Michelle	Short film
2008	Salvation, Texas	Lisa Salter	Short film
2009	Us One Night	Alyson	Short film
2010	The Home Front	Hannah	Short film
2010	Raspberry Magic	Ms. Bradlee	
2011	Scream 4	Rebecca Walters	
2012	Save the Date	Beth	
2012	The Five-Year Engagement	Suzie Barnes-Eilhauer	
2012	Montana Amazon	Ella Dunderhead	
2013	The Kings of Summer	Heather Toy	
2014	The Lego Movie	Princess Unikitty	Voice
2014	Harmontown	Herself	Documentary film
2014	Search Party	Elizabeth	
2014	Lennon or McCartney	Herself	Documentary short film
2015	Sleeping with Other People	Elaine "Lainey" Dalton	
2015	Get Hard	Alissa Barrow	
2015	No Stranger Than Love	Lucy Sherrington	
2016	Joshy	Rachel	
2016	How to Be Single	Lucy	
2016	Get a Job	Tanya Sellers	
2016	A Family Man	Lynn Vogel	
2017	The Post	Lally Weymouth	
2017	The Little Hours	Sister Alessandra	
2017	The Disaster Artist	Amber	
2018	Emmet's Holiday Party	Princess Unikitty	Voice, short film
2019	Weathering with You	Natsumi Suga	Voice, English dub
2019	The Lego Movie 2: The Second Part	Princess Unikitty	Voice
2020	Promising Young Woman	Madison McPhee	
2020	Horse Girl	Sarah	Also writer and producer
2020	The Rental	Michelle	
2020	Happiest Season	Sloane Caldwell	
2022	Spin Me Round	Amber	Also writer and producer
2023	Somebody I Used to Know	Ally	Also writer and executive producer
2023	Freelance	Claire Wellington	
2025	Together	Millie Wilson	Also producer
2026	Masters of the Universe	Evil-Lyn	
2026	The Revisionist	Elise	
TBA	The Decline of Fucking Western Civilization †	TBA	Post-production

=== Television ===
Year	Title	Role	Notes
2006	Hannah Montana	Nina	Episode: "It's My Party and I'll Lie if I Want To"
2007	Not Another High School Show	Muffy	Unsold pilot
2007–2015	Mad Men	Trudy Campbell	Recurring role
2008	The Deadliest Lesson	Amber	Television film
2009–2015	Community	Annie Edison	Main role
2011	Robot Chicken	Martha Stewart / Vampire Lifeguard	Voice, episode: "The Godfather of the Bride 2"
2012	NTSF:SD:SUV::	Joanie	Episode: "Sabbath-tage"
2012	American Dad!	Lindsay	Voice, episode: "Adventures in Hayleysitting"
2013	High School USA!	Miss Temple	Voice, episode: "Choices"
2013	Axe Cop	Beautiful Girly Bobs	Voice, episode: "The Dumb List"
2014	Comedy Bang! Bang!	Herself	Episode: "Alison Brie Wears a Black Mesh Top & Mini-Skirt"
2014–2020	BoJack Horseman	Diane Nguyen / Various voices	Voice, main role
2016	Teachers	Lauren Lark	Episode: "Pilot"; also executive producer
2016	Doctor Thorne	Martha Dunstable	Main role
2017	Dr. Ken	Herself	Episode: "Ken's Big Audition"
2017–2019	GLOW	Ruth Wilder	Main role; also directed episode: "Hollywood Homecoming"
2019	Drunk History	Thea Spyer	Episode: "Love"
2020	Make It Work!	Herself	Television special
2020	Marvel's 616	—N/a	Directed episode: "Spotlight"
2021	Cinema Toast	Jane	Voice, episode: "Familiesgiving"
2021	Rick and Morty	Planetina	Voice, episode: "A Rickconvenient Mort"
2021	Star Wars: Visions	Am	Voice, episode: "The Twins"; English dub
2022	Roar	Rebecca Moss	Episode: "The Woman Who Solved Her Own Murder"
2023	Moon Girl and Devil Dinosaur	Aftershock / Allison Dillon	Voice, episode: "Moon Girl Landing"
2023	Carol & the End of the World		Voice, episode: "David"
2024	Apples Never Fall	Amy Delaney	Main role; Miniseries
2024–2025	Krapopolis	Tina	Voice, 3 episodes

=== Web ===
Year	Title	Role	Notes
2008–2009	My Alibi	Rebecca Fuller	Main role
2009	Hot Sluts	Amber	Main role
2012	Sketchy	Meg	Episode: "You Got Retweeted"
2013	The ArScheerio Paul Show	Madonna	Episode: "Madonna & Rosie O'Donnell"
2020	The Cast of Community Reunites for Table Read	Annie Edison	Online Fundraiser

=== Video games ===
Year	Title	Voice role	Ref.
2015	Lego Dimensions	Princess Unikitty	
2016	Marvel Avengers Academy	Black Widow	

=== Music videos ===
Year	Title	Artist	Role	Ref.
2018	"Colors"	Crossfade	Herself	

=== Theme park attractions ===
Year	Title	Voice role	Ref.
2016	The Lego Movie: 4D – A New Adventure	Princess Unikitty	

== Awards and nominations ==
Year	Association	Category	Work	Result	Ref.
2009	Screen Actors Guild Awards	Outstanding Performance by an Ensemble in a Drama Series	Mad Men	Won	
2011	Entertainment Weekly Awards	Best Supporting Actress, Comedy	Community	Nominated	
2012	Entertainment Weekly Awards	Best Supporting Actress, Comedy	Community	Won	
2012	Critics' Choice Television Awards	Best Supporting Actress in a Comedy Series	Community	Nominated	
2014	Streamy Awards	Best Ensemble Cast	The ArScheerio Paul Show	Nominated	
2015	Newport Beach Film Festival Awards	Outstanding Achievement in Acting	No Stranger Than Love	Won	
2017	Annie Awards	Outstanding Achievement, Voice Acting in an Animated TV Production	BoJack Horseman	Nominated	
2018	Critics' Choice Television Awards	Best Actress in a Comedy Series	GLOW	Nominated	
2018	Satellite Awards	Best Actress – Television Series Musical or Comedy	GLOW	Nominated	
2018	Golden Globe Awards	Best Actress – Television Series Musical or Comedy	GLOW	Nominated	
2018	Screen Actors Guild Awards	Outstanding Performance by a Female Actor in a Comedy Series	GLOW	Nominated	
2018	Screen Actors Guild Awards	Outstanding Performance by an Ensemble in a Comedy Series	GLOW	Nominated	
2019	Satellite Awards	Best Actress – Television Series Musical or Comedy	GLOW	Nominated	
2019	Golden Globe Awards	Best Actress – Television Series Musical or Comedy	GLOW	Nominated	
2019	Screen Actors Guild Awards	Outstanding Performance by a Female Actor in a Comedy Series	GLOW	Nominated	
2019	Screen Actors Guild Awards	Outstanding Performance by an Ensemble in a Comedy Series	GLOW	Nominated	
2020	Critics' Choice Television Awards	Best Actress in a Comedy Series	GLOW	Nominated	
2020	Satellite Awards	Best Actress – Television Series Musical or Comedy	GLOW	Nominated	
2024	Astra TV Awards	Best Supporting Actress in a Limited Series or TV Movie	Apples Never Fall	Nominated	
2026	Critics' Choice Super Awards	Best Actress in a Horror Movie	Together	Nominated	
