= Carol Collier =

American ecologist

- Education: Smith College (Bachelor of Arts in biology), University of Pennsylvania (Master of Regional Planning)
- Occupations: Educator, Planner,
- Employer(s): MCB Environmental Engineers, Pennsylvania Department of Environmental Protection, Southeast Region Delaware River Basin Commission Drexel University
- Awards: Touchstone Award from the Society of Women Environmental Professionals (1997) Woman of Distinction Award from the Philadelphia Business Journal (1998) Mary H. Marsh Medal from the American Water Resources Association (AWRA) (2007) Bronze Order of the De Fleury Medal from the U.S. Army Corps of Engineers (2014)

Carol Collier is a Fellow of the American Institute of Certified Planners and Fellow in the American Water Resources Association. She practices and teaches in the Philadelphia metropolitan area, Pennsylvania, United States. A Certified Senior Ecologist, she specializes in watershed management and resilient systems design. She is a faculty member in the Department of Biodiversity, Earth & Environmental Science at Drexel University. Professionally, she serves as an educator, planner, and advocate.

== Education ==
Collier has a Bachelor of Arts in biology from Smith College. She also studied at the University of Pennsylvania, earning a Master of Regional Planning.

== Career ==
Collier began her professional career as an intern at MCB Environmental Engineers, Inc. She worked there for nineteen years before becoming Executive Director of Pennsylvania's 21st Century Environment Commission and regional director of the Pennsylvania Department of Environmental Protection Southeast Region. She next served as the executive director of the Delaware River Basin Commission. Today, Collier is the Director of the Environmental Studies and Sustainability Program and the Senior Advisor on Watershed Management and Policy at the Academy of Natural Sciences, both at Drexel University. In the latter role, she is primarily responsible informing government agencies about how the management initiative is valuable and relevant to their programs.

Collier is a board member for The McHarg Center at the University of Pennsylvania. She also serves on the boards of the American Water Resources Association (AWRA) (President, 2013) and the U.S. Water Alliance. She formerly served as chair of the board for the Pinchot Institute for Conservation. Collier is also a member of her own township's environmental protection advisory board.

Collier is also an educator, planner, and advocate. In addition to being on faculty at Drexel, she also teaches courses at the University of Pennsylvania. She is published on the subjects of the environment and water and has provided testimony to the House of Representatives and the Pennsylvania Legislature. She is a licensed planner in the state of New Jersey and has been part of international water management projects in the People's Republic of China and in Ecuador.

== Awards ==
- Touchstone Award from the Society of Women Environmental Professionals (1997)
- Woman of Distinction Award from the Philadelphia Business Journal (1998)
- Mary H. Marsh Medal from the American Water Resources Association (AWRA) for exemplary contributions to the protection and wise use of the nation's water resources (2007)
- Bronze Order of the DeFleury Medal from the U.S. Army Corps of Engineers (2014)
