= Not Evil Just Wrong =

- Promotional poster for Not Evil Just Wrong
- Directed by: Phelim McAleer; Ann McElhinney
- Produced by: Phelim McAleer; Ann McElhinney
- Distributed by: Greener Horizon Films
- Release date: 18 October 2009
- Running time: 90 minutes
- Country: Ireland
- Language: English

Not Evil Just Wrong is a 2009 climate change denial documentary film by Ann McElhinney and Phelim McAleer that challenges Al Gore's An Inconvenient Truth by claiming that the evidence of global warming is inconclusive and that the impact global warming legislation will have on industry is much more harmful to humans than beneficial. The movie was filmed in 2008 and was screened at the International Documentary Film Festival Amsterdam and at the RightOnline conference in 2009.

== Summary ==
The film argues that the science behind climate change science is not settled. Not Evil Just Wrong focuses on the British High Court ruling which found nine errors in Al Gore's documentary, An Inconvenient Truth. The film also highlights assertions about the Medieval Warm Period and Stephen McIntyre's alleged debunking of the hockey stick graph.

The film also focuses on the impact of climate legislation in developing counties and average families in America. The film states that one of environmentalists' first restrictions on industry was when DDT was banned, led by Rachel Carson. According to the film, the ban on DDT "...has needlessly resulted in the deaths of more than 40 million children and adults in the developing world."

The film then continues to on a similar tack, arguing that climate legislation like cap and trade would negatively impact the life for middle and low-income families in America, particularly those working for energy-related jobs. The directors follow Tiffany McElhany and her family in rural Indiana, to see how fossil fuels have given them better opportunities.

== Production and reception ==
=== Funding ===
In 2008, McElhinney and McAleer raised almost $1 million (€799,000) from real estate investors, but said they needed a total of $4.5 million for a cinema release. After the film was turned down for funding by the Irish Film Board, the filmmakers then began taking donations online. The film failed to find a commercial distributor.

=== Production ===
The documentary has been noted for being a very similar style to Michael Moore's documentaries by using file footage of old movies, cartoons and class-based arguments. McAleer has been quoted saying, "I would not be making documentaries if it wasn't for Michael Moore," he says. "He aroused my interest and people's interest in documentaries. He's also made it acceptable for people to go to the movie theatre and watch documentaries. I hate to say it but we're all children of Michael Moore."

=== Reception ===
Mother Jones published a highly critical article on the movie. Stephanie Mencimer wrote that "The film is poorly organised and rehashes the familiar talking points of climate change sceptics —global warming as bad science; climate concerns as hysteria akin to that over killer bees, etc. Pushing those views are the usual suspects, including Patrick Moore, the Greenpeace founder turned nuclear power lobbyist, and Thatcher-era British politician Nigel Lawson."

A premiere party was held at The Heritage Foundation, where it was also broadcast on Ustream and the American Family Association channel. "We may at last be getting our Michael Moore," said Fred Smith, of the AFA, "A virtuous Michael Moore!" Suzanne Fields from the Washington Times said, "Ann McElhinney's film focuses on people (not polar bears) whose paychecks and families are dependent on coal-generated energy, and whose interests are usually ignored in abstract statistics." The Online Opinion, said that the movie excelled "in pointing to the absurdities and gross contradictions in the current scare over global warming."

== Subsequent events ==
Mother Jones subsequently reported that the husband of Tiffany McElhany, the Indiana women highlighted in the film as at risk of losing her standard of living should controls on carbon be enacted, was laid off from his job at a car parts plant. "It turns out that McElhany's story, too, is more complicated than Not Evil would have you believe. She is by far the documentary's most compelling character, and seems poised to become a minor heroine to the Tea Party crowd. Yet for all her talk of the bounty that coal has brought to Vevay, when I contacted her for this story she disclosed that her husband was laid off in March and has been unemployed ever since. It appears that a lot of dirty industry jobs have disappeared with no help at all from environmentalists."
