= Smurfit =

Smurfit may refer to:

- Alan Smurfit (born 1943), Irish retiree who won a World Series of Poker bracelet
- Michael Smurfit (born 1936), businessman holding dual Irish and British citizenship
- Tony Smurfit (born 1963), British-born Irish businessman
- Victoria Smurfit (born 1974), Irish actress

== See also ==
- Michael Smurfit Graduate School of Business in Dublin, Ireland
- Smurfit Westrock, European corrugated packaging company
- Smurfit-Stone Building, 41 story, 582 foot (177 m) skyscraper in downtown Chicago, Illinois, USA
- Smurfit-Stone Container, global paperboard and paper-based packaging company based in Creve Coeur, Missouri, and Chicago, Illinois, USA
