= Anna Livia (monument) =

Bronze monument in Dublin, Ireland

- Anna Livia Plurabelle
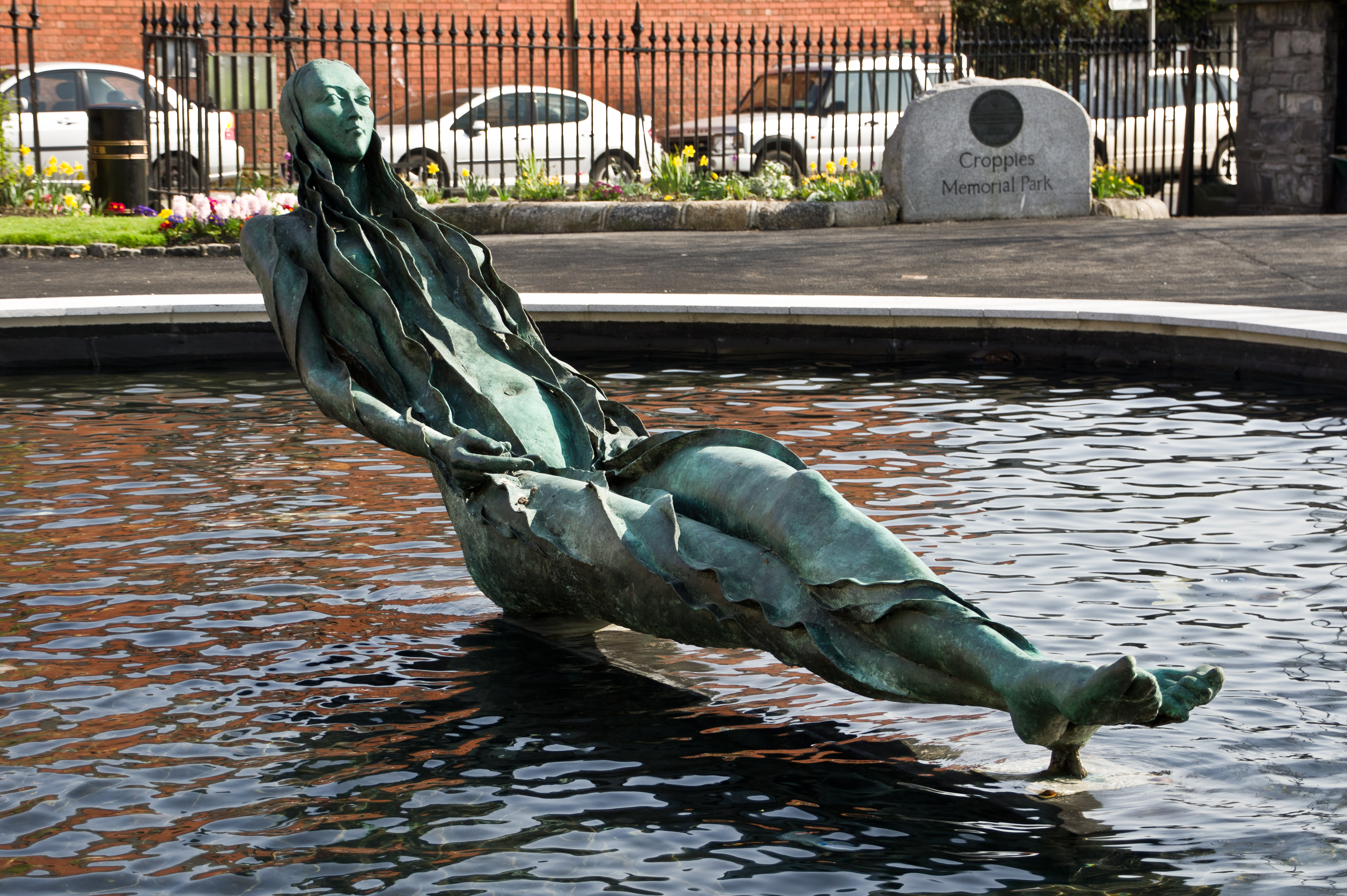
- Anna Livia in Croppies' Memorial Park
- Interactive map of Anna Livia
- Location: Croppies Memorial Park opposite the Ashling Hotel, near Heuston station since February 2011
- Coordinates: 53.3477°N 6.2903°W
- Designer: Éamonn O'Doherty
- Material: Bronze
- Length: 18ft
- Beginning date: 1988
- Completion date: June 1988
- Opening date: 17 June 1988; 38 years ago
- Dedicated to: Michael Smurfit's father, James Joyce's Finnegans Wake
- Financier: Jefferson Smurfit Group plc

Anna Livia is a bronze monument located in Croppies' Memorial Park in Dublin, Ireland. It was formerly located on O'Connell Street, where it lay as the centrepiece in a stone fountain. The monument is a personification of the River Liffey (Abhainn na Life in Irish) which runs through the city. Anna Livia Plurabelle is the name of a character in James Joyce's Finnegans Wake who also embodies the river.

== History ==
=== Background ===
Designed by the sculptor Éamonn O'Doherty, the monument was commissioned by businessman Michael Smurfit in memory of his father and intended as the main contribution of the Smurfit Group to the Dublin Millennium celebrations in 1988. On 10 February 1988, The Irish Times noted that the plans for the 94-foot long stone "fountain" element of the monument had been "generally welcomed" the day before at a meeting of Dublin City Council's planning committee:

A £200,000 "water feature" 94 feet long, which is designed to suggest the course of the River Liffey from the mountains to the sea will be built this year in the centre of O'Connell Street.

It was intended that the fountain, to include a bronze of Anna Livia, be sited just north of the former site of Nelson's Pillar on O'Connell Street, thus leaving that site free for another monument in the future, such as a potential memorial to Padraig Pearse, as mooted by the planning committee. The fountain scheme was set to be co-designed by Sean Mulcahy (as artist and consulting engineer) and Éamonn O'Doherty (as architect and sculptor).

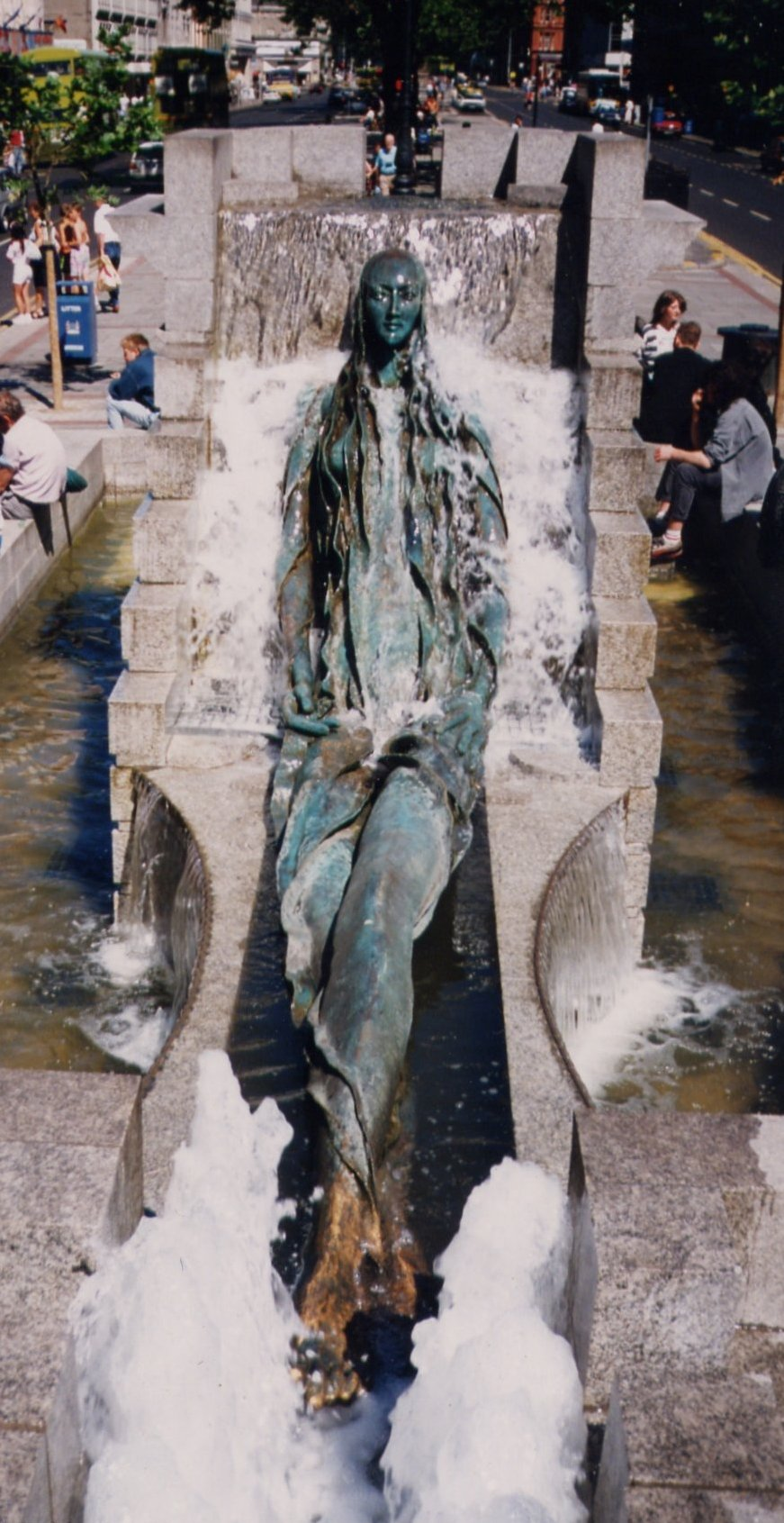
The monument in its original site in the centre of O'Connell Street in 1989

In the proposed monument, the "mermaid-like" figure of Anna Livia, depicted as a young woman, would recline in a sloping stone basin, with four curved weirs at either end. Water would flow past the figure, while "30 to 40 low aerated jets" would propel the water. Joe Doyle of Fine Gael opined that placing Anna Livia in a structure resembling an enormous chaise longue would make the monument resemble "a mausoleum to someone who had died". Other criticisms of the piece were raised too.

On 24 February 1988, it was noted that Dublin city councillors were expected to make their final decision on the proposed "Smurfit Fountain", as it was then known, in less than two weeks. Frank McDonald of The Irish Times interviewed O'Doherty about some of the criticisms which had been levelled against it, such as that it resembled an "oil tanker in the Persian gulf". O'Doherty noted he was then working on a series of maquettes of the intended Anna Livia figure, "with the intention of making it less naturalistic and more impressionistic", partly to address potential objections, as McDonald suggested, to the installation of a sculpture of a nude female figure on the primary street of the capital.

According to writer Brian Lynch, the commission was "awarded without consultation or open competition" and took "a mere six months from commissioning to installation". O'Doherty later admitted that "the hurry to build it, led to a lack of refinement in some details of the stonework and the figure, particularly the head". The sculpture was cast at the Cast bronze foundry in the Liberties area of Dublin.

In 2001, shortly after the monument's removal from its original setting, The Irish Times wrote that it had been Dublin's "best-known piece of sculpture", and had "provoked equal amounts of outrage and enthusiasm" even before its unveiling in June 1988.

=== Opening and early years ===
The monument was officially dedicated on the evening of 17 June 1988 by Lord Mayor of Dublin Alderman Carmencita Hederman and Dr. Michael Smurfit, with between 300 and 400 people in attendance, including "around 40" anti-extradition protestors who disrupted the ceremony. The cables for the loudspeakers had been cut by the protestors, rendering Hederman and Smurfit's "brief addresses" to the crowd "virtually inaudible", and a planned performance by a choir from Central Michigan University, assembled at the edge of the fountain, had to be cancelled. The assembled crowd increased to 1,000 as one protestor smashed a window on a nearby building to sit out on a window ledge with a large unfurled banner reading "no extradition". Although officially dedicated as the Anna Livia Water Feature, Dubliners nicknamed the monument the "Floozie in the Jacuzzi", a nickname that was encouraged by the sculptor.

The monument, including the stone surround, measured 94 feet long, 16 feet wide and less than 12 feet high. Despite its aesthetic appeal, the sculpture's location along the capital's main thoroughfare proved problematic, and the monument soon became a gathering point for what The Irish Independent described as "undesirables". The water surrounding the sculpture eventually became filled with litter, soapflakes and used syringes. The waters were turned off, and at some point prior to August 2001, the basin in which the statue lay was drained, and for a time "treated by some as a nocturnal public toilet", according to The Irish Times.

=== Relocation ===
In November 2001, the monument was removed from O'Connell Street because of the anti-social behaviour as well as to make way for the Spire of Dublin. The sculpture spent the next ten years in a wooden box in a potting shed at Saint Anne's Park in Raheny. Dublin City Council worked to find a new location for the sculpture in keeping with O'Doherty's wish that it be a location close to the Liffey, after whom it is named, and sited in water. The angle of the statue was found to be too upright for the new location, and so it was "reworked and refurbished" by O'Doherty and staff at the same foundry at which it was originally cast.

On 24 February 2011, the reworked statue was floated up the Liffey in a barge from Grand Canal Dock to Wolfe Tone Quay near Heuston station and hoisted by crane onto Victoria Quay and brought to Croppies Memorial Park.

== Gallery ==
The monument, including stone basin, in 1991

The monument in 1997

The statue in Croppies Memorial Park

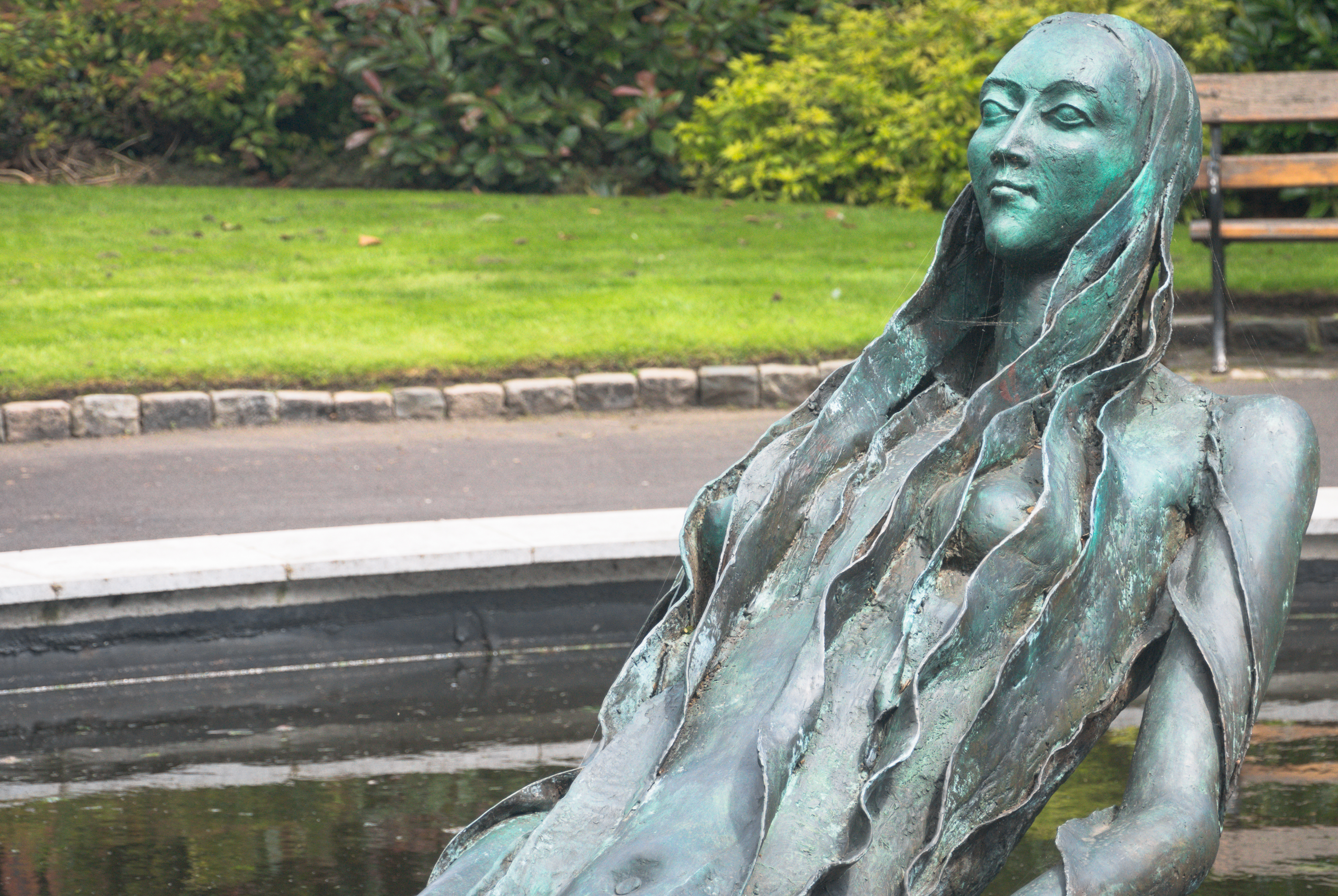
Closeup of Anna Livia
