= Éamonn O'Doherty (sculptor) =

- Born: 18 June 1939; Derry, County Londonderry, Northern Ireland
- Died: 4 August 2011 (aged 72); Dublin, Republic of Ireland
- Occupation: Sculptor
- Notable work: Anna Livia monument

Éamonn O'Doherty (18 June 1939 – 4 August 2011) was an Irish sculptor, painter, printmaker, photographer and lecturer. He was known for his sculptures in public places, with author Brian Lynch describing him in 2008 as "the best-known of any living Irish artist (although) he may also be, as far as name-recognition is concerned, the least famous." He was born in Derry and raised in Donegal, and died, aged 72, in Dublin.

Well-known sculptures by Éamonn O'Doherty include the Quincentennial Sculpture on Eyre Square in Galway and the Anna Livia monument, in 2011 moved to the Croppies' Acre Memorial Park, in Dublin. In Derry, his sculpture group The Emigrants stands on the site of the former Derry docks where so many immigrants departed for a new life in America. An original drawing of the artist is exhibited in the Tower Museum in Derry.

O'Doherty also won awards for his paintings, amongst other on the Irish Exhibition of Living Art. In 2002, an exhibition of his photographs from the collection of the Irish Traditional Music Archive toured around the United States.

In the summer of 1966, O'Doherty was the first manager of Sweeney's Men and had painted the band's logo on the front of their van, from a drawing by Johnny Moynihan. According to Andy Irvine, O'Doherty was quite adept at playing the flute. He had also toured with Irvine in Denmark in the early part of 1966.

== Academics ==
O'Doherty studied at St Columb's College, Derry going on to University College, Dublin (UCD), where he earned a degree in architecture. Later he became lecturer at the Department of Architecture at the Dublin Institute of Technology. In various capacities he also taught on the Dún Laoghaire College of Art and Design (Ireland), the École Spéciale d'Architecture in Paris (France), Harvard University (USA), the University of Nebraska–Lincoln (USA) and the University of Jordan (Jordan).

== Work ==
Brian Lynch writes that the politics of O'Doherty's large-scale public work "are not obvious; they have to be probed for and then decoded." Lynch notes that this is true even in relation to the overtly political "Armoured Pram" of 1991, which O'Doherty describes as 'a wry allusion to the need for vulnerable, soft-fleshed, humanity to encase itself in armour to protect against the murderous batterings of one against the other."

Lynch writes that O'Doherty was a genius with "antennae as sensitive" to the Irish zeitgeist as Anthony Gormley's is to the English.

== Personal life ==
Éamonn O'Doherty was married to Barbara Ó Brolchain. They had 3 daughters and one son.

== Gallery ==
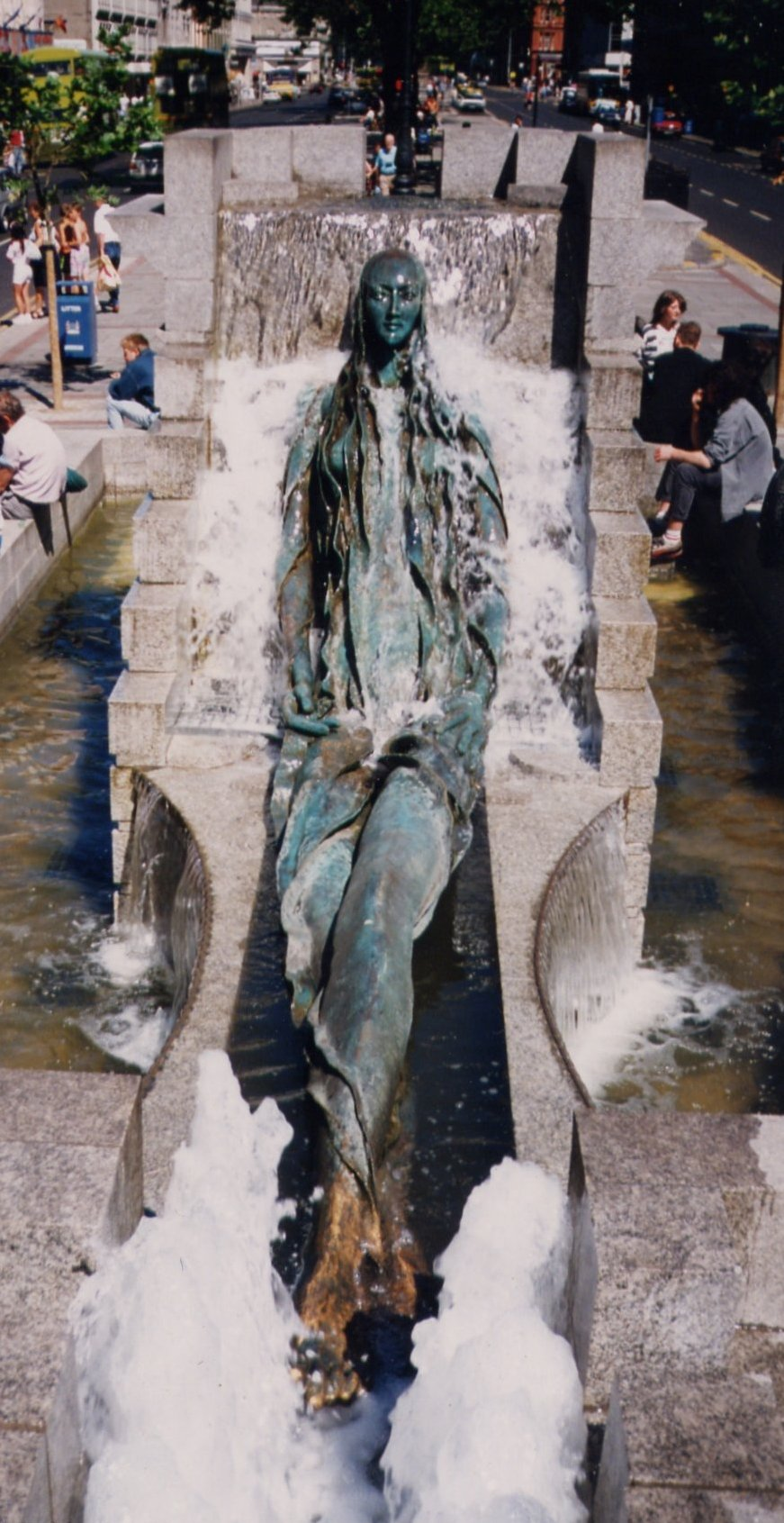
Anna Livia monument, Dublin

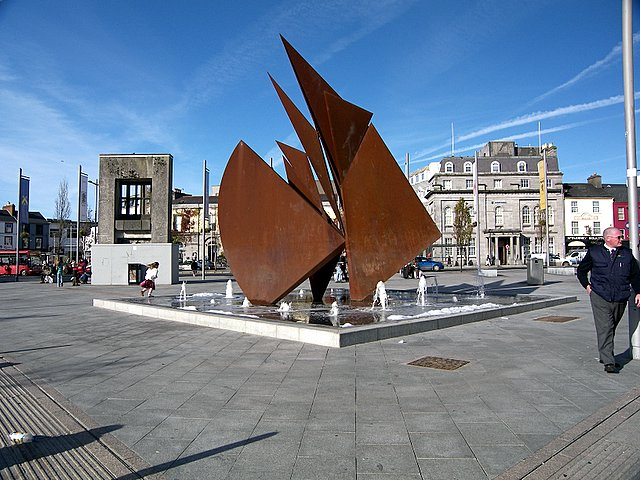
Galway Hookers, Quincentennial sculpture, Galway

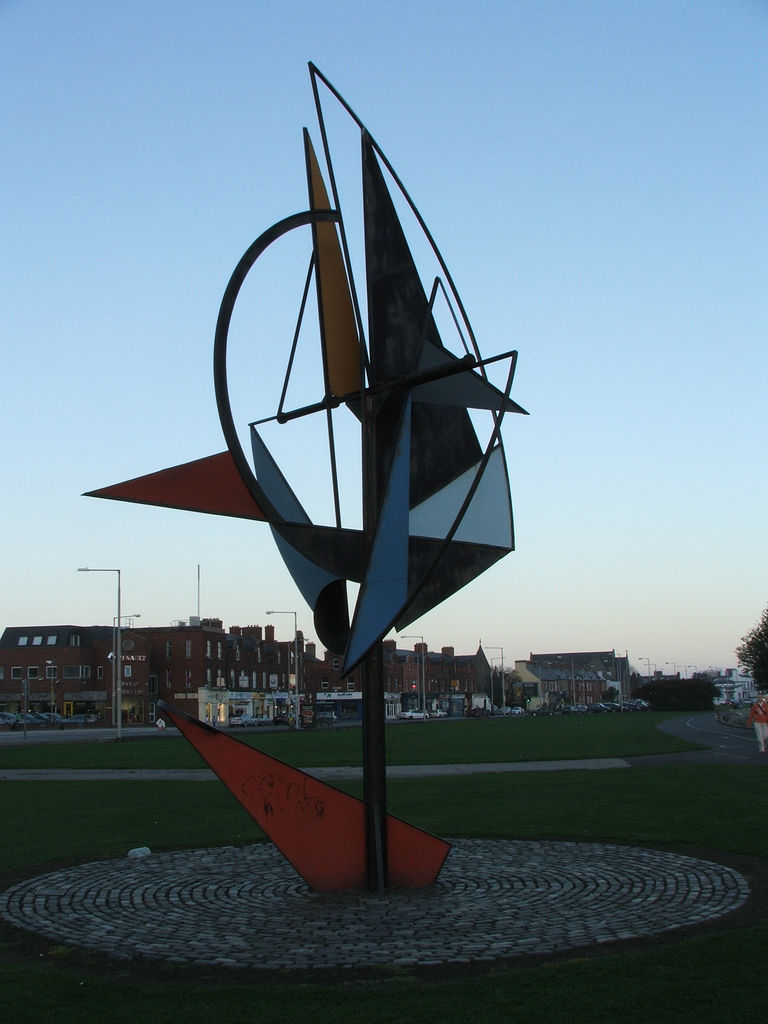
Wind sculpture, Dublin

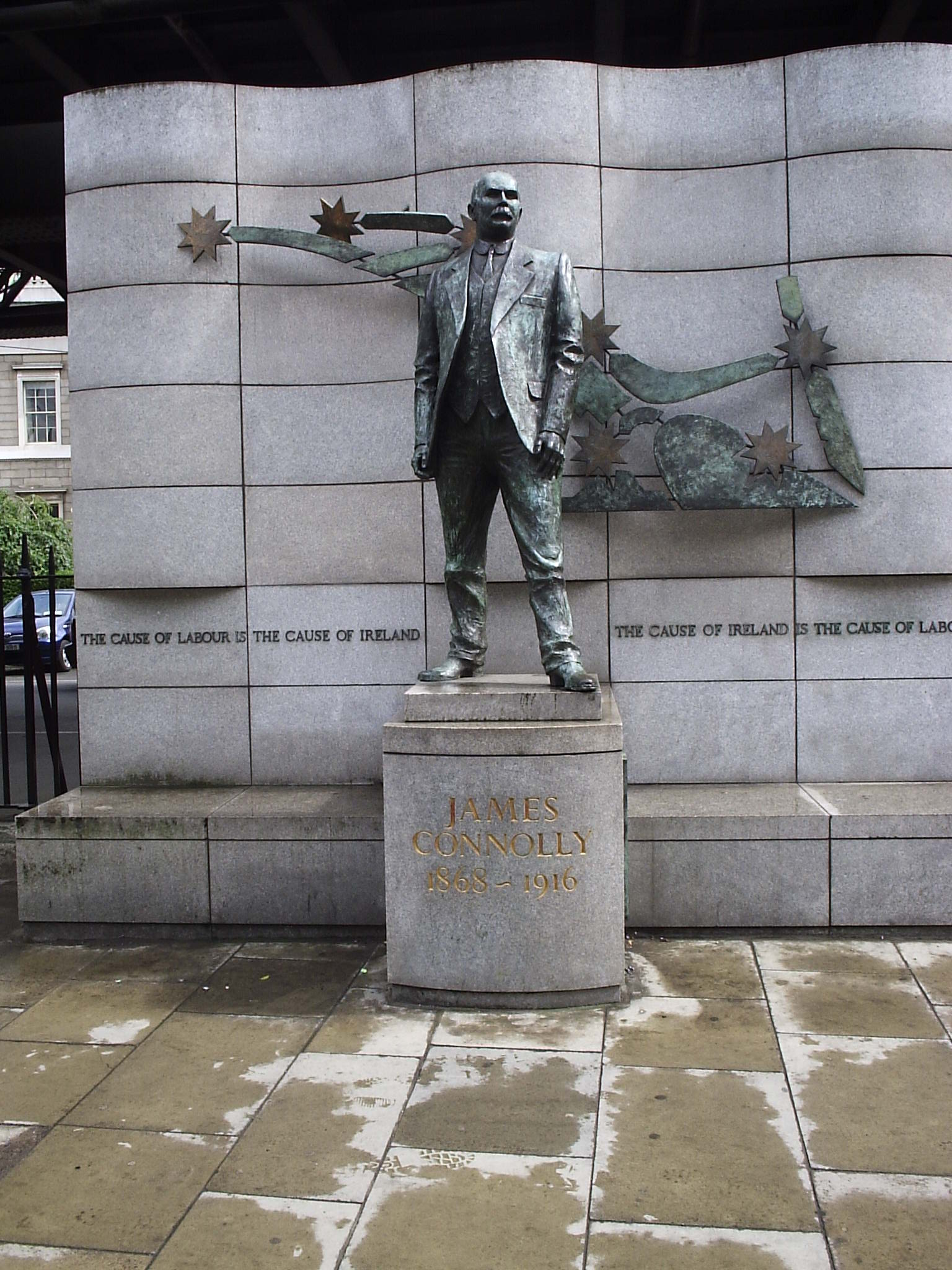
James Connolly Memorial, Dublin

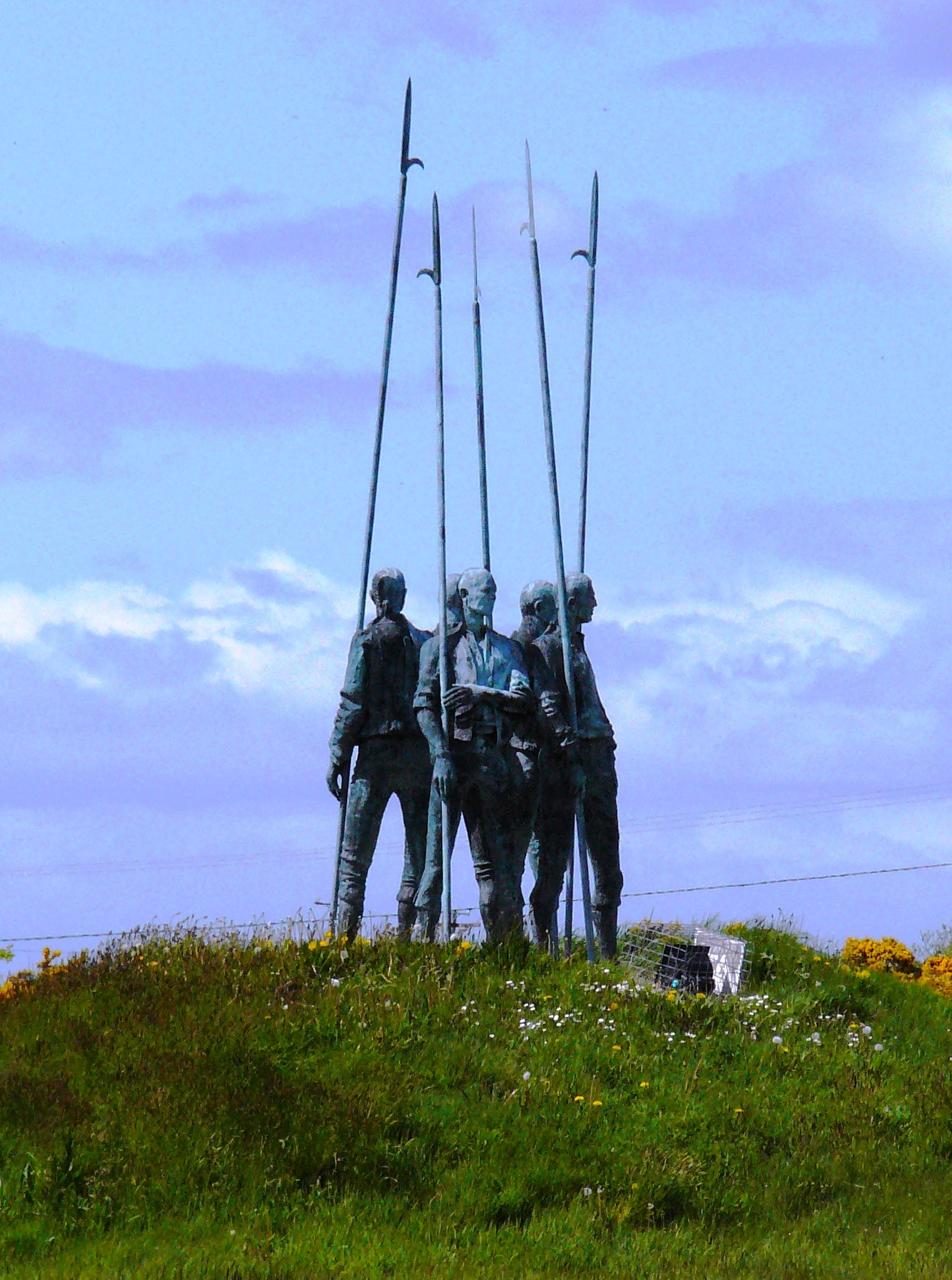
United Irish Pikemen 1798, Wexford

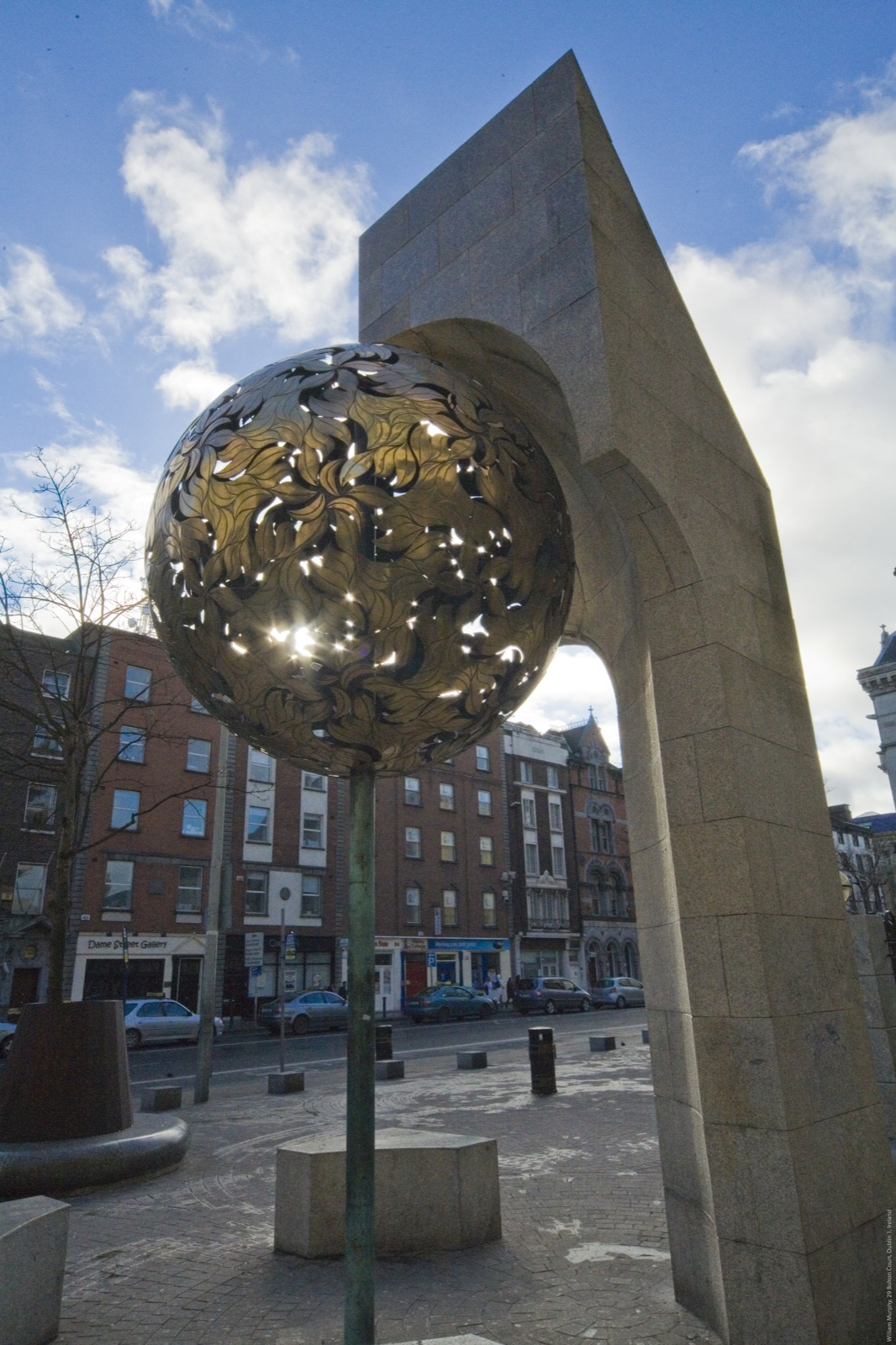
Crann an Óir in front of the former Central Bank of Ireland building, Dublin

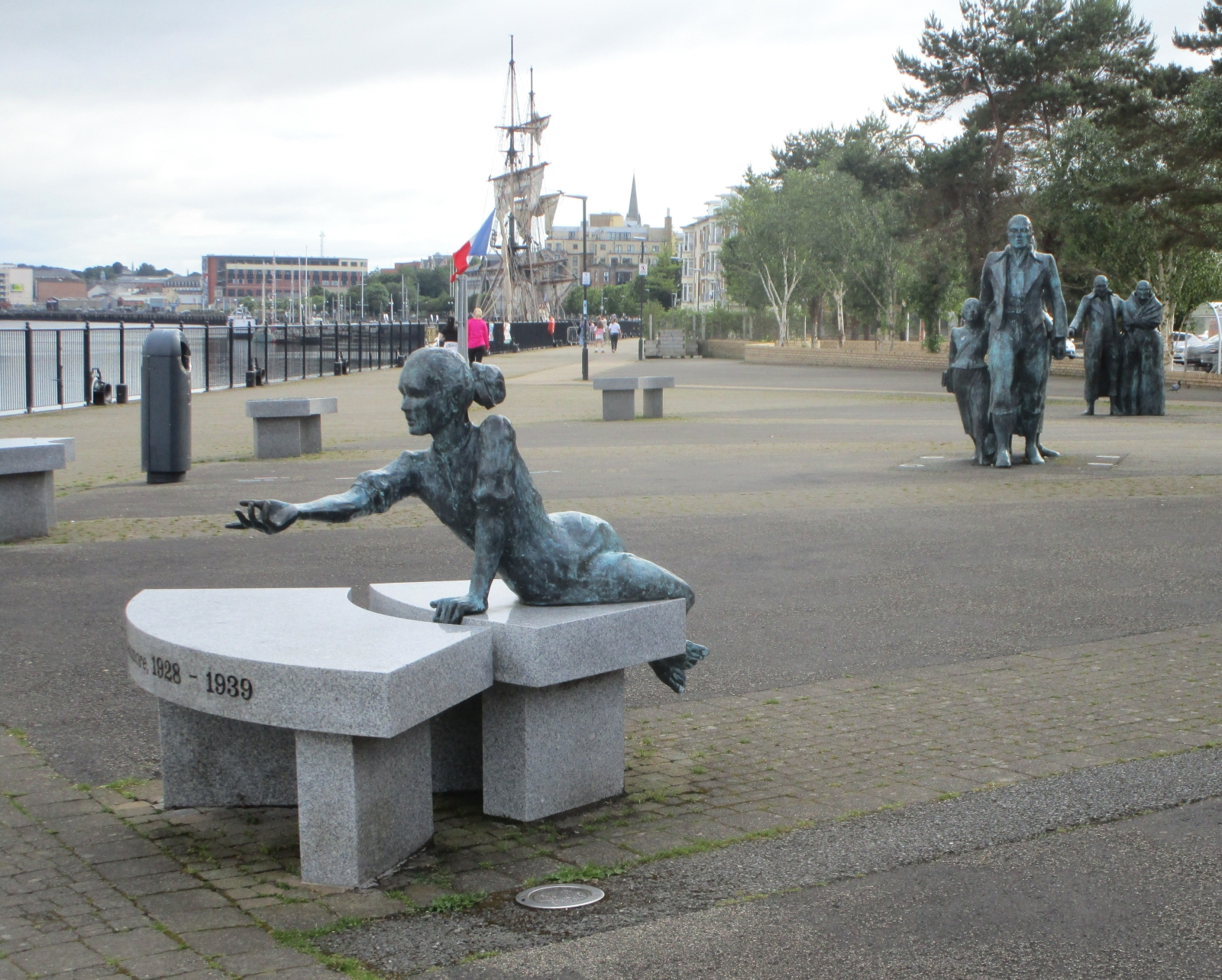
The Emigrants on the Atlantic Quay in Derry

== See also ==
- List of public art in Dublin
- List of public art in Galway city
