= Michel Flamme =

French chef

- Born: France
- Occupation: Chef
- Known for: Michelin star

Michel Flamme is a French chef. He worked in the Michelin starred Byerly Turk Restaurant of the Kildare Hotel and Golf Club (K Club) in Straffan, County Kildare, when it earned its stars between 1993 and 1994.

== Early life and career ==
Flamme's first Irish job was in restaurant Mirabeau in 1984. Later he moved to the K Club. He was executive head chef of the K Club until at least 2000.

In 2006, Flamme moved to the high-profile restaurant No. 10 in Dublin. Despite his cooking, this project ended in bankruptcy.

In 2008, he worked in Solis Lough Eske in Donegal.

== Awards ==
- Michelin star 1993-1994
