= Ballad of the Irish Horse =

Studio album by The Chieftains
- Released: 1986
- Recorded: Windmill Lane, Dublin, Ireland
- Genre: Celtic
- Label: Claddagh Records
- Producer: Paddy Moloney

The Chieftains chronology
The Chieftains in China (1985)	Ballad of the Irish Horse (1986)	Celtic Wedding (1987)

Professional ratings
Review scores
Source	Rating
Allmusic	3/5 stars

Ballad of the Irish Horse is an album released by the Irish musical group The Chieftains in 1986. The album serves as the soundtrack for a National Geographic documentary, The Ballad of the Irish Horse, which documented the history and tradition of horses in Ireland.

== Track listing ==
1. "Ballad of the Irish Horse Main Theme"
2. "The Green Pastures"
3. "The Birth of the Foals"
4. "Lady Hemphill"
5. "Horses of Ireland, pt.1"
6. "Chasing the Fox"
7. "Going to the Fair"
8. "Galway Races"
9. "Sceal an Chapaill" (The Story of the Horse)
10. "The Boyne Hunt/Mullingar Races/ The Five Mile Chase"
11. "Horses of Ireland, pt.2"

== Sources and links ==
- Ballad of the Irish Horse at AllMusic
