= St. Vincent's C.B.S. =

School in Glasnevin, Dublin, Ireland

St Vincent's C.B.S.
- Glasnevin, Dublin, Ireland

Information
- Motto: Confido (I Trust [in you, O Lord])
- Religious affiliations: Roman Catholic (Irish Christian Brothers)
- Established: 1856
- Principal: Maire Quinn (Secondary); Danny Reilly (Primary)
- Teaching staff: c.51
- Enrollment: c.370 boys (Secondary) c.270 boys and girls (Primary)
- Colours: Blue and Yellow
- Trustees: Edmund Rice Schools Trust

St Vincent's Secondary School, or St Vincent's CBS, is an independent Catholic Voluntary Secondary School in Glasnevin, Dublin, Ireland. It operates as a registered charity under the trusteeship of the Edmund Rice Schools Trust. As of 2017, St Vincent's CBS secondary school had an enrollment of 375 boys.

== History ==
The school was founded in 1856, when the Society of St Vincent de Paul purchased a building in Mountbrown, Kilmainham. Within a year, this building proved to be too small and land was purchased at the junction of Finglas Road and Botanic Road in Glasnevin. A building was erected on the site of what later became the Dalcassian Downs residential development. This school opened in 1860 and had residential accommodation for 150 boy boarders, teaching facilities, and a farm which supplied milk and vegetables.

Initially run by the Congregation of the Holy Ghost (Spiritans), in 1863 the Congregation of Christian Brothers took over. Day boys were enrolled from January 1927, and a new primary school building was opened in 1939.

At the centenary in 1956, there were still 140 boarders and the farm was still in operation.

The secondary school continued to operate in the old building until new buildings were opened in 1964. Boarding continued until 1973 when the school became entirely a day school. A swimming pool was built in 1968 and a sports hall in 1976. (The pool closed in late 2009, due to "lack of funds needed for repairs").

The main school frontage is now on Finglas Road in Glasnevin, Dublin 11, opposite Glasnevin cemetery. Behind the secondary school, and between it and the playing fields, is St Vincent's primary school.

The former principal of St. Vincent's secondary school, John Horan, served as president of the GAA from 2018 to 2021.

== Facilities ==
The school was recently refurbished, including with new equipment for its chemistry, physics and computer laboratories, and the extension of the Arts & Crafts, Construction Technology and Library multimedia facilities were completed in 2017.

The school has over 10 acres of sports fields. A large sports hall/gymnasium complex contains a gaelic handball alley, a basketball court where large-scale competitions are held, and other facilities such as specialist classrooms, a canteen and an oratory.

== Achievements ==
A student from the school (Walter Hayes) won the Young Scientist Exhibition in 1967 and the school won the Young Social Innovators Award in 2006.

In terms of sport, the school is known for basketball and teams representing the school have won several national titles. Swimming, including water polo, is also popular. St. Vincent's won the men's All-Ireland championship in 2023 and 2024.

The school also has athletics, rugby, soccer, hurling, gaelic football and boxing squads.

== Alumni ==
=== Arts and media ===
- Patrick Collins - Painter
- Ronan Collins - RTÉ broadcaster
- Patrick Cosgrave - Journalist and writer
- Jack Cruise - Theatre actor and comedian
- Vincent Doyle - Journalist and newspaper editor
- Aidan Gillen - Stage and screen actor
- Pat Liddy - Artist, historian, author and lobbyist
- Alan Moore - Sports journalist and administrator
- Frank McDonald - Environment editor of The Irish Times
- Simon Young - RTÉ presenter

=== Politics and administration ===
- Frank Cluskey - Labour Party leader, Minister for Trade, Commerce and Tourism
- Fr John Fogarty - Superior General, Congregation of the Holy Spirit
- Declan Kelly - Ambassador
- John O'Connell - Politician (TD, Ceann Comhairle, Senator and MEP)
- Francis Martin O'Donnell - Senior UN official and ambassador
- Jim Tunney - Politician and Gaelic footballer

=== Sport ===
- Paul Caffrey - Gaelic footballer
- Eamonn Coghlan - Olympian, senator and world champion athlete
- Kenny Cunningham - Republic of Ireland international soccer player
- Dessie Farrell - Dublin Gaelic football men's senior manager
- John Furlong - CEO of the 2010 Vancouver Olympic Organizing Committee
- Dessie Glynn - Republic of Ireland international soccer
- Pat Hickey - Olympic Council of Ireland, International Olympic Committee
- John Horan - President of GAA
- Con Martin - Soccer and Gaelic footballer
- Mick Martin - Soccer player
- Jason Sherlock - Gaelic footballer
- Harry Thuillier - Olympic fencer and broadcaster
