= Vinnie Doyle =

Irish journalist and newspaper editor

- Born: Vincent S. Doyle; 1938; Dublin
- Died: 21 September 2010 (aged 72); Blackrock Clinic, Blackrock, Dublin
- Education: St. Vincent's CBS, Glasnevin
- Occupations: Journalist, Editor

Vincent Doyle (1938 – 21 September 2010) was an Irish journalist noted as having served as editor of the Irish Independent for 24 years, considered a lengthy period in Irish terms. He also served as editor of the Evening Herald for several years prior to this.

Doyle was originally from Dublin, reared in Glasnevin, was initially a copy boy until he became a reporter. He joined The Irish Press in 1958, later transferring to The Sunday Press and then onto the Independent Group. In 1977 he was made editor of the Evening Herald. In 1981 Doyle was made editor of the Irish Independent. He was also credited with creating the Weekend magazine which comes with the Saturday edition of the Irish Independent.

He was married to Gertie and the couple had three sons; all four of them outlived Doyle. The pair often travelled to far-flung destinations when Doyle was alive. Doyle shunned the spotlight and often wore sleeve garters. He regularly worked late hours. As editor of the Irish Independent he appeared on radio and television just twice.

Upon his death at the age of 72 in 2010 he received a tribute from Taoiseach Brian Cowen who described him as "a legendary figure in Irish media". Several other political leaders, such as Eamon Gilmore, John Gormley and Enda Kenny, also sang his praises. Kevin Myers described him as the "last great working editor", the other two having been, according to Myers, Tim Pat Coogan and Douglas Gageby. James Downey also opined that Gageby was his only rival, describing Doyle as "one of the greatest Irish editors of his time, probably of all time".

Doyle was interred in Kilmashogue Cemetery after funeral Mass at the Annunciation Church in Rathfarnham, Dublin on 23 September 2010. Hundreds of people attended, including notable journalists, Vincent Browne, former taoiseach Albert Reynolds, MEP Mairead McGuinness and a representative of the President. Doyle had been ill for a brief spell, before dying at the Blackrock Clinic on 21 September 2010.
