= Alan Smurfit =

Irish poker player (died 2020)

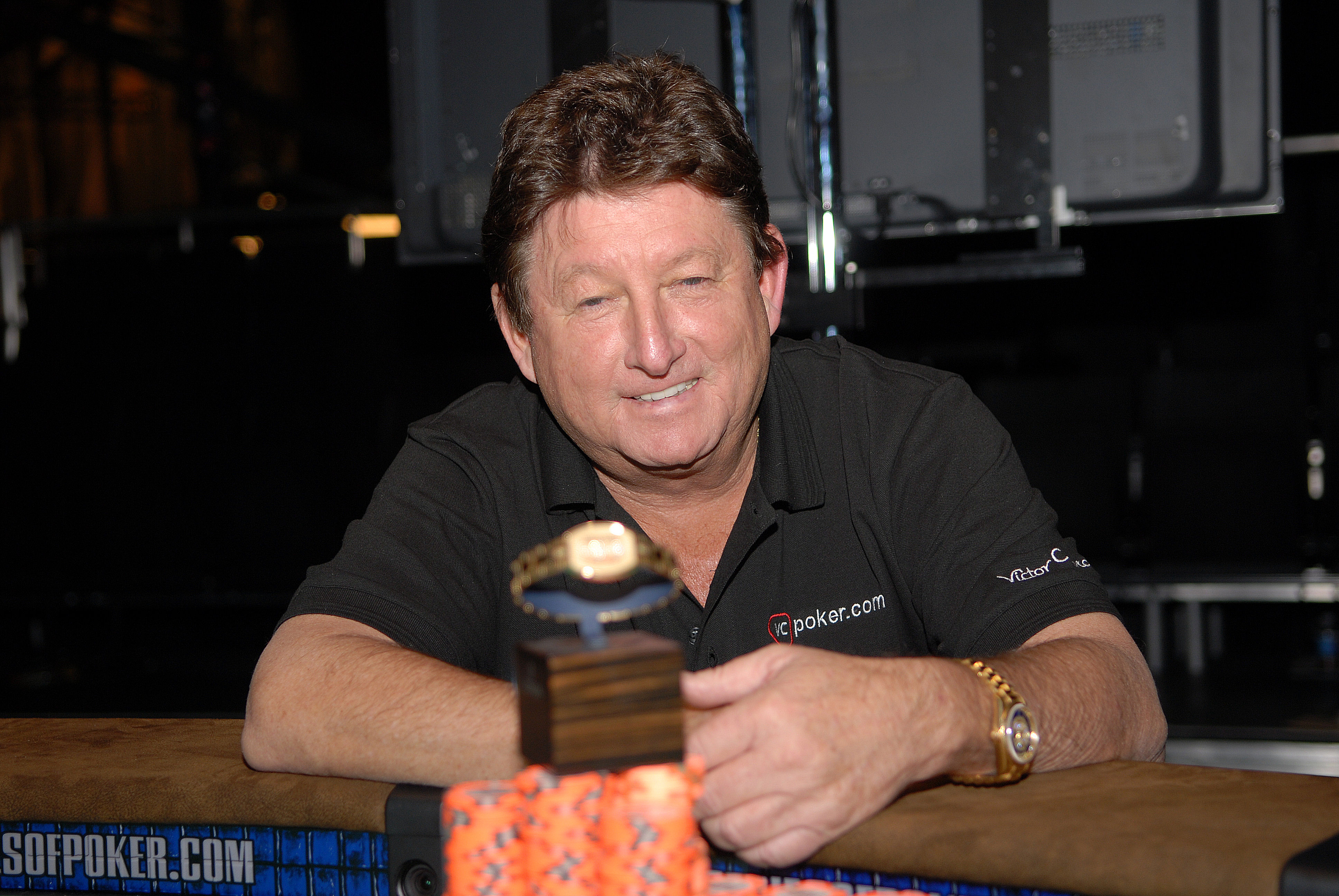
- Smurfit at the 2007 World Series of Poker
- Died: 13 September 2020

World Series of Poker
- Bracelet: 1
- Money finishes: 2

World Poker Tour
- Final table: 1
- Money finishes: 6

European Poker Tour
- Final table: 1
- Money finishes: 3

Alan Smurfit (died 13 September 2020, aged 77) was an Irish retiree who won a World Series of Poker bracelet in his first ever World Series of Poker (WSOP) event, the 2007 $1,500 Pot Limit Omaha event.

Although Smurfit was a newcomer to the WSOP, he had been playing tournament poker for many years, with an early televised appearance in The Gaming Club World Poker Championship in 2004. He also made several money finishes in the World Poker Tour, including the TV bubble finish for season 4's Mirage Poker Showdown, and winning the Palm Beach CelebPoker Classic 2005 event. When the final table of his WSOP victory began, Smurfit was in last place with only $95,000 in chips. His closest competitor had 10 times that amount. The last table lasted over nine hours, but the heads up play was one of the longest in WSOP history lasting 167 hands.

His brother, Sir Michael Smurfit, KBE, owned the K-Club. As of 2008, his live tournament winnings exceed $1,000,000.

The Irish Times reported that he died "suddenly" on 13 September 2020 at the age of 77.

== World Series of Poker bracelets ==
Year	Tournament	Prize (US$)
2007	$1,500 Pot Limit Omaha w/rebuys	$464,867
