= The Chieftains in China =

Studio album by The Chieftains
- Released: 1985
- Recorded: 1983, Windmill Lane Studios, Dublin; China and Hong Kong
- Genre: Irish folk music
- Length: 51:54
- Label: Shanachie Records
- Producer: Paddy Moloney

The Chieftains chronology
Concert Orchestra (1982)	The Chieftains in China (1985)	Ballad of the Irish Horse (1986)

Professional ratings
Review scores
Source	Rating
Allmusic	4.5/5 stars

The Chieftains in China is an album released by the Irish musical group The Chieftains in 1985. In 1983, the Chieftains were the first Irish musicians to visit China and the first ever Western musical group to play on the Great Wall of China. The album was the result of this trip and was recorded in China and Hong Kong by Brian Masterson of Windmill Lane Studios.

== Background ==
In 1980, diplomats from the Chinese Embassy in London attended Royal Albert Hall for "The Sense of Ireland" festival, where the Chieftains were performing. The diplomats had enjoyed the performance so much that they invited the band to visit China on a musical tour. As China had no embassy in Ireland at the time this was problematic.

When full diplomatic relations between Ireland and China were established in 1981, Moloney planned the trip with Chinese ambassadors and sent copies of Irish music to various Chinese orchestras. The Chieftains were one of the first groups from the West to visit China and became the first ever Western group to play on the Great Wall of China. While in China the group performed with various Chinese folk orchestras, as well as more impromptu performances with local musicians.

The Chieftains in China is a compilation of the songs played while the Chieftains visited China. It was released two years after the tour.

== Track listing ==
1. "Full of Joy" - 2:32
2. "In a Suzhow Garden" - 3:33
3. "If I Had Maggie in the Wood" - 3:24
4. "The Reason for My Sorrow" - 3:40
5. "The Chieftains in China" - 11:49
6. "Planxty Irwin" - 2:56
7. "Off the Great Wall" - 5:23
8. "A Tribute to O'Carolan" - 10:54
9. "The Wind from the South" - 3:23
10. "China to Hong Kong" - 4:20

== Legacy ==
The final concert The Chieftains performed was filmed by Chinese television and broadcast to 700 million people. Leading Chinese politicians attended the performance and Chieftains biographer John Glatt wrote that the tour cemented diplomatic relations between Ireland and China.

Sun Sheng, the vice chairman of the Musician's Association of China said of the visit, "I think through The Chieftains' music, I have seen the images of the Irish people. Music knows no boundaries for it is a unique and comprehensive language."

The Chieftains returned to Ireland with a large collection of Chinese instruments that they planned to learn and incorporate into their music. Moloney told RTÉ Radio that he planned to use some of the Chinese music in film scores that he was composing.

== Personnel ==
- Paddy Moloney – Uilleann pipes, tin whistle
- Seán Keane – fiddle
- Martin Fay – fiddle, bones
- Derek Bell – neo Irish harp, tiompán
- Kevin Conneff – bodhrán, Chinese gong, vocals
- Matt Molloy - flute
- Pearse Dunne - Mixing
- Pat Liddy - Photography
- Brian Masterson - Engineer
- Mick O'Gorman - Assistant Engineer
- Bill Somerville - Large Mixing
