= Croppies' Acre =

Memorial public park in Dublin, Ireland

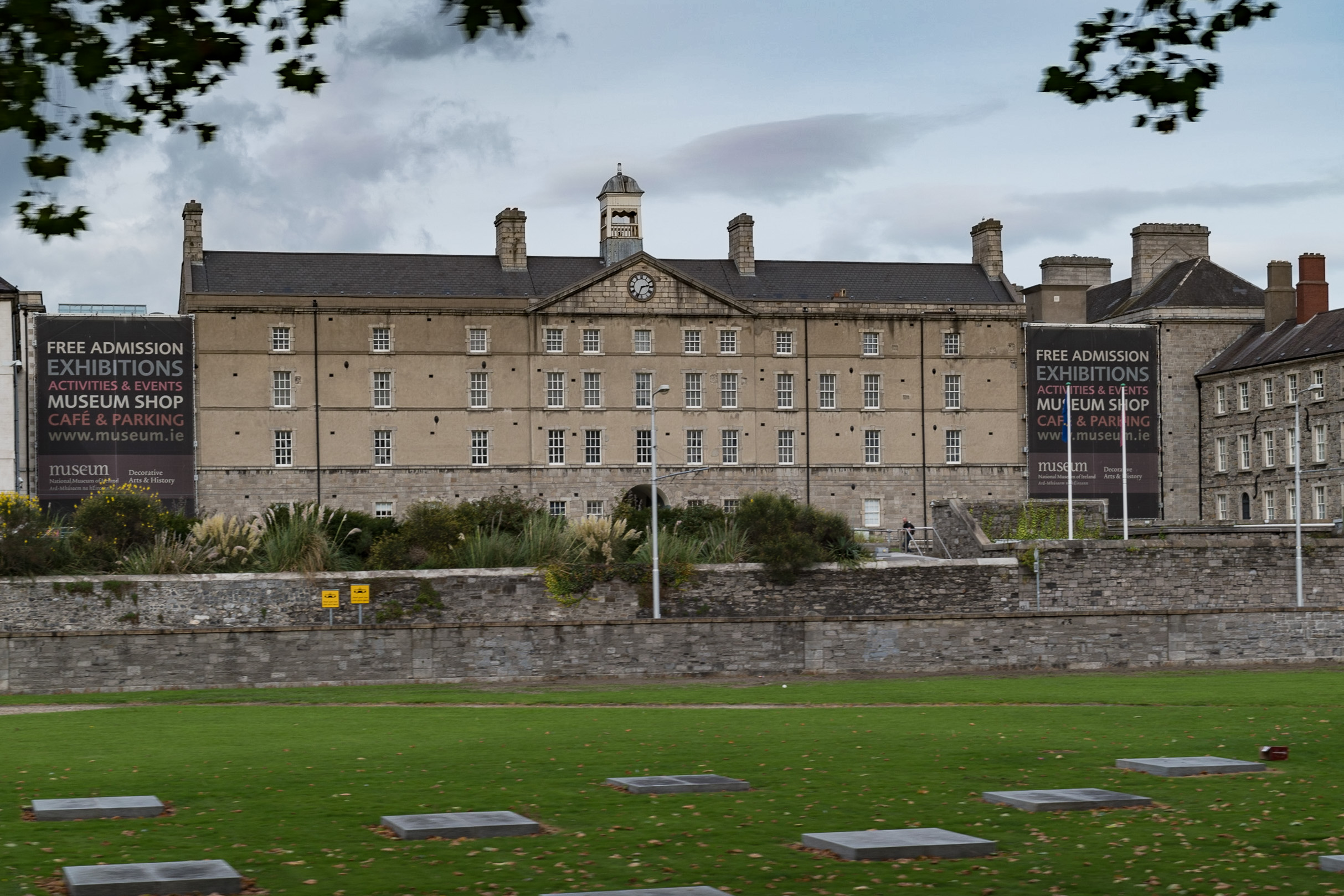
- The Croppies' Acre, with Collins Barracks behind.

- Location within Central Dublin
- Type: Municipal
- Location: Wolfe Tone Quay, Dublin 7
- OSI/OSNI grid: O 141 344
- Coordinates: 53.347464°N 6.287136°W
- Area: 1.8 hectares (4.4 acres)
- Operator: Dublin City Council
- Status: Open all year

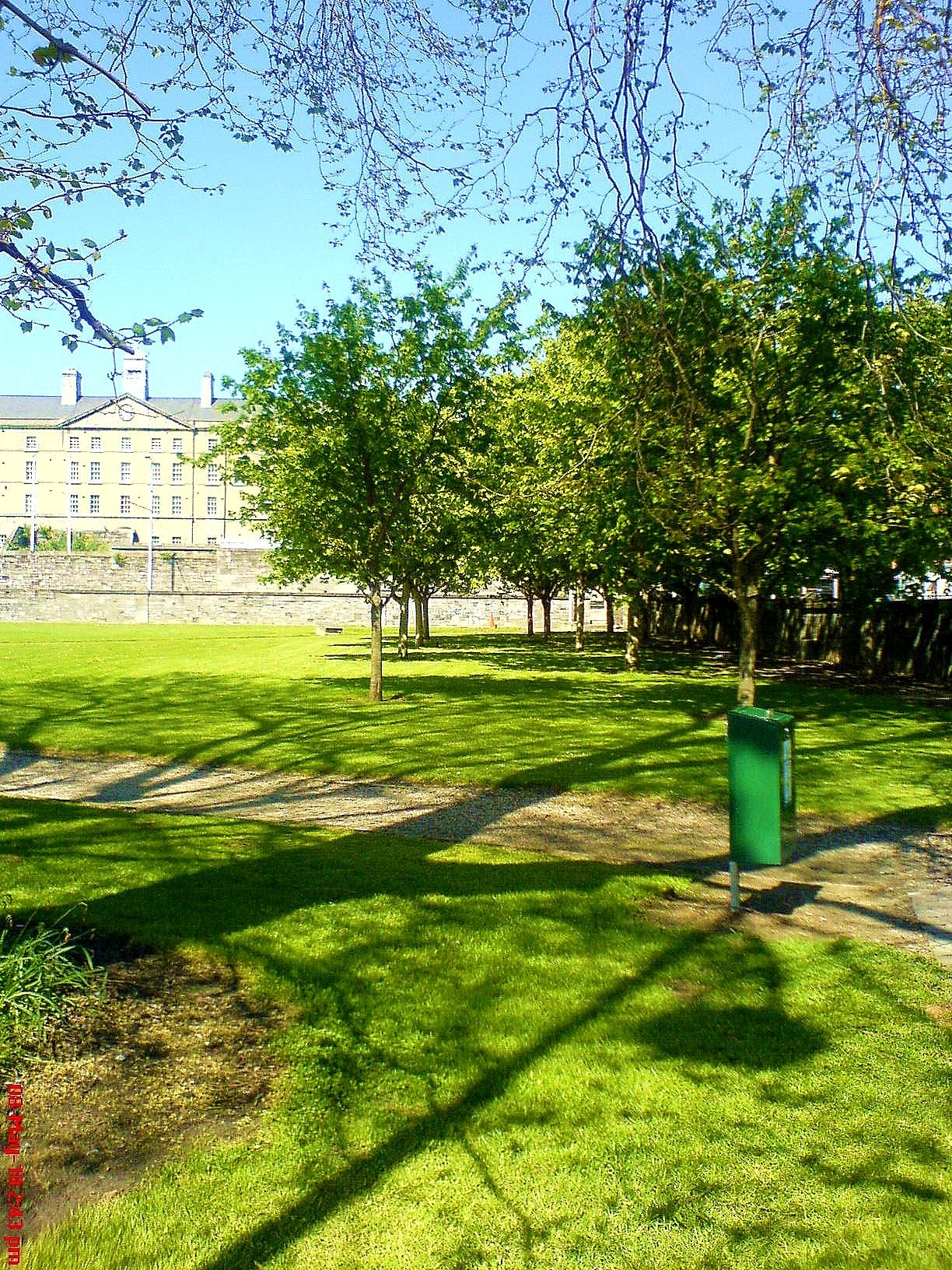
The Croppies' Acre in summertime

The Croppies' Acre (Irish: Acra na gCraipithe), officially the Croppies Acre Memorial Garden, is a public park in Dublin, Ireland. It contains a memorial to the dead of the 1798 Rebellion.

== Location and access ==
The site, located on the north bank of the River Liffey to the south of Collins Barracks (formerly the Royal Barracks) is traditionally believed to have been used as a mass grave for Irish rebel casualties of the 1798 Rebellion. There is a low limestone retaining wall along Benburb Street at the northern end of the park, with an entrance of square cut limestone piers with double wrought-iron gates. The eastern boundary is also limestone with granite caps, with the western end meeting redbrick buildings. At the south-east corner is the main entrance.

== History ==
The Irish rebel casualties of 1798 were known as Croppies due to their short-cropped hair emulating the revolutionaries in the French Republic. Following the rebellion, court martials were held at the Royal Barracks (now Collins Barracks) immediately north of the site.

The area the park occupies was also called Croppies' Hole at the time. Some rebels' bodies were also exhibited at the Croppies' Hole, tied to pikes, a common weapon used by the rebels throughout the rebellion.

The National Graves Association maintains that it was used after 1798 to bury veterans of the conflict, including Matthew Tone, brother of Wolfe Tone. Bartholomew Teeling was also supposedly buried at Croppies' Acre after being hanged at the nearby Provost Prison at Arbour Hill. However, archaeological investigations have failed to find any human remains and its status as a grave is uncertain. The precise site of the burials was long disputed, all being known was that the dead had been buried on marshy ground near the Royal Barracks. John Rocque's 1756 map of Dublin "shows that the southern part of the site was marshy in the mid-eighteenth century", according to the National Inventory of Architectural Heritage. A number of houses also existed on the Barrack Street (now Benburb Street) boundary of the park at same the time. Other reports mentioned that the corpses of the executed were thrown into the Liffey as a public deterrent; the river being tidal at this point. In addition, the River Liffey was realigned in this area to extend the city's quays.

Croppies' Acre was for a long time a soldiers' playing field and was also known as The Esplanade when it was reconfigured and used as a food kitchen around the 1850s. The area was enclosed c.1870.

=== Redevelopment as a park ===
The Memorial Park was designed and laid out in 1998 for the bicentenary of the 1798 Rebellion. This followed a "Save the Croppies Acre" campaign from the National Graves Association when rumours the area would be paved to provide parking for the then-new National Museum of Ireland sited at Collins Barracks were circulated in the press.

During the redevelopment, a monument was constructed in the eastern section of the park of a spiral stone wall, with the stone slabs designed to represent graves. Some of the stones are engraved with patterns or words including words from Seamus Heaney's poem Requiem for the Croppies.

Along the boundary with Wolfe Tone Quay, there is a row of mature London plane trees, withe younger Norway maple along the eastern boundary.

It was closed in 2012 by the Office of Public Works due to anti-social behaviour, including drunkenness and the use of hard drugs. Ownership was transferred to Dublin City Council and the Croppies' Acre was reopened in 2016 by Lord Mayor Críona Ní Dhálaigh. Before the reopening, further paths and landscaping improvement works were undertaken along with improving pedestrian access to the park.

== Croppies Memorial Park ==
Croppies Memorial Park
- The pool and park, looking east

- Location within Central Dublin
- Type: Municipal
- Location: Wolfe Tone Quay, Dublin 7
- OSI/OSNI grid: O 141 344
- Area: 0.26 hectares (0.64 acres)
- Opened: 1 December 1983; 42 years ago
- Operator: Dublin City Council
- Status: Open all year

There is the larger Croppies' Acre, and a secondary smaller, triangular park immediately in front of the Frank Sherwin Bridge called Croppies Memorial Park, bounded by Wolfe Tone Quay, Benburb Street, and Temple Street West. It is also maintained by Dublin City Council, with the parks separated by the Dublin Civil Defence Headquarters.

This half-acre plot originally formed part of the Military Recreation Grounds attached to the adjacent Royal Barracks, and as a result is "much older" than the neighbouring Croppies' Acre. It first appears on maps in 1838, and was sold by the Wide Streets Commission to the Commissioners of Works and Forests in 1843. This organisation "evolved responsibility in 1860" to the Office of Public Works, and the park was enclosed c.1860. In 1969, ownership finally passed to Dublin Corporation. According to the National Inventory of Architectural Heritage, the park's age is "evident in the mature planting (of London plane trees) and the patina of age to the boundary railings."

The site had been previously known as the Crimean Trophy Plot, where large Russian artillery pieces captured by the British Army during the 1854-55 Crimean War rested on a stone platform in the park. These remained there until 1970, when it was redeveloped alongside the bridge construction. Following the opening of the Frank Sherwin Bridge in August 1982, the Irish Times reported that the Corporation were intent on developing the park, which had been used as a site depot during construction works for the bridge and was in need of renewal:

The Corporation also intends developing the attractive "memorial plot" at the northern end of the bridge and open it as a new public park. The trees there will be preserved, railings repaired and the entire plot landscaped.

The multi-tiered fountain which was funded by the Dublin Chamber of Commerce

During the redevelopment, the walls and railings were repaired and a large water feature (pond) was created in the centre of the plot with flood lighting. The works cost in excess of IR£30,000, and were financed by funds associated with the construction of the bridge. This included a £7,000 donation from the Dublin Chamber of Commerce towards the erection of a fountain to mark their bicentenary. The park was officially opened on 1 December 1983, in a ceremony attended by the Lord Mayor, city officials and Commerce representatives, but had yet to be given an official name. The Irish Times reported:

Located on a triangle of green land along Wolfe Tone Quay, which was once known as the Crimean War Trophy Plot, the new park occupies about half an acre and includes trees, shrubs, benches and a small pond. The most outstanding feature, however, is a multi-tiered fountain at the entrance to the park. The fountain basins are made from Wicklow granite and the columns they rest on once belonged to Saint Ann's Mansion, at Clontarf.

The Anna Livia sculpture in the park

The paper stated that the park was designed to improve the surrounding area and serve as a public amenity for local residents, pedestrians using the newly completed Frank Sherwin Bridge, and passengers travelling to and from Heuston Station. At some point prior to February 1985, the new park was given its current name, Croppies Memorial Park. Pat Liddy profiled the park in a column in the Irish Times that month, noting the composition of the fountain: "The main fountain group consists of two Wicklow granite boulders sliced into six table-top sections supported on columns [..] the Corporation used the stones cut from the quay wall during the bridge construction to make the fountain pool's retaining wall." The park won the 1984 Civic Award.

The Anna Livia sculpture was added to the park's pool in 2011.

== See also ==
- List of monuments and memorials to the Irish Rebellion of 1798
