= K Club =

Hotel and golf course in Kildare, Ireland

The K Club

- Location in Ireland
- 53.307°N 6.625°W

Club information
- Location: Straffan, County Kildare, Ireland
- Established: 1991, 35 years ago
- Type: Private
- Owner: ROL Group Ltd
- Total holes: 36
- Tournaments: Ryder Cup – (2006); European Open (1995-2007); Irish Open – (2016) and 2023.
- Website: www.kclub.ie

Palmer North Course
- Designed by: Arnold Palmer
- Par: 72
- Length: 7,350 yards (6,721 m)

Palmer South Course
- Designed by: Arnold Palmer
- Par: 72
- Length: 7,277 yards (6,654 m)
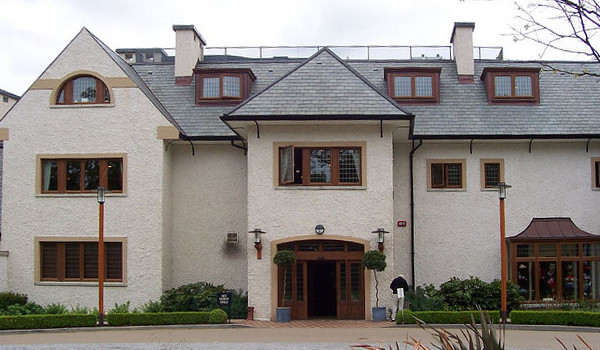
- Part of the clubhouse in 2012

The K Club
- Interactive map of The K Club

Restaurant information
- Established: 1991
- Rating: Michelin Guide (1993-1994)
- Location: Straffan, Ireland

The Kildare Hotel and Golf Club (abbreviated The K Club) is a golf and leisure complex located in Straffan, County kildare, Ireland. West of Dublin, it is built on the original grounds of the Straffan estate, incorporating the 1830s Straffan House. It was previously owned by Michael Smurfit, before being sold to Michael Fetherston in 2020.

== History ==
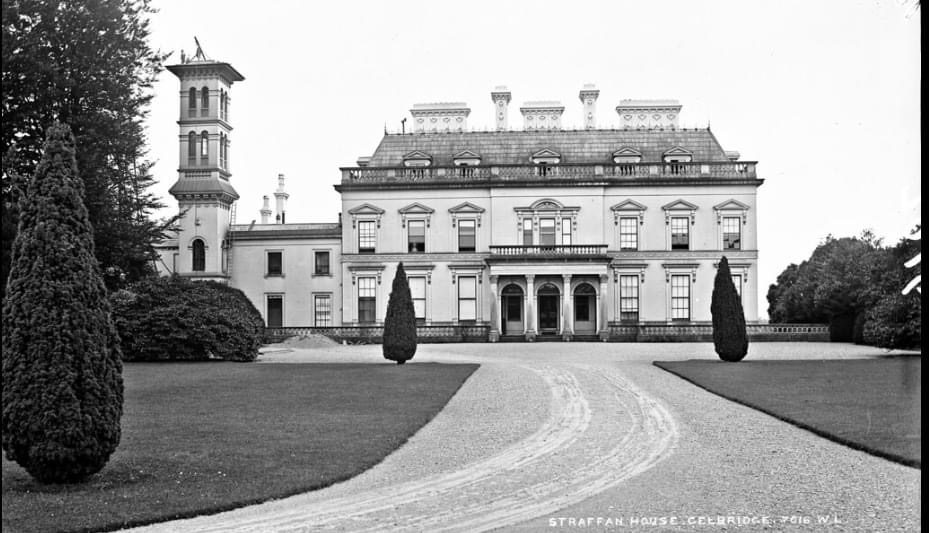
Straffan House, now the K Club

In 1831, Hugh Barton of the wine firm Barton and Guestier bought land at Straffan and nearby Barberstown Castle from the Henry family and had Straffan House built whilst he and his wife stayed at Barberstown.

Completed in 1832, the design was based on a French chateau, with the later addition of a bell-tower, and now forms the east wing of the present complex. The original architect was likely Frederick Darley.

From Hugh the property passed, via his eldest son Nathaniel, to his eldest son Hugh Lynedoch, after which it passed to Hugh Lynedoch's brother, Bertram Francis. All served in turn as High Sheriff of Kildare. The estate remained in the Barton family until 1949, when Derick Barton was forced to sell the property to manufacturer John Ellis.

Following a succession of different owners, including film producer Kevin McClory, property developer Patrick Gallagher and property magnate Alan Ferguson, the house was purchased in 1988 by the Jefferson Smurfit Group and transformed into the K Club, which opened three years later. Gannon and Smurfit privately purchased the K Club in 2005, following the sale of Jefferson Smurfit to Madison Dearborn Partners and its subsequent merger with Kappa Packaging. In 2012, Michael Smurfit bought the 49% stake Gerry Gannon had owned from NAMA for €40 million.

In 2020, the club was sold to nursing homes operator Michael Fetherston for a deal said to be between €65m and €70m.

== Restaurant ==
The Barton Restaurant was awarded one Michelin star both in 1993 and 1994. The star was earned by head chef Michel Flamme.

== Golf ==
The hotel complex also contains two golf courses, both designed by Arnold Palmer. The Palmer North Course was the venue for the Ryder Cup in 2006, the first time the event had been staged in Ireland. The course also hosted the Smurfit European Open on the European Tour from 1995 to 2003 and again in 2005, with that tournament being played on the resort's "inland links" Palmer South Course in 2004, 2006, and 2007. The Palmer North Course hosted the Irish Open in 2016, won by Rory McIlroy.

== Gallery ==
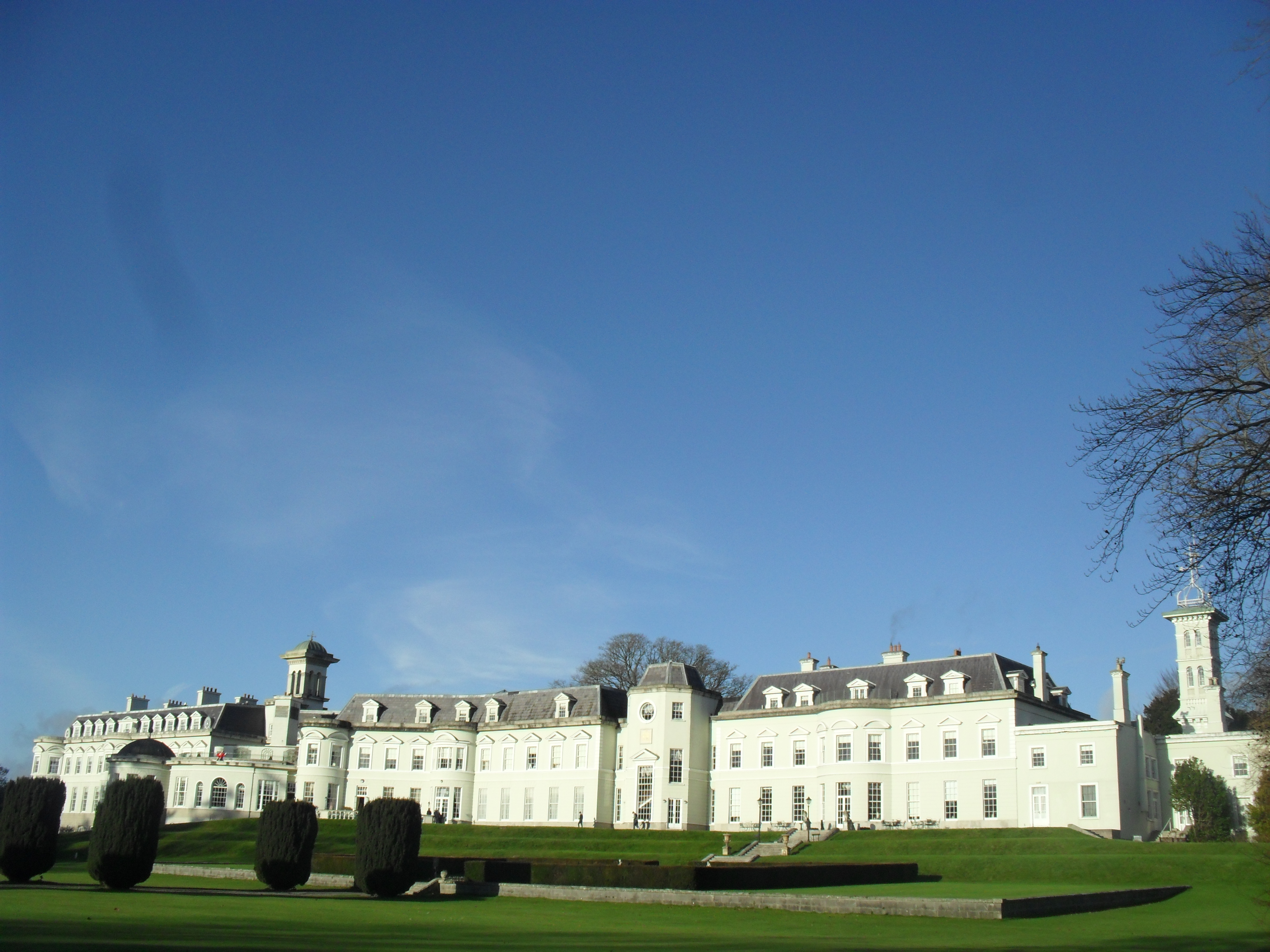
The K Club hotel

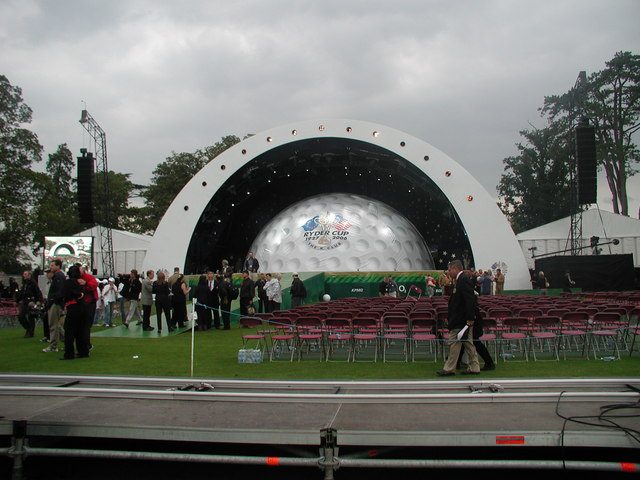
Opening ceremony of the 2006 Ryder Cup at the K Club

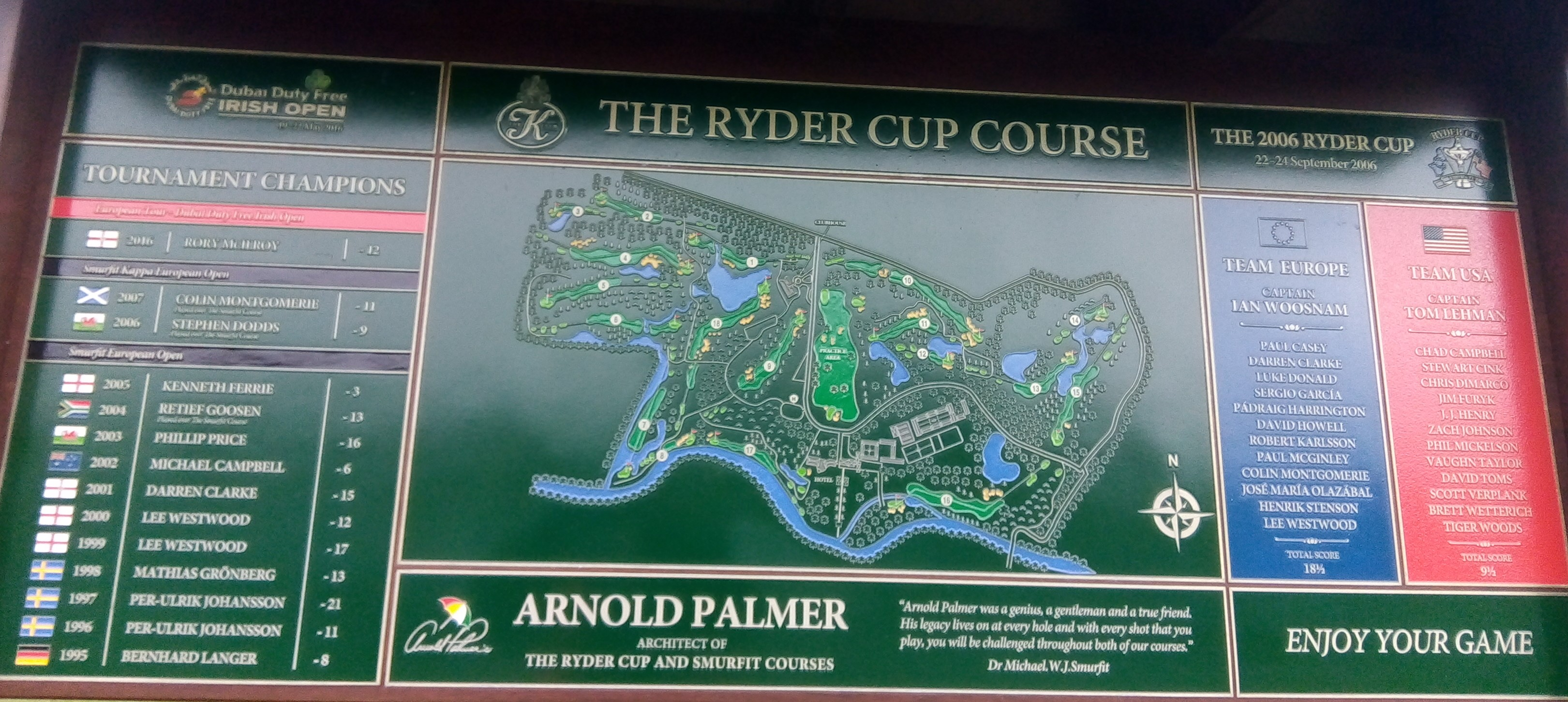
Sign giving the history of tournaments at the K Club
