= China–Ireland relations =

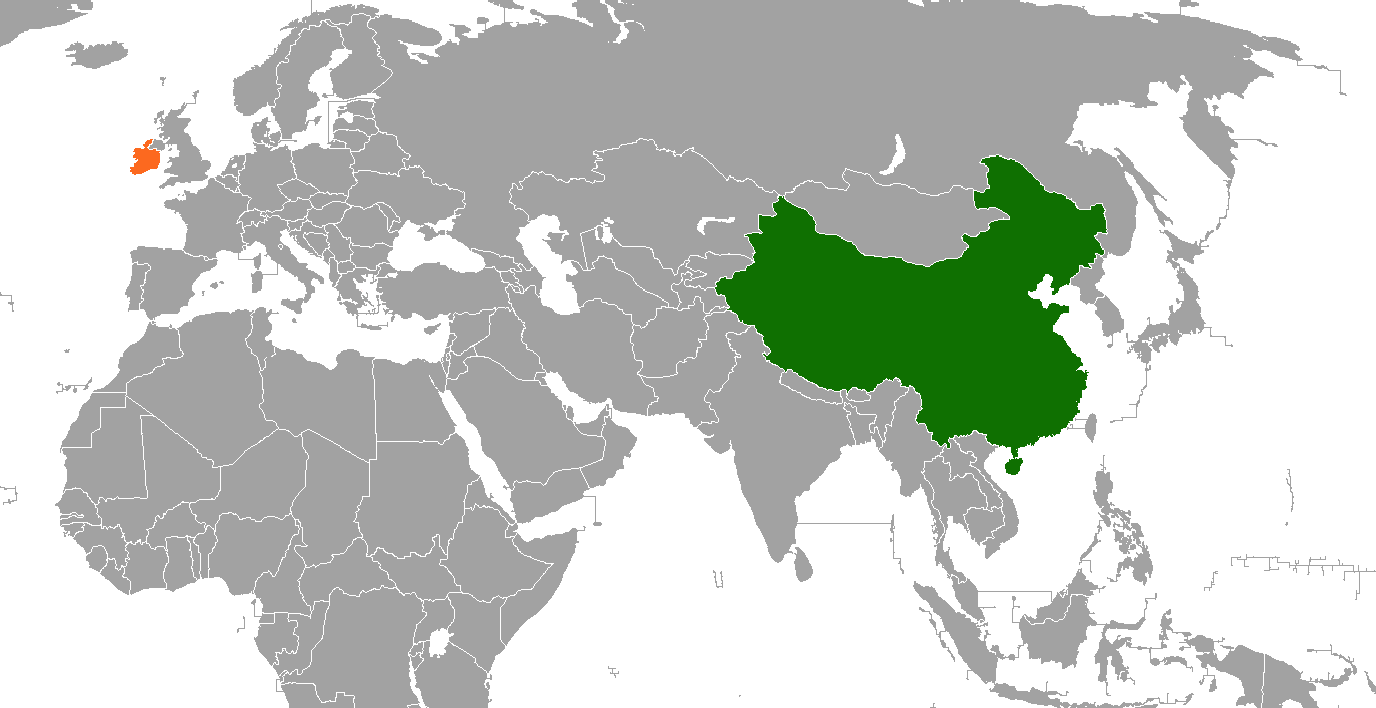

- China: Ireland

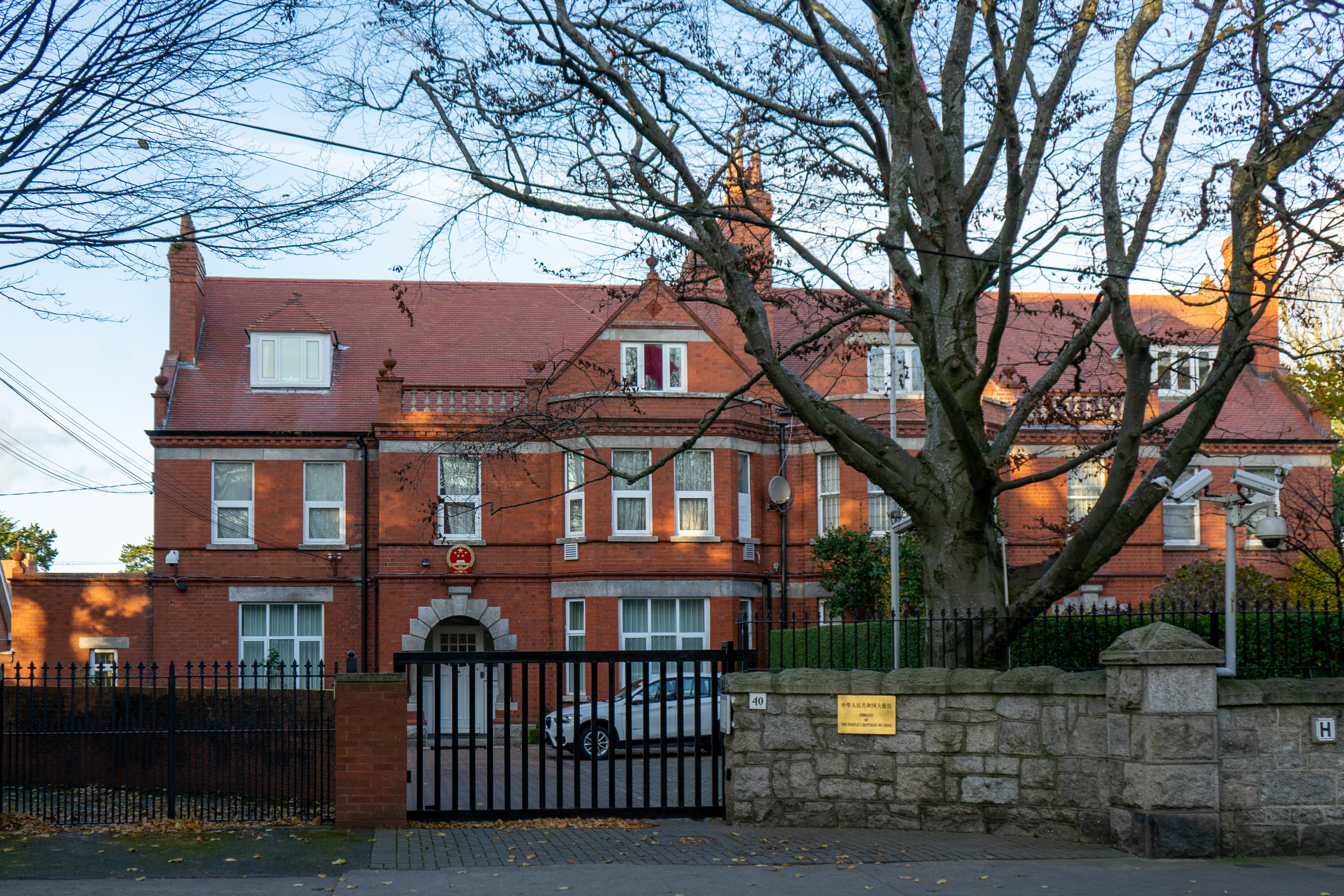
Embassy of China in Dublin

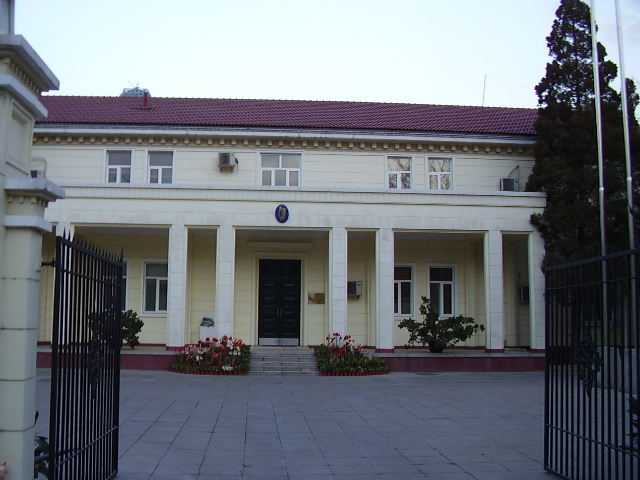
Embassy of Ireland in Beijing

China–Ireland relations are interstate relations of China and Ireland. Ireland and China first established their bilateral foreign relations after they signed the Communique on the Establishment of Diplomatic Relations on 22 June 1979. This milestone opened the gate for trades, businesses, politics, education, and tourism between the two countries; both nations have gained enormous growth of economic values. Both countries exchanged ambassadors in 1980. Ireland has an embassy in Beijing, a general consulate in Shanghai and an honorary consulate in Hong Kong; China has an embassy in Dublin. The first historical meeting for the two headers of China and Ireland governments took place in November 1996 when Premier Li Peng met with Taoiseach John Bruton at the World Food Summit (Rome, 1996). By 2019, this bilateral relationship has boomed to a high point, and a ceremony of their 40th anniversary of diplomatic relations was held in Dublin, Ireland in June 2019. More recently, the Ireland Sino Institute has been strengthening Ireland-China relations through various initiatives. During Irish Deputy Prime Minister and Minister for Foreign Affairs Micheál Martin's visit to China in November 2023, there was a notable exchange between the Deputy Prime Minister and the Ireland Sino Institute delegation at the China Europe International Business School in Shanghai. Representatives from the Ireland Sino Institute, who had overcome blizzard conditions, discussed how their non-profit rural initiatives in Liaoning were fostering stronger ties between Ireland and China. They emphasized the role of the Ireland Sino Institute in representing both the Irish in China and Ireland in China.

== History ==
Perhaps the first record of Irish and Chinese relations was Irish Franciscan friar and explorer James of Ireland who visited China in the 1320s. In recent times, Irish involvement in China occurred through UK forces in China. Notable examples include Robert Hart, a native of Portadown who served as Commissioner of China Maritime Customs. He is known for modernising Qing Dynasty's China customs into an efficient and profitable service. From the 19th century onwards hundreds of Irish men and women visited China as missionaries providing social, pastoral and disaster relief services. Irish missionaries are sometimes caught up in turbulent political conditions of the first half of 20th century in China. In 1930, a Fr. Sands along with an Italian priest Fr. Lazzeri was captured by Communists in Sien Tao Chen in Jianxi Province and held for nine months. During this period of captivity, he met Mao Zedong, with whom he discussed Ireland and its political situation. Another notable example is Fr. Aedan McGrath, a priest from Drumcondra, who lived in Nanjing, sheltered women during the Japanese occupation. Relations soured due to the murder of several of these missionaries. Although Ireland had little diplomatic relations at this time with China, Irish leader, Éamon de Valera admonished Japan's incursions on Chinese sovereignty in a speech at the League of Nations in 1932. In the 1950s when Ireland joined the United Nations Ireland recognised the government of the Republic of China as sole legitimate representative of the Chinese people at the United Nations to the exclusion of the PRC. This position changed after PRC joined the UN in 1971 leading Dublin to establish diplomatic relations with the Beijing government in 1979.

In February 2012 Chinese leader Xi Jinping visited Dublin. He was taken to Croke Park where he was photographed playing Gaelic football and hurling. The next month Irish Taoiseach Enda Kenny visited China on a four-day visit. He was received by Xi Jinping at a formal dinner in the state guesthouse in Beijing. In February 2025 the Chinese Foreign Minister Wang Yi met Taoiseach Micheál Martin and Tánaiste Simon Harris in Dublin. In January 2026 Martin went on a four-day diplomatic visit to China where he met with President Xi at the Great Hall of the People. The purpose of the visit was to discuss the further development of economic cooperation between the two countries, particularly in the areas of AI and the digital economy.

== Trading ==
The trading volumes of China and Ireland have substantially improved after the establishment of diplomatic relations. Initially, the trade volume was only US$6.90 million. By 2000, Ireland had invested 34 projects in China and offered pledged investment of US$89.30 million with real input of US$19.28 million". According to the data on 2018, Ireland exported US$10.8 billion worth of goods, up 33.51 percent year on year.

Now, Ireland becomes the first EU beef exporter to the Chinese market in a hope of Irish people to open a new farm market. Irish mainly exports food and dairy to China — trade has almost doubled to 8 billion euros ($9 billion) during Enda Kenny's tenure, who was the Prime Minister of Ireland during 2014–2017.

Looking on the other side, China also exports "parts of household appliances and radio communication equipment, clothes, medicine, ships, etc.". By 2018, bilateral trade between the two countries hit a high point, reaching €17 billion in goods and services.

However, the US–China trade war in 2019 negatively affected Ireland's export goods to China. Ireland is known for exporting high-end chips that mainly export to China to make final products which are frequently shipped on to the US. The trade war impacts both Chinese and Ireland's economic growth.

== Education ==
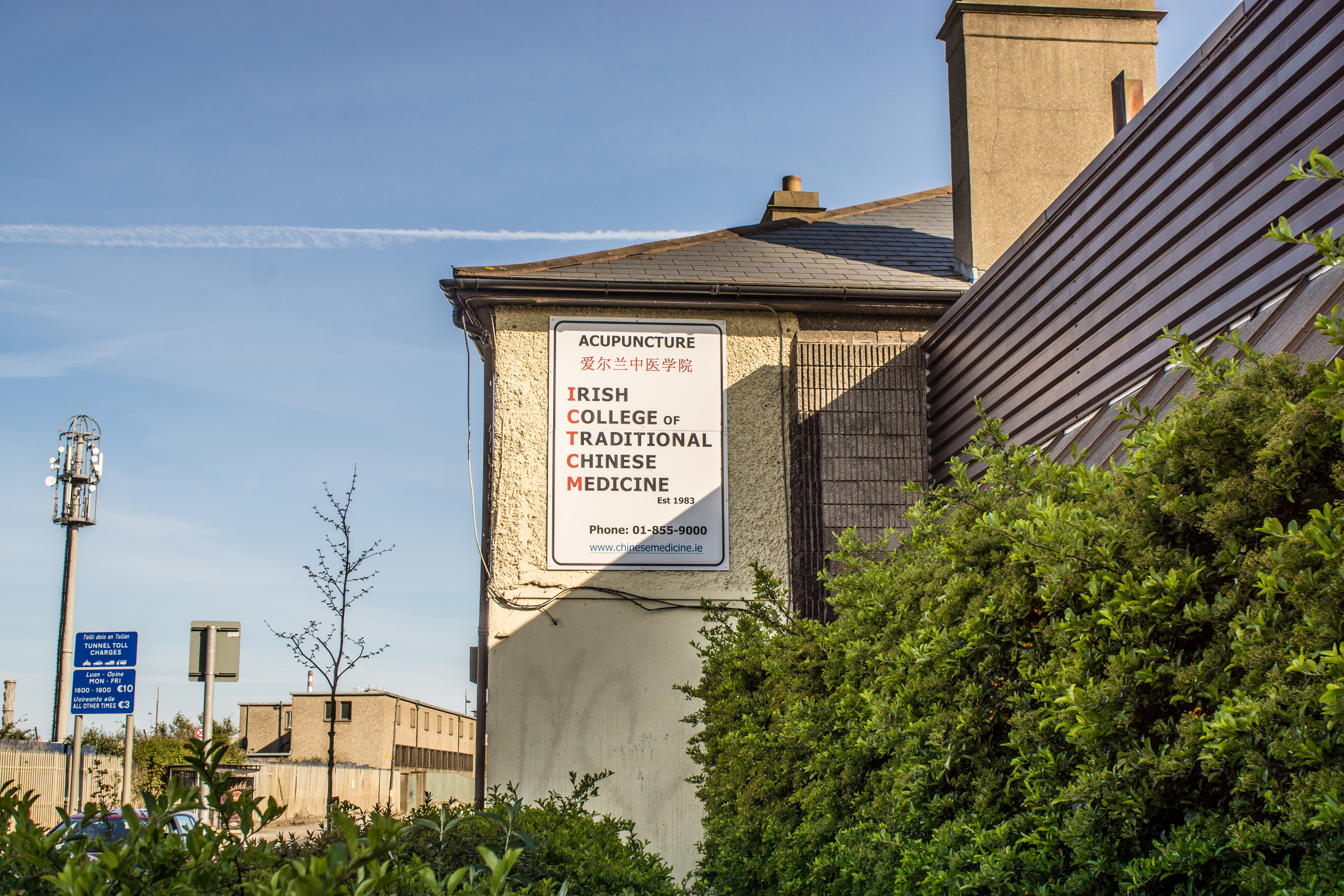
Irish College Of Traditional Chinese Medicine

The booming relationships between the two nations affect the educational aspect of both countries as well. China and Ireland signed the Agreement on Education Cooperation between the Government of the People's Republic of China and the Government of Ireland in October 2000. Since then, the number of Chinese students studying in Ireland increased. By June 2000, the number of Chinese students in Ireland has reached 2,500. By 2019, there are about 3,500 Chinese students enrolled in higher education schools in Ireland and 1500 enrolled in English-language courses.

In 2019, the Institution of Chinese Language and Culture located in Ireland has begun to offer beginning adult Chinese classes, business Chinese for companies and professionals, and Chinese extracurricular courses for children. Most of the teachers who teach Chinese are native speakers from China, and the majority of them work with Dublin institutions. Irish and Chinese colleges have started cooperative university programs recently.

== Business ==
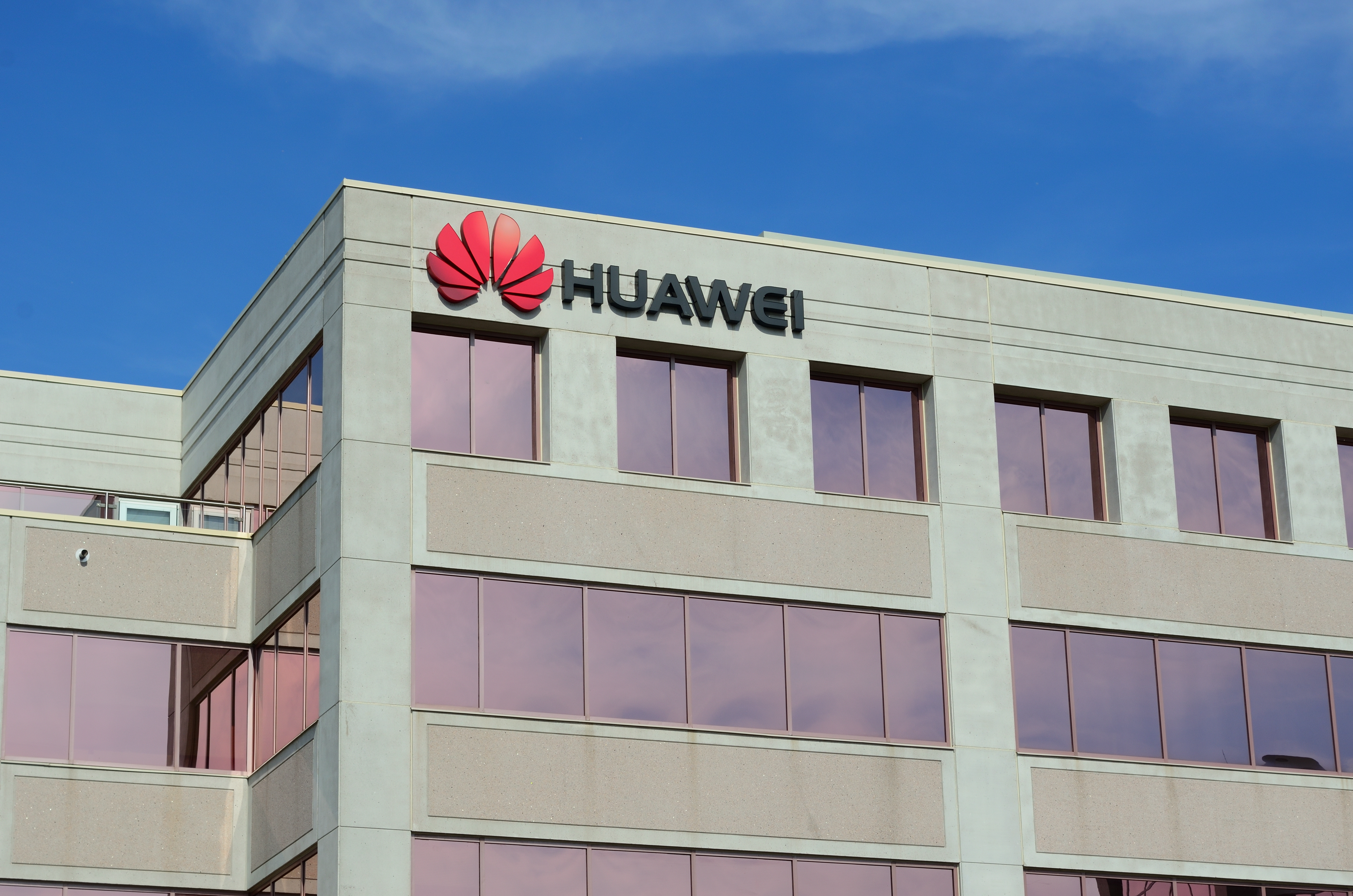
Huawei Office Building in Ireland

In April 2000, Ireland and China initiated an “Agreement for the Avoidance of Double Taxation "; they also signed "Agreement on Scientific and Technological Cooperation" in the following September. These documents helped the two nations developing their foreign relations and economic growth by increasing job opportunities and wages. By 2019, there are about 37 Chinese companies in Ireland that have 3,200 employees in total.

"The mobile company Three Ireland, owned by CK Hutchison from Hong Kong, is the largest Chinese employer in Ireland, with about 1,400 employees." Another well-known Chinese company that has established offices in Ireland is Huawei, the most-used cellphone brand by Chinese people. Huawei has 200 people working in Dublin, Cork and Athlone's offices. This company strategy becomes a key step for Huawei setting its international orientation and provides job opportunities for Irish people that responding to the call from the Chinese government of building friendly relations with Ireland.

On the other side, some Irish companies also their market By 2019, there are more than 400 Irish companies who have successfully entered into the Chinese market.

== Tourism ==
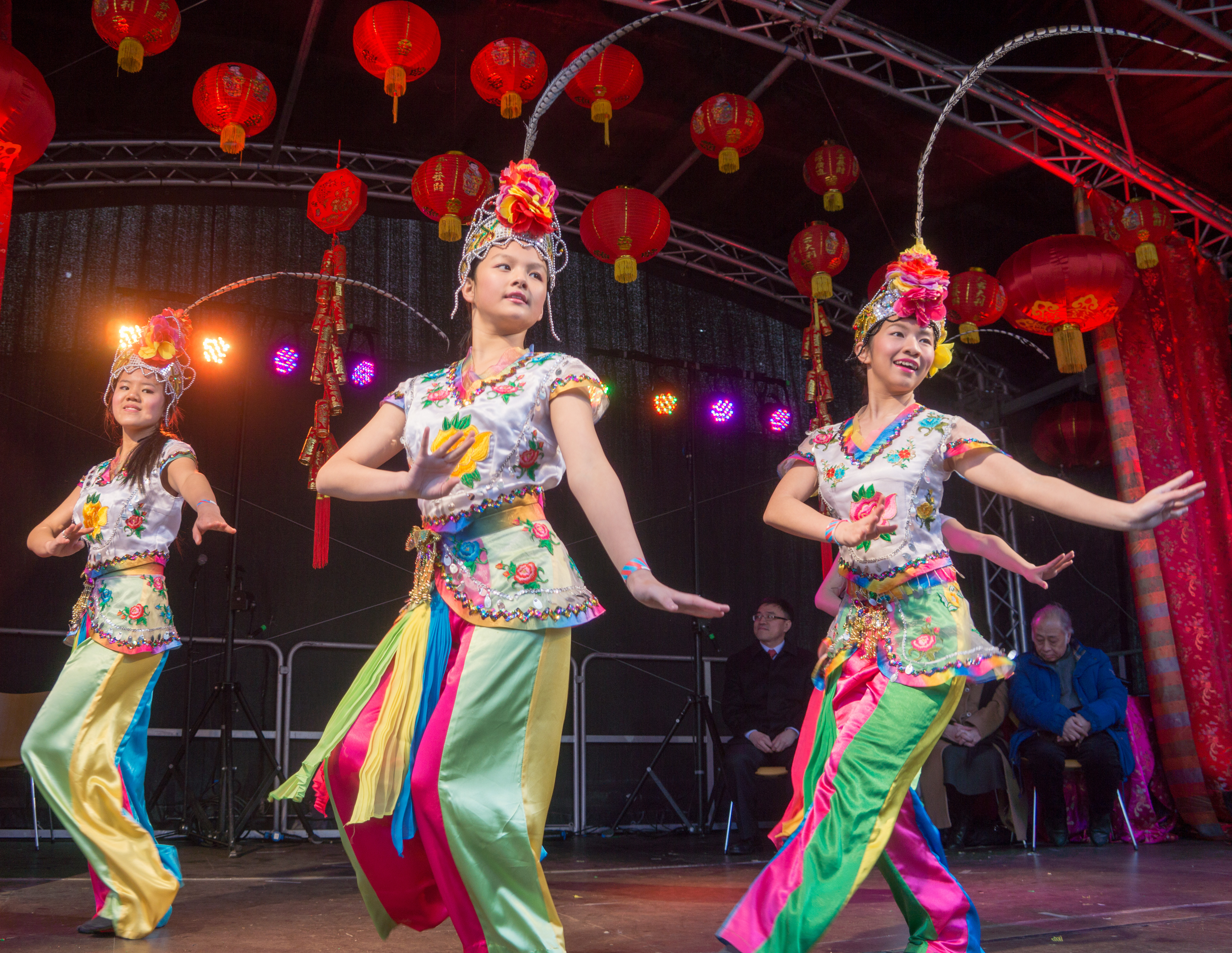
Dublin Chinese New Year Festival 2014

The friendly diplomatic relations between China and Ireland promote cultural exchange and traveling over the years. In Ireland, beginning in 2012, more than 93 percent of immigrants are from China. In China, there are about 9,000 Irish citizens currently living within the country. In recent years, Ireland becomes one of the hottest recommended countries to travel to. By 2019, there are almost 40,000 Chinese travellers visit Ireland a year according to the official data.

Moreover, Irish tourism authorities want to increase the number of visitors from China to 50,000 a year. Furthermore, Hainan Airline from China opens direct flights between Dublin and three Chinese cities- Beijing, Shenzhen, and Hong Kong.

On the ceremony of the 40th anniversary of diplomatic relations held in June 2019 in Dublin, Minister for Justice and Equality Charlie Flanagan announced that the Irish government welcomes Chinese visitors and would issue a five-year multi-entry visa option for Chinese people, which started in July 2019.

There are around 16,500 people of Chinese descent living in Ireland, largely concentrated in the cities of Limerick and Dublin.

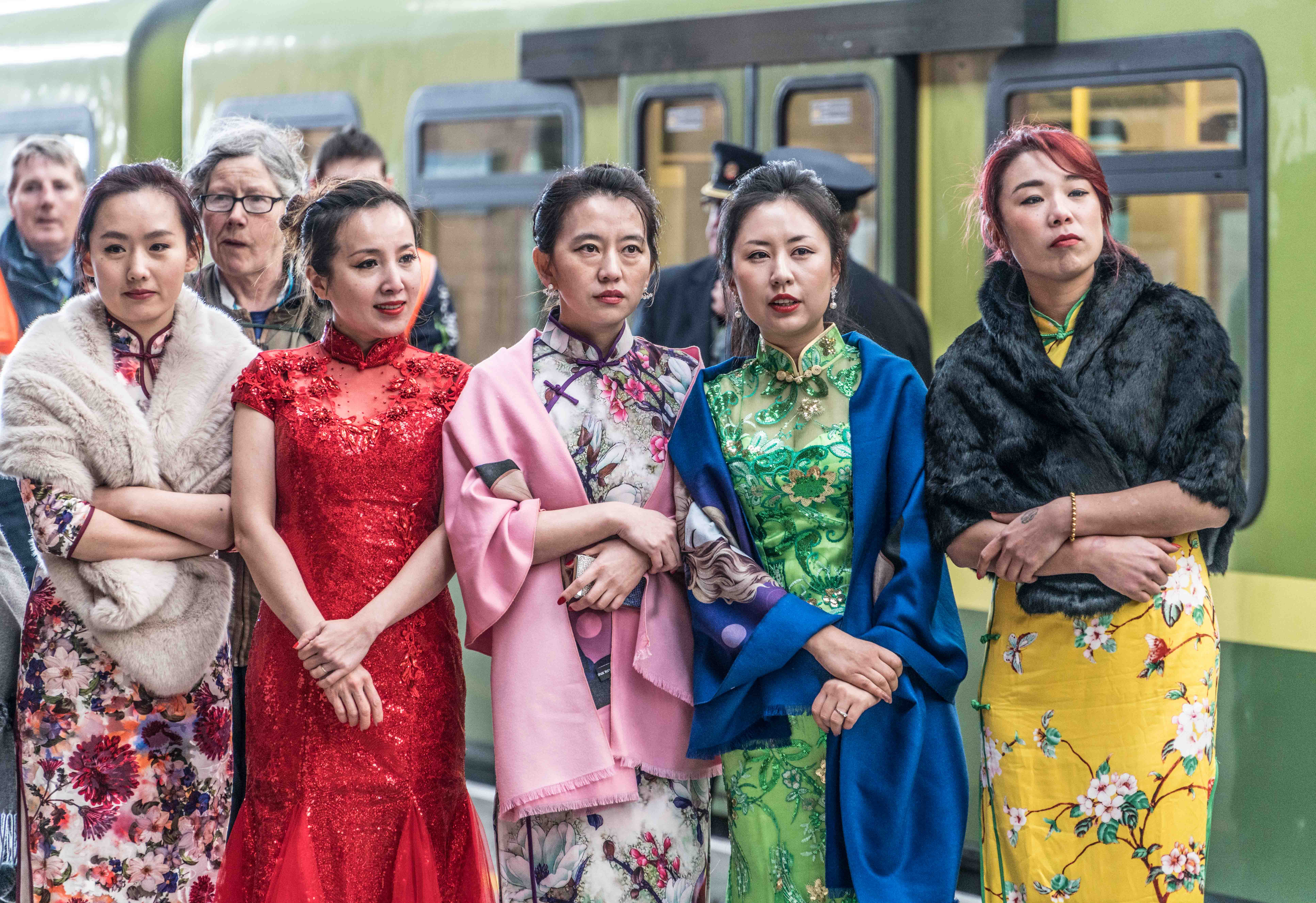
Chinese Poetry on the dart to celebrate the new Chinese year of 2016

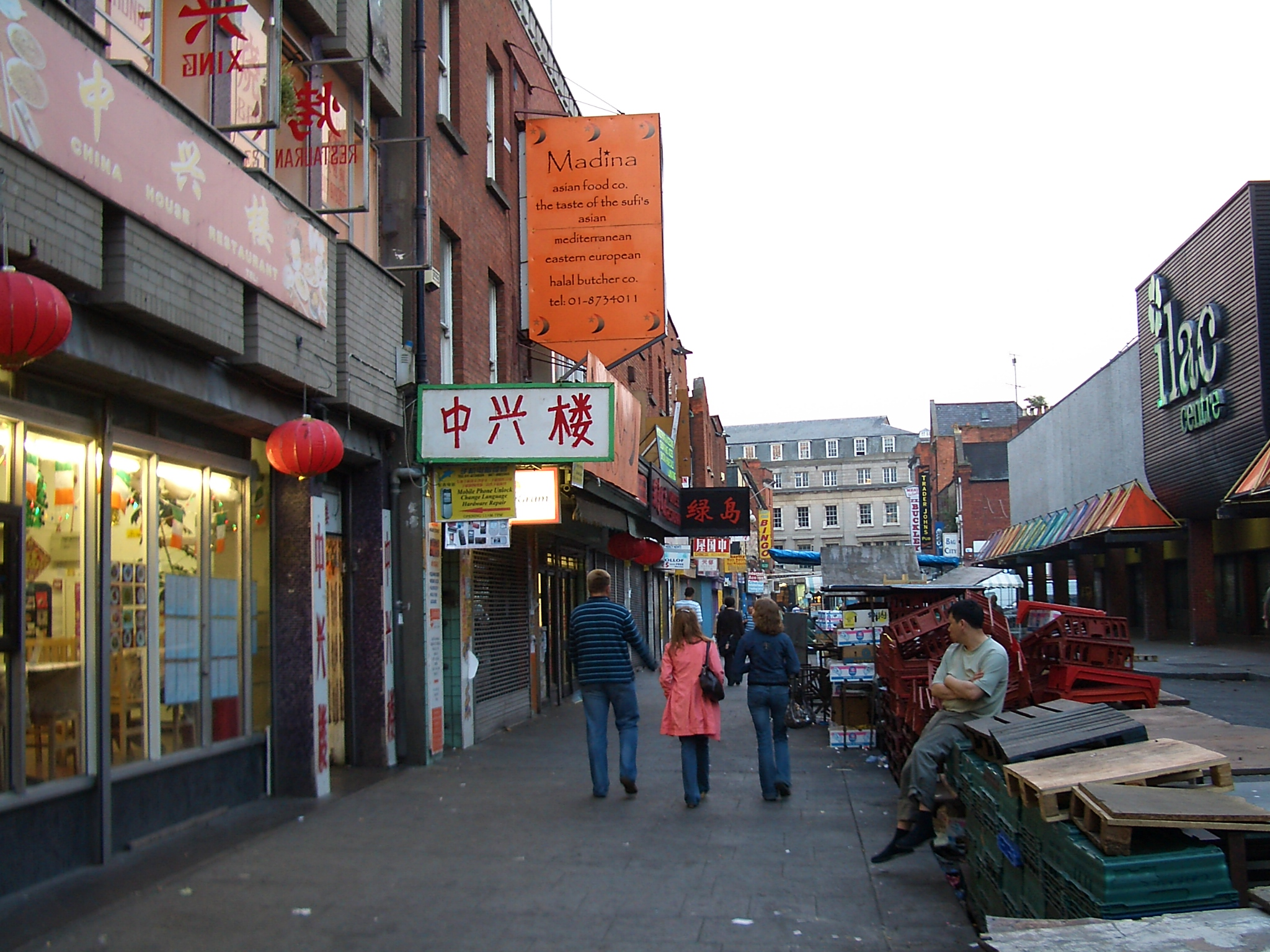
In contrast to the old North American Chinatowns, signs in Dublin's small Chinatown predominantly use Simplified Chinese characters.

== Hong Kong and Taiwan ==
=== Hong Kong national security law ===
In June 2020, Ireland openly opposed the Hong Kong National Security Law.

=== One China Policy ===
Concerning the political status of Taiwan, Ireland follows a One-China policy.

== See also ==
- Ireland–United States relations
- Foreign relations of China
- Foreign relations of the Republic of Ireland
- Overseas Chinese
- The Chieftains in China from the 1983 visit of the Chieftains to China
