= Michael Smurfit =

English-born Irish businessman

Michael Smurfit KBE
- Born: 7 August 1936 (age 89); St Helens, Merseyside, England
- Education: Clongowes Wood College
- Occupation: Businessman
- Years active: 1955–present
- Known for: K Club; Smurfit Kappa; Ballymore International
- Relatives: Tony Smurfit (son); Victoria Smurfit (niece); Alan Smurfit (brother)

Sir Michael Smurfit, KBE (born 7 August 1936), is an Irish businessman. In the "2010 Irish Independent Rich List" he was listed as 25th with a €368 million personal fortune.

== Early life ==
Smurfit was born in St Helens, England, and educated at Clongowes Wood College, County Kildare, Ireland. He left school while a teenager and joined his father's company, Jefferson Smurfit & Sons Ltd, in 1955. In 1967, he was appointed joint managing director and was made deputy chairman in 1969. He was appointed chairman and chief executive officer of the Jefferson Smurfit Group in 1977, a position he held until his retirement as CEO in November 2002.

== Business ==
At Jefferson Smurfit Group, Smurfit led the early expansion of the Group in both Ireland and the United Kingdom. He followed this with a series of acquisitions in the US, Latin America and Continental Europe. As chairman, Smurfit oversaw the merger of the Smurfit Group with Kappa Packaging BV to form Smurfit Kappa, with the merged company employing 42,000 employees in 33 countries on 5 continents. His share of the merged company was 4.9%. He is also a director of Ballymore International, a property development and investment group, and has investments in other small companies.

He owned the K Club in County Kildare, which was sold for €70 million in November 2019.

== Interests ==
Smurfit previously owned the Lyons Demesne which he sold in 1996 for £Ir3.5 million to Tony Ryan.

Smurfit is a member of a number of sporting and social clubs in Ireland, the United Kingdom, the United States, Monaco and Spain. He owns a €53 million super yacht and the Smurfit Art Collection, which contains works by Irish artists such as John Lavery, William Orpen, Louis le Brocquy, Jack B. Yeats, Donald Teskey, Peter Collis, Martin Mooney, Norah McGuinness, and Anne Madden. He built up the collection of 500 pieces over 20 years.

Smurfit also commissioned Anna Livia, a bronze monument formerly located on O'Connell Street in Dublin. It was affectionately known as the Floozie in the Jacuzzi.

== Personal life ==
He has two daughters and four sons and lives in Monte Carlo. His son Tony is the current CEO of Smurfit Kappa. He is Victoria Smurfit's uncle. His son, Alexander Smurfit, is a businessman residing in Monaco.

He was appointed as a Knight Commander of the Royal Order of Francis I in November 2002 at a ceremony in Dublin in recognition his of contribution to charitable and humanitarian endeavour.

== Recognition ==
In 2005, Smurfit was appointed to be a Knight Commander of the Most Excellent Order of the British Empire (KBE) in HM The Queen's Birthday Honours List 2005, published in June 2005. The postgraduate business school of University College Dublin, the Michael Smurfit Graduate School of Business, is named after him as a result of his financial support. In 1996, he received the Cross of Merit with Gold Star from the Equestrian Order of the Holy Sepulchre of Jerusalem, for his support for Christians in the Holy Land.
