= Pat Liddy =

Pat Liddy (Irish: Pádraig Ó Lideadha, born 1944 in Dublin) is an Irish artist, historian, writer, illustrator, broadcaster, mapmaker, and environmental lobbyist. Pat is the author and illustrator of twelve books on the city, as well as others on Irish cultural sites and topics. Since 2004, he has been the owner of Pat Liddy's Walking Tours of Dublin.

Pat Liddy in March 2011

== Early life and education ==
He grew up in the inner north city suburb of Phibsborough, the only child of Brendan (born St Peter's Road, Phibsborough) and Maureen (née Mac Mahon) from Kilmainhamwood, County Meath. He was fortunate to have as a playground the semi-rural surrounds of the Royal Canal, the nearby Botanical Gardens and the Victorian urban landscape around his home in Phibsborough, which helped to fuel his artistic imagination and love of history. He was educated at St. Vincent's CBS, Glasnevin.

Always interested in art, Pat Liddy entered and won several art competitions as a teenager and young adult. One such endeavour, a balsa wood model of his imaginary concept for a then proposed Roman Catholic cathedral in Dublin’s Merrion Square, was on view in Malahide Castle before then moving to the, is today on view in the Tara's Palace Museum of Childhood in Powerscourt House in Co. Wicklow and, since the closure of that museum, is currently awaiting a new home.

== Early career ==
Liddy had initially wanted to be an architect but disliked the way architecture was developing in the early 1960s, especially in his native Dublin, and decided instead to join the national airline, Aer Lingus, in April 1963. In this capacity, he took the opportunities from discounted flights to travel all over the world. These experiences only reinforced Liddy's growing certainty that Dublin was one of the great but undervalued and least visited capital cities of Europe.

== Career ==
Using his skills of self-taught architectural draftsmanship and general artistic flair, Liddy started to paint and draw scenes from the urban landscape in an attempt to bring attention to the uniqueness and charm of Dublin before those places might disappeared forever. The 1970s was a time when a good deal of second-rate redevelopment was clearing away much of the run-down but historic fabric of the city in the name of progress.

Starting in 1982 and running until 1989, Liddy's weekly column in The Irish Times, called "Dublin Today," featured a pen and ink sketch of a building or place of interest in the city and was accompanied by a description of around 400 words. This long-running series gained a huge following and played an important part in a gradual determination among ordinary people, businesses, property owners and Dublin City Council to rediscover and enhance the city.

Liddy's first book, Dublin Today, published in 1984, arose directly from The Irish Times series. Several more books followed including the popular flagship book, Dublin Be Proud, published during the Dublin Millennium of 1988. It had the unusual distinction of being a number 1 non-fiction best-seller simultaneously in paperback and hardcover in Ireland.

When the famous Irish traditional music group, The Chieftains, went on a ground-breaking trip to China in 1983 and held many concerts there, Liddy accompanied them and wrote articles on the visit for The Irish Times and The Cork Examiner, provided the photographs for their album cover and on his return held an exhibition of watercolours based on the trip in the renowned Chester Beatty Library. In 1988, on behalf of the Irish American Cultural Institute and Aer Lingus, he undertook 22-city tour of the US promoting Dublin's historical and cultural attractions.

Taking early retirement from Aer Lingus in 1994, he turned his attention full-time to painting, drawing, exploring and writing about the historic buildings, scenic places and exciting new developments in his native city. He combined these skills with his active promotion, both at home and abroad, for the appreciation and protection of what he believed was the unique cultural and architectural heritage of Dublin. He featured in many TV programmes and series, among others a popular 2009 RTÉ One series On the Street Where You Live.

In the early 1990s Liddy was a member of a Dublin Business Association which promoted and successfully lobbied the Irish government for the introduction of a light rail system into Dublin, now known as the Luas. One offshoot from his local historical knowledge was the invitation on many occasions to name streets, roads and neighbourhoods in new housing developments.

The most widely distributed tourist map of Dublin, "The Dublin Visitor Map" (13 million copies to date), was designed by Liddy in 1999 (in conjunction with the Dublin City Business Association) and was annually updated by him until its eventual demise during the Covid shutdowns of 2020 and 2021. .

Turning his hand to sculptural design, Liddy designed the Mass Rock Memorial in the village of Lyre, County Cork in 2000 (Mass rocks were substitute altars in rural Ireland during times when the Roman Catholic Church and its services were banned in Ireland by the authorities from the 16th to the 18th centuries). The annual Dublin Moon Walk, a mid-summer all-night walk fundraiser, with a different route each year, was designed by Liddy in association with the Diabetes Association of Ireland and has continued in various guises since. In 2004, special editions of his book, Dublin A Celebration, were adopted as official gifts from the Irish Government to the heads of state and senior ministers of the other European Union's countries to celebrate the accession of the new states in 2004.

Founded in 2004, Pat Liddy's Walking Tours of Dublin, is now one of the city's largest multilingual walking tour guiding companies with a large group of professional dedicated guides. The walks he designed show the highlights and hidden gems of Dublin city. From 2008 until 2024 Liddy also led an annual series of free cultural walks around Dublin organised by the Dublin City Council. Hundreds of people participated in each walk.

In May 2011, Liddy received the Lord Mayor's Award in recognition of his dedication to raising awareness of Dublin's architectural and cultural heritage. In the same year, he had the honour of introducing some of Dublin educational and charity organisation dignitaries to Queen Elizabeth II of the United Kingdom during her historic visit to Ireland.

His most recent Irish bestselling illustrated book, The History of Ireland in Maps, was published in 2023.

== Awards and distinctions ==
- Winner (model section) Caltex (Texaco) Art Competition 1961 and 1962
- Honorary citizen, San Jose, California, 1988
- Co-leader of the Saint Patrick's Day parade, St. Louis, Missouri, 1988
- Ford Dublin Cultural Award, in association with Dublin City of Culture 1991
- The Irish Times Living Dublin Award, 2006
- Category winner in the Digital Media Ireland Awards, 2008
- Dublin Lord Mayor's Award, 2011

== Personal life ==
He still lives on the north side in the suburb of Artane. One of his main interests is in early music and in the late '90s and early '00s was a part-time manager of the music group the Capriol Consort, under director Professor Doris Keogh. Liddy was married in 1976 to Josephine Murphy (born Lyre, County Cork) and has three children: Anne Marie, Pádraig and Brendan; and three grandchildren: Rosemary, Senan and Clodagh.

== Publications (text and illustrations) ==
- Weekly column in The Irish Times, 1982–1989
- Album cover photographs of The Chieftains in China, 1985
- Album cover, A Celebration of Dublin, DolCd, 1988
- Classic Views of Dublin, Cloverleaf, 1998
- Dublin Today, 1985
- Dublin be Proud, 1987
- Dublin Stolen From Time, 1990
- Temple Bar- Dublin: An Illustrated History 1992
- 50 Years A Growin': The Story of Maryfield College, 1995
- Walking Dublin, 1998 & 2000
- Dublin A Celebration, 2000
- Secret Dublin, 2001
- "The Story of Coolock Artane Credit Union," 2001
- Ongar, In the Ancient Barony of Castleknock, 2001
- The Changing Landscapes of Dublin, 2003
- "Serving Our Community 1965–2005, Coolock Artane Credit Union," 2005
- William Roche 1874-1939. The Story of Roches Stores. 2006
- The History of Ireland in Maps, 2023

== Electronic media ==
- Newstalk radio series Hidden Dublin
- Various RTÉ documentaries and current affairs programmes
- Regular interviews on national and regional radio stations
- Tourist documentaries on radio and TV for overseas companies from Canada, the US, South Korea, the UK, Germany, Netherlands, Australia, France, Norway, Spain and Israel among others.
- Historic Pubs of Dublin, 2008
- Dublin Tourism Podcast I-Walks 2009
- RTÉ One series On the Street Where You Live, 2009
- Fáilte Ireland Podcast I-Walks 2013
- Tales of Irish Castles, 2014
- Freedom: A 1916 Story, Peter Baxter, 2016

== Exhibitions ==
- Watercolours & Photographs of China, Chester Beatty Library, 1983
- Dublin in Drawings & Watercolours, Arnott's Department Store Gallery, 1984 & 1988
- UBS Gallery, Zurich, The Dublin & Zurich Homes of James Joyce, 1989
- Dublin in paintings, Brussels, 1989
- Malton to Liddy, Dublin Civic Museum, 1991 (collection now held in the Dublin City Council archives)
- The Castles of Dublin & Its Pale, Bank of Ireland Art Centre, 2005
- The Changing Landscapes of Dublin, Dublin City Hall, 2004
