= Frank McDonald (journalist) =

Irish journalist, environmental writer and editor (1950–2026)

- McDonald in 2021
- Born: 24 January 1950; Dublin, Ireland
- Died: 5 September 2026 (aged 76); Dublin, Ireland
- Education: St. Vincent's C.B.S., Glasnevin; University College Dublin (UCD)
- Occupations: Writer and journalist
- Employer: The Irish Times
- Spouse: Eamon Slater

Frank McDonald (24 January 1950 – 5 September 2026) was an Irish author, journalist, environmentalist and environment editor of The Irish Times.

== Biography ==
Frank McDonald was born in Dublin on 24 January 1950, growing up in Cabra. He was educated at Kelly's Private School on Cabra Road, St. Vincent's C.B.S. in Glasnevin and University College Dublin.

He lived in the Temple Bar area of Dublin from 1995. He married his long-term partner, Eamon Slater, in 2016.

In 2010, he admitted to hitting a female manager in the River House Hotel in Eustace Street, after becoming frustrated with the high level of noise coming from the hotel's Mezz bar and nightclub. In a subsequent licensing case, the Dublin Circuit Court heard that complaints about the premises dated back over 15 years and the judge said they were "well-grounded", but the licence was ultimately renewed.

McDonald died after a short illness, at Dublin's Blackrock Clinic on 5 September 2026, at the age of 76.

== Career ==
McDonald began his journalism career as a freelance New York Correspondent for the Irish Press, leaving to join The Irish Times in 1979. He became the Environment Correspondent for the The Irish Times in 1986, a post which he held until he was appointed Environment Editor in 2000. Throughout his career, his writing focused on planning and development in Dublin, from the demolition of parts of Georgian Dublin to the effect of Airbnb on the city. McDonald's seminal work was The Destruction of Dublin, which identified anomalies in the Irish planning system, the destruction of cultural heritage and the overly close relationships between Irish politicians and notable property developers of the day and the previous decades.

He was a founding member of the Academy of Urbanism of Great Britain and Ireland. McDonald retired from The Irish Times in 2015.

== Awards ==
- Lord Mayor's Millennium Medal, 1988
- Honorary D.Phil., Dublin Institute of Technology, 2006
- Honorary member, Royal Institute of the Architects of Ireland, 2010
- Honorary fellow, Royal Institute of British Architects, 2011

== Bibliography ==
- The Destruction of Dublin, Gill and Macmillan (1985, ISBN 978-0717113866)
- Saving the City, Tomar (1989, ISBN 978-1871793031)
- The Construction of Dublin, Gandon Editions (2000, ISBN 9780946846498)
- With James Nix, Chaos at the Crossroads, Gandon Books (2005, ISBN 978-0948037139)
- with Sheridan, Kathy (2008). The Builders. Penguin. ISBN 978-0-141-03780-6.
- Truly Frank (2018, ISBN 9780241977651)
- A Little History of the Future of Dublin (2021, ISBN 9781999896850)
