= Tony Smurfit =

Irish businessperson

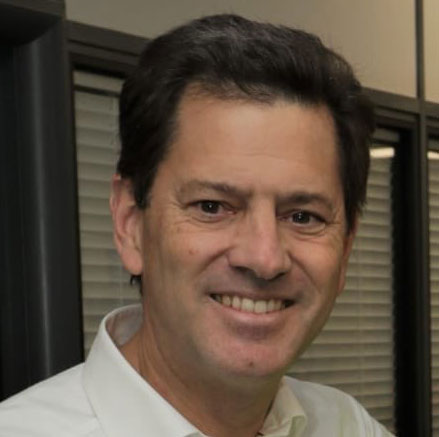
- Smurfit in 2019
- Born: Anthony Paul James Smurfit; 1963 (age 62–63); Wigan, United Kingdom
- Education: University of Scranton
- Title: CEO of Smurfit Westrock
- Spouse: Sharon Devlin (m. 1990)
- Children: 4
- Family: Michael Smurfit (father)

Anthony Paul James Smurfit (born 1963) is an English born Irish businessman. He serves as the President and CEO of FTSE 100 packaging company Smurfit Westrock, which is named after his grandfather, John Jefferson Smurfit.

== Early life and career ==
Smurfit was born in 1963 in Wigan in Lancashire to businessman Michael Smurfit and Norma Triesman. He attended the Irish St Gerard's School and the American University of Scranton, where he earned a Bachelor of Science degree in management in 1985. Subsequently, Smurfit spent some time in Japan to study the packaging industry.

He joined Jefferson Smurfit – then led by his father – in the 1980s and was appointed director in 1989. He served in several positions in the United States and Europe including as head of Smurfit France. He became chief operations officer (COO) of the company's European division in 1999 after having been deputy for a year. Smurfit was promoted to COO of the entire company in November 2002.

In September 2015, he was appointed CEO of Smurfit Kappa following the retirement of his predecessor, Gary McGann. Besides, Smurfit is on the boards of the Confederation of European Paper Industries and Ibec, and he is a Mexican honorary consul in Ireland and a member of the European Round Table for Industry. Previously, he had also been a board member of Aer Rianta (1996–2001) and C&C Group (2012–2016).

== Personal life ==
Smurfit is married to former model and actress Sharon Devlin and has four children. One of his hobbies is horse breeding, having been a member of the Irish National Stud's board.
