= Brian Lynch (Irish writer) =

Irish writer, poet and dramatist

- Born: Brian Lynch; 1945 (age 80–81); Dublin, Ireland
- Occupations: Poet, Writer

Brian Lynch is an Irish writer of poetry, plays, fiction and other mediums.

== Life ==
Brian Lynch was born in Dublin in 1945 and continues to live there.

He worked as a journalist for the Evening Press and art critic for Hibernia Magazine. He was a press officer for the Irish governmentand the Department of Justice. During the 1970s, he was a spokesman for Attorney General of Ireland Declan Costello. He participated in the Sunningdale Conference in 1973.

He writes poetry, plays, fiction and art criticism. He established and edited The Holy Door, a literary journal, which published such writers as W.H. Auden, Anthony Cronin, Aidan Higgins and Patrick Kavanagh.

He established Duras Press, an independent literary publisher.

== Works ==
=== Poetry ===
- Endsville (with Paul Durcan) (Dublin: New Writers’ Press 1967), 59pp.;
- Beds of Down (Dublin: Raven Arts 1983), 46pp.;
- Sixty-Five Poems: Paul Celan (trans., with Peter Jankowsky) (Dublin: Raven Arts 1985), 88pp.;
- No Die Cast (New Writers’ Co-op. 1969), [12]pp. [ltd. edn. 75];
- Outside the Pheasantry (Gorey: Funge Arts Centre 1976), 16pp., ill. [by Paul Funge];
- Perpetual Star (Dublin: Raven Arts 1980), 47pp.;
- Voices from the Nettle-way (Dublin: Raven Arts 1989), 60pp.;
- Poesie a Lerici (TCD: Dept. of Italian 2003), 59pp. [chapbook of reading in Lerici, Spezia];
- New and Renewed: Poems 1967-2004 (Dublin: New Island Press 2004), 120pp.;
- Pity for the Wicked, a long poem about Northern Ireland, with a preface by Conor Cruise O’Brien (Dublin [Killiney]: Duras Press 2005), 78pp.

=== Fiction ===
- The Winner of Sorrow (Dublin: New Island Press 2005; American edition Dalkey Archive Press 2006), 300pp.
- The Woman Not the Name (Dublin: Duras Press 2013), 342pp.

=== Plays, TV and Film ===
- Crooked in the Car Seat (Dublin Theatre Festival 1979, published by the Duras Press, 2024, with a preface by Colm Tóibín and an introduction by the author);
- Days Lost Behind the Curtain (1985);
- Caught in a Free State (1983) [four part television series about German spies in Ireland, co-production between RTE and Channel 4, which won a Banff Television Festival Award for best screenplay in 1985];
- Love and Rage (1999), feature film directed by Cathal Black, starring Greta Scacchi and Daniel Craig.

== Awards ==
- Member of Aosdána nominated by Samuel Beckett and Michael Hartnett, elected 1985
- 1979: Crooked in the Car Seat nominated in the Best Play category of the Harvey's Theatre Awards
- 2005: The Winner of Sorrow shortlisted for the Hughes & Hughes Irish Book Awards.

== See also ==
- List of Irish writers
