= List of traditional musicians from County Clare =

List of traditional musicians from County Clare is an overview of notable musicians active in traditional Irish music who are considered Claremen or Clarewomen, either by birth or longtime association.

== Banjo ==
- Pecker Dunne (also singing, fiddle, melodeon and guitar)
- Jimmy Ward

== Concertina ==
- Elizabeth Crotty
- Kitty Hayes
- Noel Hill
- Gearóid Ó hAllmhuráin
- Packie Russell
- Christopher Droney

== Fiddle ==
- Paddy Canny
- Junior Crehan
- Dan Furey (also dance teacher)
- Nell Galvin (also concertina)
- Martin Hayes
- Patrick Kelly

== Flute and whistle ==
- Peadar O'Loughlin (also uilleann pipes and fiddle)
- Gussie Russell
- Micho Russell

== Uilleann pipes ==
- Gearóid de Barra
- Willie Clancy

== Singer ==
- Tom Lenihan
- Nonie Lynch

== Céilí band ==
- Laichtín Naofa Céilí Band
- Kilfenora Céilí Band
- The Tulla Céilí Band

== See also ==
- Tom Munnelly - folklorist and promoter
- Muiris Ó Rócháin - director Willie Clancy Summer School and folklorist
- The Clare Festival of Traditional Singing
