= List of Irish Travellers =

This is a list of Irish Travellers in the arts, politics and sport.

== Politicians and activists ==
- Laura Angela Collins, author of The Tinker Menace; The diary of an Irish Traveller, human rights activist, chairwomen to Justice 4 all women and children, attendee of the BRIT School
- Mary Teresa Collins (born 1960s), Traveller human rights activist, a public survivor of the Irish state and church institutions and mother to the author Laura Angela Collins
- Eileen Flynn (born 1990), Senator and first female Irish Traveller to serve in the Oireachtas
- Nan Joyce (1940–2018), pioneering Irish Travellers' rights activist
- Sindy Joyce, the first Irish Traveller to obtain a doctorate from an Irish university, human rights activist, Member of the Council of State

== Musicians ==
- Margaret Barry (1917–1989), singer
- Felix Doran (died 1972), one of the most influential uilleann pipers in the history of Irish music, active during the first half of the 20th century
- Johnny Doran (1908–1950), Irish Uilleann piper, brother of Felix Doran
- Pecker Dunne (1933–2012), singer from County Wexford, Ireland.
- Finbar Furey (born 1946), Irish folk musician. He is best known for songs such as "Campfire in the Dark" and "Sweet Sixteen".
- Paddy Keenan (born 1950), piper, founding member of the Bothy Band in the 1970s and a key figure in the transition of Irish traditional music into the world of Celtic-dominated music
- John Reilly (1926–1969), traditional Irish singer and source of songs
- Mike Ward (born 1990), English singer and runner up/finalist from The Voice UK. He has Irish Traveller roots on his father's side and is also distant cousins with Shayne Ward.
- Shayne Ward (born 1984), English singer and former winner of X Factor, whose parents are Irish Travellers who settled in England

== Athletes ==
- Francie Barrett (born 1972) represented Ireland at the Summer Olympics in Atlanta, Georgia in 1996.
- Hughie Fury (born 1994), professional boxer from Greater Manchester who won the British heavyweight title
- Tyson Fury (born 1988), professional boxer based in Morecambe, England and WBC heavyweight champion
- Michael Gomez (born 1977), professional boxer based in Manchester, England, was born to an Irish Traveller family in County Longford
- Bartley Gorman (1944–2002), self declared "king" of the gypsies and undefeated bareknuckle boxing champion
- Nathan Gorman (born 1996), professional boxer from Cheshire who fought for the British Heavyweight title
- Andy Lee (born 1984), former WBO Middleweight world champion
- John Joe Nevin (born 1988), boxer, Irish International, two-time Olympian, and a London 2012 silver medalist
- John O'Donnell (born 1985), boxer
- Patsy Joyce (born 2005/2006), boxer

== Cinema, television, theatre ==
- Michael Collins, actor (King of the Travellers)
- Sean Connery (1930–2020), Scottish actor. He was the first actor to portray fictional British secret agent James in seven Bond films. Research revealed his paternal great-grandparents were Irish Travellers from County Wexford, Ireland.
- John Connors (born 1990), actor (Love/Hate), screen writer, documentary film-maker and human rights activist
- Patrick "Paddy" Doherty (born 1959), former bare-knuckle boxer. He is best known as one of the interviewed Irish Travelers in My Big Fat Gypsy Wedding and the winner of Celebrity Big Brother 2011.
- Hughie Maughan, runner-up of Big Brother 17, contestant on the Irish Dancing with the Stars he also partook in First Dates Ireland
- Rosaleen McDonagh, playwright
