= Irish folk music (1900–1949) =

== Births and deaths ==
=== Births ===
- John Doherty (1900–1980)
- Johnny Doran (1907–1950)
- Seamus Ennis (1919–1982)
- Felix Doran (c. 1915–1972)
- Margaret Barry (1917– c. 1989 or 1990)
- Willie Clancy (1918–1973)
- Joe Heaney (1919–1984)
- Joe Cooley (1924–1973)
- Andy Irvine (1942)
- Christy Moore (1945)
- Van Morrison (1945)
- Matt Molloy (1947)
- John O'Conor (1947)
- Davy Spillane (1948)
- Gilbert O'Sullivan (1946)

=== Deaths ===
- John J Kimmel (1866–1942)
- Michael Coleman (1891–1945)

== Collections of songs or music ==
- 1907 "The Dance Music Of Ireland" by Francis O'Neill (1848–1936)
- 1909 Old Irish Folk Music by Patrick Weston Joyce (1827–1949

== Recordings ==
- 1907–1929 "Early Recordings of Irish Traditional Music" by John J Kimmel
- 1936 Michael Coleman's final recordings
- 1937–1939 "Classic Recordings of Irish Traditional Music" by Hugh Gillespie
- 1920s–1944 "Classics of Irish Piping" by Leo Rowsome (1907–1970)
- 1947 "The Bunch of Keys" by Johnny Doran (1907–1950)

== See also ==
- List of Irish music collectors
