= Laichtín Naofa Céilí Band =

The Laichtín Naofa Céilí Band is a former céilí band based in Milltown Malbay, County Clare, Ireland.

== History ==
In 1951, the Comhaltas Ceoltóirí Éireann was founded. This organisation established many local branches, including one in Milltown Malbay. Soon after its foundation, it formed the Laichtín Naofa Céilí Band. The band existed from 1954 to 1962.

It served both the parishes of Kilfarboy (Milltown Malbay) and Kilmurry Ibrickane (Quilty, Mullagh, Coore). It took its name from St. Laichtín, to whom a Holy well is dedicated on the border of both parishes.

The band took part in several competitions, including the 1955 Fleadh Cheoil in Loughrea (3rd place), 1956 1958 Munster Championship in Longford (winner) 1959 Oireachtas na Gaeilge (winner).

The band was the successor of the Milford House Céilí Band (1937-1940s).

== Members ==
Incomplete overview of musicians once playing with the band.

Fiddlers

- Paddy Galvin
- Junior Crehan
- James Flynn
- Christy Dixon

Accordions

- Paddy Joe McMahon
- Michael Sexton Sr.

Uilleann Pipes

- Willie Clancy
- Martin Talty

Flutes

- J C Talty
- Josie Hayes
- Michael Falsey

Banjo

- Jimmy Ward

Double Bass

- Angela Merry

Piano

- Colm O'Connor

Drums

- Martin Malone
- Paddy Malone
- Aidan Vaughan

== Importance ==
After the Public Dance Halls Act 1936, that outlawed the traditional country house dances, most musicians suddenly had no place to gather and play. The band was a community-based band in a rural tradition.

Junior Crehan described is importance as:

The Laichtín Naofa bridged the gap between the past and present by linking the musicians of today with the musicians of another era. In this way, it contributed to the preservation of traditional music and carried the influences of great music-masters to the new generation.

== Recordings ==
LP

- Come to an Irish Dance Party, 1959

CD's

- Come to an Irish Dance Party, 2008. A re-issue of the historic recording of 1959 digitally re-mastered.

== See also ==
- The Kilfenora Céilí Band
- The Tulla Céilí Band
