= Seán Reid =

Irish musician (1907–1978)

Seán Reid (1907–1978) was an Irish musician known as a player of the uilleann pipes, for promoting the County Clare style of piping, and for being the leader of the Tulla Céilí Band in the late 1940s.

== Biography ==
He was born in Castlefin, County Donegal. Growing up in County Tyrone he learned to play the fiddle. While studying engineering he heard the playing of piper R. L. O'Mealy from Belfast at an athletics meeting (in which he was a member of the Q.U.B. in the mile event) in County Antrim, and he decided to take up that instrument. After moving to Dublin in the early 1930s he became involved with the Gaelic League. Together with Seamus Mac Mathuna and pipers Breandán Breathnach and Tommy Reck he set about reviving the Piper's club, which had not functioned for a number of years. Studying with John Potts (grandfather of Seán Potts), one of Ireland's greatest pipers at the time, he came into contact with other famous pipers such as Leo Rowsome and Johnny Doran.

In 1936 Seán Reid moved to County Clare where he worked as County Surveyor (civil engineer) in charge of sewage and drainage.

Working for Clare County Council he made the acquaintance of Crusheen man, fiddle player Mick Malone and Inagh man, Joe Leyden. Joe was the County Council clerk of works for the county and through him Seán Reid got to know every active traditional musician in the county. Through the travelling piper, Johnny Doran, he got to know of pipers Willie Clancy and Martin Talty. He promoted the revival of piping in Clare, bringing a group of Clare pipers to compete in the Oireachtas gathering annually in the 1940s and 1950s.

In the late 1940s he played in the Tulla Céilí Band with Joe Cooley, before Cooley went to the United States. From 1950 until the formation of the Pipers Club he worked to promote the Comhaltas Ceoltóirí Éireann (CCE) in county Clare and Munster. After many years of waiting for CCE to devote a greater effort to reviving the uilleann pipes he, and a small group of like minded pipers decided that it was "now or never" and so proceeded, much to the annoyance of CCE, to formally set up the Pipers Club in Dublin, an organisation that would foster and promote the uilleann pipes to ensure it would survive.

In 1998 the Sean Reid society was founded to promote uilleann pipe scholarship.
