= Irish folk music (1970–1979) =

== Births and deaths ==
=== Deaths ===
- Felix Doran (c. 1915–1972)
- Willie Clancy (1918–1973)
- Joe Cooley (1924–1973)

== Recordings ==
- 1970 "Moondance" (Van Morrison)
- 1971 "Prosperous" (Christy Moore)
- 1972 Alone Again (Naturally) (Gilbert O'Sullivan) (US No. 1)
- 1972 Clair (Gilbert O'Sullivan) (UK No. 1)
- 1972 "Get Down" (Gilbert O'Sullivan) (UK No. 1)
- 1972 "Happy to Meet, Sorry To Part" (Horslips)
- 1972 "Planxty" (Planxty)
- 1973 "The Tain" (Horslips)
- 1973 "Well Below The Valley" (Planxty)
- 1974 "Dancehall Sweethearts" (Horslips)
- 1975 "Carolan's Receipt" (Derek Bell)
- 1975 "Drive the Cold Winter Away" (Horslips)
- 1975 "De Dannan" (De Dannan)
- 1976 "The Book of Invasions" (Horslips)
- 1977 "7" (Chieftains)
- 1978 "8" (Chieftains)
- 1979 "Broken Hearted I'll Wander" (Dolores Keane & John Faulkner)
