= Willie Clancy Summer School =

Annual traditional music and dance school in Ireland

Willie Clancy Summer School Scoil Samhraidh Willie Clancy
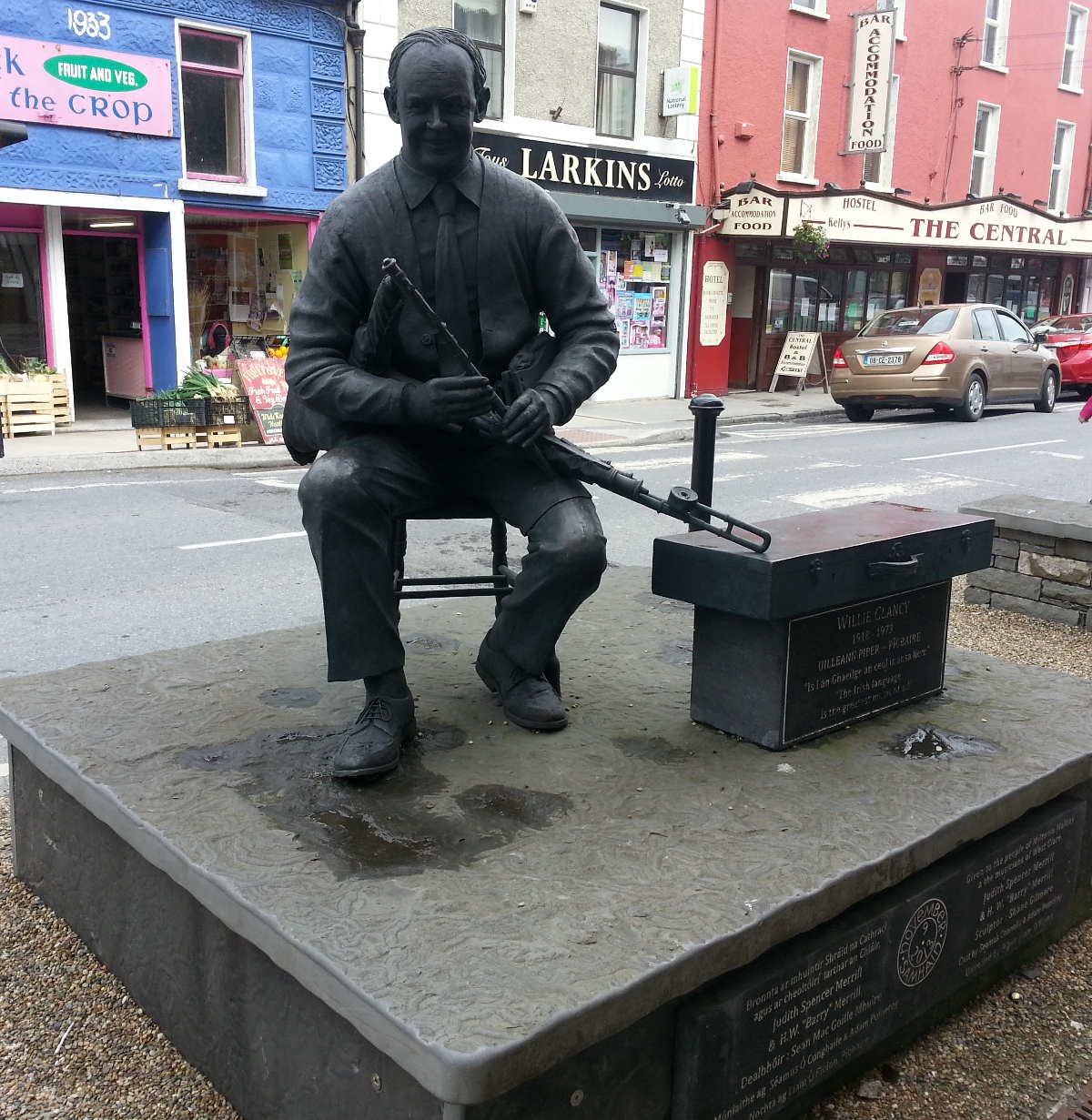
- Willie Clancy statue in Milltown Malbay
- Status: Active
- Genre: Irish traditional music and dance
- Date: July
- Begins: First Saturday
- Frequency: Annually
- Venue: Schools, hotels, homes
- Locations: Milltown Malbay, County Clare
- Coordinates: 52.855°N 9.400°W
- Country: Ireland
- Years active: 1973—present
- Founders: Junior Crehan; Séamus MacMathúna; Paddy Joe McMahon; Muiris Ó Rócháin; Martin Talty
- Participants: 1,000
- Attendance: Thousands
- Major events: Classes in instruments and dancing, céilis, lectures, recitals, workshops
- Website: scoilsamhraidhwillieclancy.com

The Willie Clancy Summer School (Irish: Scoil Samhraidh Willie Clancy) in Ireland is the world's largest traditional music summer school, held annually since 1973 in memory of the uilleann piper Willie Clancy. During the week, nearly a thousand students from all over the world attend daily classes taught by experts in Irish music and dance. In addition, a full programme of lectures, recitals, céilí dances, and exhibitions are run by the school.

School events are held in the town of Milltown Malbay in County Clare on the west coast of Ireland, during the week beginning on the first Saturday of July. The weekly registration includes six classes, all lectures and recitals (except the Saturday concert), and reduced price admission to céilís. Lectures, recitals, the concert, and céilís are open to the public.

The summer school won the MÓRglór Award (named in memory of Muiris Ó Rócháin) in 2025.

== The school ==
Clancy discussed the idea of a summer school with his friends in 1972, months before he died. The event was founded by a committee of local people after the death of Clancy, aged 54, in January 1973. After the death of Clancy, Muiris Ó Rócháin built on this idea with Séamus Mac Mathúna, Martin Talty, Junior Crehan and Paddy Joe McMahon. They were soon joined by others like Sean Reid, Jimmy Ward and Peadar O'Loughlin.

== See also ==
- Queen Maeve International Summer School
