= Garret Barry (piper) =

Blind Irish uilleann piper (1847–1899)

The final illustration in Francis O’Neill's Irish Minstrels and Musicians (1913) shows a likely depiction of Garrett Barry, ‘the blind piper of Inagh’, processed from an original photograph.

Garret(t) Barry (Irish: Gearóid de Barra; 27 March 1847 – 6 April 1899) was a blind Irish uilleann piper from Inagh, County Clare, among the most famous players of the 19th century.

Barry was born in 1847, during the Great Famine, and disease caused him to lose his sight as a young child. A common form of charity for the disabled, Barry was taught the uilleann pipes, giving him a livelihood and a place within the community. As a bearer of the piping tradition Barry was a popular and respected musician travelling his region to play at house dances.

He inspired many later pipers such as Willie Clancy (whose father knew Barry). He is credited with many tunes that are still in the repertoire of players of Irish traditional music such as ‘Garrett Barry's jig', ‘The Humours of Gl(e)in', and ‘I buried my wife and danced on top of her'.

== Early life ==
Born in rural Ireland at the height of the Great Starvation, virtually all the information we have of the life of Garrett Barry comes through oral tradition. No official records of him exist other than certification of his death as a 52-year-old bachelor, on 6 April 1899. However, the impression he made on his community of west County Clare was great enough to have created abiding memories of his life as a mendicant musician. According to his relatives, he was raised on a farm in the townland of Kylea, Inagh parish, on the shores of Cloonmackan Lough, in an area known as Garraí na Saileog or the Garden of Willows. One tune, closely associated with Barry, carries this same name.

Barry lost his sight in infancy, contracting one of the diseases that were prevalent at that time, probably either chickenpox or smallpox. However, local wisdom claims that he developed exceptional hearing and was also possessed of a remarkable memory along with his other talents. A strong local culture had survived the Famine in the Inagh district, much still based on the Irish language. The region had largely retained its poetry, song, music and dance. Like most blind children at that time, Garrett Barry was obliged to learn poetic or musical skills in order to earn a living. His reputation as a singer and as a precocious performer on the Irish bagpipes soon began to grow.

In Garrett's adolescent years, a poet and teacher named Seamus Mac Cruitín (James MacCurtin) ran a hedge school close to the Barry farmstead. MacCurtin claimed to be the last in a long line of hereditary bardic poets and also taught local children a wide range of subjects in what must have been very informal circumstances. Tradition has it that Garrett Barry, on occasion, played for this albeit rudimentary but earnest establishment and must have acquired much of MacCurtin's enthusiasm for cultural subjects. Like MacCurtin, it's quite possible that Garrett Barry had travelled in County Kerry in his younger years. An old neighbour of the Barry family claimed that he had received some tutoring from a Kerry piper and some of the repertoire and style of that region are thought to have been prevalent in his music.

== Career ==
The last third of the nineteenth century saw the rise of small scale but independent farmers, who had established themselves enough to permit some leisure pastimes. In his early career as a travelling musician, despite his blindness and the lack of infrastructure, Barry seems to have exhibited a remarkable ability to avail himself to many hosting families over a large part of west Clare. The rise in popularity of house-dancing meant that someone with Barry's talents was in great demand as a singer, storyteller and genealogist as well as a piper. His services would have been especially important at events as diverse as wedding celebrations and also at what were known as ‘American wakes’. These were bitter-sweet events held the night before someone in the community was due to emigrate – a harsh and continuing reality long before and after, as well as during, the Great Famine. Inevitably, his reputation was such that some families would compete for the privilege of hosting Barry for long periods and would arrange his transportation whenever he required to move on. Local tradition also claims him to have been a pre-eminent fiddle-player and, as such, he would have shared music socially and privately with other local players.

Several musical west Clare families, predominantly in the Miltown Malbay area, were alleged to have had regular contact with Garrett Barry. Most notably these included the Bourkes in Miltown itself, the Carrolls in Freagh, the Crehans around Carrowduff, the Lenihans of Knockbrack and the Clancys of Illaunbaun. The latter, like James MacCurtin, also claimed some bardic ancestry and Garrett had a strong influence on Gilbert Clancy who was a generation younger. Other musicians, who had known Barry in their youth and acknowledged his legacy into the twentieth century were Thady Casey from Annagh, Hugh Curtin in Cloghaun Beg and Nell Galvin (née McCarthy) of Moyasta. Later, as a flute-player and singer, Gilbert Clancy was to tutor his son, Willie, in the finer points of Garrett's music. Though born almost twenty years after the piper's death, Willie Clancy is widely believed to have exhibited much of Barry's style and repertoire through his father's insistent teaching.

While sufficient Irish music had survived the Great Famine, in its aftermath, new Continental dance forms and fashions found their way into rural communities through the activities of peripatetic teachers known as ‘dancing masters’. The established jigs, reels and hornpipes were being partially displaced by the polka, waltz, mazurka, and schottische. A formation dance, the quadrille, became the forerunner of the modern Irish set dance. Barry, as a professional musician, would be expected to provide accompaniment for all of these dances and more but his reported saying was: ‘my music is not for the feet but for the soul’. His interpretation of slow airs or laments, also of some jigs as improvised ‘pieces’, offered a contrasting vein of musical expression, no doubt informed by his knowledge of and ability to perform Irish songs as sean-nós. This is the ancient ornate and free-form style often used when singing in Gaelic.

Garrett Barry, not surprisingly, was strongly radical in his politics. Along with his other talents, ‘his music was his nationalism’. Local tradition has it that he was introduced to and played for the most influential politician of his day, Charles Stewart Parnell. Huge crowds would attend Parnell's rallies during his campaigning visits to County Clare as elsewhere. As leader of the Irish National Land League, Parnell campaigned for the rights and fair rents of tenant farmers. Later his Irish Parliamentary Party also temporarily united those, who advocated full Irish republicanism, with the Irish Home Rule movement, whose members favoured self-government within Great Britain as their aim.

== Final years ==
Eventually, the life-style of an itinerant musician took its toll. Towards the end of 1896, Garrett Barry was admitted into the Ennistymon Infirmary, which was then part of the Poor Law Union workhouse. As was common at that time, he had been a clay pipe smoker and also chewed tobacco. Diagnosed with a mouth cancer, he remained there until his death almost three years later. Gilbert Clancy, who had emigrated to America in 1890, returned just prior to Garrett Barry's death, nine years later. Stories claim that Gilbert made his old friend a coffin and brought his body back to Inagh cemetery for burial, though the precise location of his grave was unidentified and is still locally disputed.

Sadly, Garrett Barry was never recorded though the earliest wax phonograph cylinders of piping in Ireland were made during the last two years of his life. These were competition recordings arranged by Conradh na Gaeilge or the Gaelic League during some of their early Feis Ceoil events. Other blind pipers, such as Denis Delaney from near Ballinasloe, County Galway, and Michael ‘Cumbaw’ O’Sullivan from County Kerry, were among the first to be recorded at these functions. These recordings are accessible through the archive of Na Píobairí Uilleann.

== Legacy ==
The fact that memories of Garret Barry had persisted with some natives of his home region implies that he had a profound effect on his local culture. In the late 1950s, the broadcaster Ciarán Mac Mathúna collected a considerable number of stories relating to Barry. One was a tale involving an encounter with a fairy changeling in which Garrett Barry is specifically cast as a protagonist. Similar stories have been recorded in the area since. The implication must be that Garrett had become a very familiar and popular figure in his community and had entered the collective unconscious of local people. The involvement of a real-life, historical figure in folklore is always a sign of their full recognition and significance in the culture.

Garret Barry was the last native itinerant piper in County Clare. His main cultural contribution remains in that he carried post-Famine piping here to the threshold of twentieth century. Even Willie Clancy, a native of Miltown Malbay, who had learned much of Barry's music from his father Gilbert as a flute player, had grown up never actually having heard the Irish pipes. In 1936, the arrival of Johnny Doran, a traveller from County Wicklow, revived such interest in the pipes that Clancy and his friend Martin Talty were both moved to take up the instrument. When Clancy died in 1973, the Willie Clancy Summer School was established to foster this growing, now international, enthusiasm for the Irish uilleann pipes.

Today, a few dance tunes are still named after ‘the blind piper of Inagh’, notably Garrett Barry's Jig, Garrett Barry's Reel and Garrett Barry's Mazurka. Though they bear his name, it is uncertain whether Barry actually composed these or not. The Jig and Reel, especially, have other close melodic relatives. However, in sharing this title, these tunes must have been strongly associated with his music and, immersed as Barry was within the aural tradition, they demonstrate his individual power of reinvention.

Despite his alleged talent and influence, Garret Barry is surprisingly absent from Francis O’Neill's unique and comprehensive book, Irish Musicians and Minstrels (1913). Many pipers, from the eighteenth through to the early twentieth centuries, are included in this seminal collection. Between 1873 and 1905, O’Neill worked in the Chicago City Police Force and had access to numerous Irish immigrants who supplied him with considerable amounts of information concerning their native music. (Much of the resurgence of Irish traditional music in the twentieth century drew on O’Neill's subsequent tune anthologies.) Perhaps Garrett Barry's general involvement with private functions, lodging with those families who had more of a permanent stake in the land, meant that fewer people encountered him inside the relatively isolated community of west Clare. Nevertheless, during the last half of the nineteenth century, over the course of Barry's life, the population of County Clare had fallen by almost half through emigration. Many of these people would have gone to the United States. Ironically, however, the final image in O’Neill's book depicts an unidentified piper that fits all the contemporary descriptions of Garrett Barry. This picture, titled here as ‘Lay of the Last Minstrel’, is derived from a postcard that was almost certainly manufactured from an original plate photograph, a process that was very typical at that time.

== See also ==
- Cormac de Barra
- Martin O'Reilly, died 1904
- Tarlach Mac Suibhne, fl. 1893
- Donell Dubh Ó Cathail, harper to Elizabeth I, c. 1560s – c.1660
