= Peadar O'Loughlin =

Irish musician (1929–2017)

Peadar O'Loughlin ([ˈpʲad̪ˠəɾˠ]; 6 November 1929 – 22 October 2017) was an Irish fluter, fiddler, and piper from Kilmaley County Clare, Ireland who had been a fixture in Irish music since the late 1940s. He was best known for having played on the highly influential 1959 LP "All-Ireland Champions - Violin" (with Paddy Canny, P. Joe Hayes, and Bridie Lafferty), which was one of the first LPs of Irish traditional music. He performed in the Tulla Céilí Band and Kilfenora Céilí Band and recorded duet albums with piper Ronan Browne and fiddler Maeve Donnelly.

His unique flute style earned him All-Ireland champion titles in 1956 and 1957. It is characterized by strong rhythmic flow with sparse ornamentation, occasionally punctuated by unusually long silences which emphasize the rhythmic structure of the tunes. In 2005 he received the TG4 Gradam Saoil (lifetime achievement award).

== Discography ==
- All-Ireland Champions - Violin, 1959
- The South West Wind (with Ronan Browne), 1988
- Touch Me If You Dare (with Ronan Browne), 2002
- The Thing Itself (with Maeve Donnelly), 2004
- The Legacy (with Ronan Browne), 2015
- Peter O'Loughlin, A Musical Life, 2016
- Friends of Note (with Paddy Canny, Paddy Murphy & Geraldine Cotter), 2019
