= Laura Collins =

Laura Collins may refer to:

- Laura Angela Collins, Irish Traveller activist and author
- Laura Sedgwick Collins, American musician, composer and actress
