= John Rea (musician) =

Irish musician

John Rea was a hammered dulcimer player from Glenarm in County Antrim, Northern Ireland.

Born in 1915 (some sources say 1922), John was the youngest of ten children. His six older brothers were all taught to play the fiddle by his father. However, as he was too small, his father had a dulcimer made by John's brother Alexander (a carpenter), using a borrowed dulcimer as a pattern, and that became John's instrument. This instrument was in turn used as the pattern for many other instruments made for other local people. In contrast to the wooden hammers generally employed by today's players, John used hammers made of thick steel wire, wound with wool; he made these himself from old bicycle spokes. His repertoire consisted mostly of traditional Irish tunes, though with a significant Scottish influence (he also played a number of strathspeys, which he referred to as "highlands"). His father taught him a number of jigs by the 18th-century composer Walker "Piper" Jackson (from the townland of Lisdaun, parish of Ballingarry, Aughrim, County Limerick). Rea appeared on stage with the well-known group, The Chieftains. John Rea died on 15 November 1983.

== Discography ==
- John Rea & Sean McAloon, Drops Of Brandy, Topic 12TS287, 1976
- John Rea, Traditional Music On The Hammer Dulcimer, Topic 12TS373, 1979
- John Rea, The Irish Hammered Dulcimer, Ossian OSS83, 1993 (cassette reissue of Topic 12TS373)
- Various artists, Irish Traditional Music, Temple COMD2079, 2000 (compilation culled from three Topic releases, including 12TS287 and 12TS373)

In 2009 The Belfast Hornpipe/The Rights Of Man from Traditional Music On the Hammer Dulcimer was included in Topic Records 70 year anniversary boxed set Three Score and Ten as track twenty three on the third CD.
