= Kevin Keegan (musician) =

Irish musician

- Born: 1924; Ballinasloe, County Galway, Ireland
- Died: 20 December 1978 (aged 53–54); San Francisco, California
- Genres: Traditional Irish
- Instrument: Accordion
- Years active: 1940s–1978

Kevin Keegan (1924–20 December 1978) was an Irish musician known for his traditional accordion music.

== Biography ==
Keegan was born in Ballinasloe, County Galway in 1924. He toured the United States with The Aughrim Slopes Céilí Band in 1956 and stayed in the country, moving to Chicago that year. He later moved to San Francisco, California in 1970 where, along with his long-time friend and fellow accordion player Joe Cooley, he proved influential among American musicians studying traditional Irish music. While living in California, he played with mandolinist Kenny Hall at his Sweets Mill Music Camp in Fresno. He died in San Francisco in 1978 and was buried in County Galway. The Cooley-Keegan Branch of Comhaltas Ceoltóirí Éireann in San Francisco is named in honor of Keegan and Joe Cooley
