= The Forgotten Maggies =

- Directed by: Steven O'Riordan
- Produced by: Steven O'Riordan
- Starring: Mary Teresa Collins; Maureen O'Sullivan; Kathleen Legg; Mary King
- Release date: October 2009
- Running time: 51 minutes
- Country: Ireland
- Language: English

The Forgotten Maggies (2009) is a documentary made by Irish film maker Steven O'Riordan about the Magdalene laundries. It was launched at the Galway Film Fleadh 2009. It was screened on the Irish television station TG4 in 2011, attracting over 360,000 viewers. The women who appeared in the documentary, including Mary Teresa Collins, Mary King, Kathleen Legg and Maureen O'Sullivan, were among the first Magdalene women to meet with Irish government officials. These women brought national and international attention to the subject.
