= Nell Galvin =

Irish fiddle and concertina player (1887–1961)

- Born: Ellen McCarthy; 1887
- Origin: County Clare, Ireland
- Died: 1961 (aged 73–74)
- Genres: Traditional Irish
- Instruments: fiddle and concertina
- Years active: 1901-1961

Ellen (Nell) Galvin (1887 - 5 September 1961) was a fiddle and concertina player from County Clare, Ireland. She was originally from Ballydineen, Knockalough, near Kilmihil.

Nell Galvin learned to play when she was young. She was taught by Garret Barry, a blind uilleann pipes player from Inagh. Because Galvin could not decide what was her favourite instrument, he taught her to play on both the fiddle and the concertina.

In 1901, she entered the Thomond Feis in Ennis and won the fiddle competition. In 1905 Galvin took part again, this time playing the concertina and the fiddle. She won both competitions. She later won a competition in Kilkee, where she was judged by Seamus Clandillon, who would become director of Radio Éireann.

In 1937, Nell Galvin was granted an audition for Radio Éireann in Dublin. This made it possible to broadcast traditional music over 2RN a number of times.

Galvin used the effect of droning strings, dissonance and intricate ornamentation in her playing style.

In the mid-1950s, some recordings were made of her music. These recordings are now part of the RTÉ-collection at the ITMA in Dublin. The importance of Nell Galvin's music is mainly found in history and continuity. She forms a link between the pre-Famine musicians and mentors on one side and the modern day musicians on the other side of the timescale.

Galvin played with many Clare traditional musicians, including Mrs. Crotty (concertina), John Kelly (fiddle), Sean Reid, Dr. Bill Loughnane and Willie Clancy (uilleann pipes).

Later she played with her son Stephen as guests with the Kilfenora Céilí Band. They played an unnamed reel, that promptly was baptized "Mrs Galvin's" by the Band.

Nell Galvin is the namesake of the Nell Galvin Traditional Music Weekend in Moyasta. This festival later amalgamated to form the "Crotty Galvin Traditional Weekend".

== Personal life ==
Nell Galvin, born as Ellen McCarthy, married Moyasta-man Patrick Galvin. They had two girls and three boys.

== See also ==
- Mrs. Crotty
