= Lough Gill Quartet =

Irish traditional music quartet

Lough Gill Quartette
- Origin: Dublin, Ireland
- Genres: Traditional Irish music
- Years active: 1930s, 1940s
- Labels: His Master's Voice, EMI, RTÉ, Topic Records
- Members: Sonny Brogan; Bill Harte; Sarah Hobbs; James Cawley

The Lough Gill Quartette was an Irish traditional music quartet formed in Dublin, Ireland in the 1930s. The quartet was named after the famous Sligo lake and as a tribute to Michael Coleman who came from Sligo. The unusual spelling of 'Quartette' can be seen on the original 78 rpm records.

The band featured Sonny Brogan and Bill Harte on accordion, Sarah Hobbs on fiddle and James Cawley on flute.

== Discography ==
The Lough Gill Quartette recorded four 78 rpm records for His Master's Voice in February 1941.

His Master's Voice IM946
(A) Jigs : Newport Lass, Leitrim Jig (Matrix No His Master's Voice OEL.204-1)
(B) Reels : Lough Gill Favourites [The Hut in the Bog, Sporting Nell] (Matrix No His Master's Voice OEL.207-1)

His Master's Voice IM947
(A) Reels: The Hawthorn Bush, Castle Kelly (Matrix No His Master's Voice OEL.206-1)
(B) Hornpipes: The Flowers of May, The Silver Spire (Matrix No His Master's Voice OEL.205-1)

His Master's Voice IM948
(A) Jigs : Memories of Ballymote, The Kiltullagh Jig (Matrix No His Master's Voice OEL.203-1)
(B) Reels : Jenny's Wedding, Toss the Feathers (Matrix No His Master's Voice OEL.208-1)

His Master's Voice IM949
(A) Reels : Ballinure Rake, The Market Man (Matrix No His Master's Voice OEL.209-1)
(B) Jigs : The Mill Pond, Mist on the Meadow (Matrix No His Master's Voice OEL.202-1)

== Notes ==
"The Ballinure Rake" was later known as "Sonny Brogan's Favourite".
"The Flowers of May" and "The Silver Spire" from IM947 were re-released in 1986 on the RTÉ/EMI LP "The Irish Phonograph Vol I" (GAE1003).
"The Mill Pond" and "The Mist on the Meadow" from IM949 were re-released on the CD "Irish Dance Music" (Topic TSCD602)

== Reviews ==
The sleeve notes of the CD "Irish Dance Music" say that this music is described "as representative of the quality music played by a hard core of active traditional musicians in Dublin at the time. Bill Harte and Sonny are reputed to have been among the pioneers who saw the potential for Irish music making in the button accordion pitched B/C and subsequently devised and disseminated the fingering method".
