= Paddy O'Brien (accordionist) =

Irish button accordion player and composer

Paddy O'Brien (10 February 1922 – 2 March 1991) was an Irish button accordion player and composer. He was instrumental in establishing the B/C style of button accordion playing in Irish traditional music.

== Musician ==
O'Brien was born in Newtown, near Nenagh, County Tipperary; he is the son of traditional fiddler and accordionist Dinny O'Brien, who was the leader of the Bridge Céilí Band.

While still a teenager he played with the Lough Derg Céilí Band and with the Aughrim Slopes Céilí Band. In 1949 he joined the Tulla Céilí Band, replacing the Galway accordionist Joe Cooley. He won the All-Ireland Senior Accordion Championship in 1953.

In later life he tutored céilí bands, including the Ormond and Premier céilí bands.

== Composer ==
O'Brien composed over one hundred tunes during his lifetime, including reels, double jigs, slip jigs, single jigs, hornpipes, polkas, and marches. A selection of many of his tunes was published by his daughter Eileen in 2009. The collection includes "Cooley’s Hornpipe", "Dinny O’Brien’s Reel", "The Boys of Lough Gowna" (jig), "The New House". Eileen also released a CD of his music, Aon le h'Aon, played by herself, at the Willie Clancy Summer School in 2012.

Since 1992 his memory has been commemorated at the annual Aonach Paddy O’Brien which takes place in Nenagh on the August week before the annual Fleadh na hÉireann.

== Family ==
He married Eileen Seery, whose brother, Sean Seery (piper) and father Jim Seery (fiddle player) were both founder members of Comhaltas Ceoltoiri Éireann.

O'Brien's daughter Eileen is a well-known fiddler and pianist, and a member of the Boruma Trio. Fiddler Seán Ryan was a cousin.
