= Slán leis an gCeol =

- Directed by: Cathal Ó Cuaig
- Produced by: Cathal Ó Cuaig]
- Starring: Tony MacMahon
- Cinematography: Séamus Deasy
- Edited by: Ronnie Quinlan
- Release date: 28 March 2019
- Running time: 52 minutes
- Country: Ireland
- Language: English & Irish

Slán leis an gCeol (lit. 'Farewell to Music') is a 2019 film documenting the life of Tony MacMahon, an Irish traditional musician. The film was directed and produced by Irish filmmaker Cathal Ó Cuaig.

The film premiered at the Temple Bar TradFest on the 26 January 2019 and was attended by the President of Ireland Michael D. Higgins as guest of honour. This screening was followed by a Q&A with Tony MacMahon and Cathal Ó Cuaig, hosted by Tristan Rosenstock. It also was shown at the 2019 Dingle International Film Festival on 24 March 2019. It was first broadcast on RTÉ One television on the 28 March 2019.

It won the Celtic Media Festival's Torc Award for Excellence in the Arts category in 2020. It has also won the European Prix CIRCOM Regional Programme Award in 2020 in the Music & Arts category.

The film was broadcast on Croatian Television Broadcaster HRT on 14 May 2021. On 15 June 2021, the Galician Television Channel CRTVG also broadcast the film.
