= The Ireland That We Dreamed Of =

1943 radio address by Éamon de Valera

"On Language & the Irish Nation" was the title of a radio address made by Éamon de Valera, then Taoiseach of Ireland, on Raidió Éireann on Saint Patrick's Day (17 March) 1943. It is often called The Ireland that we dreamed of, a phrase which is used within it, or the "comely maidens" speech. The speech marked the 50th anniversary of the foundation of the Gaelic League (Conradh na Gaeilge), a group promoting Irish culture and the Irish language. In the most frequently quoted passage of the speech, de Valera set out his vision of an ideal Ireland:

The ideal Ireland that we would have, the Ireland that we dreamed of, would be the home of a people who valued material wealth only as a basis for right living, of a people who, satisfied with frugal comfort, devoted their leisure to the things of the spirit – a land whose countryside would be bright with cosy homesteads, whose fields and villages would be joyous with the sounds of industry, with the romping of sturdy children, the contest of athletic youths and the laughter of happy [or comely; discussed later] maidens, whose firesides would be forums for the wisdom of serene old age. The home, in short, of a people living the life that God desires that men should live. With the tidings that make such an Ireland possible, St. Patrick came to our ancestors fifteen hundred years ago promising happiness here no less than happiness hereafter. It was the pursuit of such an Ireland that later made our country worthy to be called the island of saints and scholars. It was the idea of such an Ireland - happy, vigorous, spiritual - that fired the imagination of our poets; that made successive generations of patriotic men give their lives to win religious and political liberty; and that will urge men in our own and future generations to die, if need be, so that these liberties may be preserved. One hundred years ago, the Young Irelanders, by holding up the vision of such an Ireland before the people, inspired and moved them spiritually as our people had hardly been moved since the Golden Age of Irish civilisation. Fifty years later, the founders of the Gaelic League similarly inspired and moved the people of their day. So, later, did the leaders of the Irish Volunteers. We of this time, if we have the will and active enthusiasm, have the opportunity to inspire and move our generation in like manner. We can do so by keeping this thought of a noble future for our country constantly before our eyes, ever seeking in action to bring that future into being, and ever remembering that it is for our nation as a whole that future must be sought.

De Valera had made an annual radio speech on Saint Patrick's Day since coming to power after the 1932 election. At the time the 1943 speech was made, the Second World War was raging and the threat of German invasion (Operation Green) or British re-occupation (Plan W) was very real.

== Legacy and misquotation ==
The 1943 speech in later years has been critiqued and often derided as archetypal of de Valera's traditionalist view of an isolationist, agricultural land where women held a traditional role. The phrase most commonly cited in this regard is the misquotation "comely maidens dancing at the crossroads". The speech in fact made no mention of crossroads dances, a rural tradition then dying out. The first incidence of the "dancing at the crossroads" line being misattributed to De Valera is in 1986 in the Irish Independent ("it's all a long way from poor Dev's vision of comely maidens dancing at the crossroads") - this was the same year that Charles Lamb's painting called "Dancing at the Crossroads" was sold at auction to much media coverage, which may have contributed to the misunderstanding. There were multiple incidences of the misquote later this same year, usually in the context of how modern Ireland had changed from De Valera's vision. Jiving at the Crossroads, a book about modern Ireland by then Hot Press journalist John Waters was published in 1991, reinforcing the line as an avatar of traditional, Catholic Ireland.

Although the phrase was "comely maidens" in the prepared text sent in advance to the newspapers, printed in the following day's Irish Press, and reprinted in Maurice Moynihan's 1980 anthology, it was "happy maidens" in the 78 rpm disc recorded by His Master's Voice and sent to the United States for later broadcast. It is unclear which wording was used during the live Radio Éireann broadcast, or whether the His Master's Voice recording was made then or later. A double LP record of de Valera's speeches from the RTÉ archives, released in 1982 on the centenary of his birth, brought the "happy maidens" variant wording back to public notice.

In 2007, J. J. Lee and Diarmaid Ferriter argued for a reappraisal of the speech in the light of the Celtic Tiger consumption bubble and the Moriarty Tribunal revelations of corruption by 1980s Taoiseach Charles Haughey. Similarly, David McCullagh in 2018 suggests that its advocacy of "frugal comfort" was motivated by egalitarianism: "to ensure a minimum for everyone, the better off would have to accept a lower standard of living". Lee suggested de Valera's "Victorian language" gave his vision an antiquated tone that hid the continuing relevance of much of its vision. Ferriter called it "the most famous broadcast by any Irish politician of the twentieth century".

== Sources ==
Primary

- ""The Ireland That We Dreamed Of" 1943". Éamon de Valera (1882–1975). RTÉ archives. 17 March 1943.
- De Valera, Éamon (1980). "On Language & the Irish Nation". In Moynihan, Maurice (ed.). Speeches and statements by Eamon De Valera: 1917–73. Gill and Macmillan. p. 466. ISBN 9780717109180.

Secondary

- Ferriter, Diarmaid; Crowe, Catríona; Murphy, William (9 December 2007). "His 'comely maidens' vision and attitude to women, the Irish Language and attitude to sport" (MP3). Judging Dev. RTÉ Radio 1.
- Ferriter, Diarmaid (2007). Judging Dev: A Reassessment of the Life and Legacy of Eamon De Valera. Royal Irish Academy. ISBN 9781904890287.
