= Sean McAloon =

Sean McAloon (1923–1998) was a piper and pipe maker from Northern Ireland. Originally from the Rosslea area of County Fermanagh, McAloon's first instrument was the fiddle. However, he is best known as a master of the uilleann pipes. He emigrated to the United States in 1964, but after a year he returned to Ireland. He spent eight months working as a builder's labourer in Dublin, but moved to Belfast in 1966 to be closer to his family. There, he got a job working for the Corporation Parks Department.

His major inspirations as a piper were Phil Martin, whom he saw playing at a feis in Rosslea, and Leo Rowsome. In addition to being a fine player, McAloon eventually became a respected pipe repairer and a highly regarded reed-maker. He produced about twenty sets of the instrument in his lifetime. Desy McCabe from Craobh plays a McAloon half set

== Discography ==
Various artists, "Ulster's Flowery Vale", B.B.C. Radio Enterprises REC28M, no date (a compilation of traditional songs and music originally broadcast on the Northern Ireland Home Service, July and August 1968)

- John Rea & Sean McAloon, Drops of Brandy, Topic 12TS287, 1976
- Various artists, Irish Traditional Music, Temple COMD2079, 2000 (compilation culled from three Topic releases, including 12TS287)
- Sean McAloon, Stor Piobaireachta (Piping from the Archives), Na Píobairí Uilleann, 2004
