= Moyasta =

Hamlet in County Clare, Ireland

Moyasta Maigh Sheasta
- Hamlet
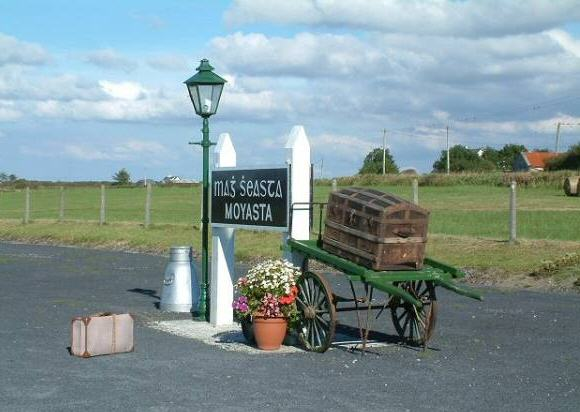

- Location in Ireland
- Coordinates: 52°40′02″N 9°32′15″W
- Country: Ireland
- Province: Munster
- County: County Clare
- Time zone: UTC+0 (WET)
  - Summer (DST): UTC-1 (IST (WEST))

Moyasta (Irish: Maigh Sheasta, meaning 'plain of Asta') is a hamlet in County Clare, Ireland, situated between Kilkee and Kilrush on the N67. The hamlet is bordered by the Moyasta River, flowing from the bogs to Poulnasherry Bay.

== History ==
Moyasta was part of the Vandeleur Estate. In the post-famine era, the name Vandeleur became synonymous with the worst of landlord evictions, with over 20,000 evicted from the part of their estate in the Kilrush Union.

On 13 March 1921 a Moyasta farmer and Sinn Féin magistrate named Tom Shannon was murdered in his home by unknown assailants. According to the Irish Times on 7 April 1921, which based its article on a report from British government, the killing was done by other Sinn Féin supporters. The government report claimed that Shannon, a magistrate in the Sinn Féin courts, was trying to distance himself from the courts and had refused to pay local Sinn Féin taxes. In fact, it was clear that the assailants spoke with a strange accent, something the English Court Of Inquiry was not told by the Royal Irish Constabulary. Due to the lack of information, the Court could only conclude that the murder was committed by "persons unknown". This gave the government the opportunity to use the event for some anti-Irish propaganda. According to more recent research, the murder of Tom Shannon was part of a "secret murder campaign". This campaign was directed at prominent people, often elected representatives and magistrates. As a magistrate, Shannon fell victim of this campaign.

== Railway ==
Moyasta Junction railway station is the junction of the Kilkee and Kilrush branches of the West Clare Railway, from which point a single line continues to Ennis and Milltown Malbay. The station forms a museum, and is also the headquarters of the narrow-gauge West Clare Railway in its restored format as a seasonal heritage railway.

== Notable people ==
- Nell Galvin, fiddle and concertina player

== Gallery ==
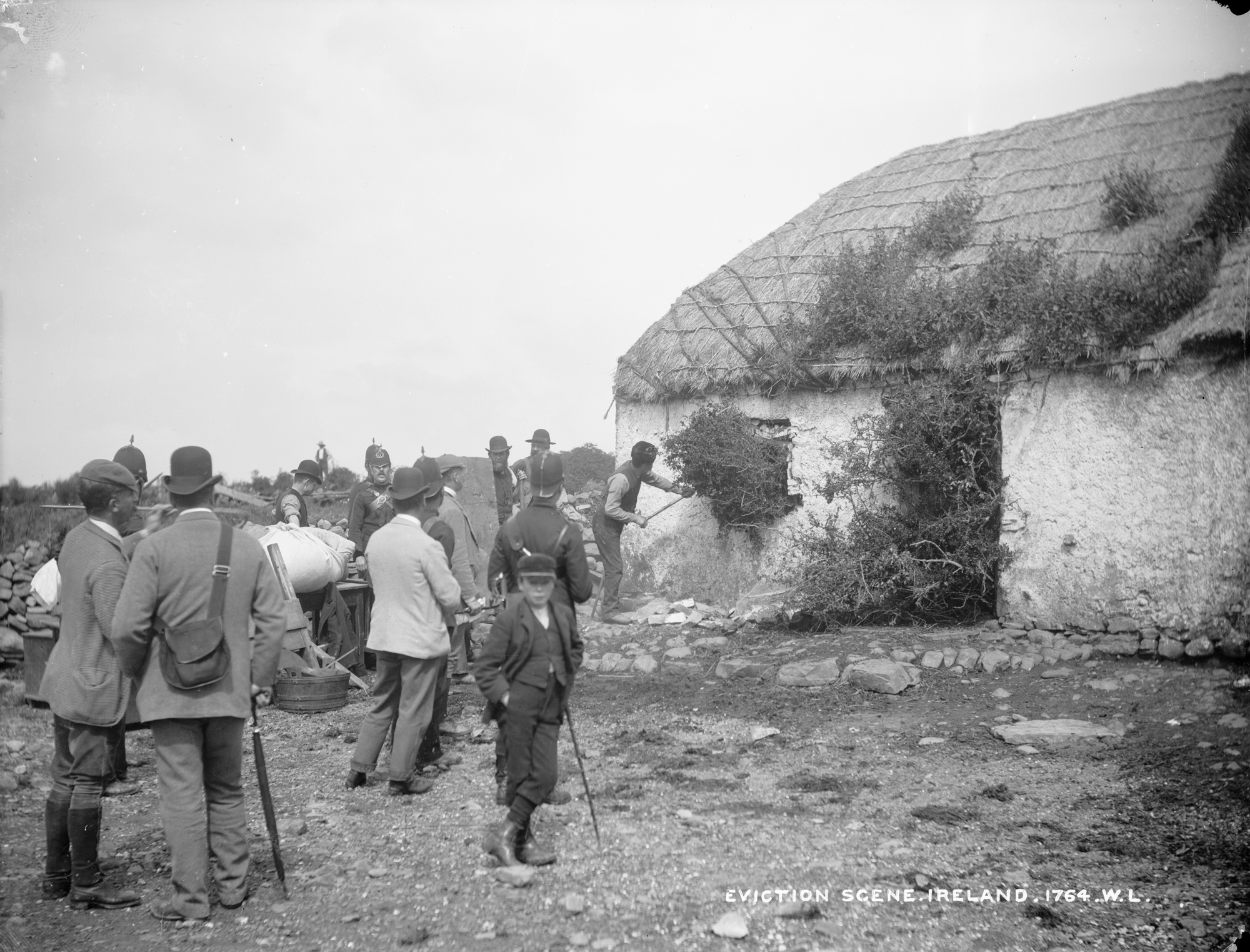
An eviction at Moyasta in the 1880s.

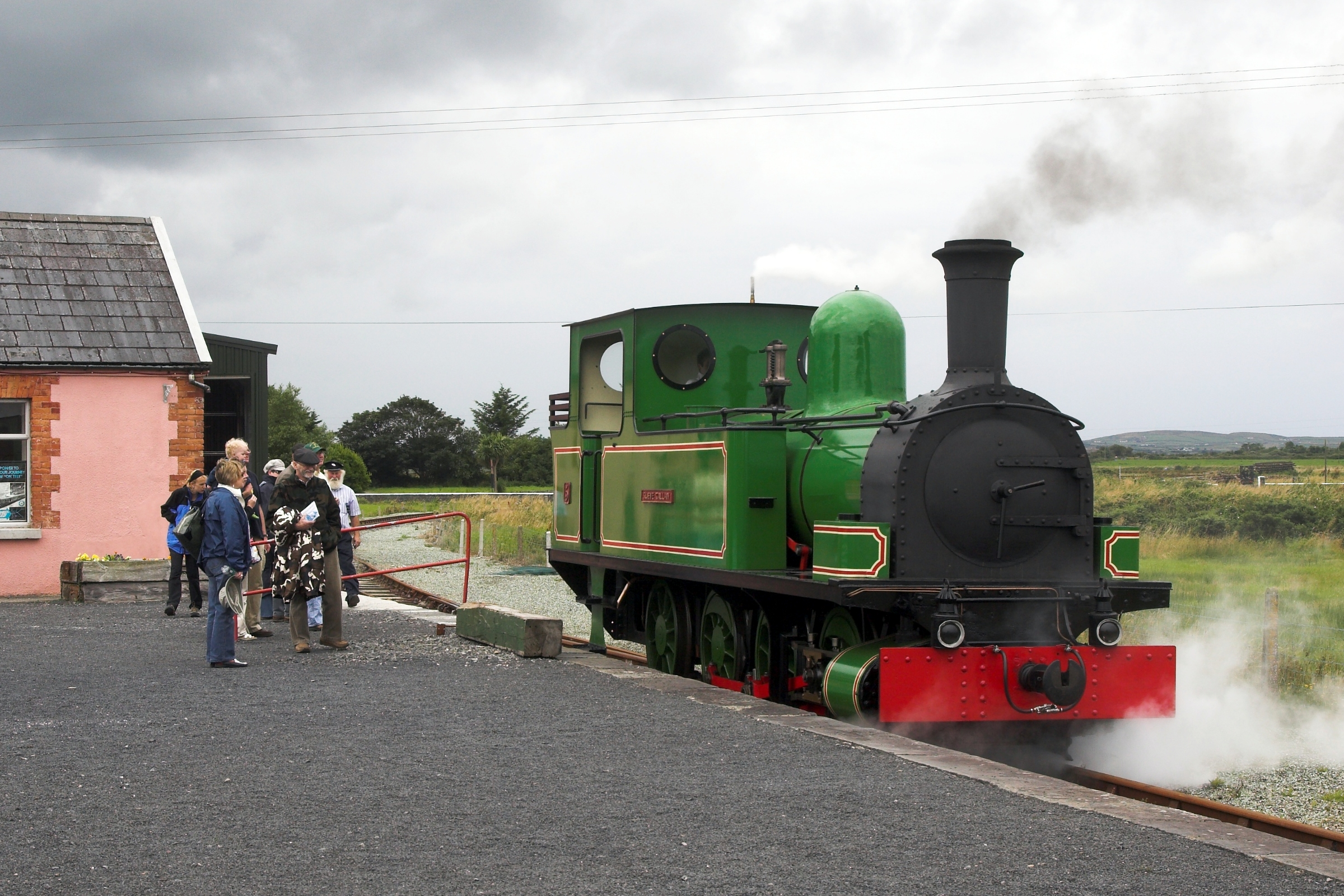
Original WCR locomotive Slieve Callan, now preserved at Moyasta.

== See also ==
- List of towns and villages in Ireland
