= St Vincent's Magdalene Laundry =

St Vincent's Magdalene laundry was a laundry run by the Religious Sisters of Charity based in Cork. Beside St Vincent's laundry is St Vincent's secondary school that was also run by the sisters.

== History ==
Children of women who were “inmates” to the laundry attended the school next door to where their mothers were accommodated and working. The laundry ceased operation in 1991. In 1994 the name of the facility changed to St Vincent's Care Home for those with intellectual disabilities.

Women who worked in the laundry were not allowed to leave the dorm, building or land until standards fell. The Health Service Executive (HSE) was given one month to improve standards. The last Magdalene Laundry closed on 25 September 1996.

An apology was issued by the Irish government to the surviving residents of the laundries in 2013.

In 2003, 2016, 2017, 2018 a woman called Eileen, a "former Magdalene resident" who knew child survivor Mary Teresa Collins' mother and Mary as a child was pictured beside child Mary at St Vincent's Mass grave at remembrance events in St. Finbarr's Cemetery. In 2018, the group Justice 4 All Women & Children told journalist Róisín Burke that women who had worked in the laundry still lived in the centre. Collins visited the laundry to see her inmate mother Angela Collins. Mary throughout the years requested permission from the religious order for her mother's friends to be in attendance and then in 2018 she obtained permission via HSE. In August 2020, it was reported that women who worked within St Vincent's Magdalene Laundry were still living there.
