= Junior Crehan =

Junior Crehan (born Martin Crehan, 17 January 1908 – 3 August 1998) was an Irish fiddle player who composed a number of tunes that remain popular within the Irish Traditional Music community.

== Biography ==
Crehan was born and raised in Bonavilla, Ballymackea Beg near Mullagh, County Clare on the West coast of County Clare. While his father was not a musician, his mother played the concertina. The Crehans frequently opened their home for social occasions, so live music and was a fixture in their home. Junior first took up the concertina himself, but took an interest in an old fiddle in the house, and took up the process of restoring it himself. When established fiddler Thady Casey heard Crehan play in a pub (having taught himself initially), he offered to tutor him - as a result, Crehan learned the fundamentals of fiddling from Thady, and learned stylistically from both him and his brother, Scully Casey, who was also a respected fiddler. Subsequently, Junior became a sought-after musician for country house dances until their decline in the 1930s (exacerbated in particular by the Public Dance Halls Act of 1935).

According to Muiris Ó Rócháin Crehan was also influenced by Uilleann pipes-player Johnny Doran.

Crehan was encouraged by the folk revivals of the 1950s and later, and involved himself with Comhaltas Ceoltoíri Éireann, at one point serving as president of its Clare branch.

== Playing style ==
Crehan's peers have described his playing as "sweet" and "emotive," and his bowing as "economical." He is said to have relied more on rhythmic variation than on ornamentation, and relying heavily on long rolls when he did use ornamentation. He made extensive use of double-stops, and music writer Barry Taylor suggests this may result from the influence of his friendships with uilleann pipers Willie Clancy and Johnny Doran.

== Compositions ==
A number of tunes currently popular within the Irish Traditional Music community were written by Junior. These include Poll an Mhadra Uisce (The Otter's Holt), written with reference to some otters near his family home that would approach when music was played. A further and even better-known example is "The Mist Covered Mountain", inspired by Mount Callan which can be seen from his home in West Clare. It has been recorded by Matt Molloy, Dervish, Kevin Burke, Kevin Crawford, and numerous others.

== Discography ==
Crehan did not record as a featured artist, but did play on individual selections on these recordings:

- Ceol an Clair, Vol. I (Comhaltas Ceoltóirí Éireann CL 17)
- An Irish Dance Party: The Laichtin Naofa Ceili Band (Dublin Records LP 1007)

== Trivia ==
Crehan often played in Gleeson's Pub in Coore. He did this for about 70 years.
