= Kitty Hayes =

Irish concertina player (1928–2008)

- Born: Katharine Smith; 1928; Fahanlunaghta, County Clare, Ireland
- Died: 17 May 2008
- Occupation: Musician

Kitty Smith Hayes (1928 – 17 May 2008) was a well-known concertina-player in Shanaway, Milltown Malbay, County Clare, Ireland. She came from a musical family, played music as a young woman, and married a musician; but she only found her own fame as a musician in her seventies.

== Biography ==
Hayes was born in the townland of Fahanlunaghta, close to Lahinch. She was the daughter of Peter Smith, a locally well-known concertina player. Hayes started playing at a young age, attracted to the music played by her father. When she mastered the basics, Peter Smith bought her her own concertina. She started playing at local dances.

On one these local dances she met whistle and flute player Josie Hayes, who played in the Laichtín Naofa Céilí Band. They married in 1948 and had seven children; she rarely performed while she was raising her family and caring for her father and husband in their last years.

After Josie Hayes died in 1992, one of her sons encouraged her to return to her concertina. Hayes often played at Gleeson's Pub in Coore. She recorded two albums, the first recorded in the kitchen of her daughter Angela Connaughton.

Hayes died at home in 2008, at about eighty years old.

== CDs ==
- Kitty Hayes: A touch of Clare
- Kitty Hayes and Peter Laban: They'll be good yet

=== Compilations ===
- Around the Hills of Clare
- Keepers of Tradition Concertina players of County Clare

=== Tribute ===
- Kitty Hayes Remembered
