= Tony MacMahon =

Irish traditional musician and broadcaster (1939–2021)

Tony MacMahon (18 April 1939 – 8 October 2021) was an Irish button accordion player and radio and television broadcaster.

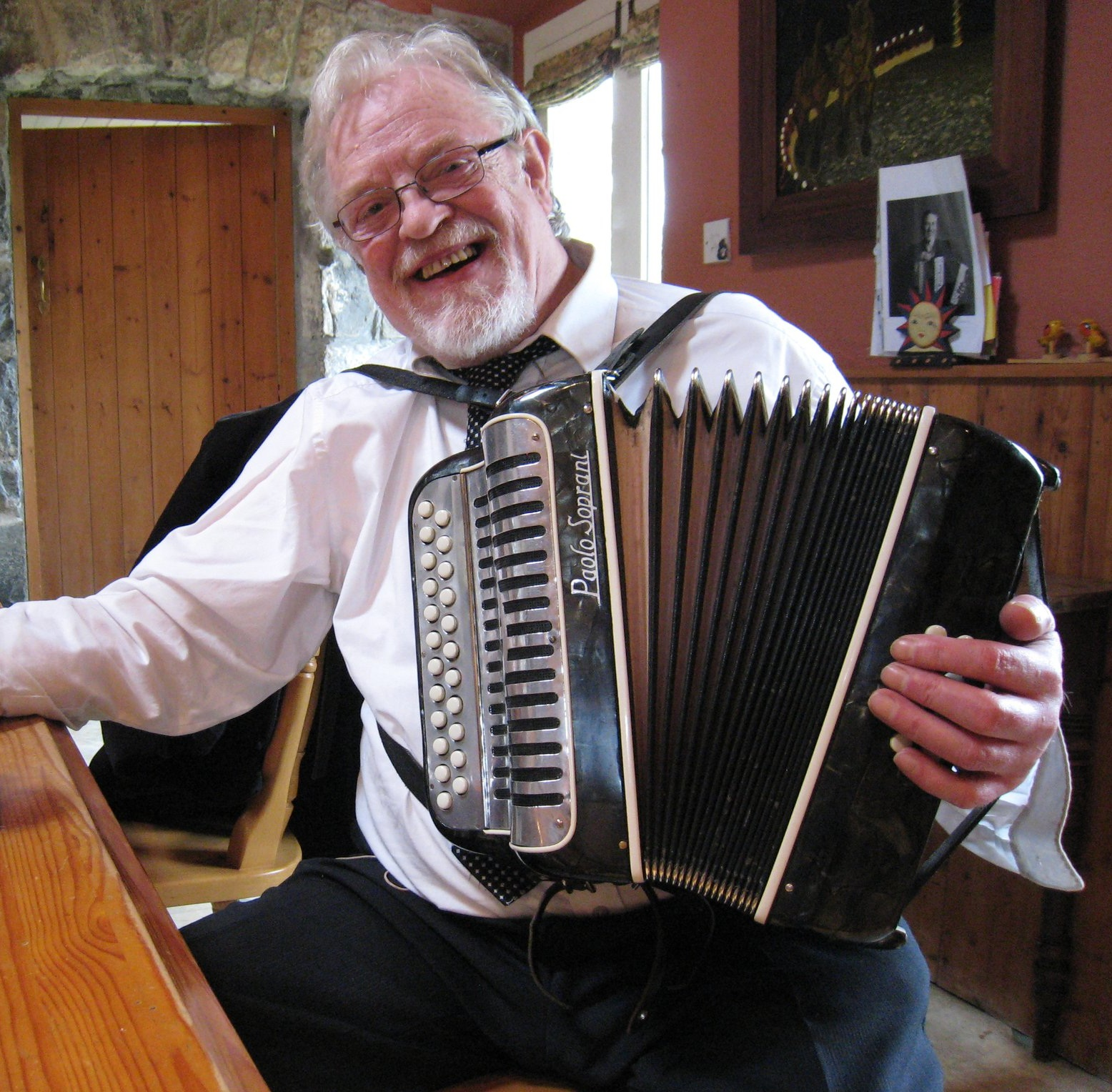
MacMahon with his accordion

MacMahon's chief early inspiration, accordionist Joe Cooley, was a frequent caller at the MacMahon home in Ennis, Co. Clare from 1949 until 1954, when Cooley left Ireland for the United States of America. MacMahon has described the memory of Cooley's music as being "embedded in his DNA.". In 1957, MacMahon moved to Dublin to train as a teacher, where he came into contact with accordionist Sonny Brogan and fiddler John Kelly. Travelling in North America in 1964, in both New York and Dublin, he shared a flat with piper and singer Seamus Ennis, whom he credited as an important influence on his playing of slow airs.

“There is a big difference between playing notes and playing music, millions of people play instrument and make the same sound like a cat that presses its paw against a note in a piano but only the person who feels for music and has a high understanding can play soulfully.”

— Tony MacMahon on Music, Interview during his stay at Madurai

MacMahon played the accordion in the "press-and-draw" style of his mentor Joe Cooley. He was regarded as an exceptionally powerful performer, particularly of slow airs, and has been described as an "iconic figure in traditional music circles". His own attitude to his music, and his chosen instrument, could be ambivalent, however: "I wouldn’t regard my own music either as traditional or indeed anything to write home about. [...] For longer than I care to remember, I have hacked my way through tunes of beauty and tenderness on stage."

MacMahon enjoyed a long career with RTÉ, first as a presenter of traditional-music TV programmes, then as a radio producer (he initiated the long-running programme The Long Note), and returning to television with The Pure Drop and Come West Along the Road. The Green Linnet was a 1979 television series documenting MacMahon's travels through Western Europe with banjoist Barney McKenna in a green Citroën 2CV van (nicknamed The Green Linnet). MacMahon retired from RTÉ in 1998.

MacMahon frequently voiced strong criticism of modern trends in the performance of Irish traditional music, and of growing commercialism in particular. His address to the 1996 Crossroads Conference provides a summary of his views.

In 2014, MacMahon announced he was unable to continue public performances due to Parkinson's disease. However, in a November 2015 interview on RTÉ radio, he stated that after further tests, the diagnosis of Parkinson's had been found to be incorrect.

MacMahon died on 8 October 2021.

== Discography ==
- Traditional Irish Accordion. 1972 - CD re-release 2005.
- I gCnoc na Grai (In Knocknagree) (with Noel Hill, concertina). 1985 - CD re-release 1992.
- Aislingí Ceoil (Music Of Dreams) (with Noel Hill, concertina, and Iarla Ó Lionáird, voice). 1993.
- MacMahon from Clare. 2001.
- Scaoil Amach an Pocaide - Live in Spiddal (with Steve Cooney, guitar). 2014.
- Farewell to Music. 2016.

== See also ==
- Slán leis an gCeol - 2019 documentary on the life of Tony MacMahon

== Source ==
The Companion to Irish Traditional Music, ed. Fintan Vallely, New York University Press, 1999; ISBN 0-8147-8802-5.
