= Coore =

Village in County Clare, Ireland

Coordinates: 52°48′40.67″N 9°21′4.71″W

Coore (also known as Coor) (Irish: Cubhar, meaning 'angle of land') is a village in the parish of Kilmurry Ibrickane, near Mullagh and Milltown Malbay, in County Clare, Ireland. It is made up of two communities: Coore East and Coore West.

Coore West is split into two parts:

- Coore West (east) is the place where the local church is standing. "The Most Holy Redeemer" church is built in 1865–1866, by father Patrick Moran.
- Coore West (west) houses Coore National School and the former "Gleeson's Pub", playground of musicians like Kitty Hayes and Junior Crehan.

== Wind farm ==
In 2011 a company proposed development of a wind farm in the vicinity of Coore. The local people were divided over the plan.

== In popular culture ==
- Junior Crehan made a composition named The Hills of Coore
