= Martin Talty =

Martin Talty (Glendine, Milltown Malbay, 10 November 1920 – 16 March 1983 was an Irish uilleann pipes and flute player.

Talty started playing the tin whistle, later progressing to the flute. It was under the influence of Johnny Doran (who was playing at the Milltown Races in 1936) that he came into contact with the uilleann pipes.

Talty was one of the founding fathers of the Comhaltas Ceoltóirí Éireann in County Clare in 1954. He was also involved in the organizing committee of the first Fleadh Cheoil in Ennis in 1956 and those in Milltown Malbay in 1957 and 1961.

Talty played the uilleann pipes in both the Laichtín Naofa Céilí Band and in The Tulla Céilí Band.

He attended the same primary school as Willie Clancy, and the two developed a life-long friendship, strengthened by playing the same instruments. After Clancy's death, he was one of the founder of the Willie Clancy Summer School.

== Awards ==
- 1981: Sean O'Boyle Award (sometimes named "Gradam Sheáin Uí Bhaoill")

== Personal ==
Talty married Mary (Ciss) Kennelly (1925–2018) in 1962 and then went to England for a year where they lived in Warminster and Epsom Downs. They had two children.

== Trivia ==
As a teenager Talty played Gaelic football with Milltown Malbay GAA. He did not get much playing time there. After discussing that with local business man Tom Malone, they decided to found a new club named Clonbony GAA. Milltown Malbay GAA however objected, and they had to appeal with the Munster Council in Thurles, County Tipperary. They had to cycle up there and stay the night, but won the appeal.
