= Laura Angela Collins =

Human rights activist

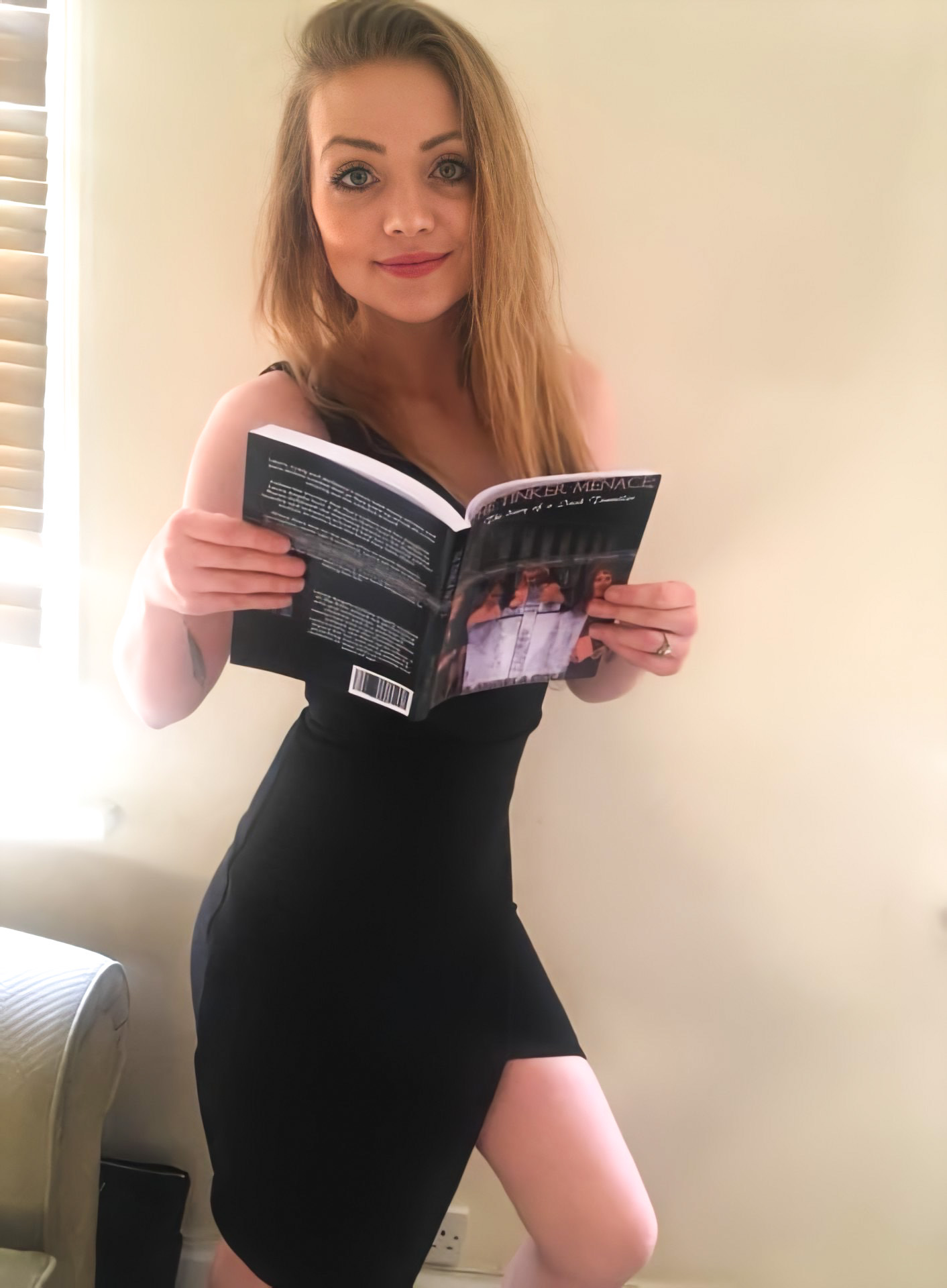
- Born: Laura Angela Collins; London, England
- Occupations: Chairwoman of Justice 4 All Women & Children
- Known for: Human rights activist
- Spouse: Billy Britton
- Children: 3
- Parent: Mary Teresa Collins

Laura Angela Collins is a London-based Irish Traveller activist and author.

== Early life ==
Collins was born and raised in Bermondsey, London to Irish parents and attended the BRIT School for performing arts and technology.

Her grandmother, Angelina Collins, renamed Angela, is buried in a mass grave in St. Finbarr's Cemetery in County Cork with 72 other women, after working for 27 years in a Magdalene laundry.

Collins has campaigned for her grandmother's exhumation and for apologies from the Irish government and Catholic Church.

Collins' mother, Mary Teresa Collins, is a survivor of the industrial school system in Ireland, and was a child resident of St Vincent's Magdalene Laundry in Cork.

== Career ==
Collins chairs an Irish Traveller led survivor support group, she has published research regarding the Irish Traveller community, and the Tuam Mother and Baby Home, where 800 babies are in a mass grave in Tuam, County Galway. She has also undertaken research on Irish institutions such as industrial schools, mother and baby homes, county homes and the Magdalene Laundries and has been a critic of the Mother and Baby Homes Commission of Investigation and past investigations into child abuse such as the Commission to Inquire into Child Abuse and the McAleese Report (formally known as the Report of the Inter-Departmental Committee to establish the facts of State involvement with the Magdalen Laundries).

In July 2015 Collins arranged a protest in Dublin she flew over from London with her family to peacefully stand outside the Dáil Éireann. On the day Laura’s mother Mary stated she believes the mass grave her mother is within is filled with Traveller women subjected to the same inhumane treatment that she received while in the Industrial Schools.

In September 2015 Collins had called on the Irish government to fast track the redress scheme for aging survivors, and to grant free legal aid to people taking a case to the Mother & Baby Homes Commission and for the government and the church to support and fund families to remove their loved ones from mass graves and give them their own burial. She wrote to the Minister for Justice calling for justice for the forgotten families of the victims of institutional abuse. Although it was arranged for a meeting with the Justice Department to deliver the letter, as they approach on their arrival the doors were locked.

On 27 January 2017, Collins and her mother held a service at her grandmother's, Angela Collins, mass grave in St. Finbarr's Cemetery for all the women and children who had died within Irish institutions. Collins said to the TheJournal.ie her grandmother was "a good mum and all the children were healthy, Angelina did not go out and rob a shop and got herself arrested – she was a mother caring for her children. All it is based on is she didn’t have a ring on her finger and was a Traveller," Collins said she believes her grandmother was taken into a county home due to being an unmarried Traveller mother.

On 1 March 2017 Irish Travellers gained ethnic minority recognition within Ireland. Four days after it was issued, on 5 March 2017, Collins reported to the Irish Mirror that "There are many, many Traveller community names that appear on that list of 796 babies and children. My mum was treated differently because of who she was. I hate to imagine how many more Traveller children are in unmarked graves in Ireland. It just makes me so angry. This is just the beginning."

On 18 March 2017, The Sunday Mirror and Irish Sunday Mirror quoted her, saying she "had identified 335 known traveller's surnames in the 796 remains buried at the Catholic-run mother and baby home in County Galway".

On 7 June 2017 Collins organised another protest, in which her mother Mary stood outside the Dáil to call for the Treatment of Traveller children to be investigated and acknowledged. Collins said on the day of the protest that the government should look at the Magdalene laundries, mother-and-baby homes and industrial schools together, as it’s believed they were all connected. In June 2017 Collins sent out press releases to media outlets calling for an official apology to the Traveller community by the government on behalf of the effects around the 1963 commission of itinerancy report.

Collins has campaigned against the National Maternity Hospital being run by the Religious Sisters of Charity.

Collins chairs the organisations Justice 4 All Women & Children, Mincéir Model’s, and Travelling People Worldwide. She has been interviewed on RTÉ Radio 1, Cork's 96FM, and the Niall Boylan Show.

Collins petitioned to ensure the government do not lock away the records of survivors from Commission to Inquire into Child Abuse (Ryan report) for 75 years, she said to journalist Anne Sheridan "I started the petition to show the Government that this is not what survivors and the public want, the effects the laundry had on my mum has never gone away. The large Irish community of survivors in England feel very cut off and distanced from this and, again, their voices are not being heard. The abuse for them has never stopped, this is another cover-up," she told Extra.ie.

Collins issued a Retention of Records Bill 2019 submission to the Minister of Education and Skills. Collins and her mother continue to publicly push for an apology to be issued to their community. In November 2020 she said to the Echo Live in regards to the Mother and baby home commission: "I hope that the report will be transparent and that people get the access to information that they deserve. Throughout the years, it has all been about secrecy." Collins and her mother Mary believe that her grandmother Angela was "one of many Traveller women who ended up in Irish institutions," and they wonder why this has not been recognized. she said "her mother, grandmother and other Travellers who were put into industrial schools, Magdalene laundries and other institutions should receive an apology from the State for what they went through."

In October 2021, Collins created a campaign called Stop Traveller Hate for Hate Crime Awareness Week in response to concerns that social media platforms are either ignorant of the effects of racism against Gypsy, Roma, and Traveller people or do not view it as an important enough issue to address urgently. The campaign lobbied TikTok, Facebook, Twitter, and YouTube, urging them to take hate speech against Gypsies, Roma, and Travellers seriously.

In July 2023, Collins joined the Traveller Movement as the Women’s Equality Intern, where she worked within the organisation to support the development of the Women’s Empowerment Network (WEN), campaigned against gender-based violence, and worked towards equality for Traveller women. Soon after starting this role, she transitioned into the position of Partnerships Coordinator. In this role she led on projects, including the development of toolkits for schools about Gypsies, Roma, and Travellers, and the creation of an inspirational historical timeline highlighting notable Romany Gypsy, Roma, and Traveller women.

On September 2023, Collins organised a screening of Never Going to Beat You at the Irish Embassy in London, focusing on domestic abuse within the Irish Traveller and Romani communities. Following the film, Collins participated in a panel discussion, addressing the importance of educating young people about healthy relationships, and the need for more support for those affected by abuse. The event aimed to raise awareness and stimulate important conversations around these issues.

On November 30, 2024, in response to the treatment of Romany Gypsies and Travellers by Greater Manchester police during the Manchester Christmas markets, Collins organised a protest in London to call for an end to systemic prejudice, as well as for accountability and reform. On the day of the protest, Collins said: “We are demanding accountability for the systemic problem of discrimination and police violence against our communities. We are calling for a full investigation into these abuses and immediate changes to ensure our communities are treated with dignity, respect, and equality.”

== Awards ==
In 2019 Collins won the first ever Traveller Pride award (arranged by the Irish Traveller Movement), in the intersectionality category, which was awarded to her by Catherine Corless.

== Books ==
- The Tinker Menace; the diary of an Irish Traveller, independently published, ISBN 9781091090767 (2019)
