= Na Píobairí Uilleann =

Irish musical nonprofit organization

- Pipers Club
- Abbreviation: NPU
- Predecessor: Dublin Pipers Club
- Formation: 1968
- Founder: Breandán Breathnach and other pipers
- Type: Irish Music
- Purpose: Promotion of the Uilleann pipes and Irish music
- Headquarters: 15 Henrietta Street
- Coordinates: 53°21′09″N 6°16′12″W
- Official language: Irish, English
- Chairman: Caoimhín Mac Aoidh
- Secretary: Mikie Smyth
- Board of directors: Pamela Schweblin, Peter Browne, Rick Lines, Patricia Logan, Barra McGrory, Rita Farrell, Mickey Dunne
- Staff: Gay Mc Keon (CEO)
- Website: pipers.ie

Na Píobairí Uilleann (Irish: [n̪ˠə ˈpʲiːbˠəɾʲiː ˈɪl̠ʲən̪ˠ]; meaning "The Uilleann Pipers") (NPU) is a non-profit organization dedicated to the promotion of the Irish Uilleann pipes and its music.

== Organisation ==
NPU was founded in 1968 under the impetus of researcher and collector Breandán Breathnach and pipers such as Seamus Ennis, Leo Rowsome and Paddy Moloney (of the Chieftains), in order to promote the uilleann pipes and its music. A Tionól (meeting) of pipers in Bettystown Co Meath in April 1968 had been organised by Breathnach, Seán Reid and Séamus Mac Mathúna, who wrote to some 100 pipers in Ireland and abroad for a gathering to revive piping.

Its headquarters are located at 15 Henrietta Street, Dublin, in a restored Georgian building with facilities for many activities. Membership of the organisation is now spread throughout Ireland, England, Scotland, Continental Europe, North America and Australia. Among the notable musicians associated with NPU are:

- Sean McAloon, piper and pipe-maker from County Fermanagh
- Séamus Ennis, piper
- Leo Rowsome, piper and pipe-maker
- Mick O'Brien, piper from Dublin
- Liam O'Flynn, one of the best-known pipers
- Paddy Keenan, one of the top pipers
- Sean Potts, served as chairman from 1988 to 2002 and then as honorary president to 2014.
- Pat Mitchell, Dublin piper, teacher and collector of tunes.

== Activities ==
The goals and activities of the organization are numerous. Regular classes on piping technique, pipe making, and reed making are taught to students of all ages and abilities. NPU is also making a major effort to re-master and re-release recordings of deceased masters of the instrument as well as record living masters. The organization offers a wide range of tutorial materials including DVDs, CDs, and books.

== Recordings (selection) ==
- Johnny Doran Master Pipers - Volume 1, Na Píobairí Uilleann, 1988
- Patsy Touhey The Piping of Patsy Touhey, Na Píobairí Uilleann, 2005
- Robbie Hannan, The Tempest. Na Píobairí Uilleann, 2008. Vol. 3 of the series Ace and Deuce of Piping.
- Paddy Keenan, Mick Coyne, Nollaig Mac Carthaigh: Piper’s Choice Volume 3, 2010

== Books (selection) ==
- Reedmaking Made Easy, Dave Hegarty, Na Píobairí Uilleann, Dublin, 1983
- Music for the Irish Pipes, Joe Doyle, Na Píobairí Uilleann, Dublin, 2016

== See also ==
- Music of Ireland
- Uilleann pipes
