= Elizabeth Crotty =

- Born: Elizabeth Markham; 6 December 1885 near Cooraclare, County Clare
- Died: 27 December 1960 (aged 75) Kilrush, County Clare
- Genre: Traditional Irish
- Occupation: Musician
- Instrument: Concertina

Elizabeth Crotty, better known as Mrs. Crotty (née Markham; 6 December 1885 – 27 December 1960), was an Irish concertina player.

Crotty began gaining traction in the 1950s in the wake of the Comhaltas Ceoltóirí Éireann. She participated in this movement of musicians from an early stage. When a local branch was founded in County Clare, Crotty was elected president. She kept this position until her death in 1960.

Crotty did not make any commercial recordings. The RTÉ had made a few recordings for their programs and they used one for their commemoration LP of 50 years RTÉ in 1976.

Crotty was the namesake of the "Eigse Mrs Crotty" Traditional Music School and Festival, a yearly music festival in July in Kilrush. This festival was held from 1996 to 2009.

== Personal life ==
Crotty was born Elizabeth Markham near Cooraclare, County Clare.

In 1914 she married Michael ("Miko") Crotty and moved to Kilrush. Miko had been in the United States for a couple of years and used the money earned over there to buy a public house on the Market Square in Kilrush, now known as "Crotty’s Pub". Crotty was the mother of two children, a son named Paddy and a daughter named Peggy.

Elizabeth Crotty died on 27 December 1960 from angina pectoris. She is buried in (old) Shanakyle cemetery.

== Recordings ==
- Keepers of Tradition Concertina players of County Clare
- 'Concertina Music from West Clare' (1999, RTÉ)

== See also ==
- Nell Galvin
