= Sindy Joyce =

Activist-cum-academic

Dr. Sindy Joyce is an Irish Traveller human rights activist and academic sociologist. In January 2019 she became the first Irish Traveller to obtain a doctorate from an Irish university. Her doctoral thesis funded by the Irish Research Council, "Mincéirs Siúladh: An ethnographic study of young Travellers’ experiences of urban space", explored the interaction of young Travellers with the settled community and the Gardaí in Galway city.

== Publications ==
- Sindy Joyce, "Divided Spaces: An examination of everyday racism and its impact on young Travellers' spatial mobility", Irish Journal of Anthropology, 18/1 (2015)
- Sindy Joyce, Margaret Kennedy and Amanda Haynes, "Anti-Traveller and Anti-Roma Hate Crime in Ireland", in Critical Perspectives on Hate Crime: An Irish Perspective, edited by A. Haynes, J. Schweppe, and S. Taylor, London: Palgrave Macmillan, 2017.

== Awards ==
In 2014 Joyce received a Traveller Pride Award for Education. On 4 April 2019 Michael D. Higgins, the President of Ireland, appointed her to his Council of State.
