= Tommy Reck =

- Born: 8 November 1921; The Liberties, Dublin, Ireland
- Died: 1991 (aged 69–70)
- Instruments: Uilleann pipes

Thomas "Tommy" Joseph Reck (8 November 1921 – 1991) was an Irish uilleann piper, known for his discography of traditional Irish music. Born in the Liberties area of Dublin, Reck learned to play the uilleann pipes from the age of eleven from teacher "Old John" Potts (1871–1950) who lived just around the corner from his then home in Walkinstown. Potts (father of Tommy Potts), in turn, had been a pupil of Martin O'Reilly of Galway (1829–1904) and several other blind pipers who were brought to Dublin annually around 1900 to play in competition at the Feis Ceoil, an annual music festival.

In the 1930s he played with the Piper's Quartet along with fellow pipers, Leo Rowsome, Willie Clancy and Seán Seery. Reck was a member of the pre-war Pipers Club in Dublin and was its secretary from 1944 to 1947.

== Discography ==
- The Scholar, The Salamanca, Tom Steele, Copley (1955) – a bootleg 78 rpm record
- Two 78 rpm records from 1957 for Claddagh
- It's The Dubliners by The Dubliners, Transatlantic Records (1969) – on the track Cook in the Kitchen
- The Drones and The Chanters (Irish Pipering), Claddagh (1971) – three tracks
- The Stone in the Field, Inisfree (1977, US)
- Humours of Holland CD (1989) – a fifteen-minute live recording of his concert at the NVUP TIONOL in the Netherlands in 1989.
- Seoltaí Séidte: Setting Sail, Gael Linn (2004) - two tracks from 78 rpm recordings previously released by Gael Linn between 1957 and 1961
- Taisce Luachmhar (Valuable Treasure) – The Piping Album, Irish Recording Company Limited (2021) – three tracks from recordings made in the late 1940s and the 1950s
