= Paddy Canny =

- Born: 9 September 1919
- Origin: Glendree, County Clare, Ireland
- Died: 28 June 2008 (aged 88)
- Genres: Irish traditional music
- Instrument: Fiddle
- Years active: ca. 1946–1965, 1996–2004
- Label: Cló Iar-Chonnachta
- Formerly of: Tulla Céilí Band

Paddy Canny (9 September 1919 –28 June 2008) was an Irish fiddle player. In a career that spanned over six decades, Canny was instrumental in popularizing Irish traditional music, both in Ireland and internationally. He gained initial fame in the late 1940s as a founding member of The Tulla Céilí Band, which made its first appearance on RTÉ Radio in 1948 and had positioned itself as the top céilí band in Ireland by the late 1950s.

Canny captured the All Ireland fiddle championship in 1953 and was featured on the landmark 1959 recording, All-Ireland Champions: Violin. Although he stopped performing for large audiences in 1965, he returned briefly in the 1990s to record his critically acclaimed solo album, Paddy Canny: Traditional Music from the Legendary East Clare Fiddler.

== Biography ==
Canny was born in the townland of Glendree in County Clare in 1919, the youngest son of Pat Canny and Catherine MacNamara. Pat Canny was a noted local fiddle player, and taught the instrument to his three sons: Paddy, Mickie, and Jack. He learned techniques from a blind fiddle teacher named Paddy McNamara, who would board with the Canny family in winter and hold lessons in their home. By the time he was in his late teens, Paddy was performing at local crossroads dances, céilís, and weddings.

In 1946, Paddy and several other musicians— among them fellow fiddler P.J. Hayes, pianist Teresa Tubridy, and accordion player Joe Cooley— founded the Tulla Céilí Band at Minogue's Bar in the town of Tulla. The band's popularity grew quickly after they captured first prize at a Limerick fleadh and made their first radio appearance in 1948. The following decade, the band began competing in the All Ireland competitions, initiating a rivalry with the Kilfenora Céilí Band, which won the competition in 1954 and 1955. In 1956, Tulla tied Kilfenora for first place in the Munster competition but lost by a half point in the All Ireland. Tulla won first place the following year, however, and won again in 1960. The band toured Britain and the United States in 1958, delivering a memorable performance at Carnegie Hall in New York on St. Patrick's Day. The Tulla Céilí Band recorded five 78 rpms for HMV in 1956 and recorded their first LP, Echoes of Erin, in 1958.

Paddy individually captured the All Ireland fiddle championship in 1953. In 1961, he married Philomena Hayes, the sister of his bandmate P.J. Hayes. Both Canny and P.J. Hayes were featured on the 1959 album, All-Ireland Champions: Violin, one of the first major commercial recordings of Irish traditional music. Paddy's rendition of the traditional song "Trim the Velvet" was the signature tune of the long-running radio program A Job of Journeywork. By the mid-1960s, however, Canny decided the band's demands were too much of a distraction from his farm (which he considered his primary occupation), and he left the band in 1965.

In the early 1990s, Canny finally returned to the commercial music scene when he appeared on Gearóid OhAllmhuráin's Traditional Music From Clare and Beyond. Canny finally released his first solo album, Paddy Canny: Traditional Music from the Legendary East Clare Fiddler, in 1997. The album was named the year's top traditional album by The Irish Times.

Canny died on 28 June 2008. He was predeceased by his wife, Philomena, and was survived by his daughters, Mary and Rita. A nephew, Martin Hayes, has captured the All Ireland fiddle championship six times and continues to record and perform traditional Irish music.

== Recordings ==
- All-Ireland Champions: Violin (1959), with P.J. Hayes, Peadar O'Loughlin, and Bridie Lafferty. Since re-issued as An Historic Recording of Traditional Irish Music from County Clare and East Galway.
- Traditional Music From Clare and Beyond (1996)
- Paddy Canny: Traditional Music from the Legendary East Clare Fiddler (1997)
- Meet Paddy Canny (2004)
