= Crossroads dance =

Irish dance event

The crossroads dance was a type of social event popular in Ireland up to the mid-20th century, in which people would congregate at the large cleared space of a crossroads to dance. In contrast to the later céilí styles, crossroads dances were generally set dancing or solo dancing. Set dances were performed as quadrilles where two sets of two couples danced facing each other. Solo dances were performed by the locality's best dancers. The crossroads dance declined in popularity in the mid-20th century, due to rural depopulation, musical recordings, and pressure of the Catholic clergy which resulted in the Public Dance Halls Act of 1935 which restricted all dancing to licensed establishments. In the early 1930s, the wooden platforms at crossroads became the focus of standoffs and faction fights between Fianna Fáil and the Blueshirts, with some destroyed by arson.

The phrase "comely maidens dancing at the crossroads", a misquotation attributed to Éamon De Valera's 1943 Patrick's Day radio broadcast, has become shorthand for a maudlin yearning for a vanished Irish rural idyll. The name of John Waters' 1991 memoir Jiving at the Crossroads was a metaphor for Fianna Fáil's continuing cultural relevance in rural Ireland, with Irish dance replaced by jive. The 1996 Irish chart-topping song "Dancing at the Crossroads" anticipated Wexford's victory in that year's All-Ireland hurling final.

There have been some revivals, such as an annual event at Effrinagh, Co. Leitrim.
