= Maeve Donnelly =

Irish traditional fiddle player

- Born: County Galway, Ireland
- Era: Traditional

Maeve Donnelly is one of the top Irish traditional fiddle players known for her unique style within the traditional Irish music genre.

== Life and education ==
Donnelly was born near Kylemore Abbey in Loughrea in eastern County Galway, Ireland. She now lives in Quin, County Clare. She has been playing music since she was a child and won her first All-Ireland Fiddle Competition when she was nine despite her parents not being musicians. However her family has developed a musical tradition, with her three brothers playing the accordion, banjo, and fiddle.

Donnelly went to college in Dublin and when she graduated she moved to live in Clare. She tours and records, and tutors in music, as well as working as a teacher.

She won two further All-Ireland fiddle titles in the 1970s, and the National Slogadh Competition for Solo Fiddle and The Stone Fiddle Competition in County Fermanagh in 1981. She toured the US for the 1976 Bicentennial celebration, and again in 1978 and 1983.

== Discography ==
- Sailing Into Walpole's Marsh - Mairéad Ní Domhnaill, Sean Corcoran, Eddie Clarke, Maeve Donnelly - 1977
- Moving Cloud - Paul Brock, Manus McGuire, Kevin Crawford, Carl Hession, Maeve Donnelly - 1995
- Foxglove - Moving Cloud - 1998
- Her Infinite Variety - Celtic Women (compilation album) - 1998
- Éigse Dhiarmuidín - Live recordings in concert (compilation album) - 2001
- Maeve Donnelly - Maeve Donnelly - 2002
- The Thing Itself - Maeve Donnelly, Peadar O'Loughlin - 2004
- Flame On The Banks - Maeve Donnelly with Tony McManus - 2008
  - Musical analysis of album contents at irishtune.info
