= Public Dance Halls Act 1935 =

Republic of Ireland licensing legislation

The Public Dance Halls Act 1935 is an Act of the Oireachtas which regulates dance halls in Ireland by introducing a licensing system and a tax on admission tickets.

== Background ==
The proposals were based on the recommendations of the 1932 report of the Carrigan Commission into juvenile sex crimes. Other Carrigan Report recommendations were enacted in the Criminal Law (Amendment) Bill, which raised the age of consent and banned artificial contraception. On dance halls, the report stated:

In the course of the Inquiry no form of abuse was blamed more persistently for pernicious consequences than the unlicensed dances held all over the country in unsuitable buildings and surroundings, for the profit of persons who are liable to no control or supervision by any authority. The scandals that are the outcome of such a situation are notorious. They have been denounced in pastorals, exposed in the Press, and condemned by clergy, judges and justices, without avail. Before us the Commissioner, speaking for the Civic Guard, said these dance gatherings in many districts were turned into "orgies of dissipation, which in the present state of legislation the police are powerless to prevent." In short, there is no effective legislation to put down this nuisance.

The Public Dance Halls Bill was introduced in 1934 by the then government of Fianna Fáil, and supported by the opposition Fine Gael and Labour parties. It was supported by the Catholic hierarchy. Secular nationalist institutions like the Gaelic League the legislation were seen as beneficial for protecting Irish culture against foreign influence.

== Cultural effect ==
Licensing is administered at the district court, subject to the discretion of the local judge. In the early years of its effect, they were less tolerant of more recently introduced musical styles, such as set dancing (seen as "foreign") and jazz dance clubs. However, it also disadvantaged many traditional Irish musical activities, such as private house dances and crossroad dances, forcing spontaneous and social music and dance into a controlled and commercialized environment. This set the conditions for the predominance of the céilidh, with its large and loud musical ensembles and wide open dance spaces. The ceilidh arose at the expense of older traditional music, which declined in popularity for decades until the creation of the Comhaltas Ceoltóirí Éireann, and later the Folk Revival brought new attention to traditional Irish music.

== Current status ==
The Act remains in force, with amendments. Nightclubs may be subject to stricter conditions in some districts than in others, depending on the particular judge. The Irish Nightclub Industry Association has described the legislation as "archaic". In 2001 there was confusion about whether the Act applied to lapdancing clubs.
