= Mary Teresa Collins =

Irish Traveller institution survivor

- Born: 1960s Ireland
- Occupation: Co-founder
- Known for: Irish Traveller abuse survivor, activist, human rights activist
- Children: 3

Mary Teresa Collins is an Irish Traveller survivor of Irish institutions such as the Magdalene laundries, industrial schools and county homes. Collins co-founded the campaign organisation, Justice 4 All Women & Children.

== Early life ==
Mary Teresa Collins was born out of wedlock in the 1960s to Irish Traveller parents. Her mother was Angela Collins, from Mayo and her father was Patrick Ward, from Galway. Collins was raised in an abusive industrial school in Cork. There she claims she was made to hate both herself, for being a Traveller, and her mother, who was incarcerated in a Magdalene laundry for 27 years. Collins' mother, while in the laundry, was recommended a hysterectomy a decade before she died of ovarian cancer.

== Career ==
Collins made submissions to the Commission to Inquire into Child Abuse (which gave rise to the Ryan Report), which incorrectly deemed institutions such as the Magdalene laundries to be "private institutions" and therefore outside the scope of their investigations. Participants in that process were bound by a confidentiality agreement (or "gagging order"). Collins broke her gagging order by taking part in a documentary called The Forgotten Maggies. It was the only Irish-made documentary on the subject and was launched at the 2009 Galway Film Fleadh. It was screened on the Irish television station TG4 in 2011, attracting over 360,000 viewers. The women who appeared in the documentary were the first Magdalene women to meet with Irish government officials. They brought national and international attention to the subject. Minister for Justice Alan Shatter and Minister of State for Equality Kathleen Lynch met Magdalene Survivors like Mary in Government Buildings to discuss what some of the women were hoping to get. Collins had made a call for compensation to be extended to children of deceased women who had been in the laundries, and said her mother's unpaid wages should be hers and her sister's inheritance. Auxiliary Bishop of Dublin Éamonn Walsh said at the time that all parties should help the women. However, the Mercy Sisters, the Sisters of Charity and the Good Shepherd Sisters each informed the Justice Minister that they will not be contributing a penny to the living survivors.

After years of campaigning, Collins was a visitor to the Dáil in 2013 to hear the Taoiseach's Magdalene apology be issued, but was disappointed that they excluded the dead women and their children, and did not even provide a minute's silence for the lives lost. Collins then applied to Cork City Council to have her mothers remains exhumed from the mass grave. The council responded in 2014, and stated that although the family had already attempted to gain the permission of those who own the burial plot, unless that permission is forthcoming they will not be allowed to exhume the remains. Collins had sought face to face meetings, wrote letters and emails, which had all been ignored by the Religious Sisters of Charity.

In 2015, Collin's daughter, Laura Angela Collins, established the "Justice 4 All Women & Children" campaign. In July 2015, the Collins women arranged and held their first protest outside the entrance of the Dáil, calling for a Government inquiry into unmarked graves, home to hundreds of other women and children from the Traveller community who suffered just like her and her mother.

In September 2015, Collins travelled to Dublin for a protest the family had arranged. Three generations of the Collins family were present on the day, and delivered a letter to Minister for Justice Frances Fitzgerald, calling for justice for the "forgotten families of the victims of institutional abuse." They were demanding the government fast track the redress scheme for aging survivors. They were also calling for free legal aid for those taking a case to the Mother and Baby Homes Commission of Investigation and for the state and Catholic Church to support and fund those who wish to remove the remains of their loved ones from mass graves. Collins and her family had arranged in advance for a meeting with the Department of Justice to deliver a letter about her family's struggle, but the doors were locked upon their arrival.
