= St. Finbarr's Cemetery =

Cemetery in Cork city, Ireland

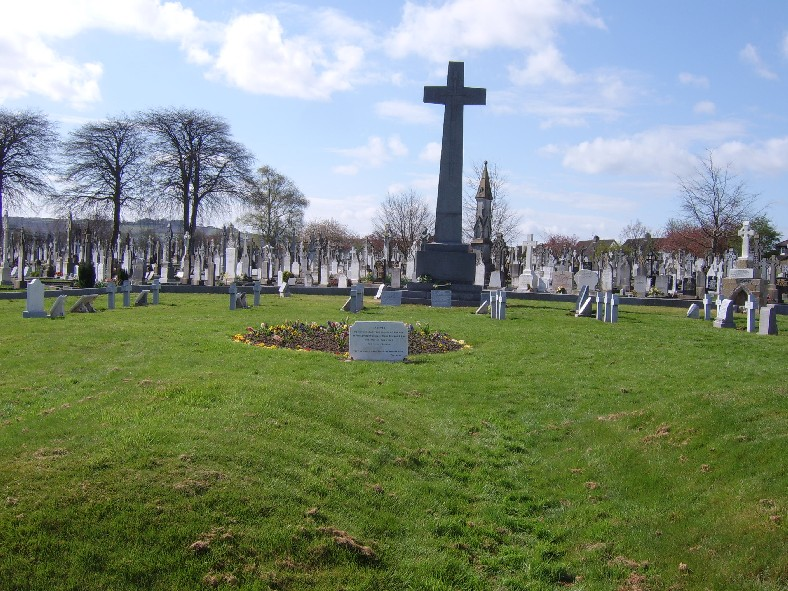
- Republican plot
- Interactive map of St. Finbarr's Cemetery

Details
- Established: 1860s
- Location: Glasheen Road, Cork
- Country: Ireland
- Coordinates: 51°54′N 8°30′W
- Type: Catholic and Church of Ireland
- Style: garden cemetery
- Owned by: Cork City Council
- Size: 8.1 ha (20 acres)
- Find a Grave: St. Finbarr's Cemetery

St. Finbarr's Cemetery (Irish: Reilig Naomh Fionn Barra) in Cork, Ireland, is the city's largest and one of the oldest cemeteries in Ireland which is still in use. Located on the Glasheen Road, it was first opened in the 1860s. The entrance gateway was erected circa 1865, and the mortuary chapel consecrated in 1867.

Many of the early burials were of the wealthy citizens of the city. Unlike older cemeteries, St. Finbarr's was professionally laid out with numbered pathways and wide avenues.

== Burials ==
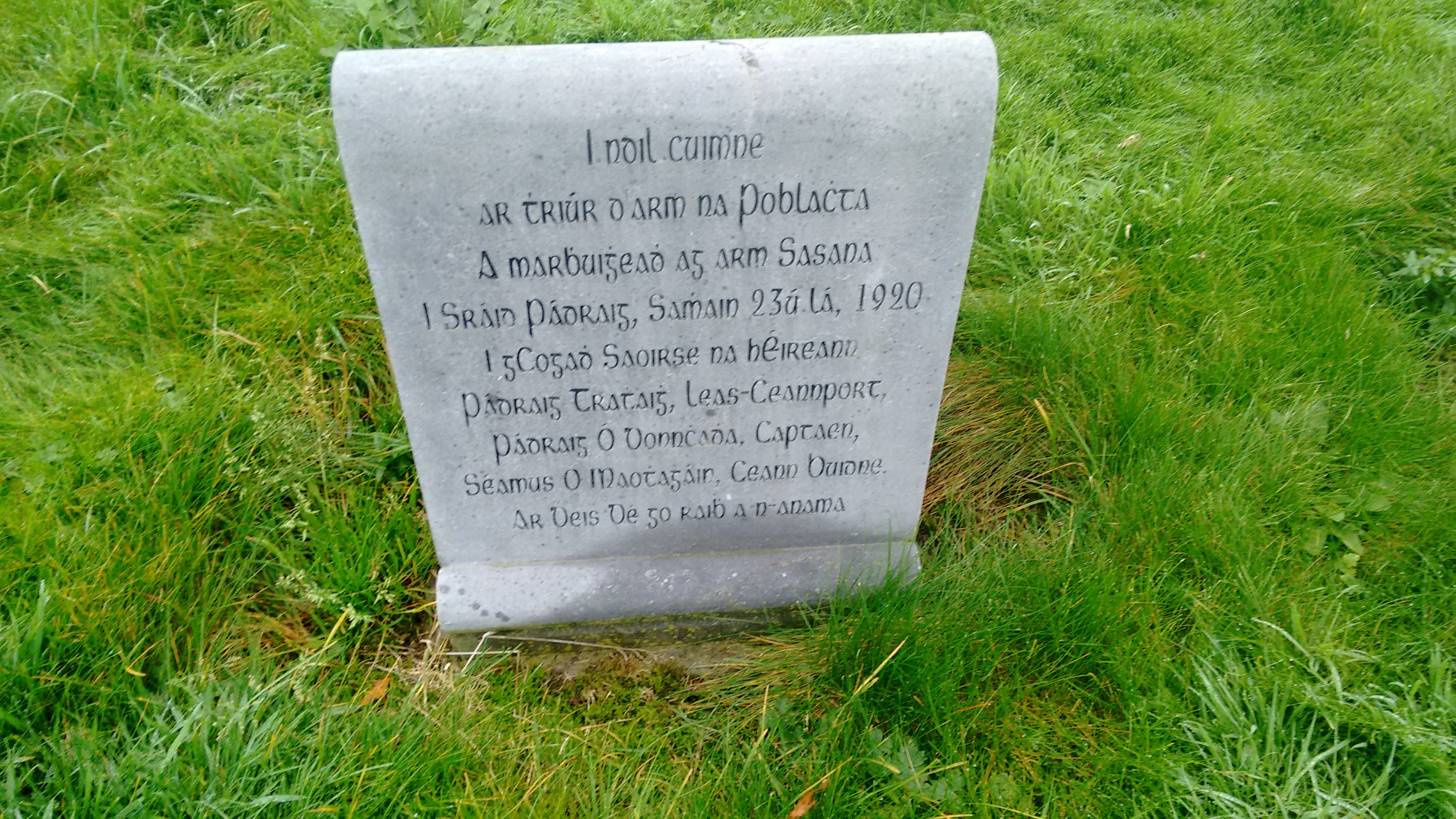
Grave of three Old IRA volunteers, killed by a Black and Tan grenade attack on St Patrick's Street, Cork on 23 November 1920.

Among those buried at St. Finbarr's Cemetery are hurler and Taoiseach Jack Lynch; the antiquarian Richard Rolt Brash who was among the first to decipher writing in the ancient Ogham writing style; the English composer Sir Arnold Bax; and Cork's first Lord Mayor Daniel Hegarty.

St. Finbarr's contains one of the largest burial plots of Irish Republicans who died during the 1920s. There are also more recent burials of members of the Provisional IRA and the Official IRA. This is known as the Cork Republican Plot, and among those buried there are former Lords Mayor of Cork Terence McSwiney and Tomás Mac Curtain, hunger striker Joseph Murphy. In the early hours of 17 March 1963, in protest at the unveiling later that day of a monument in the Republican Plot by President Éamon de Valera, IRA volunteers Desmond Swanton and Jeremiah Madden attempted to blow up the monument. However, during this attempt there was an explosion which killed Swanton and severely injured Madden (who lost an eye and a leg). Other republicans who are buried at St. Finbarr's, but not in the Republican Plot, include Flying Column leader Tom Barry, government minister J. J. Walsh and Dan "Sandow" O'Donovan. Commemorations of the 1916 Rising are held annually, by various groups, at the Republican Plot on Easter Sunday.

The "musicians' corner" contains the graves of Aloys Fleischmann (Senior) and Aloys Fleischmann, and the composer Arnold Bax.

It also contains a mass grave containing the remains of 72 women who died at St Vincent's Magdalene Laundry on Peacock Lane in Cork. A family of an identified woman buried in this grave have called for the site to be investigated.
