= The Tulla Céilí Band =

Irish céilí band

- Past members: Paddy Canny; P.J. Hayes; Teresa Tubridy; Joe Cooley

The Tulla Céilí Band is an Irish céilí band.

== History ==
The band was founded in 1946 by Paddy Canny, fellow fiddler P.J. Hayes, pianist Teresa Tubridy, and accordion player Joe Cooley at Minogue's Bar in Tulla, County Clare, Ireland. They were formed in order to compete at the Limerick Fleadh Cheoil. Their initial repertoire came very much from local sources, along with Galway tunes from Joe Cooley.

The band won first prize at Féile Luimní the following year and made their debut radio performance broadcast in 1948. In the following decade, they competed in the All Ireland competitions, initiating a rivalry with the Kilfenora Céilí Band, which won the competition in 1954 and 1955. In 1956, Tulla tied Kilfenora for first place in the Munster competition but lost by a half point in the All Ireland. Tulla won first place the following year, however, and won again in 1960. The band toured Britain and the United States in 1958, delivering a memorable performance at Carnegie Hall in New York on St. Patrick's Day.

In 2008, An Post issued a stamp featuring the band.

== Band members ==
Regular band members in the period 1946 - 1997:

- Fiddle: Paddy Canny - Bobby Casey - Francie Donnellan - Mark Donnellan - Martin Hayes - P.Joe Hayes - Dr. Bill Loughnane - Michael Murphy - Bert McNulty - Peter O'Loughlin - Sean Reid - Jack Shaughnessy - Aggie Whyte
- Flute: Willie Clancy - J.J. Conway - Seamus Cooley - Jim Donoghue - Paddy Donoghue - Michael Falsey - Jennifer Lenihan - Peter O'Loughlin - Jack Murphy - Michael Preston - J.C. Talty - Martin Talty
- Accordion: Sean Conway - Joe Cooley - Sean Donnelly - Haulie McKee - Tony McMahon - Andrew McNamara - Joe McNamara - Paddy McNamara - Pat McNamara - Martin Mulhaire - Paddy O'Brien - Mattie Ryan - Paddy Ryan - Joe Sheehan - Charlie Harris
- Piano: Georgy Byrt - Jim Corry - Seán Reid - Theresa Tubridy
- Uilleann pipes: Willie Clancy - Paddy Donoghue - Peter O'Loughlin - Sean Reid - Martin Talty
- Drums: Michael Flanagan - Martin Garrihy - Jack Keane - Seán Keane - Jimmy Leyden - Jack McDonnell - Martin Vaughan
- Banjo: Seamus Cooley - Brendan Griffin - Martin Hayes
- Vocals: Helen Hayes - Danny Hunt - Martin Vaughan - Mark Gregory

Other musicians played with the band for short periods. Among them: Eamonn Cotter - Geraldine Cotter - Jimmy Kelly - Mary McNamara - Aidan Vaughan.

== Discography ==
=== Singles & EPs ===
- 1956: 78 - A: Reels: The Donegal/George Whites Favourite/The Copper Plate B: Hornpipes: Tim the Turncoat/The Quarrelsome Piper (His Master's Voice No. 1P 1147 - reissued as a 45 rpm 7" single in 1963 as 45-IP 1147)
- 1956: 78 - A: Reels: Dillon's Fancy/Bird in the Bush/The Silver Spear B: Jigs: Lark on the Strand/The Idle Road/Paddy's Return (His Master's Voice No. 1P 1148 - reissued as a 45 rpm 7" single in 1963 as 45-IP 1148)
- 1956: 78 - A: Reels: Sally Gardens/Bay of Potatoes/The Congress B: Hornpipes: The Friendly Visit/Bantry Bay (His Master's Voice No. 1P 1149 - reissued as a 45 rpm 7" single in 1963 as 45-IP 1149)
- 1956: 78 - A: Reels: Jacksons/Buckley's Fancy B: Jigs: The Lark in the Morning/Macs Fancy/Prestons (His Master's Voice No. 1P 1150 - reissued as a 45 rpm 7" single in 1963 as 45-IP 1150)
- 1956: 78 - A: Reels: The Woman of the House/Limerick Lasses/Come West Along the Road B: Medley of Polkas (His Master's Voice No.No. 1P 1151 - reissued as a 45 rpm 7" single in 1963 as 45-IP 1151)
- 1964: 7" EP - Paddy's Return and Other Jigs and Reels (His Master's Voice 7EGC.28 - reprint of select 1956 recordings)

=== Albums ===
- 1958: LP - Echoes of Erin (US release on Dublin Records - re-released on CD in 2004)
- 19XX: LP - The Tulla Céilí Band – All Ireland Champions ’57 (Irish release of Echoes of Erin on Shamrock Souvenir Records)
- 1970: LP and tape- Cladagh Ring
- 1972: LP and tape - Ireland Green
- 1973: LP and tape - Sweetheart in the Spring - Tulla Third Album (Featuring Martin Vaughan)
- 1986: Tape - 40th Anniversary Tape
- 1996: CD and tape - 50th Anniversary, A celebration of Fifty Years
- 2006: CD - 60th Anniversary Celebration
- 2016: CD - 70th Anniversary Celebration
