= Breandán Breathnach =

Breandán Breathnach (1 April 1912 – 6 November 1985) was an Irish music collector and uilleann piper. In addition to collecting Irish music, he is known for his Ceol Rince na hÉireann (Dance Music of Ireland) series.

== Life ==
Breathnach grew up in the Liberties of Dublin, where his father was a silk weaver. His uncle Joe was a player of the uilleann pipes and a member of the Piper's Club. He started learning the pipes from John Potts of Wexford and William Andrews, then with the renowned piper Leo Rowsome.

Breathnach started work as a civil servant with the Department of Agriculture, but in 1965 switched to the Department of Education where he was responsible for collecting music from around Ireland.

In the 1950s he decided to publish some of his music collection. Tunes were contributed by pipers such as his uncle Joe, John Potts, Tommy Reck, Matt Kiernan and Willie Clancy, fiddlers such as John Kelly, Donncha Ó Cróinín, Tommy Potts and Tom Mulligan, flutists and whistlers such as John Egan, John Brennan and Michael Tubridy, and box-player Sonny Brogan. The collection was called Ceol Rince na hÉireann ("Dance Music of Ireland").

The first volume of his collection was published in 1963. A second volume appeared, to great acclaim, in 1976. This included music from, amongst others, James McEnery (Limerick), John Doherty (County Donegal), Micho Russell (County Clare) and Denis Murphy (County Kerry). Additional volumes based on his work were published in 1985, 1996 and 1999.

By the time of his death he had collected over 7,000 tunes. His efforts were responsible for saving numerous tunes and he is generally recognised as a major figure in the preservation and continuation of traditional Irish music.

== Personal life ==
He married in 1943 Lena Donnellan, with whom he had five daughters. His daughter Niamh Bhreathnach was a Labour Party politician and Minister for Education.

== Bibliography ==
- "Willie Clancy the man and his music"', Ceol; 2/3 (1965), 70-77
- Ceol Rince na hÉireann, vol. 1 (1963), vol. 2 (1976), vol. 3 (1985)
- Folk Music and Dances of Ireland (1971), ISBN 1-900428-65-2 . Revised Edition, 1977, ISBN 0 85342 509 4
- "Tribute to Seamus Ennis", Musical Traditions, no. 1 (1983)

== Bibliography ==
- Ó Canainn, Tomás: Traditional Music in Ireland (London: Routledge & Kegan Paul, 1978); ISBN 0-7100-0021-9.
- Ó Riada, Seán: Our Musical Heritage (Dublin: The Dolmen Press, 1982); ISBN 0-85105-389-0.
- Carolan, Nicholas: Breandán Breathnach (1912–1985), in: Ceól vol. 1–2 (1986, p. 3–10.
- Vallely, Fintan: The Companion to Irish Traditional Music (Cork: Cork University Press, 1999; 2nd edition, 2011); ISBN 0-8147-8802-5.
- Irish Music Centre, Boston College
