= Muiris Ó Rócháin =

Irish teacher (1944–2011)

Muiris Ó Rócháin (1944 in Dingle – 17 October 2011 in Milltown Malbay) was a teacher, director of the Willie Clancy Summer School, president of Oireachtas na Gaeilge and folk collector.

Ó Rócháin was a qualified teacher who taught mathematics and Irish in Cahersiveen, Waterville, Dublin and Spanish Point. While working in Dublin he met his wife Una Guerin and followed her to her native place Milltown Malbay, they married in 1970.

Muiris Ó Rócháin was one of the founders of the Willie Clancy Summer School. He was its director for many years.

Over the years, he spent much time to folklore, community life and especially to Irish culture. Many organisations availed of his time and knowledge. Amongst others: Dál gCais, journal on Irish culture, Oidhreacht an Chláir Teo (Clare Institute for Traditional Studies). and The Clare Festival of Traditional Singing.

In 2001 Ó Rócháin was appointed as president of the Oireachtas na Gaeilge, an annually held arts festival of Irish culture.

Ó Rócháin was involved in the creation of three movies:

- 1980: My Own Place, by accordion player Tony MacMahon
- 1991: Story of the Dingle Wren
- 1992: Cur agus Cuiteamh

== Awards ==
- 2010: TG4 Gradam na gCeoltóirí award (musician's award); for his contributions to Irish traditional music
