= Kilfenora Céilí Band =

Kilfenora Céilí Band Banna Céilí Chill Fhionnúrach
- Origin: Kilfenora
- Genres: Irish traditional
- Years active: 1909–present
- Labels: Dolphin Records, Claddagh Records, Castle Communications, Transatlantic Records
- Website: kilfenoraceiliband.com

The Kilfenora Céilí Band (Irish: Banna Céilí Chill Fhionnúrach) is one of the oldest céilí bands in Ireland. It was founded in 1909 in Kilfenora, a village in County Clare.

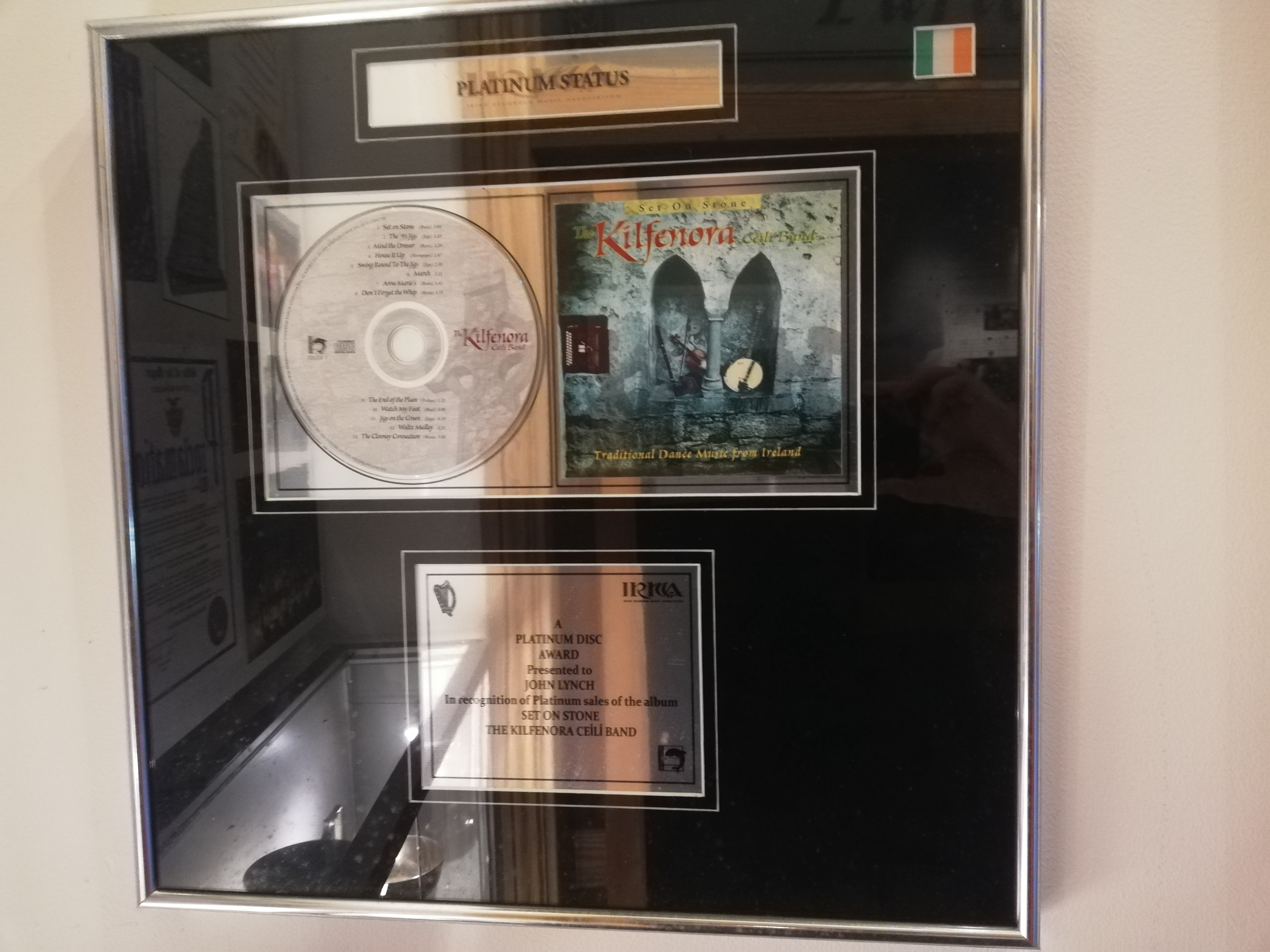
Platinum disc received by the Kilfenora Céilí Band for their album Set in Stone

== History ==
The first group of céilí musicians played in the old schoolhouse in Kilfenora in 1909. A new Catholic priest invited local fiddler Michael Slattery to form a band to play at fundraising dances to help clear parish debts and refurbish the church. It was also an opportunity for musicians to play at local houses or cross road dances.

The members of the band changed over the years. Early players included fiddler John Joe Lynch and his sister Brigid McGrath on concertina, Jim Mulqueeney and Austin Tierney on fiddle, and Jim McCormack on flute. For bigger events, local musicians such as Jimmy Leyden (drums) and Pat Madigan (bass) and McCormack augmented the band.

PJ Lynch started re-organising the band in 1953, and they won three "All-Ireland Fleadh Cheoil" titles in a row, in 1954, 1955 and 1956. Thereafter they became extremely busy on the céilí circuit, travelling and playing all over the country. The busy schedule forced PJ Lynch to step back, and his place as manager of the band was taken over by Kitty Lennane, who also played piano in the band. She retained this position for 40 years.

In the 1960s the band played in England regularly to large crowds at halls in Manchester, Birmingham and London. Things quietened during the 70s and 80s however, due to changes in musical taste. In July 1992 the Kilfenora population gathered to pay tribute to the band as they celebrated their 85th anniversary. The event was broadcast live on RTÉ radio. Then in 1993, John Lynch, son of PJ, took over as bandleader with the intention of re-entering the competition for the All-Ireland Fleadh Cheoil. This was achieved spectacularly by the band repeating its 1950s feat of winning the All-Ireland 4 years in a row (1993–6).

== Band members ==
Membership according to the band's website as of 4 July 2021:

- John Lynch - Banjo
- Fintan McMahon - Piano
- Sean Griffin - Drums
- Anne Rynne and Annemarie McCormack - Fiddles
- Sinéad Heagney: Fiddle & Viola
- Eimear Howley: Fiddle, Viola, Banjo & Mandolin
- Anthony Quigney: Flute, Whistle & Piano
- Garry Shannon - Flute and Whistle
- Claire Griffin: Accordion
- Tim Collins: Concertina
- Brian O’Grady on Double Bass
- Sharon Howley: Cello

== Former Players ==
- Jimmy Ward

== Guest players ==
Over the years the band had many guest players, including Nell Galvin and her son Stephen. That time they played an unnamed reel, that promptly was baptized "Mrs Galvin's" by the Band.

== Discography ==
- All-Ireland Champions For Three Consecutive Years (1959)
- Clare Ceili (1971)
- The Kilfenora Ceili Band (1974)
- The Best Of Traditional Irish Music From Ireland’s Number One Céilí Band (1995)
- Set on Stone (1997)
- Live in Lisdoonvarna (2002)
- Century (2009)
- Chapter Eight (2011)
- Now is the Hour (2015)
- Both Sides Now (2019)
