= Joe Cooley =

Irish traditional accordionist (1924–1973)

- Born: 1924
- Origin: Peterswell, County Galway, Ireland
- Died: 20 December 1973 (aged 48–49)
- Genres: Traditional Irish
- Instrument: Accordion
- Years active: 1940s–1973
- Labels: Gael Linn

Joe Cooley (1924–20 December 1973) was an Irish musician known for his traditional accordion music.

== Biography ==
Cooley was born in Peterswell, County Galway in 1924. Both his parents were melodeon players, and Joe began playing accordion at age 10. As a teen, Joe played in the Midlands area and eventually found himself in Dublin in 1945, where he joined the Galway Rovers Band. There in Dublin, he met musicians Sonny Brogan and Johnny Doran, both of whom were to influence Cooley's musical style.

He was one of the earliest members of the Tulla Céilí Band when, as the St Patrick's Amateur Band, Tulla, they won the ceili band competition at Féile Luimní in 1946. He played with the Tulla on their first broadcast for Radio Éireann in 1948. At the end of that year he left the band to work in London. He rejoined the band when he returned from England towards the end of 1950. He also often played with Galway fiddler Joe Leary.

In 1954 Joe Cooley left for the US. Joe's brother, Seamus Cooley, who played banjo with the Tulla, went on a US trip and made a recording with them. He left the band in 1958 while on tour and stayed in the US. While in New York Joe was involved in the Joe Cooley Ceili Band and the Joe Cooley Instrumental Group. He moved from New York to Chicago and finally to San Francisco. While in San Francisco, Cooley formed the Gráinneog Céilidh band which included accordionist Kevin Keegan, fiddlers Sue Draheim and Will Spires, Eric Thompson, and others. The Cooley-Keegan Branch of Comhaltas Ceoltóirí Éireann in San Francisco is named in honor of Cooley and Kevin Keegan. In America he married Nancy McMahon from Killenana, County Clare.

He is regarded as one of the most accomplished and influential Irish button accordionists. On one occasion, in Miltown Malbay, County Clare, Joe was presented with a beautiful Paolo Soprani C#/D accordion he dubbed "The Box" which would accompany him on his tour of America in the 1970s.

Joe returned to Ireland in the spring of 1973 after becoming ill with cancer. He toured the pubs of Clare and Galway with his friend the banjo player Des Mulkere until shortly before his death in December 1973. His only commercial recordings were not released in Ireland until 1975.

His accordion is now believed to be in the hands of the great Irish accordionist Tony MacMahon of Clare, IE. One of Cooley's enduring legacies is a reel named "Joe Cooley's". Originally named "The Tulla Reel," the tune has since become associated with Cooley and is now a standard in the Irish traditional music repertoire. Cathie Whitesides and other American friends of Joe's have archived many of Joe's tunes on a website, http://www.joecooleytapes.org/.

== Discography ==
- Cooley (Gae-Linn, 1975)
