= Felix Doran (musician) =

Uilleann pipes player

- Born: Ireland
- Died: 1972
- Genres: Irish traditional music, folk music
- Instrument: Uilleann pipes
- Label: Topic Records

Felix Doran (died 1972) was an Irish Traveller who was known for traditional music from the early 1920s to the 1970s as uilleann pipe player. Felix and his brother Johnny Doran are descendants of nineteenth-century Wexford piper John Cash.

== Career ==
Doran was an Irish Traveller uilleann piper who was recorded by Ciaran MacMathuna for RTÉ and by Peter Kennedy and Sean Davies. He was also a horse dealer. Doran and his family were known to entertain at fairs and race meetings in Ireland.

Doran later moved to Manchester and went into the transport business. He did well and became wealthy, and ordered a set of silver uillean pipes from an engineer in Germany.

A recording of some of Doran's music, Felix Doran – The Last Of The Travelling Pipers, was released in 1976 by Topic Records (four years after Doran's death in 1972).
