= Johnny Doran =

- Born: c. 1908; Rathnew, County Wicklow, Ireland
- Died: 19 January 1950 Athy, County Kildare, Ireland
- Genre: Irish traditional music
- Occupations: Musician, traveller
- Instrument: Uilleann pipes
- Years active: c. 1930 – 1948

Johnny Doran (c.1908 – 19 January 1950) was an Irish uilleann piper.

== Life and family ==
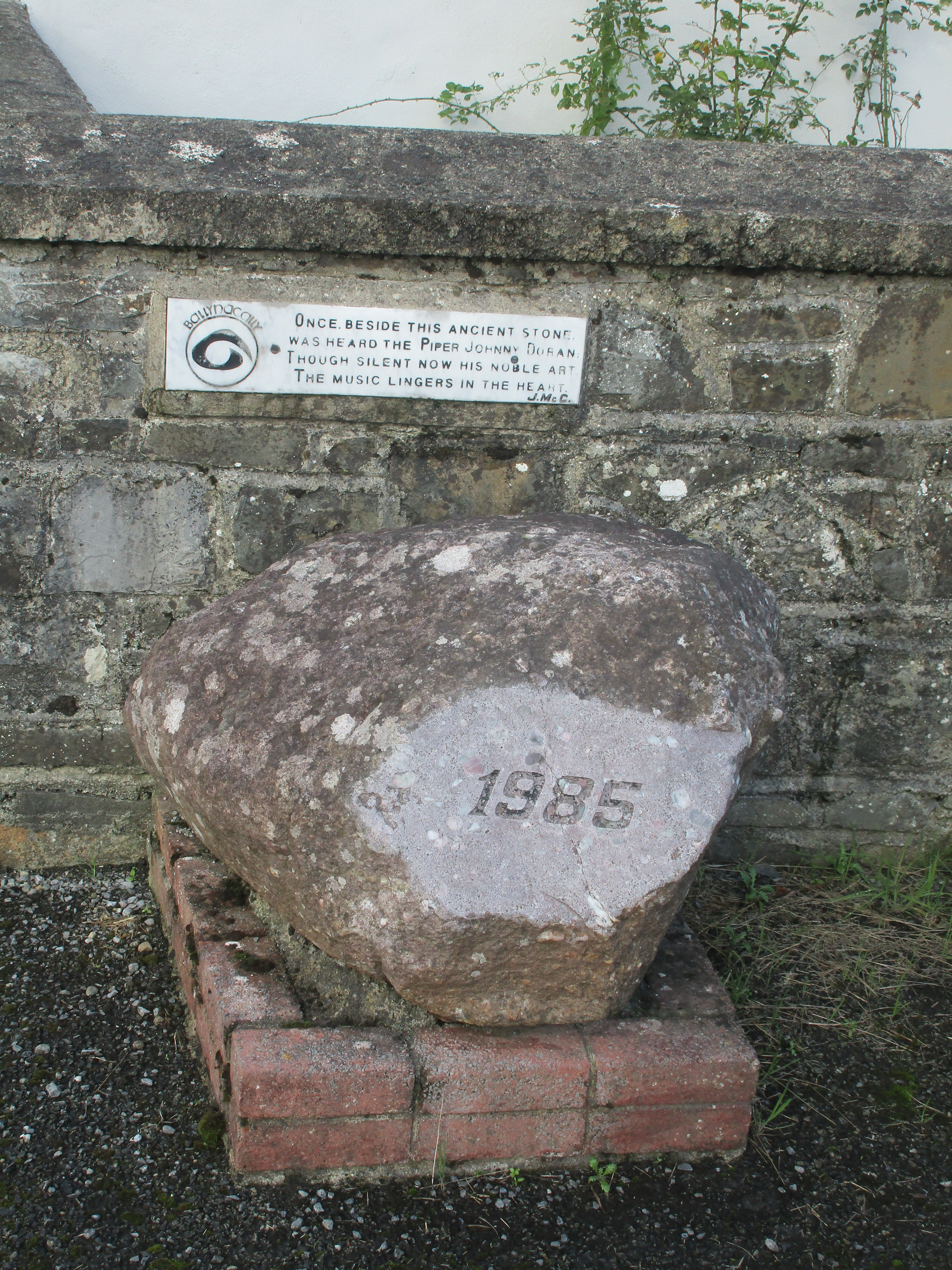
Ballynacally: stone used by Doran when playing his pipes

Johnny Doran was born around 1908 in Rathnew, County Wicklow. His family were Travellers with a distinguished musical heritage; his father John Doran and brother Felix Doran were also pipers, and his great-grandfather was the celebrated Wexford piper John Cash.

By his early twenties, Doran was working as an itinerant musician, travelling with his family from town to town in a horse-drawn caravan and playing for money at fairs, races and sporting events. His playing is said to have inspired the young Willie Clancy and Martin Talty to take up piping as a career.

On 30 January 1948, Doran's caravan was parked on waste ground near Back Lane in Dublin's Cornmarket area. It was very windy, and a brick wall collapsed on the caravan, and also on Doran, who was outside lacing up his shoes. Doran was completely covered by bricks and rubble. His lower back was injured during the rescue process as, according to one of his daughters, he was pulled free from the debris. Johnny was afterwards paralysed from the waist down. His injuries led to continuing ill health and he died on 19 January 1950 in Athy, County Kildare. He is buried in Rathnew cemetery.

Johnny Doran had nine children, four sons and five daughters.

== Recordings ==
Only one recording of Johnny Doran's playing was ever made. In 1947 the fiddle player John Kelly, a friend of Doran's, was concerned about the piper's health. He contacted Kevin Danaher of the Irish Folklore Commission, who arranged for a recording to be made on acetate disks.

The following tunes were recorded:

1. Coppers and Brass/The Rambling Pitchfork/The Steampacket (Jigs/Reel)
2. The Bunch of Keys/Rakish Paddy/The Bunch of Keys (Reels)
3. Tarbolton/The Fermoy Lasses (Reels) (With John Kelly)
4. An Chúileann (Air)
5. Sliabh na mBan (Air)
6. Colonel Fraser/My Love Is In America/Rakish Paddy (Reels)
7. The Sweep's/The Harvest Home/The High Level/The Harvest Home (Hornpipes)
8. The Job of Journeywork (Set Dance)
9. The Blackbird (Set Dance)
10. The Sweep's/The Harvest Home/The High Level/The Harvest Home (Hornpipes)

== Style and legacy ==
During his lifetime, Doran was one of the most admired traditional musicians in Ireland. On the basis of his recordings, the traditional music scholar Breandán Breathnach ranked him alongside the fiddle player Michael Coleman as one of the greatest Irish traditional musicians ever recorded.

His unusually rapid and fluent style influenced later pipers such as Paddy Keenan and Davy Spillane.

== Discography ==
- The Master Pipers, Volume 1 original acetate disks, 1947.
- The Bunch of Keys audio tape, 'Comhairle Bhéaloideas Éireann' (CBÉ 001), 1988.
- Johnny Doran ~ The Master Pipers, Volume 1 re-mastered CD, 'Na Píobairí Uilleann' (NPUCD011), 2002.

== Bibliography ==
- Tuohy, David; Ó hAodha, Mícheál (2008). Postcolonial Artist: Johnny Doran and Irish Traveller Tradition. UK: Cambridge Scholars Publishing. ISBN 978-18-4718-441-2.
