= Jimmy Ward (banjo player) =

- Born: 1909
- Origin: County Clare, Ireland
- Died: 1987 (aged 77–78)
- Genres: Traditional Irish
- Occupation: Shopkeeper
- Instruments: Banjo, lilting

Jimmy Ward (1909 in Tullagha, Kilfenora – 1987 in Milltown Malbay) was a well known Irish traditional banjo player and lilter out of Milltown Malbay, County Clare, Ireland.

Ward originally played the flute, piccolo and the whistle, but changed to the banjo in the 1940s.

Ward was one of the founders of the renewed Kilfenora Céilí Band in 1927. He was still a part of the band when they won three consecutive All Ireland championships at the Fleadh Cheoil.

He is the namesake of Jimmy Ward's Jig.

In 1974, Ward decided to leave the Kilfenora Céilí Band. He started a new band named Bannermen with PJ Murrihy and Michael Sexton

Later in life, Ward moved to Milltown Malbay, where he opened a small shop. In the early seventies he had a severe car crash in Inagh.

Ward died in 1987.

== Recordings ==
=== With the Kilfenora Céilí Band ===
LPs

- Clare Céilí, ?, EMI
- The Kilfenora Céilí Band, 1974, Transatlantic

CDs

- Traditional Irish Fiddle Music, 1998 (remastered version of The Kilfenora Céilí Band)

=== With the Laichtín Naofa Céilí Band ===
LPs

- Come to an Irish Dance Party, 1959

CDs

- Come to an Irish Dance Party, 2008. A re-issue of the historic recording of 1959 digitally re-mastered.
