= Willie Clancy (musician) =

Irish musician (1918–1973)

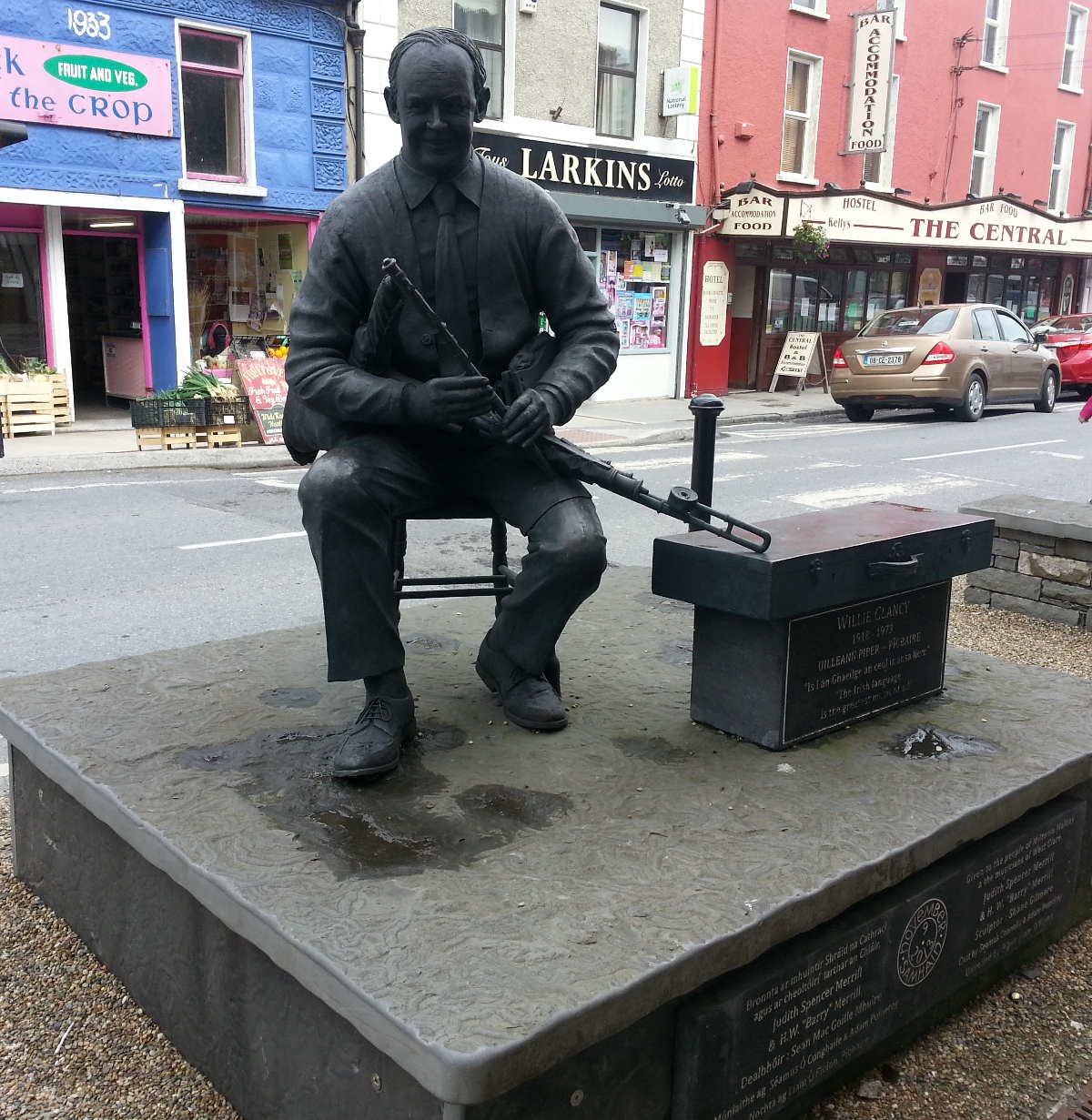
- A statue of Clancy in his hometown of Miltown Malbay

Background information
- Born: 24 December 1918; Miltown Malbay, County Clare, Ireland
- Died: 24 January 1973 (aged 54) Galway, Ireland
- Genres: Irish traditional music
- Occupations: Musician, carpenter
- Instruments: Uilleann pipes, irish flute, tin whistle.
- Years active: 1938–1973

Willie Clancy (24 December 1918 – 24 January 1973) was an Irish uilleann piper, flute player and whistle player.

== Early life ==
Clancy was born into a musical family in the outskirts of Milltown Malbay, County Clare. His parents (Gilbert Clancy and Ellen Killeen) both sang and played concertina, and his father also played the flute. Clancy's father had been heavily influenced by local blind piper Garret Barry and passed much of Barry's music on to Willie.

== Career ==
Willie started playing the whistle at age 5, and later took up the flute. He first saw a set of pipes in 1936 when he saw Johnny Doran playing locally. He obtained his first set of pipes two years later. His influences included Leo Rowsome, Séamus Ennis, John Potts, and Andy Conroy. Clancy won the Oireachtas competition in 1947. Unable to earn a living from music he emigrated to London where he worked as a carpenter.

Returning to Milltown Malbay in 1957 he recorded some influential 78 rpm recordings for the Gael Linn label - among them the classic reel selection "The Old Bush/The Ravelled Hank of Yarn." The next decades he stayed in Milltown Malbay.

Clancy married Dóirín Healy in 1962. The Willie Clancy Summer School was established in his honour in 1973, by Clancy's friends Junior Crehan, Martin Talty, Sean Reid, Paddy Malone, Paddy McMahon, Frankie McMahon, Jimmy Ward, JC Talty, Harry Hughes, Michael O Friel, Séamus Mac Mathúna, and Muiris Ó Rócháin. He was also the subject of a major television documentary "Cérbh É? Willie Clancy" on TG4, first broadcast in November 2009. In this programme, one of a series in which major figures in contemporary traditional music, profile and pay homage to a master of their craft from a bygone age, Peter Browne traced the life and legacy of Clancy.

== Discography ==
- several tracks on late 1950s Gael Linn 78 rpm discs, later reissued on the LP Na Ceirniní 78(CEF 075, 1978) and the double CD set Seoltaí Séidte (CEFCD 184, 2004)
- Irish Jigs, Reels & Hornpipes, 10-inch disc with fiddler Michael Gorman, recorded in London, (Folkways Records, New York). For details and contents, see
- The Minstrel from Clare (Topic Records, London, 1967), reissued on CD by Green Linnet. For details and contents, see
- The Breeze From Erin (Topic Records. London 1969), compilation with 3 tracks by Willie, re-issued as a download in 2014
- several tracks on the LP Seoda Ceoil 1, (Gael Linn, 1968), reissued on CD in 2013 (see gael-linn.ie)
- The Pipering of Willie Clancy, Vol. 1 (Claddagh Records). For details and contents, see
- The Pipering of Willie Clancy, Vol. 2 (Claddagh Records). For details and contents, see
- The Drones and the Chanters Vol. 1 with various pipers (Claddagh Records) For details and contents, see
- Willie Clancy, The Gold Ring (RTÉ 276CD), 2-CD Set (65 tracks), RTÉ 2009.

In 2009 The Choice Wife from The Breeze From Erin was included in Topic Records 70 year anniversary boxed set Three Score and Ten as track twelve on the third CD.

== Sheet Music ==
A book of transcriptions of Clancy's tunes was published in 1976 and updated in 1993.

== Bibliography ==
- Mitchell, Pat, ed. (1976), The Dance Music of Willie Clancy, Cork: Mercier Press ISBN 0-85342-465-9
  - --do.--Cork: Ossian Publications, 1993. ISBN 0-946005-72-9.
- Vallely, Fintan (1999), The Companion to Irish Traditional Music, New York: New York University Press. ISBN 0-8147-8802-5.
