= Mullagh, County Clare =

Village in County Clare, Ireland

Mullagh Mullach
- Village
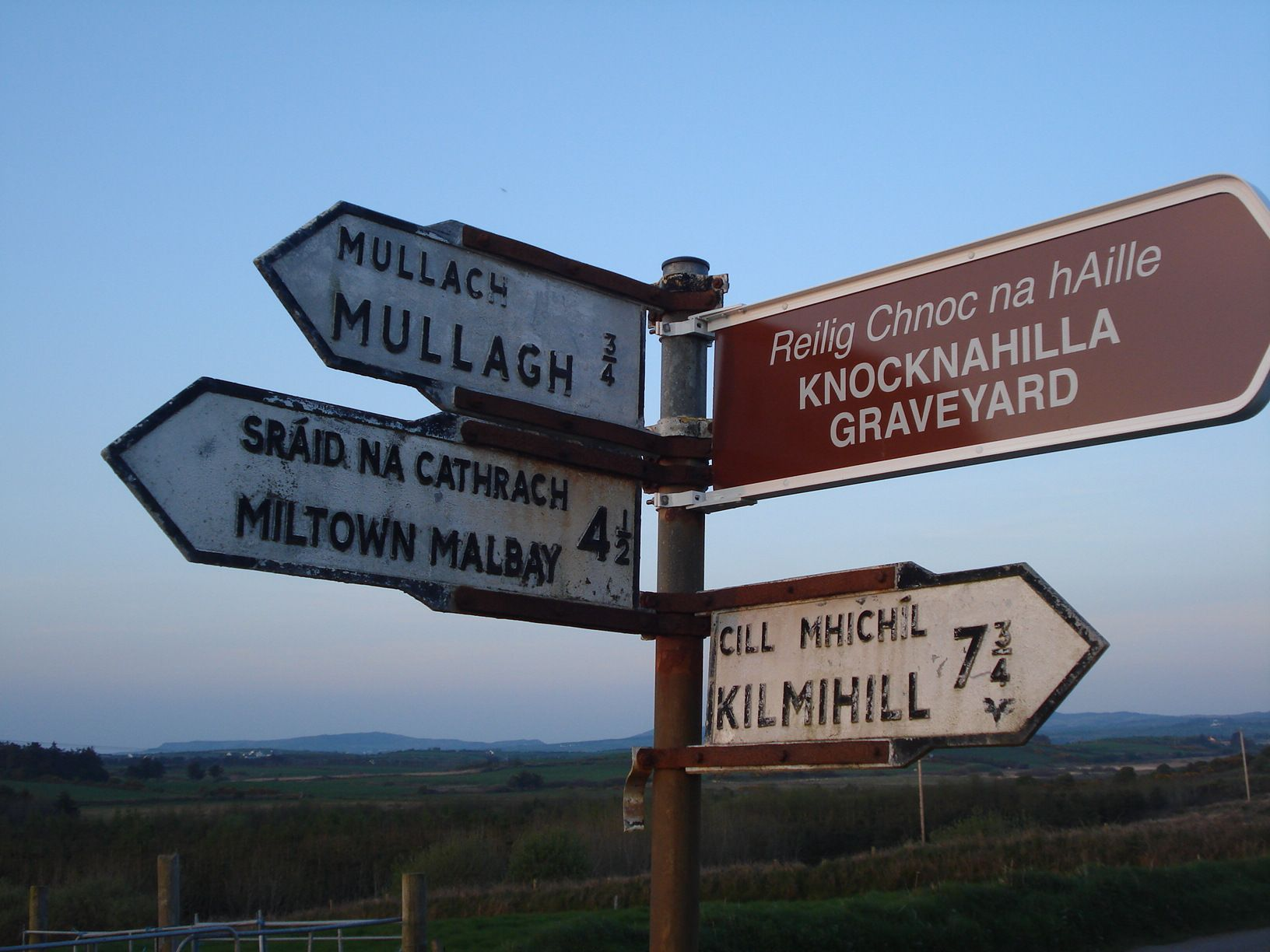
- Old style road signs near Mullagh (Ireland)

- Location in Ireland
- Coordinates: 52°48′00″N 9°24′50″W
- Country: Ireland
- Province: Munster
- County: County Clare
- Elevation: 60 m (200 ft)
- Time zone: UTC+0 (WET)
  - Summer (DST): UTC-1 (IST (WEST))
- Irish Grid Reference: R048729

Mullagh (Irish: Mullach, meaning 'hilltop') is a village in County Clare, Ireland. It lies not far from the Atlantic coast, some 5 km southeast of Quilty and 6.5 km south-southeast of Spanish Point. Nearby towns include Milltown Malbay (7 km to the north) and Kilrush (22 km to the south).

== Parish ==
The village of Mullagh is the centre of the parish of Kilmurry Ibrickane in the Roman Catholic Diocese of Killaloe. The local church is named St. Mary's.

== Amenities ==
Mullagh National School, located at the top of Mullagh Hill, has undergone much enlargement and many changes over the years, its latest extension having been officially opened on 23 June 2008. It also has a takeaway, three pubs, a community hall, a sports field and track, one shop and a church with a cemetery.

== Sport ==
The local Gaelic football team is Kilmurry Ibrickane GAA, playing in Quilty, but with their training complex in Mullagh. The club were winners of the Munster football final in 2004 and 2009 and of the county final in 2008 and 2009, 2004, 2002, 1993, 1966, 1963 and 1933.

== Notable people ==
- Thomas Kelly-Kenny - British Army general
- Marty Morrissey - RTÉ commentator and presenter
- P. J. Murrihy - singer-songwriter
- Odhran O'Dwyer - International rules football player

== See also ==
- List of towns and villages in Ireland
