= Kilmurry Ibrickane =

Kilmurry Ibrickane can refer to

- Kilmurry Ibrickane (Catholic parish)
- Kilmurry Ibrickane (civil parish)
- Kilmurry Ibrickane GAA
