= Marty Morrissey =

Irish commentator

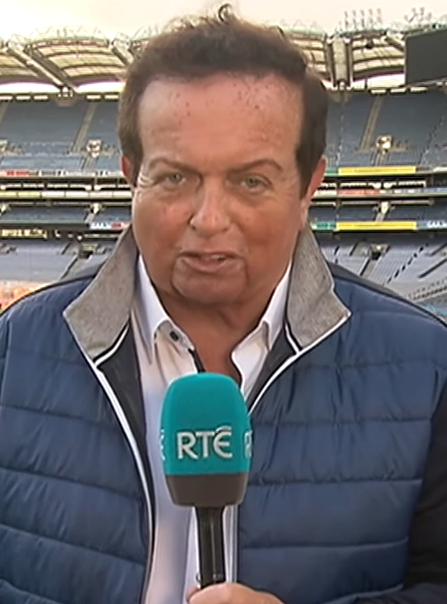
- Morrissey in 2019
- Born: 28 October 1958 (age 67); Mallow, County Cork, Ireland
- Education: University College Cork (UCC)
- Occupation: Commentator
- Employer: RTÉ

Martin Morrissey (born 28 October 1958) is an Irish sports commentator and television presenter. He is the Gaelic games correspondent for RTÉ News and regularly presents high-profile sports events for RTÉ Sport, such as the All-Ireland Senior Hurling Championship and Olympic Games.

== Early life ==
Morrissey was born in Mallow, County Cork (where his mother was from), and spent his early childhood in the Bronx, New York, where his parents worked. When he was 10 years old, the family returned to Ireland to his father's native home of County Clare. They settled in Mullagh. Morrissey went on to study at St Flannan's College in Ennis, and then University College Cork (UCC) in Cork, where he studied medicine for three years before switching to microbiology and physics. He then did a master's in education at NUI Galway to become a teacher.

While still a student in UCC, he had coached teams of the Kilmurry Ibrickane club to Clare under-16 and minor football titles. This took the attention of Sr Cecilia, principal of St Joseph's Secondary School, who needed a coach for their boys football team. Morrissey agreed, and made his entry at the school. He took charge of the senior football team in a period when the relationship between the neighbouring clubs of Kilmurry Ibrickane and Milltown Malbay was at an all-time low and their rivalry at an all-time high. By forming a school team consisting of players out of the parishes Kilmurry Ibrickane, Milltown Malbay, Doonbeg and Cree–Cooraclare, Morrissey defused most of the tensions. He managed the team to the Munster title in 1983.

Due to his involvement in the team, Morrissey was asked to teach PE for a month. It turned into a four-year stint, in which he taught, amongst others, Mathematics, Geography, Commerce and Religion.

== Sports ==
Morrisey was a dual player, playing as goalkeeper in Gaelic football and corner forward in hurling. He played his hurling with the Ballyea club, and, later, the Clonbony club. Morrisey played his football with Kilmurry Ibrickane GAA, St Flannan's College (runner up in the 1976 Munster Final), University College Cork and Clare GAA. With Clare GAA he played three years in the minor team and acted as substitute in the senior team. He played both codes at minor level for Clare.

== Broadcasting career ==
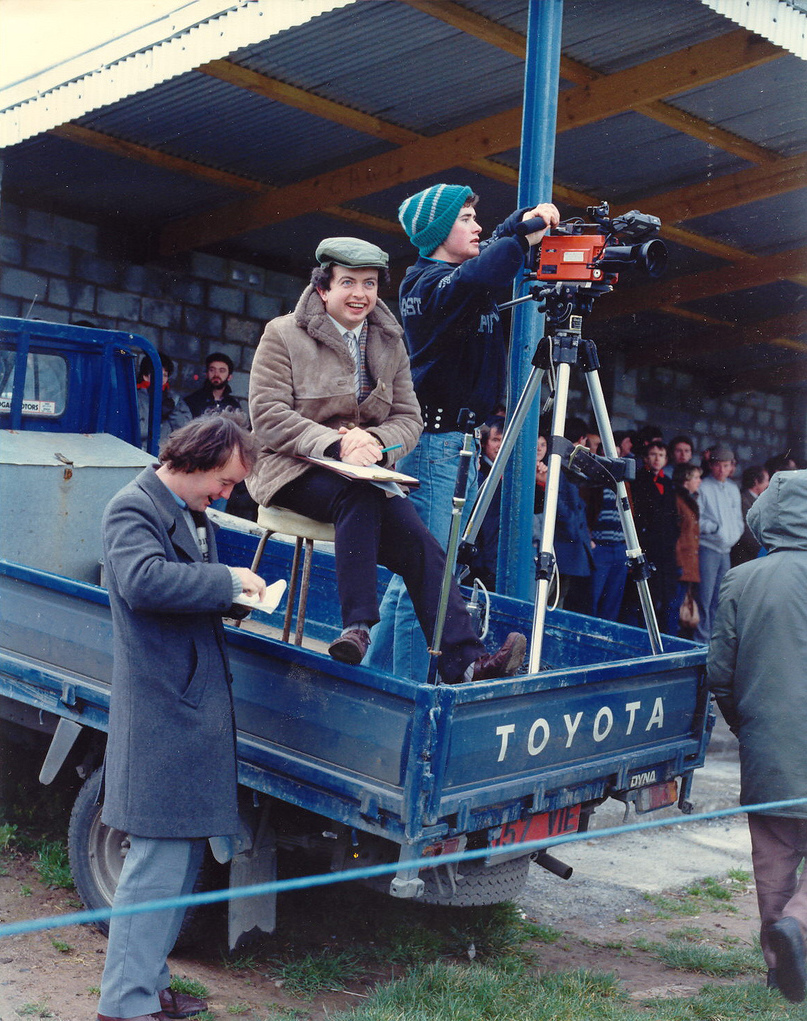
Marty Morrissey and Pascal Brooks cover a match

Morrissey entered the world of broadcasting in 1988 on joining the (since defunct) local TV channel "Cork Multi-Channel". Shortly after that, he moved to London to work for WH Smith's Lifestyle Channel. In 1989, he joined the new Clare FM local radio station as News Editor. In 1990, he returned to Cork to work on RTÉ's (also since defunct) local radio service in Cork. He left Cork in 1994, to join RTÉ's TV Sports Department.

Morrissey has commentated on many sporting events, but his bailiwick is Gaelic games. He presents Saturday Sport on RTÉ Radio 1. He was a ring announcer and interviewer on Pro Box Live. His catchphrase is "Are you ready to rock".

In May 2011, he started presenting new RTÉ2 sports programme The Committee Room for the summer championship season. This was replaced with Championship Matters for the following summer season. In 2013, Morrissey became the Gaelic games correspondent for RTÉ News.

In December 2022, in pre-recorded sequences, he played the Magic Mirror in Panto.ie's production of Snow White.

In July 2023, amid the RTÉ secret payment scandal, Morrissey apologised for an "error of judgement" after he revealed himself as the RTÉ staff member who had a loan of a car from Renault for five years.

== Presenting style ==
Morrissey has gained some notoriety for his colloquial turns of phrase while commentating on sports events, such as "the far over side of the pitch" and "leaving the ball into the square".

While in Beijing for the 2008 Summer Olympics, he came across supermodel Cindy Crawford and, in his own words, "took off with speed in pursuit of one of the most beautiful women in the world. I shouted as you do in these situations, 'Marty Morrissey RTÉ Sport Ireland'. (You just got to mention the Irish angle every time over here) 'What do you think of the Olympics?' She smiled but before the poor girl could answer she was whisked away by an army of bodyguards." He recounted his brief interview with Crawford on an RTÉ blog.

While in London for the 2012 Summer Olympics, his colourful commentary on the women's beach volleyball drew attention of journalist Pat Stacey as he "gurgled and burbled away over close-up shots of shapely bums in tiny bikini bottoms".

Morrissey was named as the Clare Person of The Year in 2014.

== Personal life ==
Morrissey's father died in December 2004. Morrissey mentioned his closeness to his mother, Peggy (née Twomey), in public. He is an only child. Peggy Morrissey died in a road traffic collision at Annagh near Milltown Malbay, in December 2021.

Morrissey has been in a relationship with his girlfriend since 1995.
