= Wesley Daly =

Wesley Daly was an Anglican priest in Ireland during the 20th-century.

Daly was educated at Trinity College, Dublin and ordained in 1910. He served at Roscrea (Curate); Kilfarboy (Curate in charge); Templeharry (Rector); Lorrha (Incumbent); Birr (Incumbent); and Killaloe Cathedral (Prebendary of Iniscattery). He was Archdeacon of Killaloe from 1938 to 1954.
