= Ibrickane =

Barony of County Clare, Ireland

- Location within Ireland
- Coordinates: 52.850889°N 9.402607°W
- Country: Ireland
- Province: Munster
- County: Clare

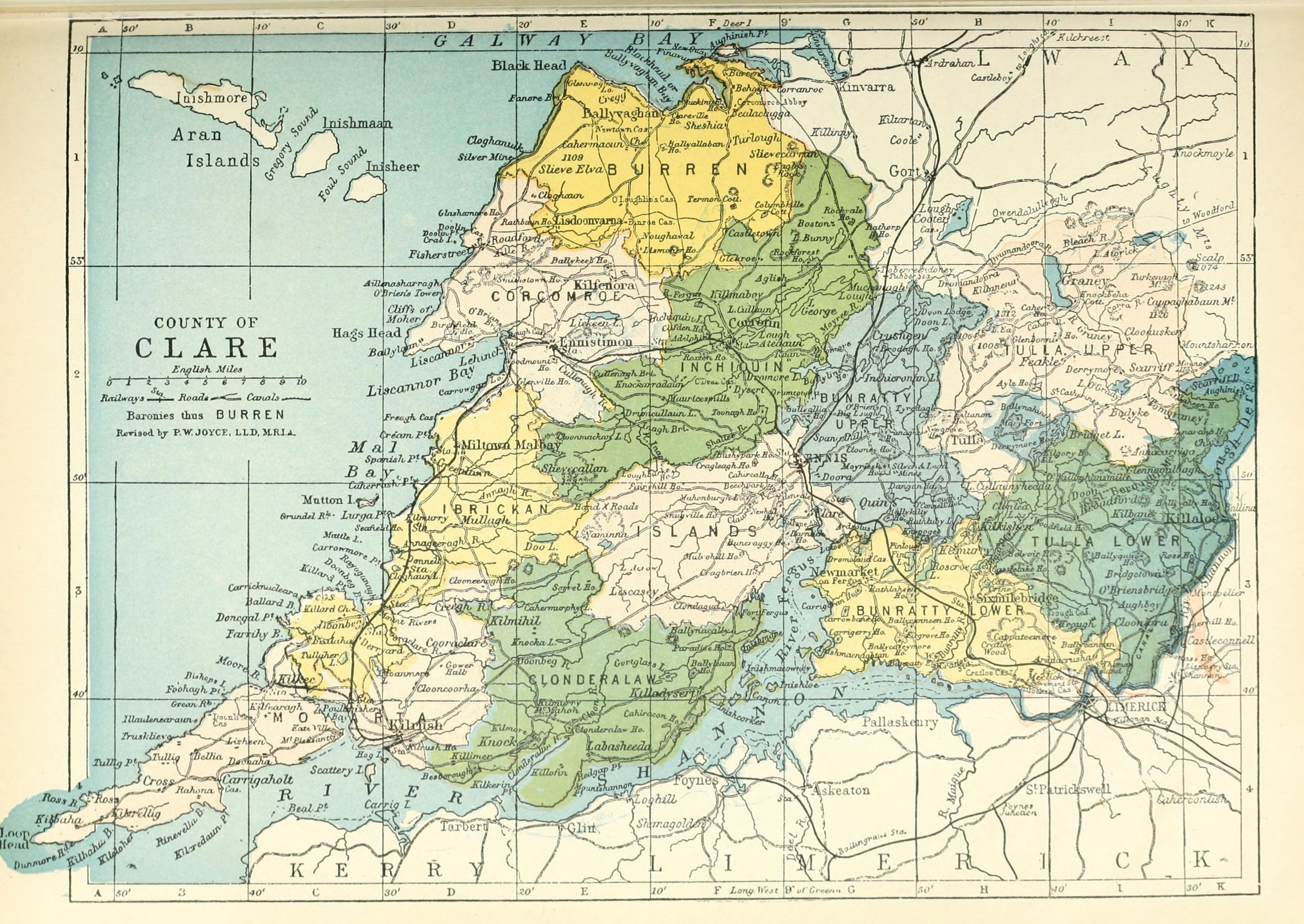
Baronies of Clare. Ibrickane in the centre left.

Ibrickane (or Ibrickan) is one of the ancient baronies of Ireland. It is a geographical division of County Clare. It is sub-divided into four civil parishes.

== Legal context ==
Baronies were created after the Norman invasion of Ireland as divisions of counties and were used for the administration of justice and the raising of revenue. While baronies continue to be officially defined units, they have been administratively obsolete since 1898. However, they continue to be used in land registration and in specification, such as in planning permissions. In many cases, a barony corresponds to an earlier Gaelic túath which had submitted to the Crown.

== Location ==
The barony of Ibrickane extends along the Atlantic coast of County Clare. It is bounded by the baronies of Corcomroe (to the north), Inchiquin (to the north-east), Islands (to the east), Clonderalaw (to the south-east) and by Moyarta (to the south-west). It has an area of 57,028 acres (23,078 ha) of which 598 acres (242 ha) are water. The southern part is boggy, while the northern part holds farmland and moorish uplands.

== Parishes and settlements ==
The barony contains the civil parishes of Kilfarboy, Killard and Kilmurry and part of the parish of Kilmacduane. The main settlements are Milltown Malbay, Doonbeg, Kilmurry and Mullagh.
