= Murrihy =

Irish surname associated with notable singers

Murrihy is a surname. Notable people with the surname include:

- P. J. Murrihy, Irish singer-songwriter
- Paula Murrihy, Irish operatic mezzo-soprano
