= Kilmurry Ibrickane (Catholic parish) =

Parish in County Clare, Ireland

Coordinates: 52°47′55.06″N 9°25′58.84″W

Kilmurry Ibrickane Mullagh (Kilmurry Ibrickane)
- Roman Catholic parish
- Location in Ireland
- Country: Ireland
- Province: Munster
- County: County Clare

Government
  - Dáil Éireann: Clare

Area
  - Total: 34.32 km^{2} (13.25 sq mi)
- Time zone: UTC+0 (WET)
  - Summer (DST): UTC-1 (IST (WEST))

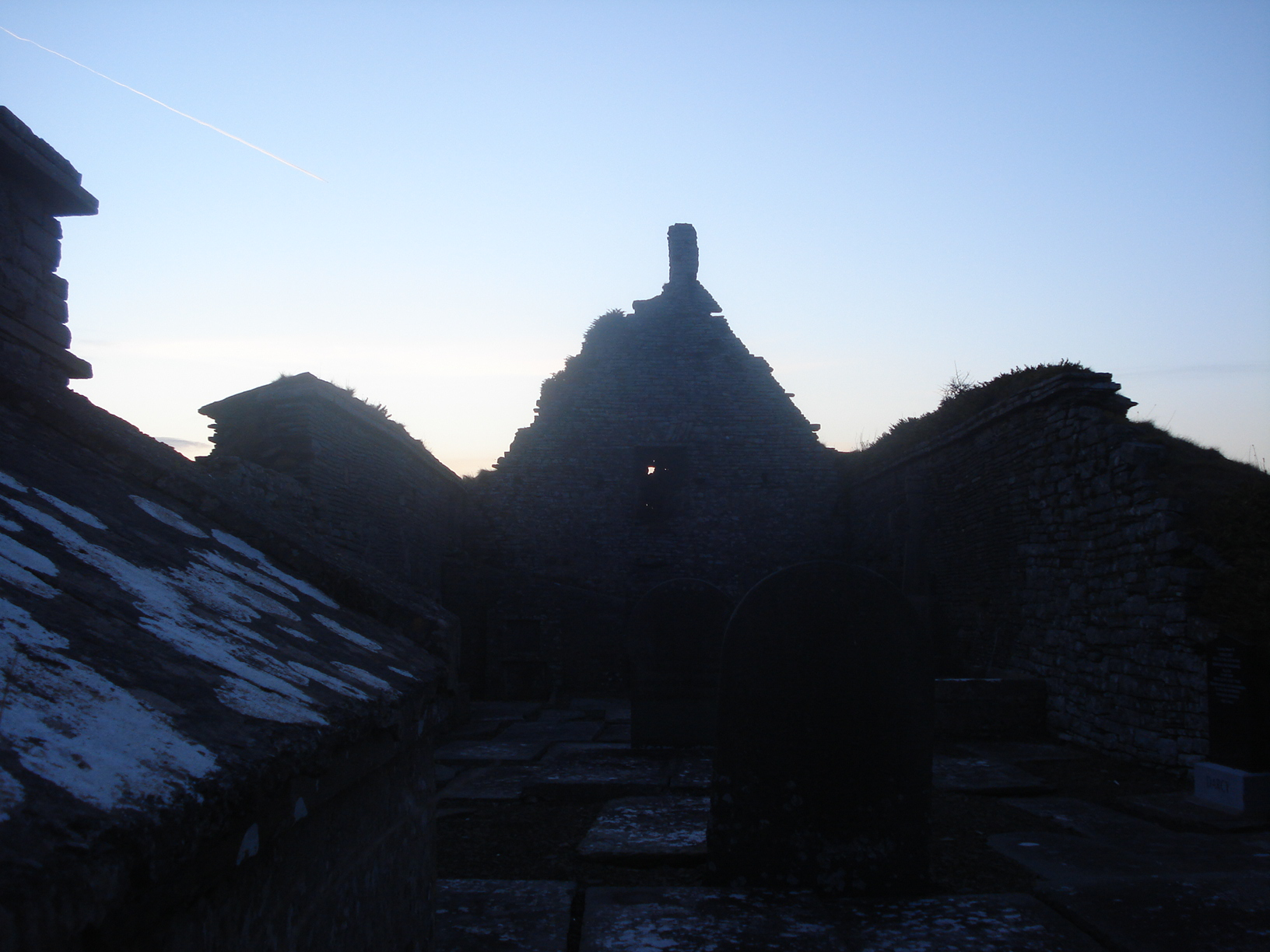
Ruins of the oldest church of the parish Kilmurry Ibrickane

Kilmurry Ibrickane (Irish: Cill Mhuire Uí Bhreacáin), also known as Mullagh (Kilmurry Ibrickane), is a parish of the Roman Catholic Diocese of Killaloe that is located in west County Clare, Ireland. A civil parish of the same name also exists which is part of the historic barony of Ibrickane. The parish derives its name from the tiny settlement of Kilmurry in Ibrickane, the location of the church before Cromwellian times.

The main settlements in the parish are Mullagh, Coore and Quilty. The GAA club, Kilmurry Ibrickane GAA, is centred on the parish.

== History ==
It is unknown when the parish came into existence. For a long period it was ministered together with the parish of Kilfarboy (Milltown Malbay). The "Register of Priests" in 1704 mentioned Fr. Teige and Fr. Francis Shannon as priests in respectively Kilfarboy and Kilmurry Ibrickane, but according to Ó Murchadha, there is little doubt that they in fact acted as priest and curate for both parishes.

In the 1830s, the population of the combined parishes had risen to about 20,000 people, so a split became necessary. The priest and his curate, the brothers Anthony and Patrick McGuane, built two identical church buildings in Milltown Malbay and Mullagh. The Night of the Big Wind prevented completion of the church in Mullagh. The planned tower and spire were never built. When Fr. Anthony McGuane died in 1839, his brother Fr. Patrick became the first parish priest of Kilfarboy. Their cousin, Fr. Edmund Barry, became the first parish priest of Kilmurry Ibrickane.

Fr. Thomas Moloney, then curate at Kilmurry Ibrickane, was a supporter of the Young Ireland movement. During the Great Famine he worked tirelessly to get the word out of the disaster happening in Ireland, through newspapers and political contacts.

== Parishes ==
In 1837, there were also a Church of Ireland parish and a civil parish of the same name.

Under the Civil Registration Act 2004, the records kept by the parish about baptisms, marriages and deaths, are official records. This makes the parish part of the Civil Registration Service.

== Churches ==
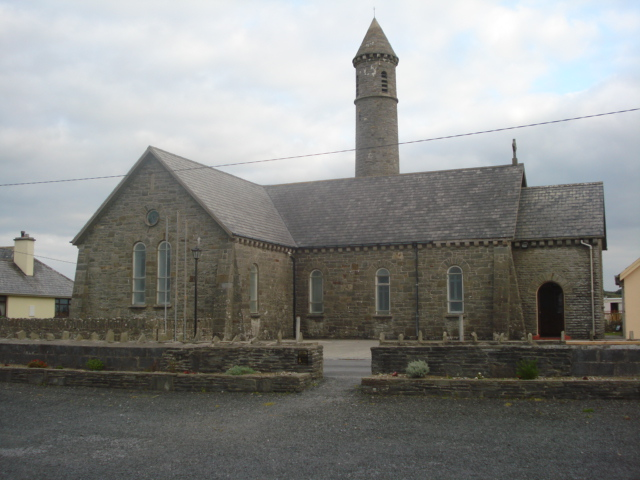
Our Lady Star of the Sea Church, Quilty

- St. Mary's Church, Mullagh. Built 1839.
- The Most Holy Redeemer, Coore. Built 1865-1866.
- Our Lady Star of the Sea, Quilty. Built 1909, in the aftermath of the rescue of the seamen from the French freighter Leon XIII.

== List of parish priests ==
- Edmund Barry (1839-1860)
- Patrick Moran (1860-1875)
- James Cahir (1876-1914)
- John Glynn (1914-1930)
- Patrick Scanlon (1930-1932)
- Patrick J. O'Halloran (1932-1947)
- Peter Ryan (1948-1961)
- Jeremiah Cahir (1961-1966)
- Henry Kenny (1966-1969)
- John Greed (1969-1972)
- Thomas Murphy (1972-1980)
- Michael Green (1981-1986)
- Timothy Tuohy (1986-2001)
- Patrick Larkin (2002–2013)
- Anthony McMahon (2013-2018)
- Donagh O’Meara (2018- )
