= Nora Cleary =

Irish singer (1924–1988)

Nora Cleary (1924–1988) was a well known Irish traditional singer and lilter from the hamlet known as The Hand, near Milltown Malbay, County Clare, Ireland.

Nora Cleary was the second youngest child of Daniel and Catherina Cleary. With the exception of short periods in Clounlaheen and Manchester, she lived her whole life in The Hand. Her parents were already interested in music and encouraged her to sing. She received further support from her teachers at Shanaway National School. At a relatively young age, she started singing in McCarthy's pub – still extant – in Clounlaheen, something she kept doing all her life. She died after a short illness.

== Discography ==
Recordings of Nora Cleary are issued on several albums:

- The Lambs on the Green Hills, Songs of County Clare; 1978, Topic Records
- Voice of the People, Vol. 6: O'Er His Grave the Grass Grew Green; 1999, Topic Records
- Voice of the People, Vol. 7: First I'm Going to Sing You a Ditty; 1999, Topic Records
- We've Received Orders to Sail; 1999, Topic Records
- Around the Hills of Clare; 2004, Musical Traditions Records Singing and lilting.
