= Atlantic Hotel (Spanish Point, Ireland) =

Coordinates: 52°50′41.28″N 9°26′13.39″W

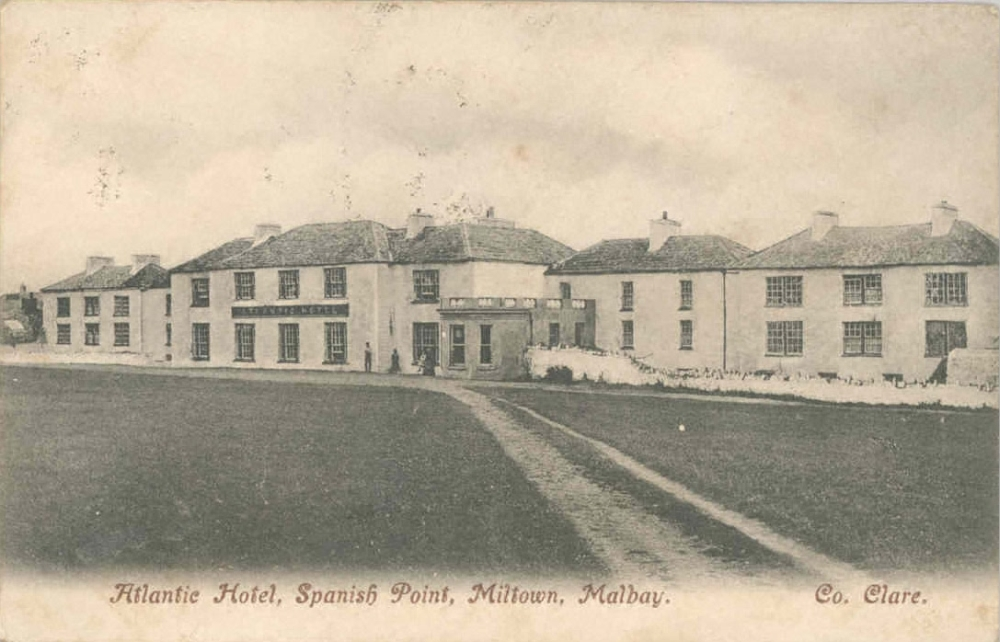
Atlantic Hotel (from a postcard held by the Limerick Museum)

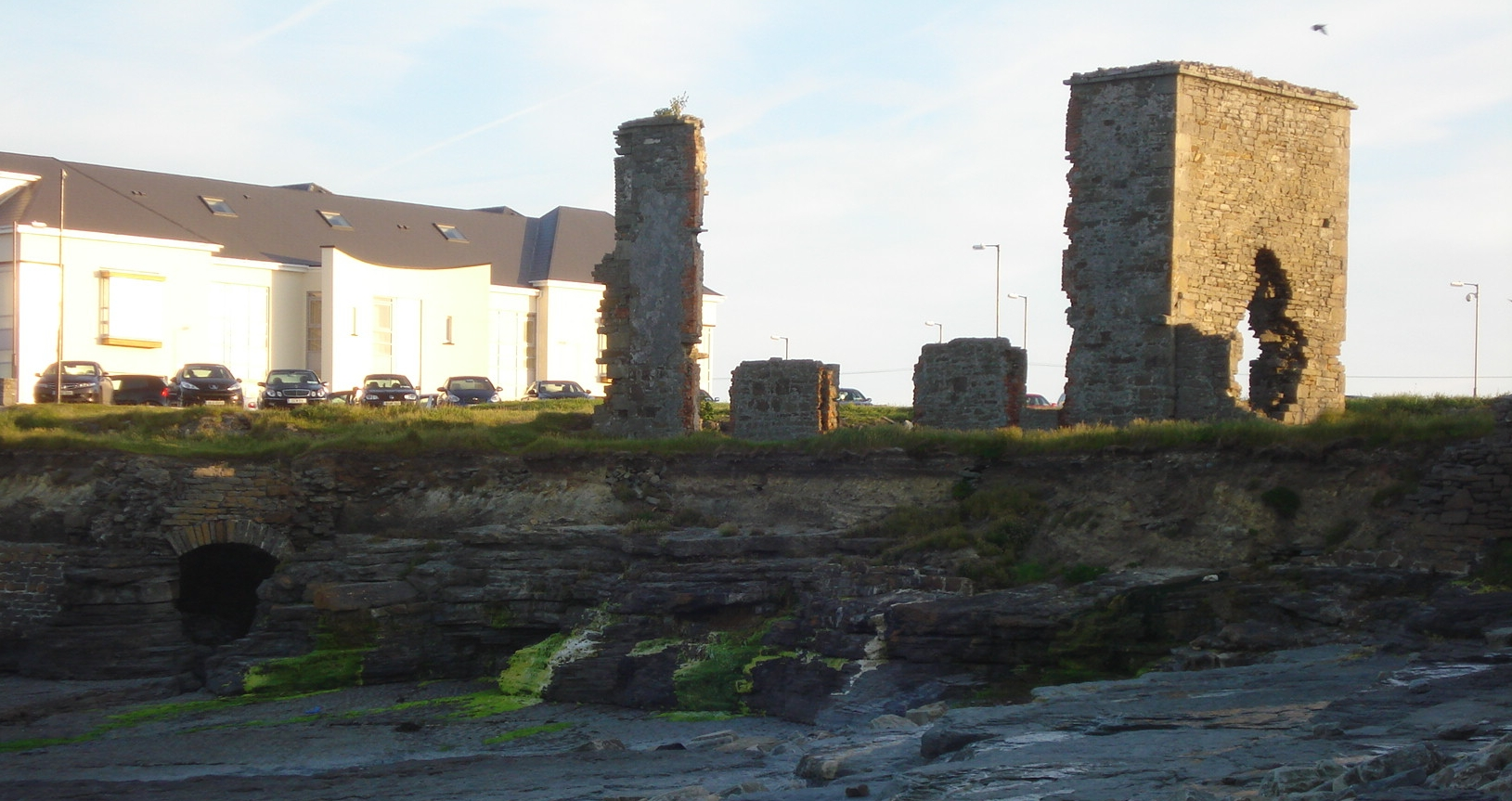
Remaining ruins of the Atlantic Hotel from the seaside. In the background is the Armada Hotel.

The Atlantic Hotel was a hotel in Spanish Point, County Clare, Ireland. It was built around 1810 by Thomas Moroney, a member of the family of local landlords. For several years it was described as the "largest hotel in the British Isles". The hotel closed in the 1930s and, with the exception of one section which continued to operate for a period as a licensed premises, was demolished in the 1940s. A new hotel, the Armada Hotel, was later built on the site.

== History ==
The hotel was originally built in the early 19th century. By c. 1845, Thomas Moroney had extended the hotel to sixty rooms with hot and cold baths and "spacious halls". The quietness and luxury made it a popular destination for Irish and English gentry.

=== Auxiliary workhouse ===
In 1838, the British Government passed the Irish Poor Laws, and Spanish Point fell under the Poor Law Union of Ennistymon. This Poor Law Union set up a workhouse between Ennistymon and Lahinch. During the Great Famine, this workhouse became overwhelmed and the Poor Law Union leased several other big buildings to serve as auxiliary workhouses. Among these was the Atlantic Hotel, which housed 500 women and children from September 1848.

=== 1890s ===
By 1893, the hotel was owned by Mrs. E.L. Moroney. A nine-hole golf course was established at Spanish Point in the mid-1890s. As of 1897, guests of the hotel could play at this course for free, while others had to pay a green fee of 2 shillings 6 pence.

=== Medal ceremony ===
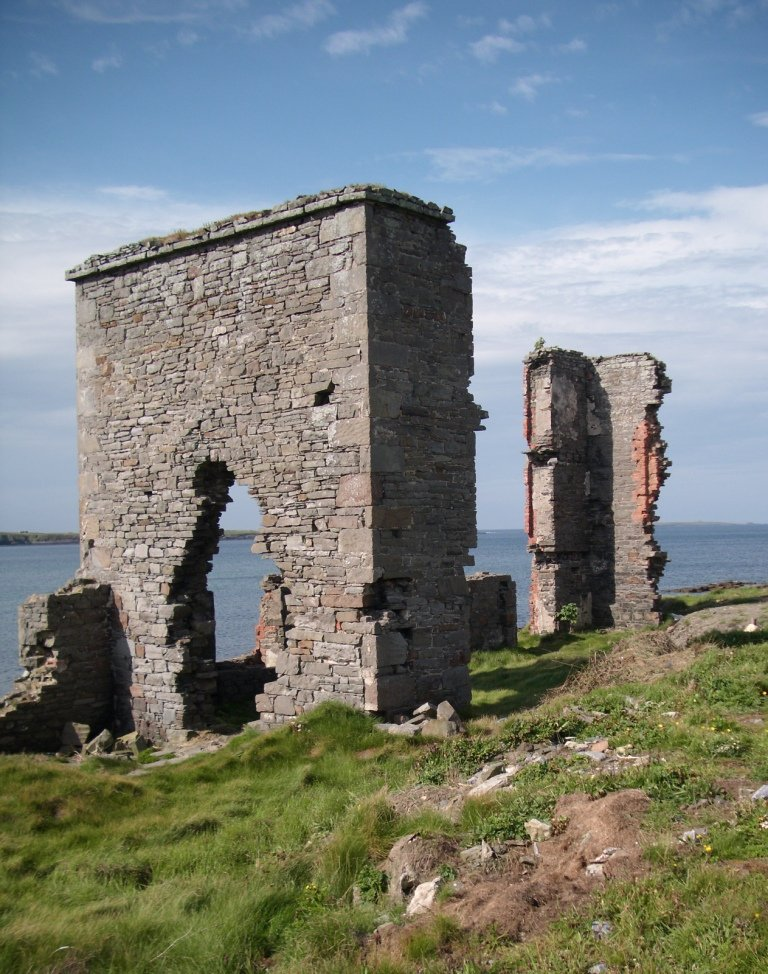
Ruins of the Atlantic Hotel

The hotel was tangentially involved in the story of the 1907 rescue of the French three-masted ship Leon XIII. During a severe storm in October 1907, the vessel ran aground near Quilty, County Clare. Despite the heavy seas, several fishermen from Quilty manned their currachs and, over three days, saved most of the French crew members. At an event in the Atlantic Hotel, the French Government presented the rescuers with medals.

=== Closure and demolition ===
By the 1930s, the hotel had permanently closed. It had previously depended on business from the English gentry, and they did not travel to Spanish Point after the Irish War of Independence and the Civil War. The building was still mentioned in the 1942 ITA Survey, but not as a hotel.

After the closure of the hotel, the site eventually became derelict, and the hotel was largely demolished in the 1940s. As of the 21st century, only some ruined remains are visible.

== Armada Hotel ==
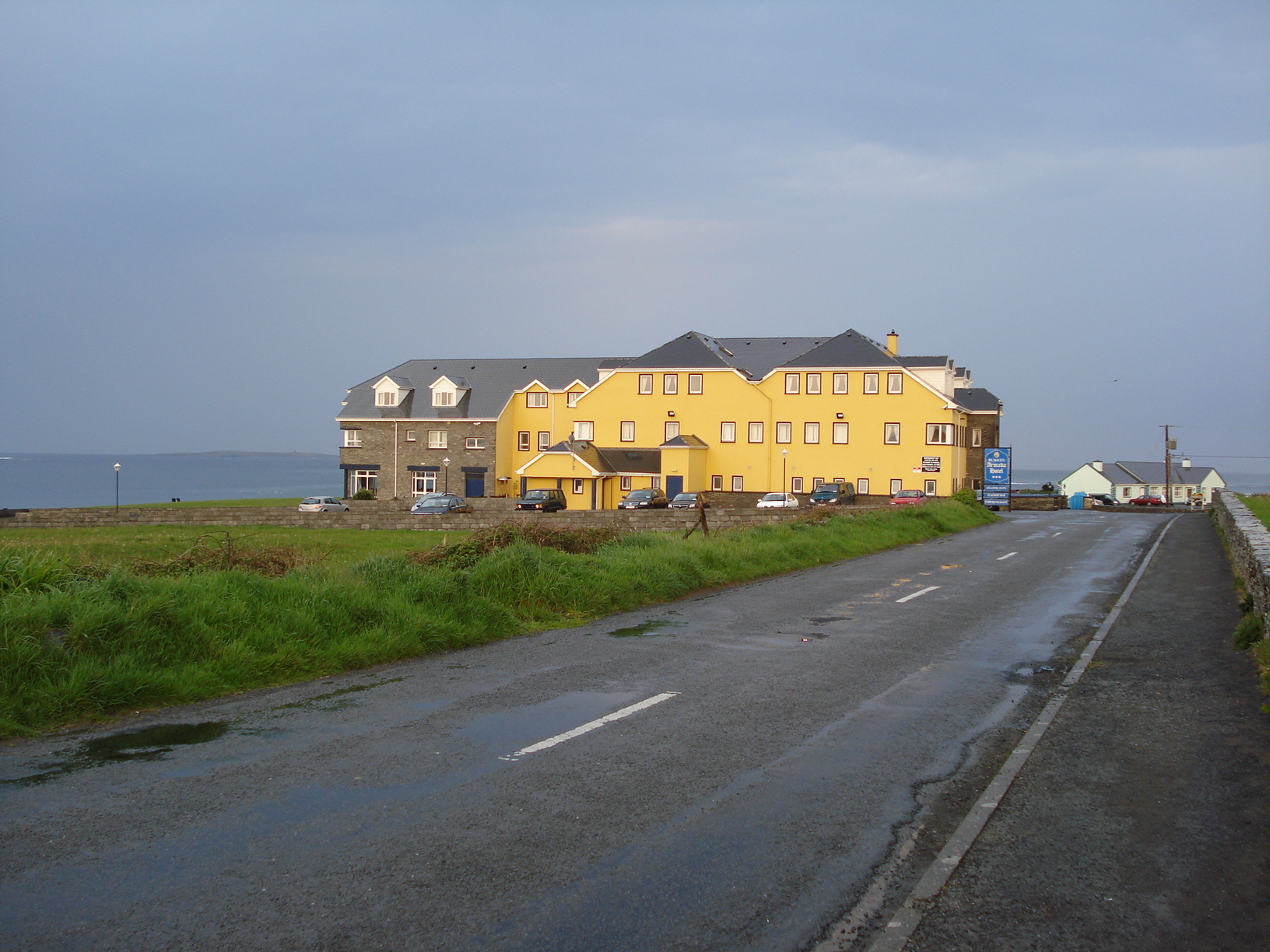
A new building, the Armada Hotel, was built on the site in the 1970s

In the 1970s a new hotel, the 85-room Armada Hotel, was built on the site at Spanish Point.
