= Seán Óg =

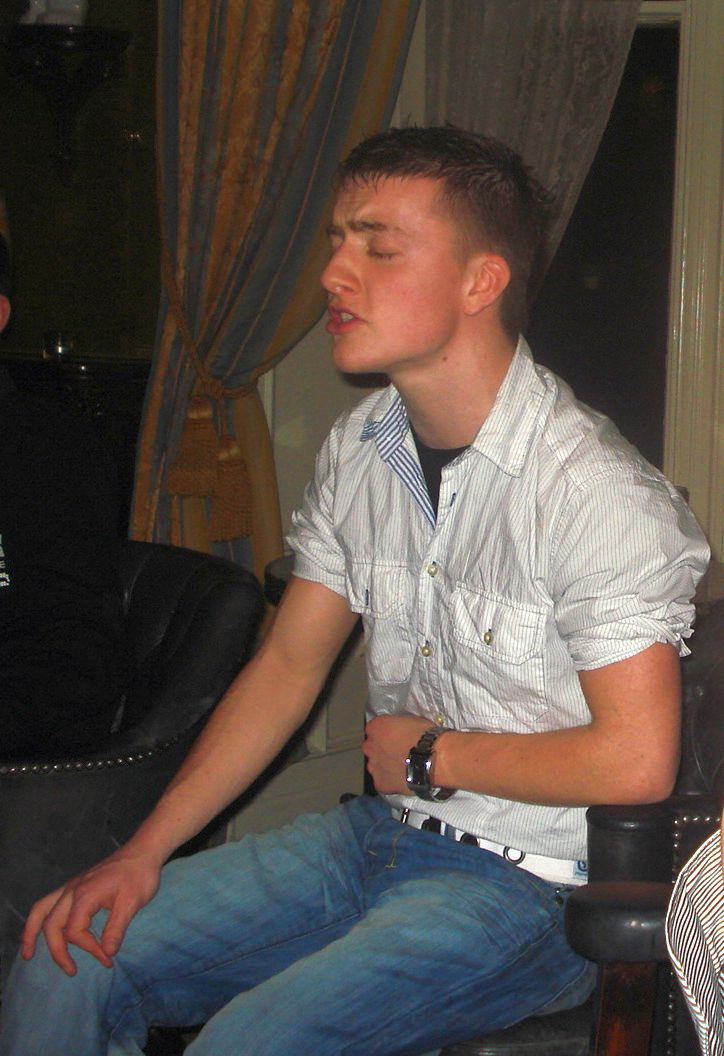
- Seán Óg, 2010

Background information
- Also known as: Seán Óg
- Born: Sean O'Malley; 4 June 1992 (age 34)
- Origin: Milltown Malbay, County Clare, Ireland
- Genres: pop, rap
- Occupations: Musician, singer, student
- Instruments: Vocals, guitar
- Years active: 2010–present
- Website: seanog.com

Sean O'Malley (born 4 June 1992), most commonly known by his stage name Seán Óg ("Seán junior" or "Young Seán"), is a singer and musician from Milltown Malbay, County Clare, Ireland.

Born into a family of musicians, he started making music on a young age. Like many teenagers he made a combination between studying for his leaving cert and playing in a band.

In 2010 he scored a hit single with "We still love you without your car". The accompanying clip on YouTube was remarkable, due to several dogs playing the instruments.

== Singles ==
Song	Year	Irish Charts
We still love you without your car	2010	No. 19
The Answer	2010	No. 14
Promises We Hold	2010	No. 16
They're the Reasons	2011	–
Dreaming	2012	No. 22
You are so true	2012	No. 22
I Know	2013	No. 14
