= Máire Ní Shúilleabháin =

Irish language teacher and activist

- Born: 2 February 1884; Milltown Malbay
- Died: 14 July 1914 (aged 30); Brisbane, Australia
- Other names: Mary Sullivan, Mary O'Sullivan
- Occupation: teacher

Máire Ní Shúilleabháin (2 February 1884 – 14 July 1914), was an Irish language teacher and activist.

== Biography ==
Máire Ní Shúilleabháin was born Mary Sullivan on 2 February 1884 in Miltown Malbay in County Clare. Her mother was Winifred Marrinan and her father, John Sullivan was a shopkeeper. Ní Shúilleabháin attended school in Galway and College in Dublin. She completed a Bachelor of Arts in Irish. Ní Shúilleabháin was the only woman Irish language teacher appointed under the National Education Board in 1907. She was involved in the new movement of language nationalism and was involved in Conradh na Gaeilge. Ní Shúilleabháin was keen to have Irish taught as a subject in the schools. She spent four years working for the Board before her health failed. Ní Shúilleabháin then went to Brisbane, Australia, where she continued to teach Irish to the children of Irish immigrants. She worked there as an inspector of Irish in Brisbane primary schools. She died on 14 July 1914 in the Diamantina Health Care Museum and both An Claidheamh Soluis and The Clare Journal gave an account of the story.
