= Kilfarboy (Catholic parish) =

Parish in County Clare, Ireland

- Catholic parish
- Location within Ireland
- Coordinates: 52°51′17.29″N 9°24′4.99″W
- Country: Ireland
- Province: Munster
- County: County Clare
- Time zone: UTC+0 (WET)
  - Summer (DST): UTC-1 (IST (WEST))

Kilfarboy, or Milltown Malbay is a parish in County Clare, Ireland, and part of the Críocha Callan grouping of parishes within the Roman Catholic Diocese of Killaloe.

As of 2022, the co-parish priest is Donagh O'Meara.

== Churches ==
There are two churches in the parish.

The main church is the Church of St. Joseph in Milltown Malbay. It was built in 1839-1840. It was finished in 1863 when the tower and spire were added. The church replaced an older thatched chapel that was. De site was donated by the landlord Fitzgerald after the landlord Moroney, who owned the townlands of Milltown Malbay, refused a site.

The second church of the parish is the St. Mary's Chapel in Moy. This rectangular chapel was built in 1872. Just as with the church in Milltown Malbay, the site was donated by landlord Fitzgerald.

== gallery ==
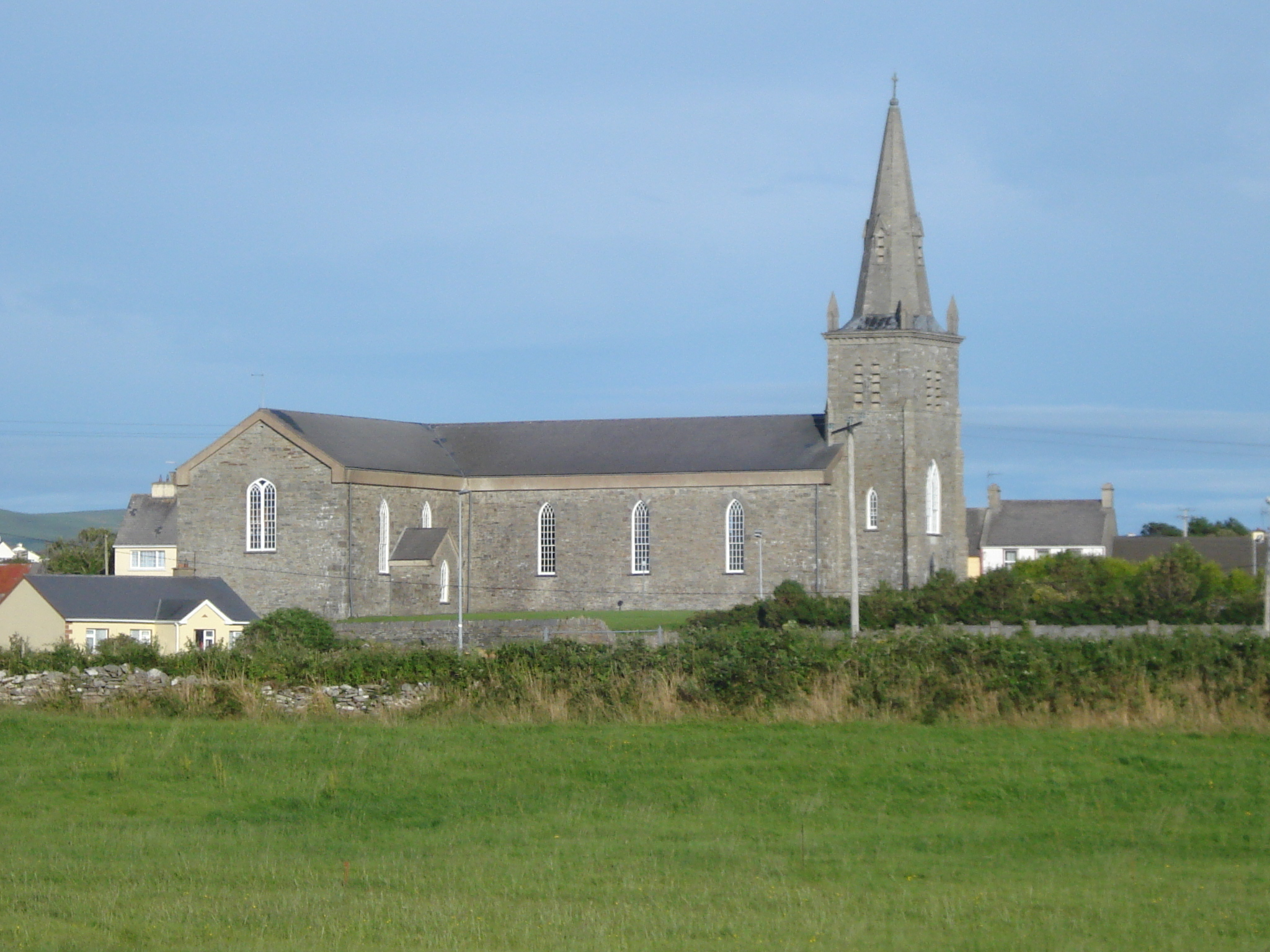
St. Joseph's Church, Milltown Malbay 2013

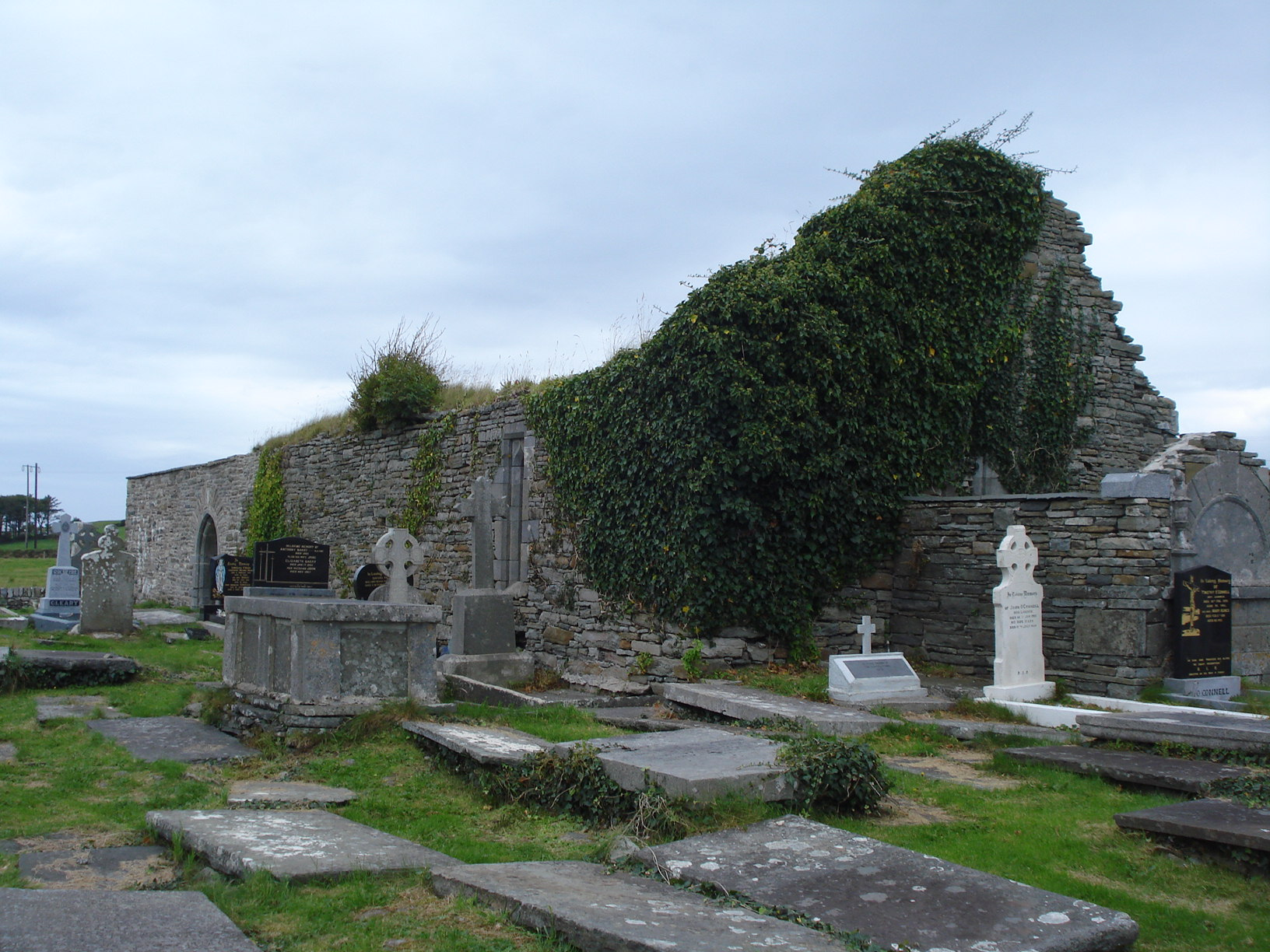
Remains of St. Laichtins Church, townland Kilfarboy

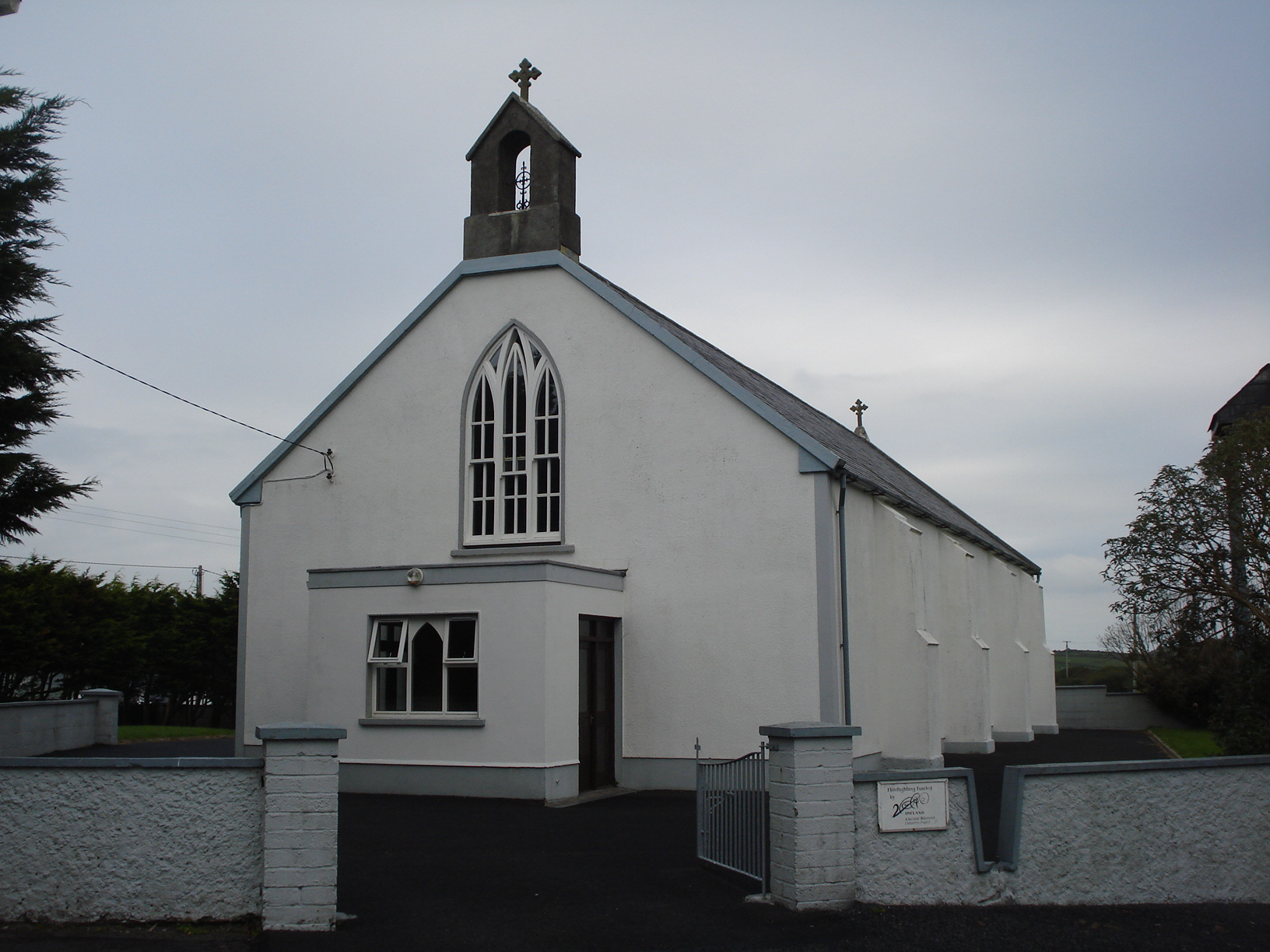
St. Mary's Chapel, Moy

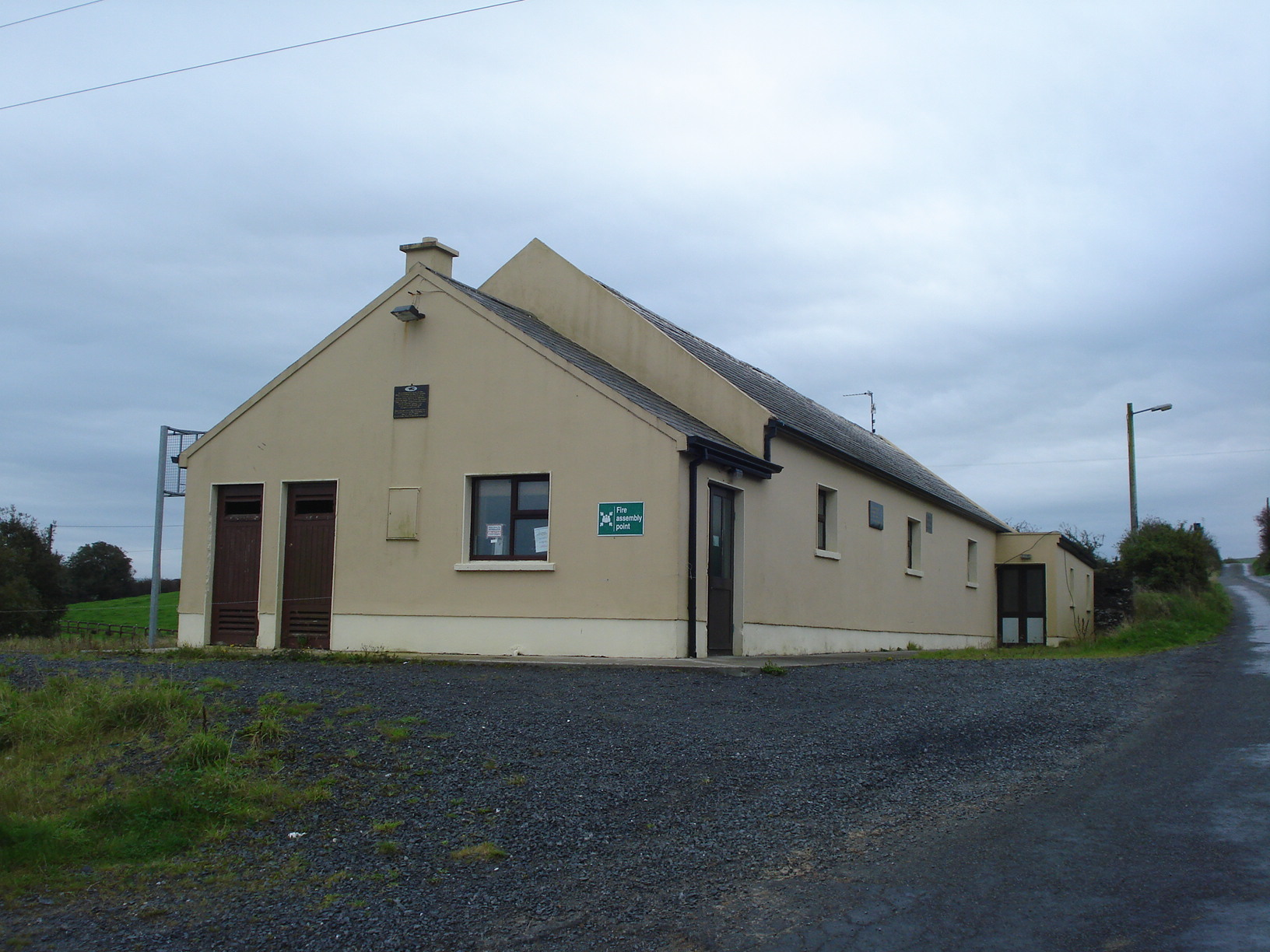
Tommy White Memorial Hall. Building started as a new church but was never finished. Later finished as a school and converted to a community centre after a new school was built.

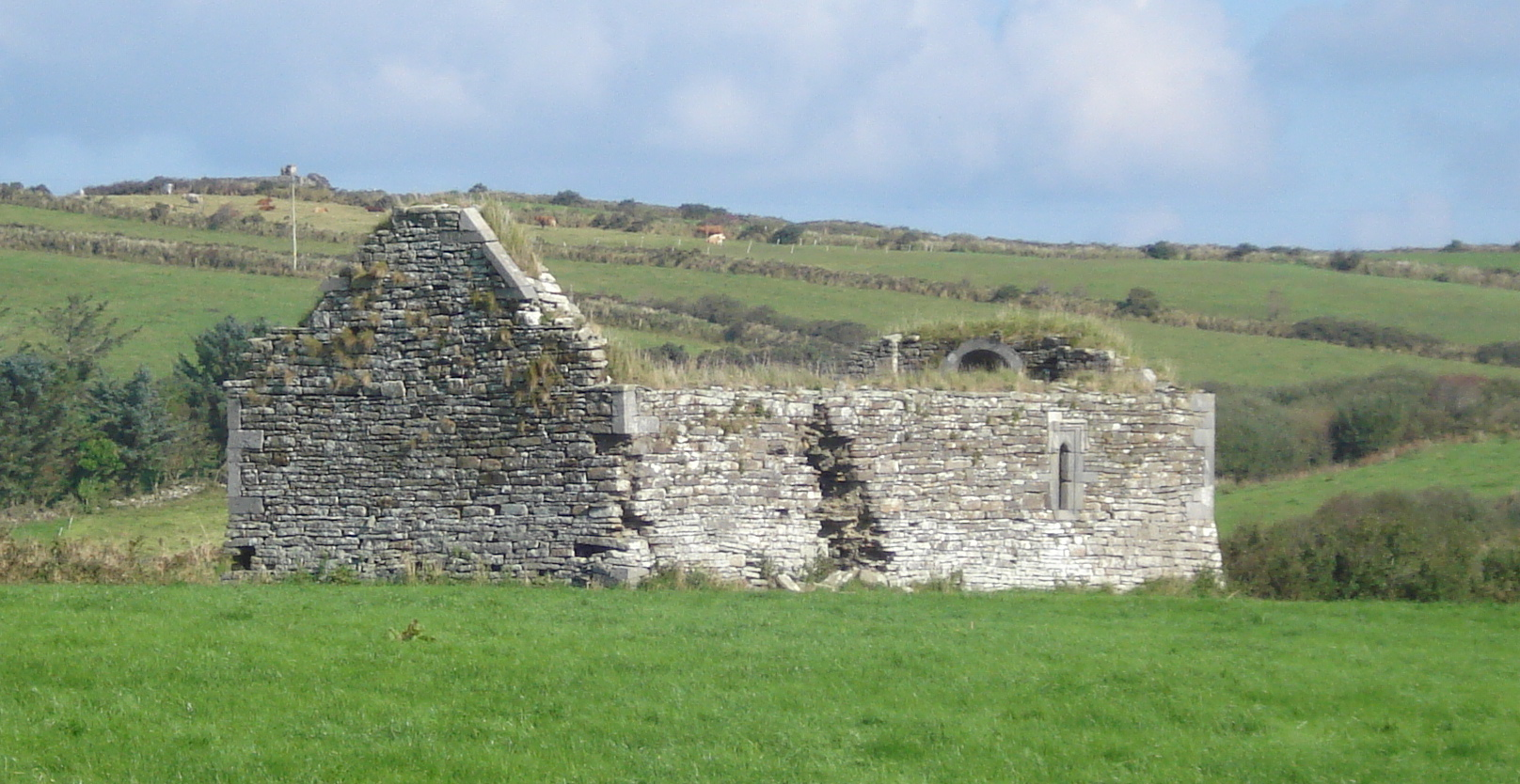
Teampall-Inis-Dia in Moy (Church of the Island of God)
