= Tom Lenihan =

Irish singer (1908–1990)

Tom Lenihan (1908–1990) was a well known Irish traditional singer from Milltown Malbay, County Clare, Ireland.

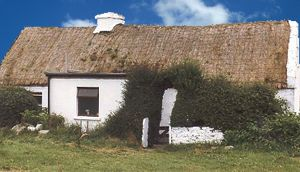
The house where Tom Lenihan has lived in Knockbrack, Milltown Malbay. Anno 2011 the house is renovated and extended.

Tom and Margaret Lenihan (born Vaughan) lived in a farmhouse in Knockbrack, a few miles outside Miltown Malbay. He was a farmer and the local butcher.

According to the sleevenotes of the CD Around the Hills of Clare:

Tom had a very large repertoire and positive ideas about singing. He insisted that the story was most important aspect; the singer's involvement with the song was paramount. To him it was vital that the singer used speech pat-terns, made sense of the words, singing them as close as possible to the way one would speak; to fit the tune to the words, not to make the words fit the tune. One can appreciate why Tom had so many narrative songs in his repertoire; his attitude to singing is illustrated on the two tracks of speech.

== Recordings ==
=== Solo albums ===
- Paddy's Panacea, 1978, Topic Records
- The Mount Callan Garland: songs from the repertoire of Tom Lenihan of Knockbrack, Miltown Malbay, county Clare. 1994. Collected and edited by Tom Munnelly with music transcriptions by Marian Deasy.Double cassette, accompanied by a book.

=== Anthologies ===
- Irish Voices, 1997, Topic
- Hurry The Jug, 1996, Globestyle
- Come All My Lads that Follow The Plough (Voice of the People Vol 5), 1998, Topic
- They Ordered Their Pints of Beer and Sherry, 1998, Topic (only one song)
- As Me and My Love Sat Courting: Songs of Love (Voice of the People Vol 15), 1998, Topic (only one song)
- Around the Hills of Clare

=== Unpublished ===
- Recordings made by Tom Munnelly about folklore. Made on behalf of the Department of Irish Folklore, University College Dublin.
