= P. J. Murrihy =

Patrick Joseph Murrihy
- Occupations: Singer; songwriter

Patrick Joseph Murrihy is an Irish singer-songwriter from Mullagh, County Clare, Ireland. When not working on his own farm in Clare (where he breeds Wagyu cattle) he tours Ireland with his own band.

As a youngster Murrihy learned songs from singers in his family, including his mother and two of his uncles. He started playing music professionally with Michael Sexton Snr (the céilí-band leader from Mullagh), Jimmy Warde and David Culligan. He played for a time with the Kilfenora Céilí Band, with whom he made two albums, and then teamed up with accordionist Seamus Shannon for twelve years. They specialized in Irish traditional and country songs and dance music. Before forming his own band he played in a band called The Bannermen.

He previously recorded with Harmac Records, which was sold to Ceol Records, Murrihy's current record label. He records in Martin O'Malley's Studios in Miltown Malbay.

One of Murrihy's most popular songs is "Pat Murphy's Meadow", which was originally a poem, written in the late 1930s by J.M. Devine. Murrihy recorded it in 1988, when it entered the Irish charts.

== Songs ==
Songs composed and recorded by P. J. Murrihy include the following:

- "The Music And County Clare"

== Discography (albums) ==
- Pat Murphy's Meadow
- Bygone Days
- The Music Man from Clare
- My Father's House
- The Land of the Gael
- Absent Friends.
- Life in the Auld Dog Yet.
- The Land of the Gael.
- I Won't Up the Ante!
- Changing Times
- Keep Me in Mind
- The Wonder of the West
- Childhood Memories

With Seamus Shannon:

- My Native Sod
- From Roscommon to Clare
