= Mutton Island =

Island in County Clare, Ireland

Native name: Oileán Caorach
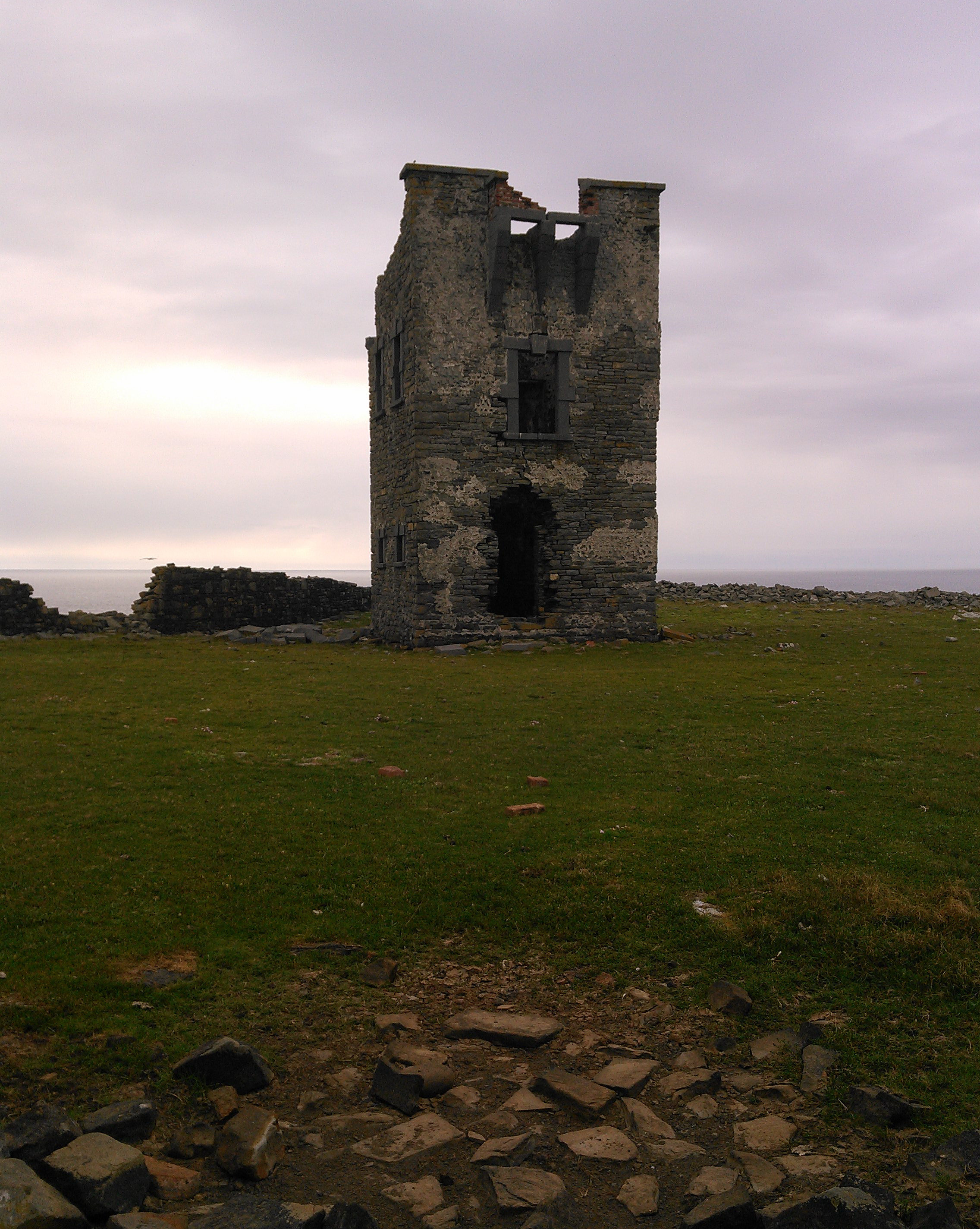
- Fort on Mutton Island

- Location within island of Ireland

Geography
- Location: Atlantic Ocean
- Coordinates: 52°48′45.11″N 9°31′26.76″W
- Area: 0.9698 km^{2} (0.3744 sq mi)

Administration
- Ireland
- Province: Munster
- County: Clare

Demographics
- Population: 0

Mutton Island (Irish: Oileán Caorach), historically 'Enniskerry' (Inis Caorach, 'sheep island'), is an uninhabited island and townland off the coast of County Clare, Ireland, about 1.5 km (0.9 mi) from the mainland. The nearest village is Quilty, which is roughly 3.5 km (2.2 mi) from the island.

It is used mainly for grazing sheep, and is host to several abandoned houses and two forts.

There is no public ferry service to the island, on which there is no jetty or boat slipway. It contains no roofed buildings, but there is a limited supply of fresh water.

== History ==
The fortifications on the island were likely built by Thomas Burgh around 1702.

The island was populated as late as the 1920s and is believed to have been part of the mainland until the year 804.

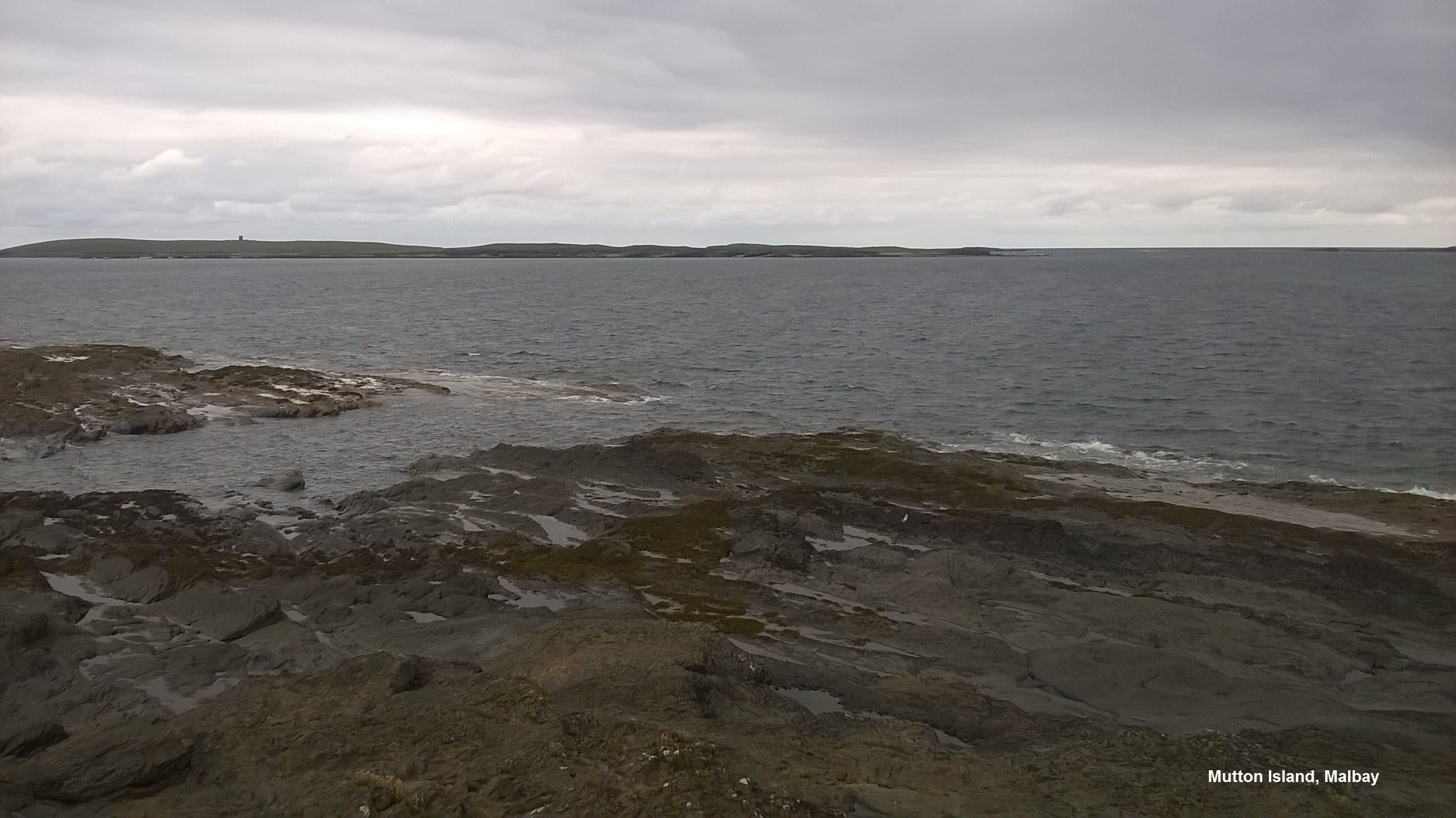
Mutton Island as seen from Seafield
