= Kilmurry Ibrickane (civil parish) =

Civil parish in County Clare, Ireland

Kilmurry Ibrickane Cill Mhuire Uí Bhreacáin
- Civil parish
- Location in Ireland
- Coordinates: 52°47′59″N 9°27′16″W
- Country: Ireland
- Province: Munster
- County: County Clare

Government
  - Dáil Éireann: Clare
- Time zone: UTC+0 (WET)
  - Summer (DST): UTC-1 (IST (WEST))

Kilmurry Ibrickane (Irish: Cill Mhuire Uí Bhreacáin) is a civil parish in County Clare, Ireland, The parish is part of the historic barony of Ibrickane. In 1837, it was co-extensive with the parish of the Established Church and of the Catholic Church. The civil parish contains the tiny settlement of Kilmurry which was the location of the church before the Cromwellian conquest of Ireland. Today, an ecclesiastical parish in the Roman Catholic Diocese of Killaloe of the same name exists which covers part of the civil parish. In the Church of Ireland, the parish is part of the "Drumcliffe Union with Kilnasoolagh" which covers the western part of the county of Clare, roughly that part located to the west of the M18 motorway.

== Townlands ==
The civil parish is divided into 52 townlands:

- Annagh
- Ballymackea Beg
- Ballymackea More
- Caherrush
- Carrowduff
- Carrowlagan
- Carrownagry North
- Carrownagry South
- Cloghauninchy
- Cloghaunnatinny
- Cloonadrum
- Cloonlaheen East
- Cloonlaheen Middle
- Cloonlaheen West
- Coor East
- Coor West
- Craggaun
- Craggaknock East
- Craggaknock West
- Creevagh
- Derreen
- Doolough
- Doonogan
- Doonsallagh East
- Doonsallagh West
- Drummin
- Emlagh
- Finnor Beg
- Finnor More
- Kilclehaun
- Killernan
- Knockanalban
- Knocknahila Beg
- Knocknahila More North
- Knocknahila More South
- Knockloskeraun
- Lissyneillan
- Molosky
- Moyglass Beg
- Moyglass More
- Mutton Island
- Quilty East
- Quilty West
- Rineroe
- Seafield
- Shanavogh East
- Shanavogh West
- Shandrum
- Treanmanagh
- Tromracastle
- Tromra East
- Tromra West

== Sources ==
- "Cill Mhuire Uí Bhreacáin". Placenames Database of Ireland.
