= Spanish Point, County Clare =

Seaside resort in County Clare, Ireland

Spanish Point Rinn na Spáinneach
- Village
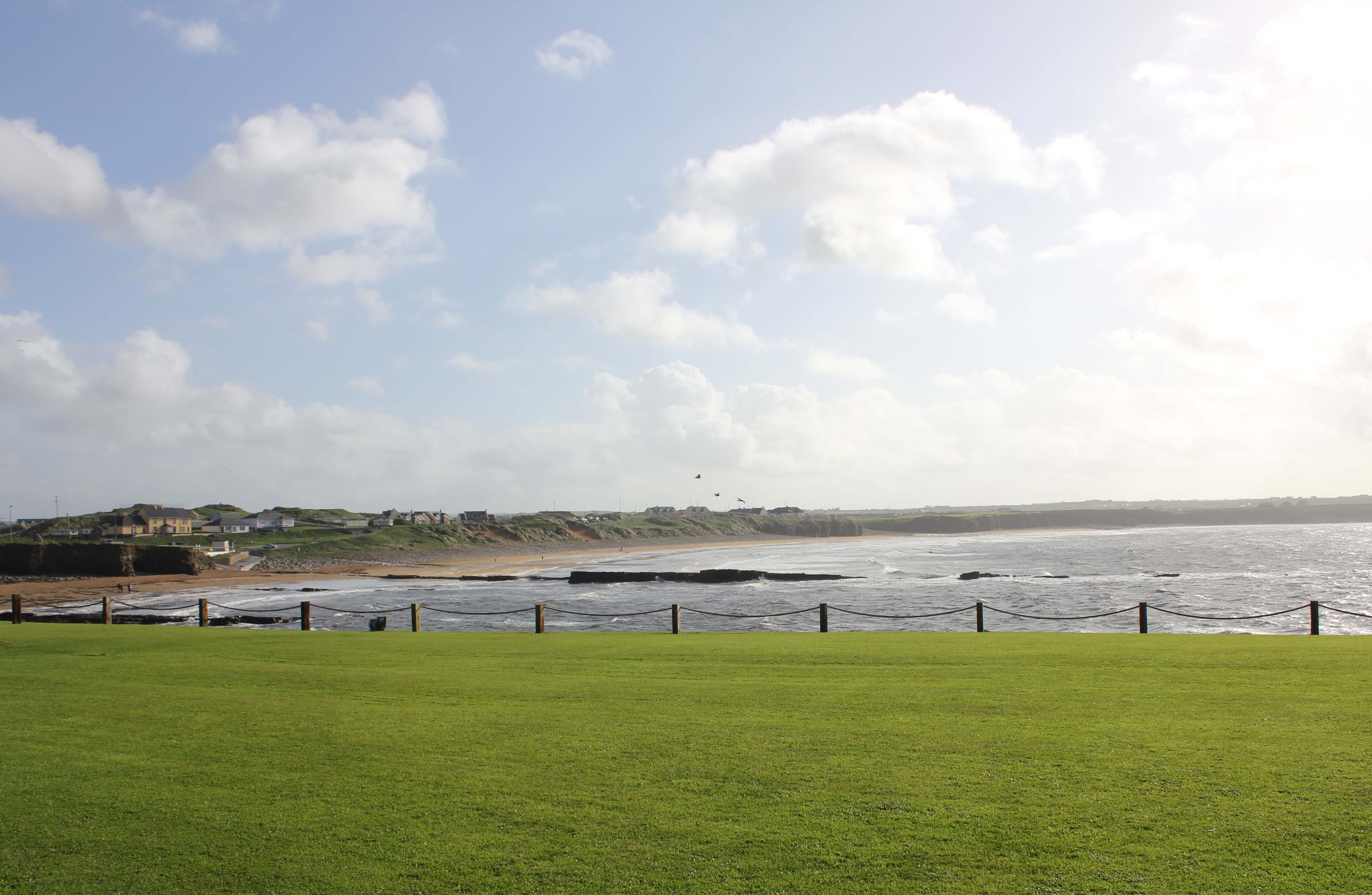
- Beach at Spanish Point

- Location in Ireland
- Coordinates: 52.845°N 9.437°W
- Country: Ireland
- Province: Munster
- County: County Clare

Population (2022)
  - Total: 261
- Irish Grid Reference: R029783

Spanish Point (Irish: Rinn na Spáinneach) is a village in the parish of Milltown Malbay in County Clare on the west coast of Ireland. It has many holiday homes, and in winter a significantly smaller population. The Beach, over a kilometre long, has Blue Flag Status and is suitable for swimming and surfing. It is also one of the better known surf breaks in County Clare. The name refers to the wrecking of some ships of the Spanish Armada off the coast.

== History ==
On the coast, 2.5 km (1.6 mi) from Milltown Malbay, Spanish Point was named after the Spanish who died here in 1588, when many ships of the Spanish Armada were wrecked during stormy weather. Those who escaped from their sinking ships and made it safely to land were later executed by Sir Turlough O'Brien of Liscannor and Boethius Clancy, High Sheriff of Clare.

It was not known by the English authorities in Ireland whether the Spanish sailed this way around Ireland because their ships were damaged and the storm prevented them from sailing back the quick way or if it was part of a Spanish plan to invade Ireland. As news of the English victory had not reached William FitzWilliam, the Lord Deputy of Ireland, he had issued a blanket command that all Spanish found in Ireland were to be executed with their ships and treasure seized. The executed Spanish were buried in a mass grave in an area of Spanish Point known locally as Tuama Na Spáinneach (Tomb of the Spaniards). Despite this, there was no archaeological evidence for the claim until 2015 when a group of historians investigating the location of the wreck of San Marcos stated they had found a mass grave under Spanish Point which contained the bodies of the executed Spanish sailors.

== Hotel ==
Spanish Point is home of the Atlantic Hotel which was built in 1810 and was promoted as the largest hotel in the British Isles. The hotel closed in 1930 as it had relied upon members of the British nobility visiting for income. This was as a result of the Irish War of Independence and subsequent establishment of the Irish Free State that dissuaded the wealthy from travelling to Spanish Point.

== Sport ==
Spanish Point has a nine-hole golf course which was founded in 1896, making it one of the oldest courses in Ireland.

Spanish Point Beach has Blue Flag Status, with facilities and free parking, and is a top surfing spot in Clare. Celtic Surf School is based here.

== See also ==
- List of towns and villages in Ireland
