= Kilfarboy =

Civil parish in County Clare, Ireland

Kilfarboy Cill Fear Buí
- Civil parish
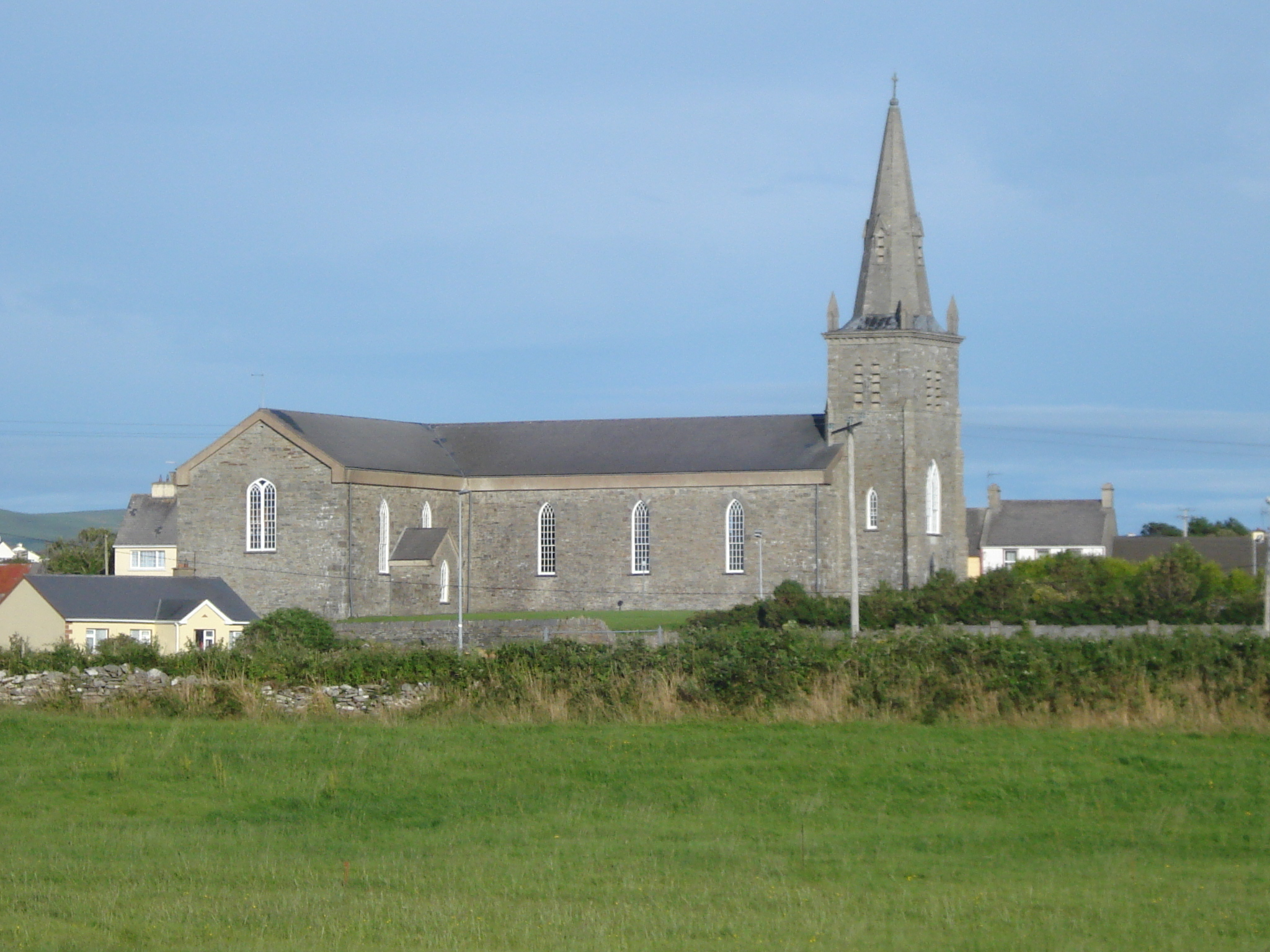
- St. Josephs Church, Milltown Malbay

- Location in Ireland
- Coordinates: 52.854802°N 9.401385°W
- Country: Ireland
- Province: Munster
- County: County Clare
- Elevation: 45 m (148 ft)
- Time zone: UTC+0 (WET)
  - Summer (DST): UTC-1 (IST (WEST))
- Irish Grid Reference: Q807509

Kilfarboy (Irish: Cill Fear Buí) is a civil parish in County Clare, Ireland. There is also a Catholic parish with the same name. The largest population centre in the parish is Milltown Malbay.

== Civil parish ==
The parish is part of the historic barony of Ibrickane. It is 5 by 4.5 miles (8.0 by 7.2 km) and covers 13,981 acres (5,658 ha). Cliffs extend along the coastline, which includes the headland of Spanish Point. The land rises in the east to the summit of Slievecallan. The main settlement is the town of Milltown Malbay.

=== History ===
The parish was once called Kilfobrick after a monastery with that name founded in 741. Cormac, who died in 837, is said to have been bishop. No traces are left of the monastery. A large sepulchral stone was found around 1784 at Loughnamina, on Mount Callan. It has an inscription in Ogham script, which was well-preserved when the stone was discovered, commemorating the death of the chief Conan.

Part of the Spanish Armada was wrecked on the coast on the place since called "Spanish Point". There is the ruin of a castle at Freagh and several ancient forts. The parish contains the ruins of Moy castle. The population in 1841 was 7,498 in 1,166 houses.

=== Townlands ===
Townlands are Aillbrack, Ballynew, Ballyvaskin North, Ballyvaskin South, Breaffy North, Breaffy South, Caherogan, Carrowkeel, Cloghaun Beg, Cloghaun More, Cloonbony, Clooneyogan North, Clooneyogan South, Dough, Drumbaun, Drummin, Fintra Beg, Fintra More, Freaghcastle, Freaghavaleen, Glendine North, Glendine South, Illaun, Illaunbaun, Kilcorcoran, Kildeema North, Kildeema South, Kilfarboy, Knockbrack, Lackamore, Leagard North, Leagard South, Leeds, Moy Beg, Moy More, Poulawillin, Silverhill, Slievenalicka, Toor and Tooreen.
