= Quilty, County Clare =

Fishing village in County Clare, Ireland

Quilty Irish: Coillte
- Village
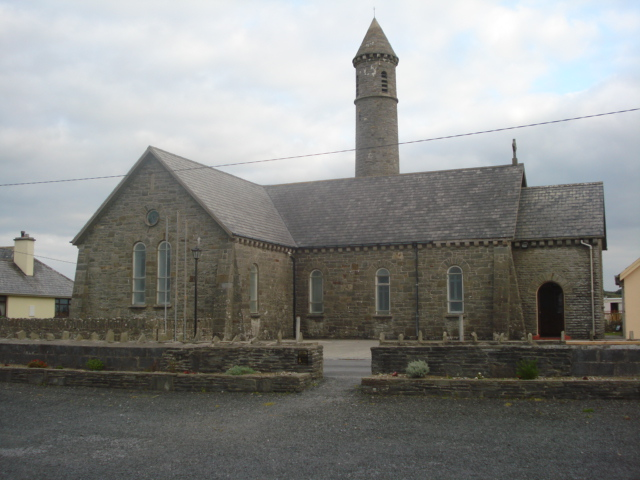
- Quilty's Catholic church

- Location in Ireland
- Coordinates: 52.8162°N 9.4555°W
- Country: Ireland
- Province: Munster
- County: County Clare
- Elevation: 17 m (56 ft)

Population (2022)
  - Total: 211
- Irish Grid Reference: R016751

Quilty (Irish: Coillte, meaning 'woods'), historically Killty, is a small fishing village between Milltown Malbay and Doonbeg in County Clare, Ireland. Lobster, salmon, bass, herring and mackerel are landed at Quilty, formerly known for its curing industry. The area was officially classified as part of the west Clare Gaeltacht, an Irish-speaking community, until 1956.

The local Catholic church, Our Lady Star of the Sea, belonging to Kilmurry Ibrickane parish, has a round tower which is visible from the surrounding countryside. It was built in remembrance of the Leon XIII rescue.

== History ==
=== Mutton Island ===
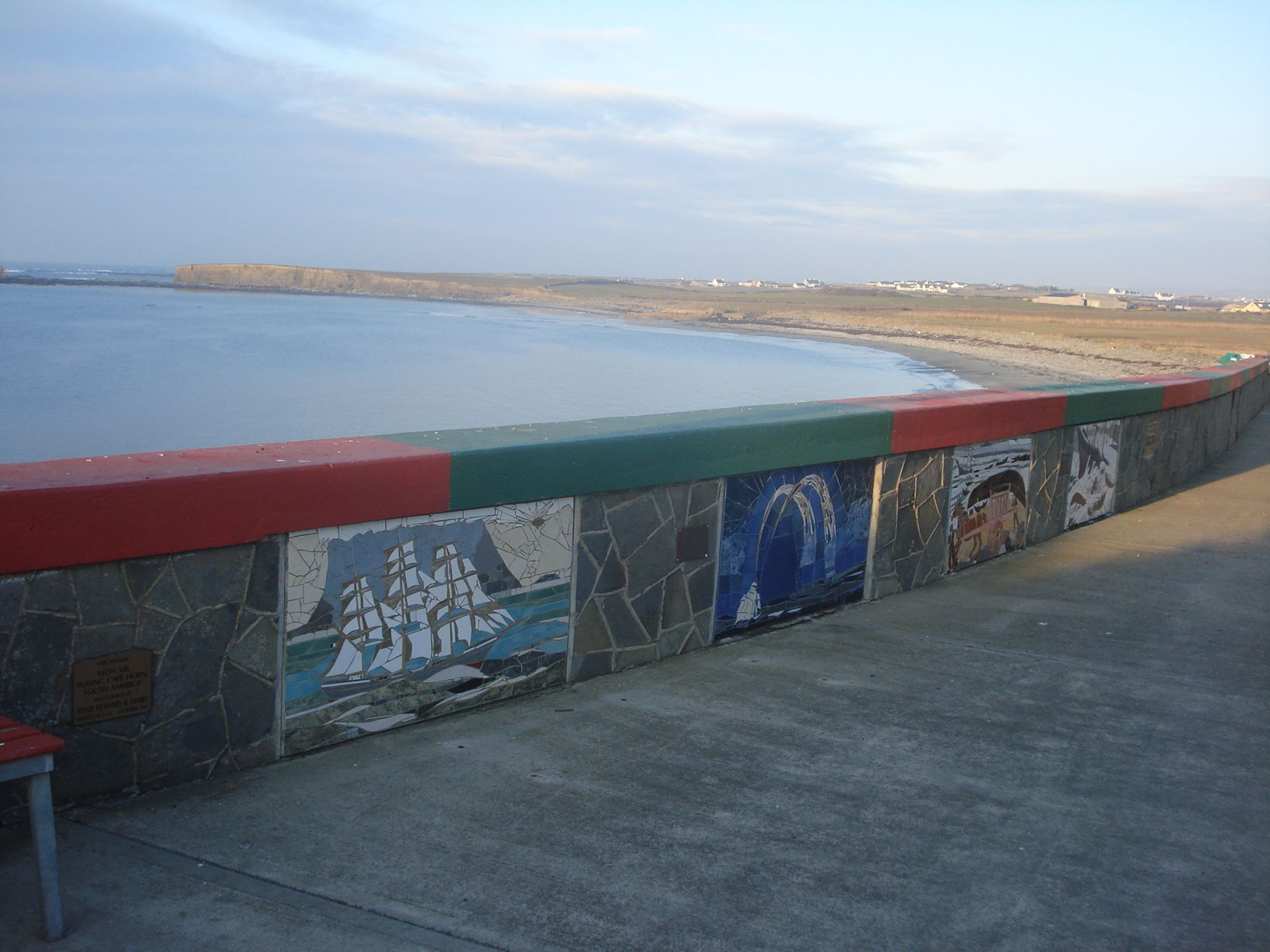
Mosaic on seawall in Quilty

Across the bay from Quilty is Mutton Island. Saint Senan founded a church here in the early 6th century but by 1887 little remained except the Bed of St Senan, a shattered cross and a gable of his oratory. A signal tower built in the early 19th century was designed to give warning of invasion during the Napoleonic period but was also used by the coastguard to prevent smuggling. In the early 20th century Mutton Island was used as a prison; during certain tidal conditions, it is possible to walk along a path of limestone from Seafield (near Quilty) to Mutton Island.

=== Tromoroe Castle ===
Tromoroe Castle lies about 3 km from the village. It witnessed a number of battles in the 16th century, the most notable when Teigh Caech McMahon with the help of the Earl of Desmond stormed the castle on 17 February 1599. The next attack was by O'Flaherty from Connacht on 1 May 1642, when Peter Ward, his wife and heir were slain.

=== Leon XIII ===
On 2 October 1907 a French three-masted full-rigged ship, the Leon XIII, was driven up on rocky reefs in Quilty Bay. All seemed lost for the ship and crew. The local fishermen, however, went out to sea in their currachs – risking the equinoctial gales and Atlantic breakers in small open boats. They reached the wreck and managed to save the crew and bring them safely ashore. The porch of Quilty's Catholic church contains a replica of the Leon XIII in a glass bottle, and the ship's bell stands in front of the church altar.

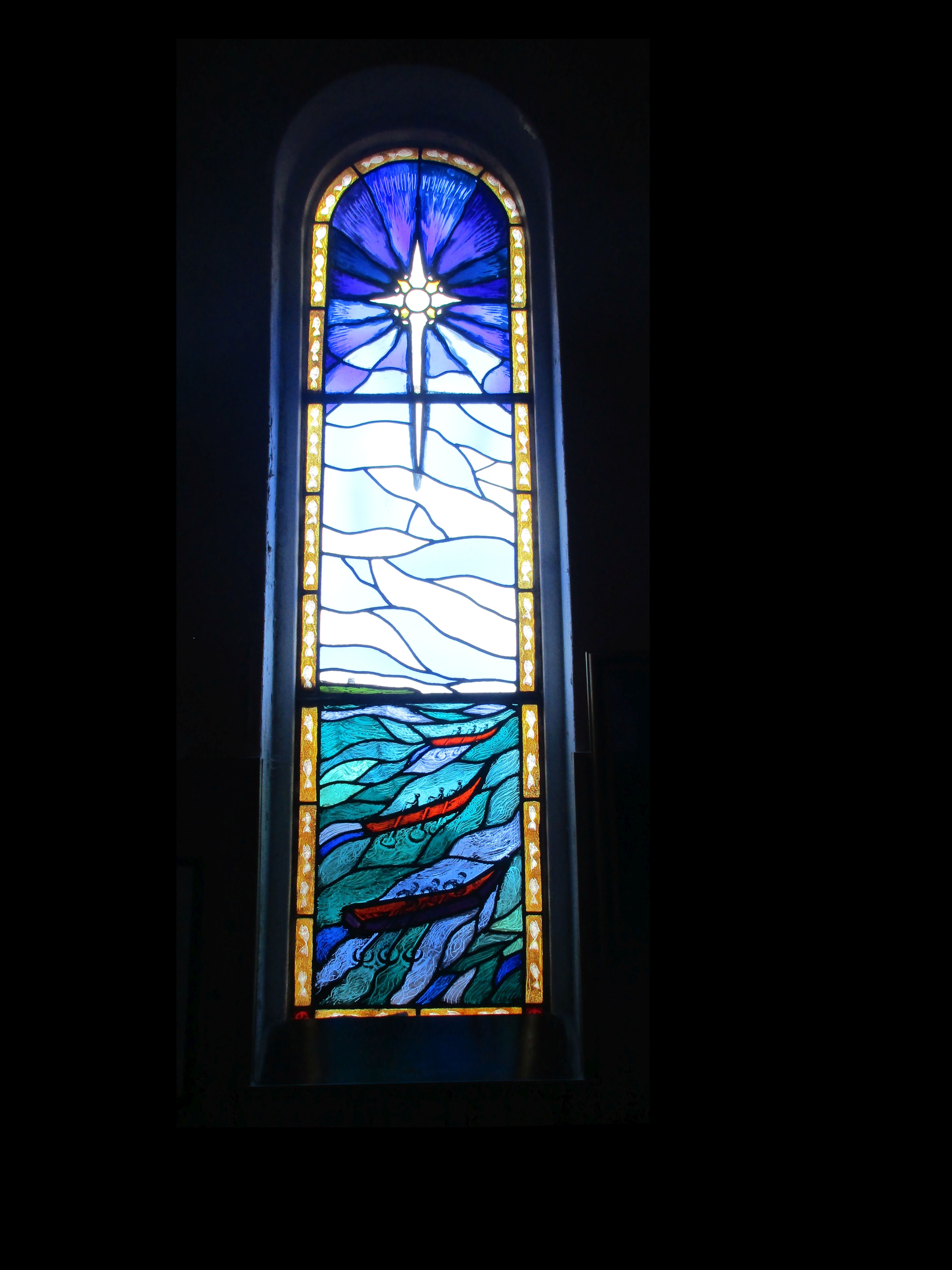
Curraghs launched

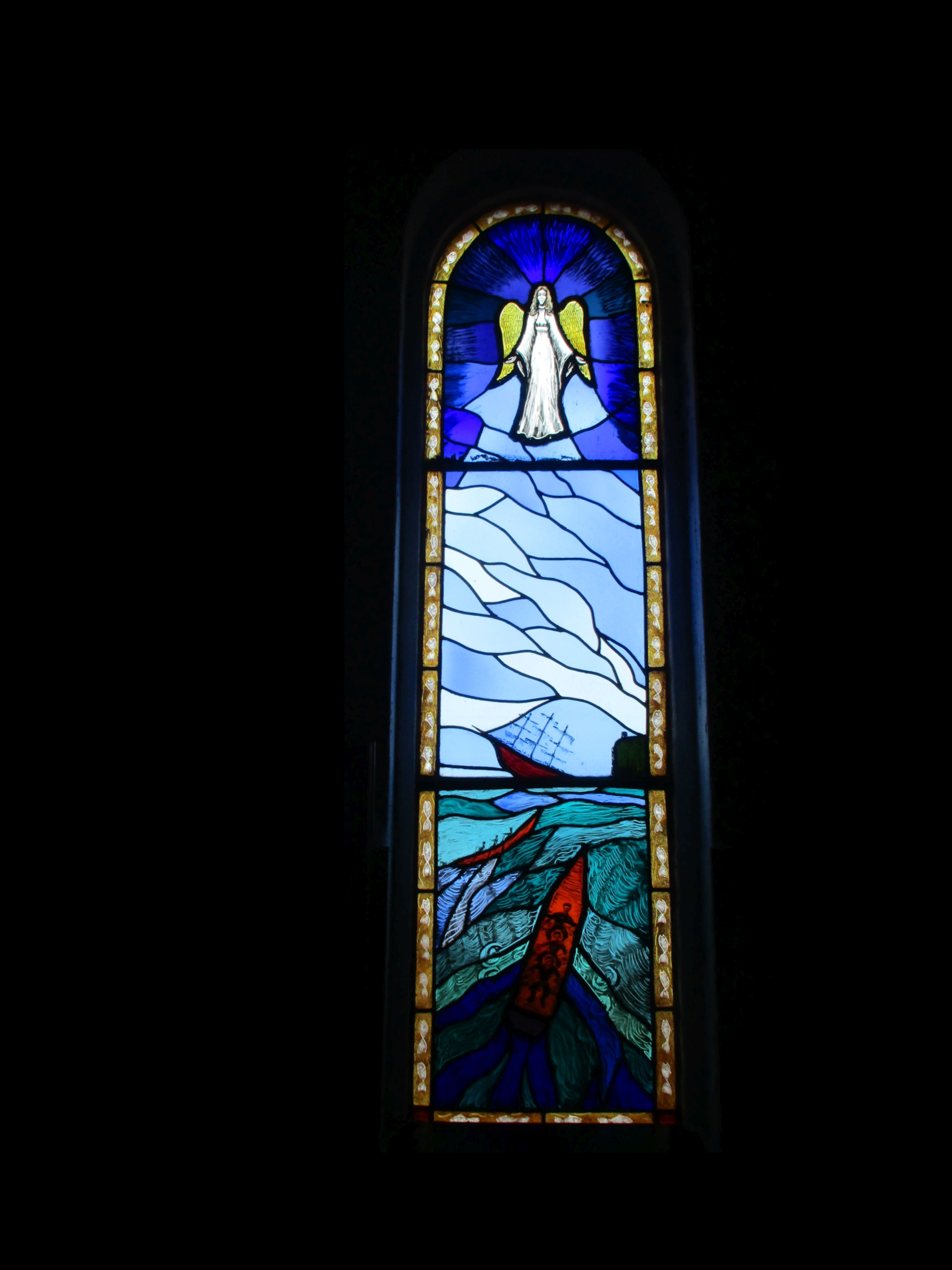
Curragh moving to Leon XIII.jpg

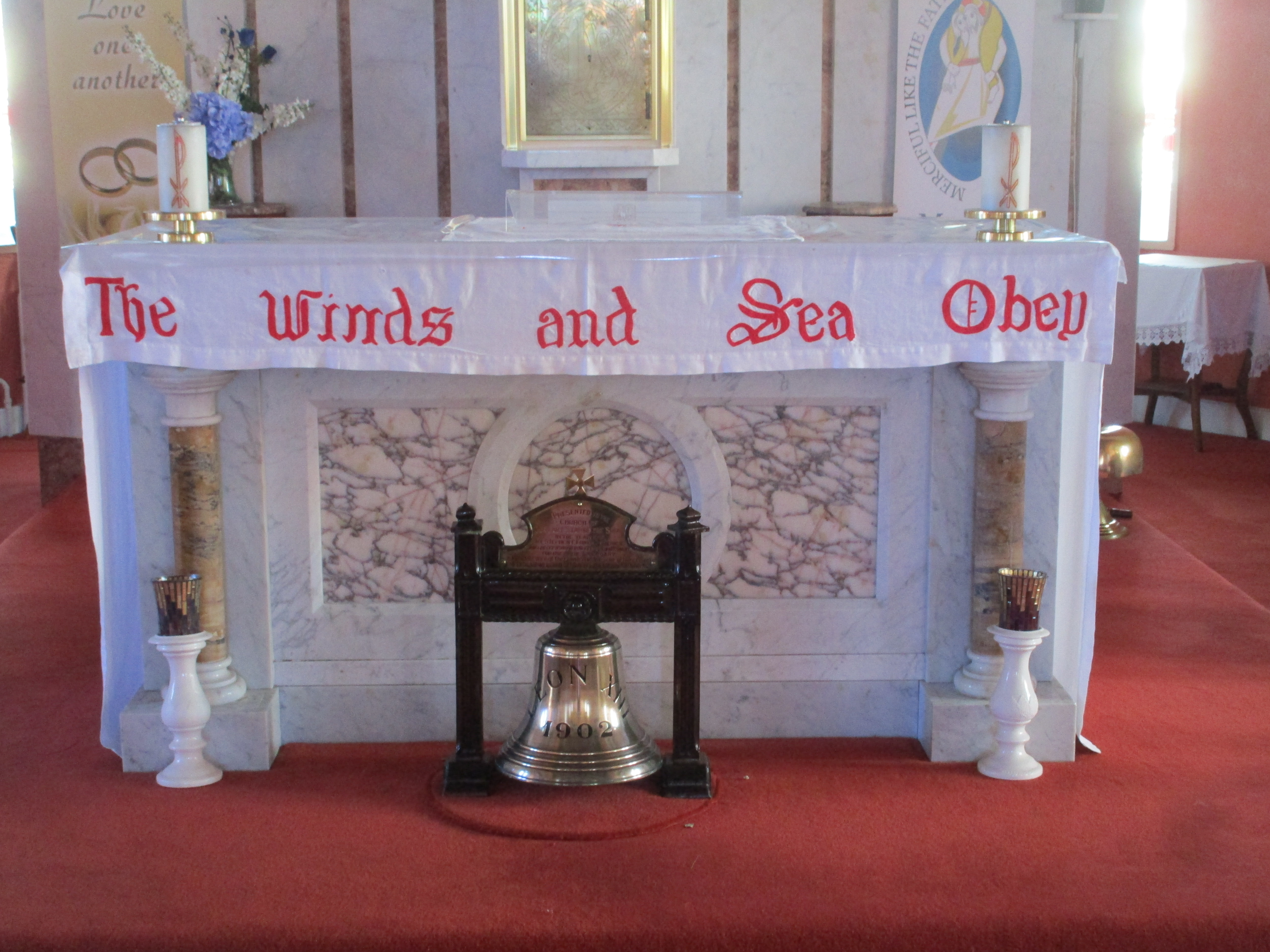
Altar and Leon XIII bell

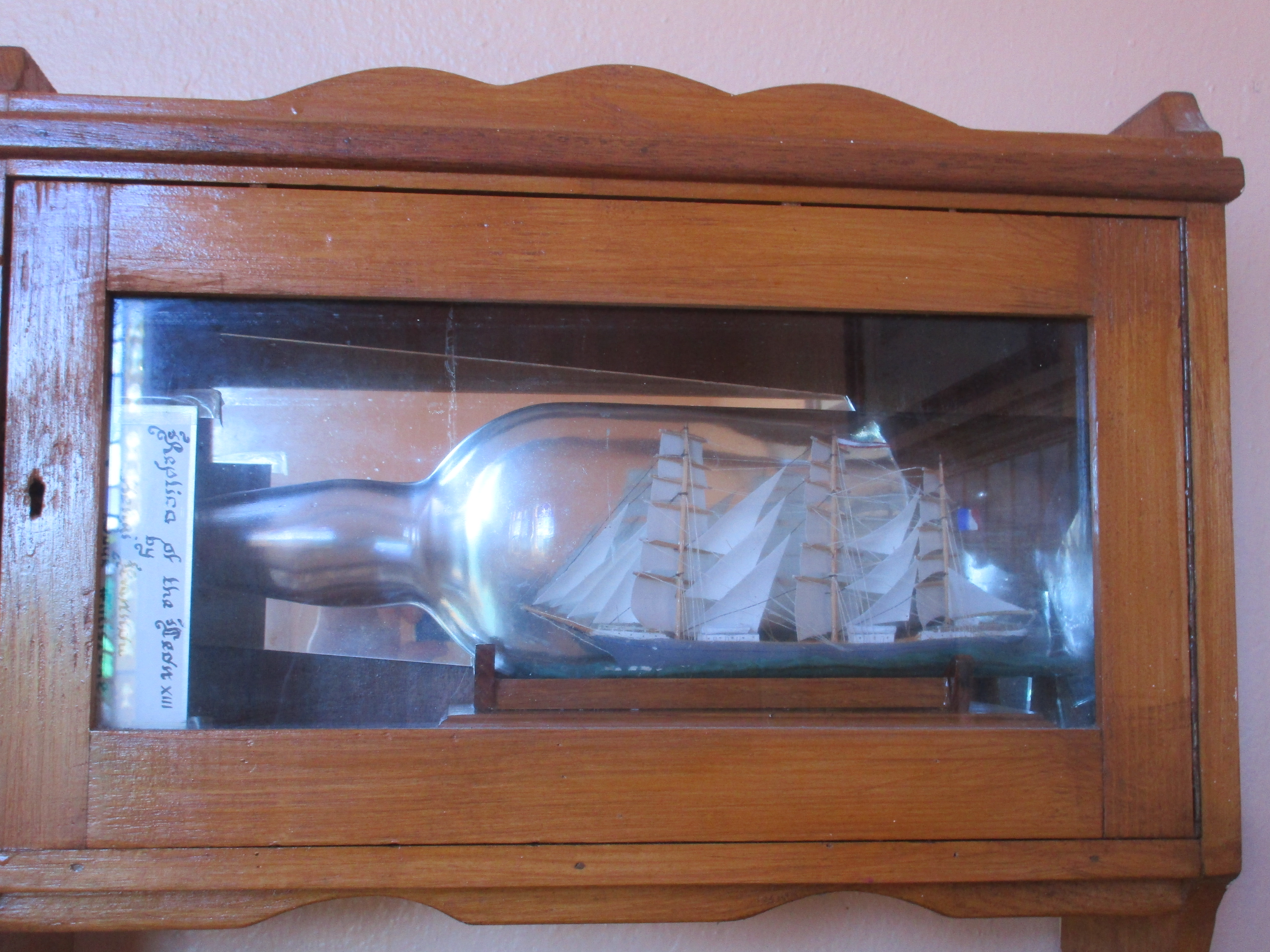
Bottled model of the Leon XIII present in the church porch

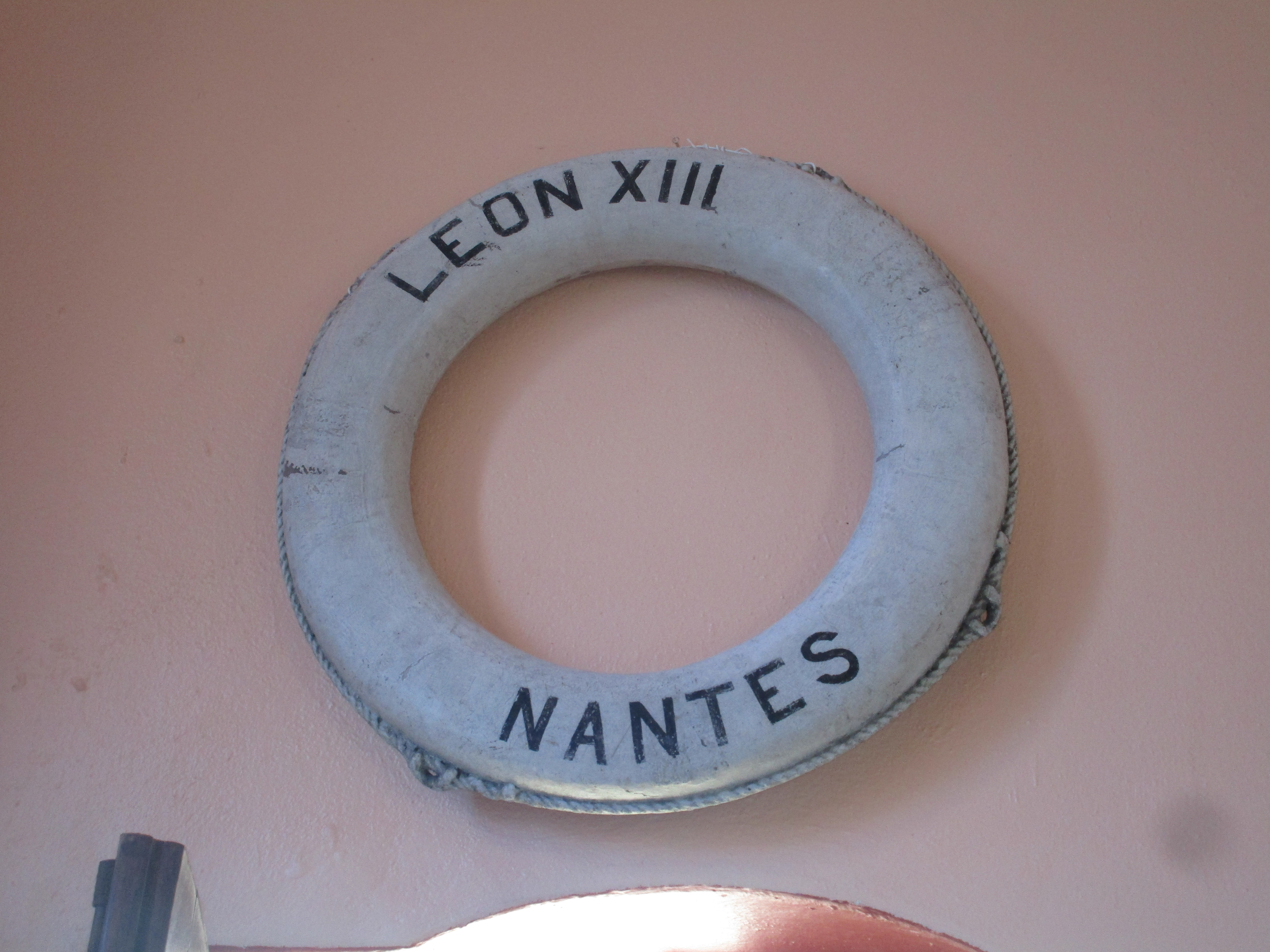
Life buoy Leon XIII present in church porch

== Sport ==
In the 1970s, Quilty GAA club amalgamated with Kilmurry Ibrickane GAA club. The club kept the name Kilmurry-Ibrickane GAA but started playing at the former club grounds in the village.

== Notable people ==
- Patricia Morrissey, camogie player

== See also ==
- List of towns and villages in Ireland
