= Milltown Malbay =

Town in County Clare, Ireland

Milltown Malbay Sráid na Cathrach (Irish)
- Town
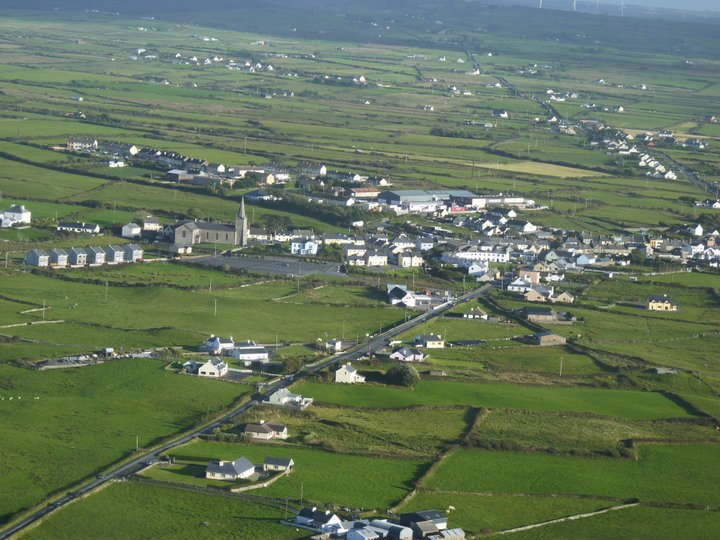
- Aerial view

- Location in Ireland
- Coordinates: 52°51′N 9°24′W
- Country: Ireland
- Province: Munster
- County: County Clare

Population (2022)
  - Total: 921
- Time zone: UTC+0 (WET)
  - Summer (DST): UTC-1 (IST (WEST))
- Irish Grid Reference: R054791

Milltown Malbay (Irish: Sráid na Cathrach, meaning 'street of the stone ringfort'), also Miltown Malbay, is a town in the west of County Clare, Ireland, near Spanish Point. The population was 921 at the 2022 census.

== Name ==
There is a townland on the southern edge of the town called Poulawillin or Pollawillin (from Irish Poll a' Mhuillinn, meaning 'hole/pool of the mill'). There is evidence that this name was once applied to the town – for example, in the Parish Namebook of the Ordnance Survey (1839) there is a reference to "Baile an Mhuillinn anciently Poll a’ Mhuillinn, Milltown Malbay".

Malbay is the name of the bay to the west of Milltown. The name Malbay is thought to come from the Irish meall-bhaigh, which roughly means "treacherous coast". It could also stem from the legend of the witch "Mal" who was drowned in the bay by Fionn mac Cumhaill.

== History ==
The town has only existed since about 1800 but grew rapidly: by 1821 it had a population of 600. During the Great Famine (1844–1848) many farmers were evicted by the unpopular landlord Moroney. In the years after the famine the (Protestant) Moroney family went on with rack renting and evictions. At one time the population had enough and started a boycott. The government did not like that and imprisoned all pub-owners and shopkeepers who refused to serve the family or their servant. So at the end of 1888 most pub-owners and shopkeepers were in jail.

In the lead up to the Irish War of Independence there were a number of incidents in Milltown Malbay. On 14 April 1920 the local population were celebrating the release of hunger strikers from Mountjoy Prison. It turned into the Shooting at Canada Cross when members of the Royal Irish Constabulary and the Royal Highland Infantry Regiment fired into the crowd wounding seven and killing three: Volunteer John O’Loughlan and two civilians Thomas O’Leary and Patrick Hennessy.

Milltown Malbay was also the site of the Rineen Ambush, which took place near Rineen on the main road to Lahinch and Ennistymon. On 22 September 1920, a RIC tender was ambushed there by the Mid-Clare Brigade of the IRA mainly in retaliation for the killing of Martin Devitt at Crow's Bridge earlier in the year. Six policemen were killed in the ambush. In reprisal for the Rineen Ambush, the Black & Tans ran amok in Ennistymon, Lahinch and Milltown Malbay killing six people and burning 26 buildings, including Ennistymon and Lahinch Townhalls.

The Atlantic Hotel was one of the victims of the War of Independence. Owned by the Moroney family and mainly visited by English gentry, the reduction in British tourism in Ireland following the War of Independence led to its closure around 1925. Milltown Malbay was served by the West Clare Railway, which operated from the 2 July 1887 and finally closed on 1 February 1961.

Historical population
Year	Pop.	±%
1821	600	—
1831	726	+21.0%
1841	1,295	+78.4%
1851	1,452	+12.1%
1861	1,339	−7.8%
1871	1,362	+1.7%
1881	1,100	−19.2%
1891	1,267	+15.2%
1901	1,013	−20.0%
1911	995	−1.8%
1926	788	−20.8%
1936	809	+2.7%
1946	732	−9.5%
1951	668	−8.7%
1956	782	+17.1%
1961	700	−10.5%
1966	721	+3.0%
1971	677	−6.1%
1981	726	+7.2%
1986	719	−1.0%
1991	615	−14.5%
1996	626	+1.8%
2002	562	−10.2%
2006	570	+1.4%
2011	777	+36.3%
2016	829	+6.7%
2022	921	+11.1%

== Business ==
The main sources of employment in the area are tourism and hospitality, construction and agriculture.

The town has seven pubs, a hairdresser and a barber's shop. Other businesses are, amongst others, three supermarkets, a hardware shop, a haberdashery, a post office, a bridal shop, a bookmaker's office, a pizzeria/burger takeaway, a Chinese takeaway, a fish & chip takeaway, a clothes shop, and a beauty salon. There are two pharmacies and three restaurants in the town. There are two medical practices and veterinarian practice. The town has two petrol stations and two vehicle repair workshops.

== Culture ==
There are 4 primary schools and 1 secondary school in the surrounding townlands. The primary schools are Milltown Malbay National School (in town), Rockmount National School (N.S.), Rineen N.S. and Moy N.S. (gaelscoil). The secondary school is St Joseph's Secondary School, Spanish Point. St Joseph's draws pupils from the parishes of Milltown Malbay, Kilmurry Ibrickane, Doonbeg, Inagh and Cooraclare.

The town is in the parish of Kilfarboy in the Roman Catholic Diocese of Killaloe, which covers Milltown Malbay and Moy. Parish churches are St Joseph's in Milltown Malbay and St Mary's in Moy.

=== Oidhreacht an Chláir Teo ===
Oidhreacht an Chláir Teo (Clare Institute for Traditional Studies) is a research institution located on Flag Road. Its main field of work is research and stimulation of the traditional culture in County Clare. Its stated goal is "the establishment of an institute for education in the traditional culture of Clare, directed primarily towards the higher education and lifelong learning sectors; the provision of a permanent, easily accessible, archive and library for material relevant to the traditional arts in general and, in particular, to the abundant material of local relevance; the provision of a performance centre and associated facilities." The main target of the institute are researchers, local people and students.

=== Willie Clancy ===
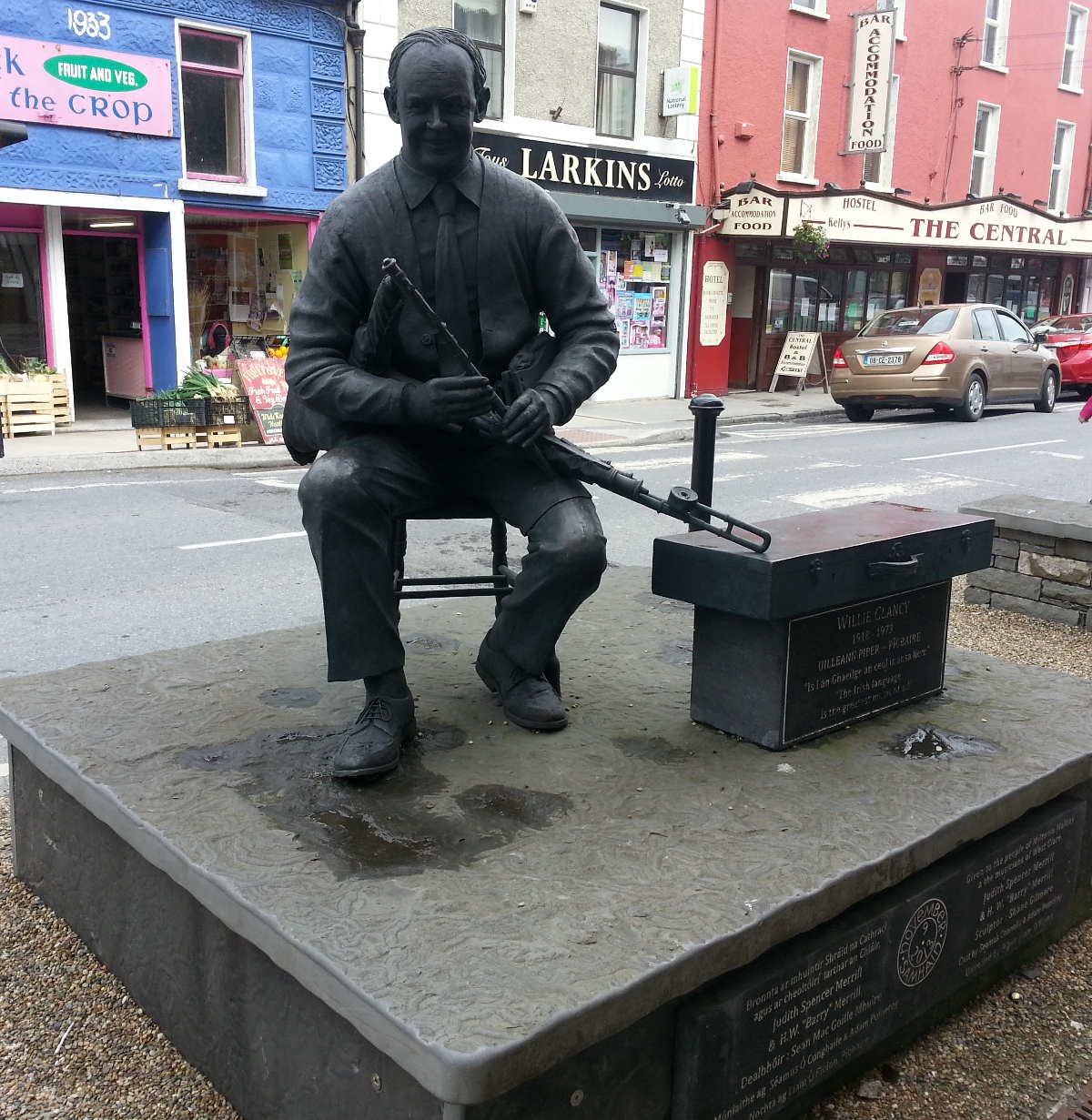
The memorial to Willie Clancy in Miltown Malbay, Ireland.

The town is home to the annual Willie Clancy Summer School and Festival. The Willie Clancy Summer School (Irish Scoil Samhraidh Willie Clancy) is Ireland's largest traditional music summer school held annually since 1973 in memory of and to honour the uilleann piper Willie Clancy.

=== GAA ===
Miltown Malbay is home to both St. Joseph's GAA (gaelic football) and Clonbony GAA (hurling).

Moy GAA is also located in the parish, but is more closely associated with the seaside town of Lahinch.

St. Joseph's GAA are the only senior football club in the parish. They have won the Clare SFC on fifteen occasions, most recently in 2019.

Clonbony GAA have won a senior camogie 'three-in-a-row' between 1983 and 1985.

==== Miltown Massacre ====
The lowest point for the Clare Senior Football team came in the 1979 Munster Championship which is locally known as the 'Miltown Massacre'. During a game played in Hennessy Park, the Clare inter-county team lost to Kerry by a scoreline of 1–09 (12) to 9–21 (48), a difference of thirty-six points.

== Notable people ==
- Aindrias Mac Cruitín (Andrew MacCurtin) (c.1670–1738), poet and scribe.
- Patrick Hillery, President of Ireland 1976–1990, was born at Spanish Point near Milltown Malbay in 1923.
- Matthew Joseph Kenny, lawyer and politician
- Máire Ní Shúilleabháin (1884–1914), Irish language activist and teacher
- Daniel Joseph Tobin (1875–1955), labour leader and president of the Teamsters 1907–1952
- Colonel Noel Walsh (1935–2020), commanding officer of the First Battalion of the Irish Army and former chairman of the Munster Council of the Gaelic Athletic Association

Musicians and singers

- Willie Clancy (1918–1973), uilleann piper
- Junior Crehan, fiddle player
- Kitty Hayes, concertina player
- Tom Lenihan, traditional singer
- Nonie Lynch, traditional singer
- Seán Óg, singer and musician
- Nora Cleary, traditional singer and lilter

== Gallery ==
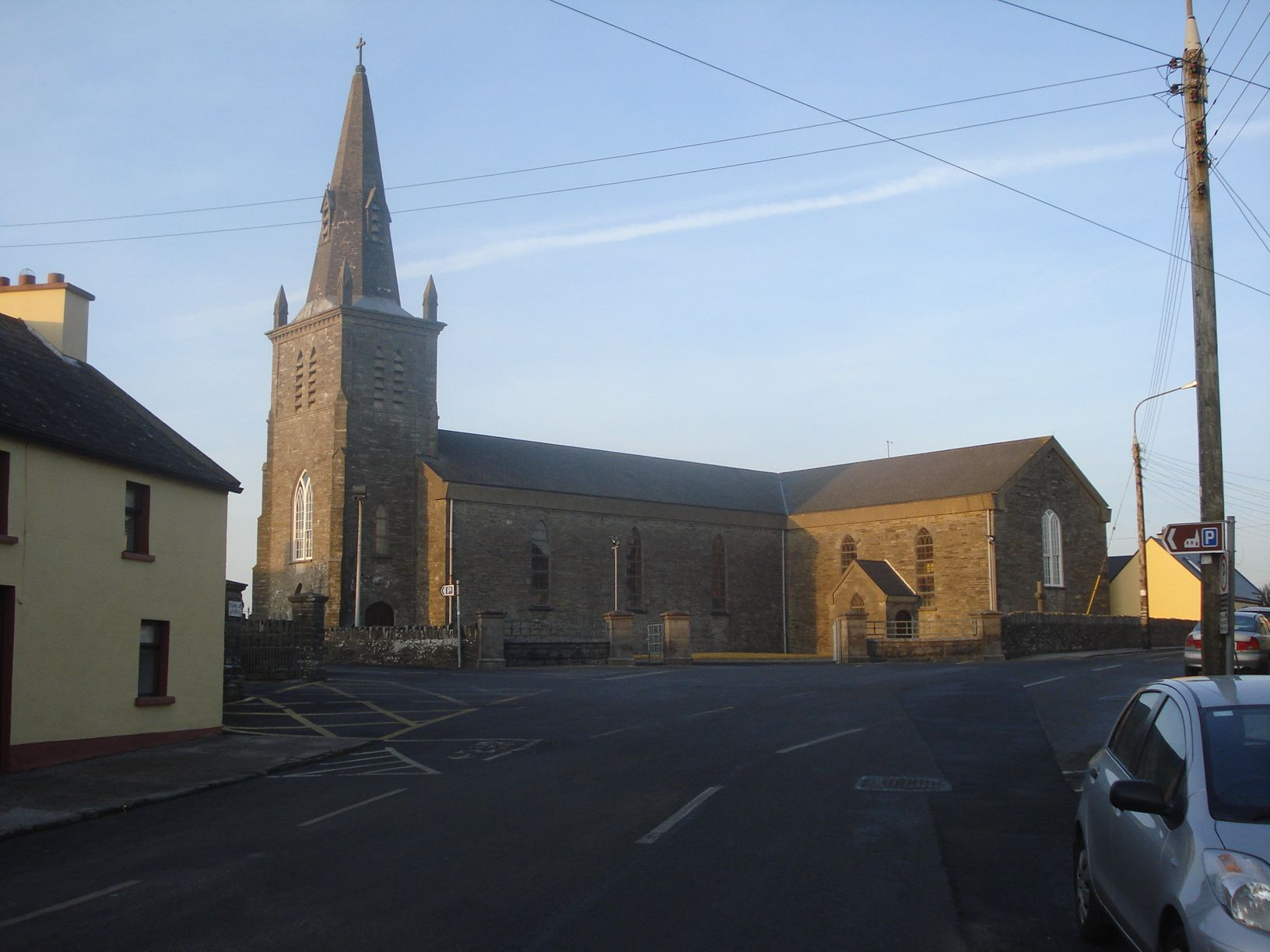
St Joseph's Church Milltown Malbay

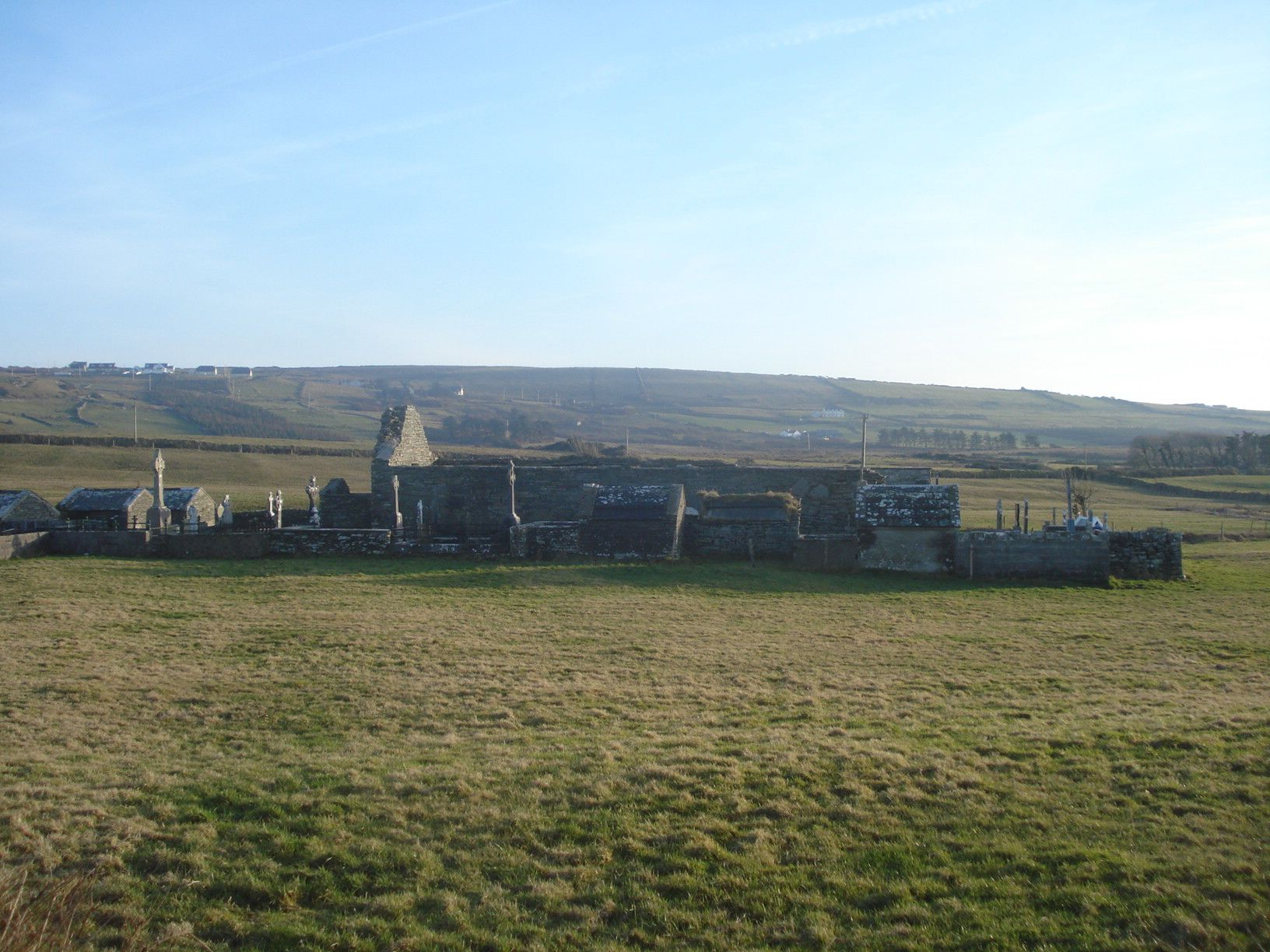
St. Laichtin's Church

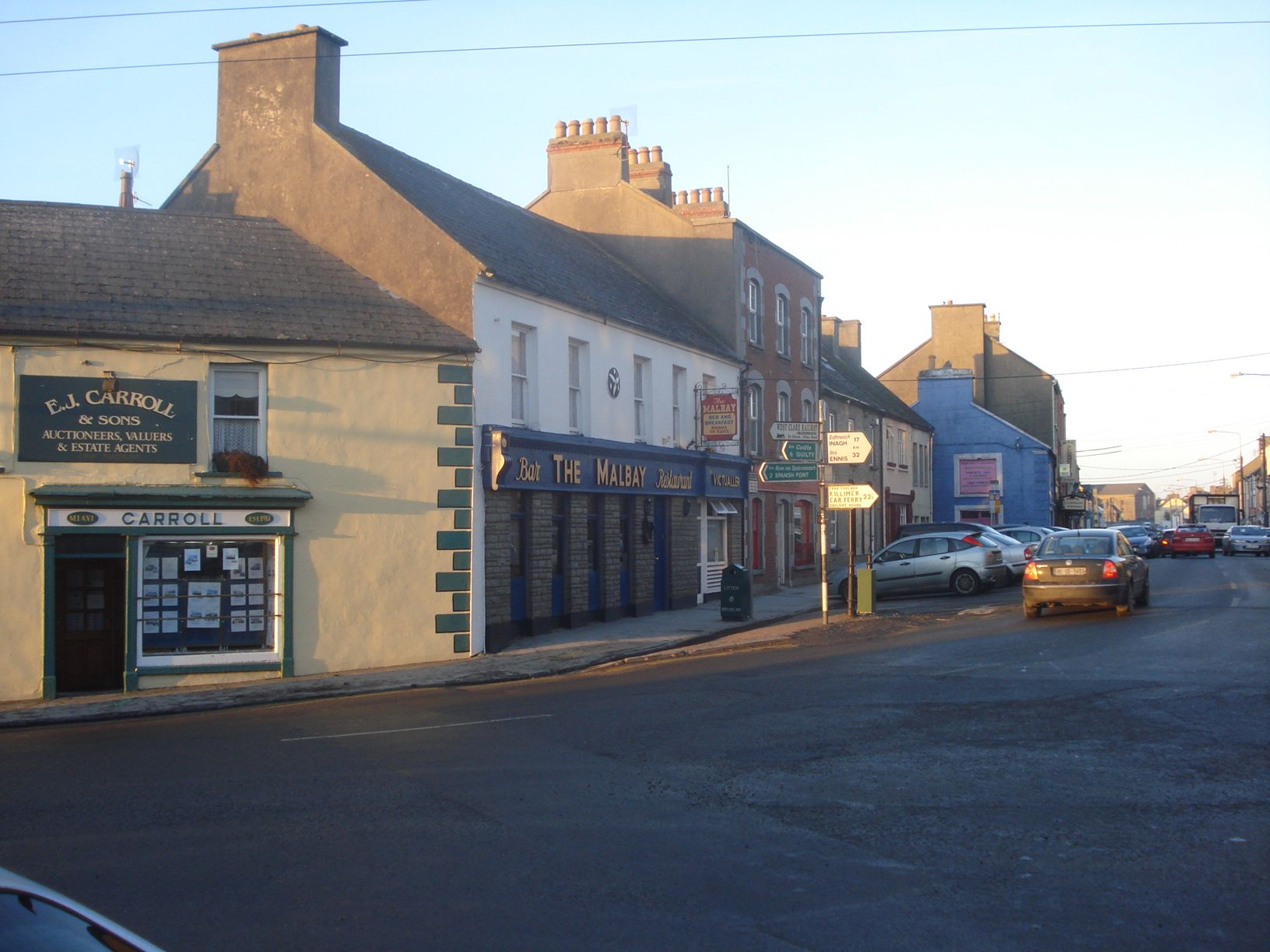
South side of Main Street

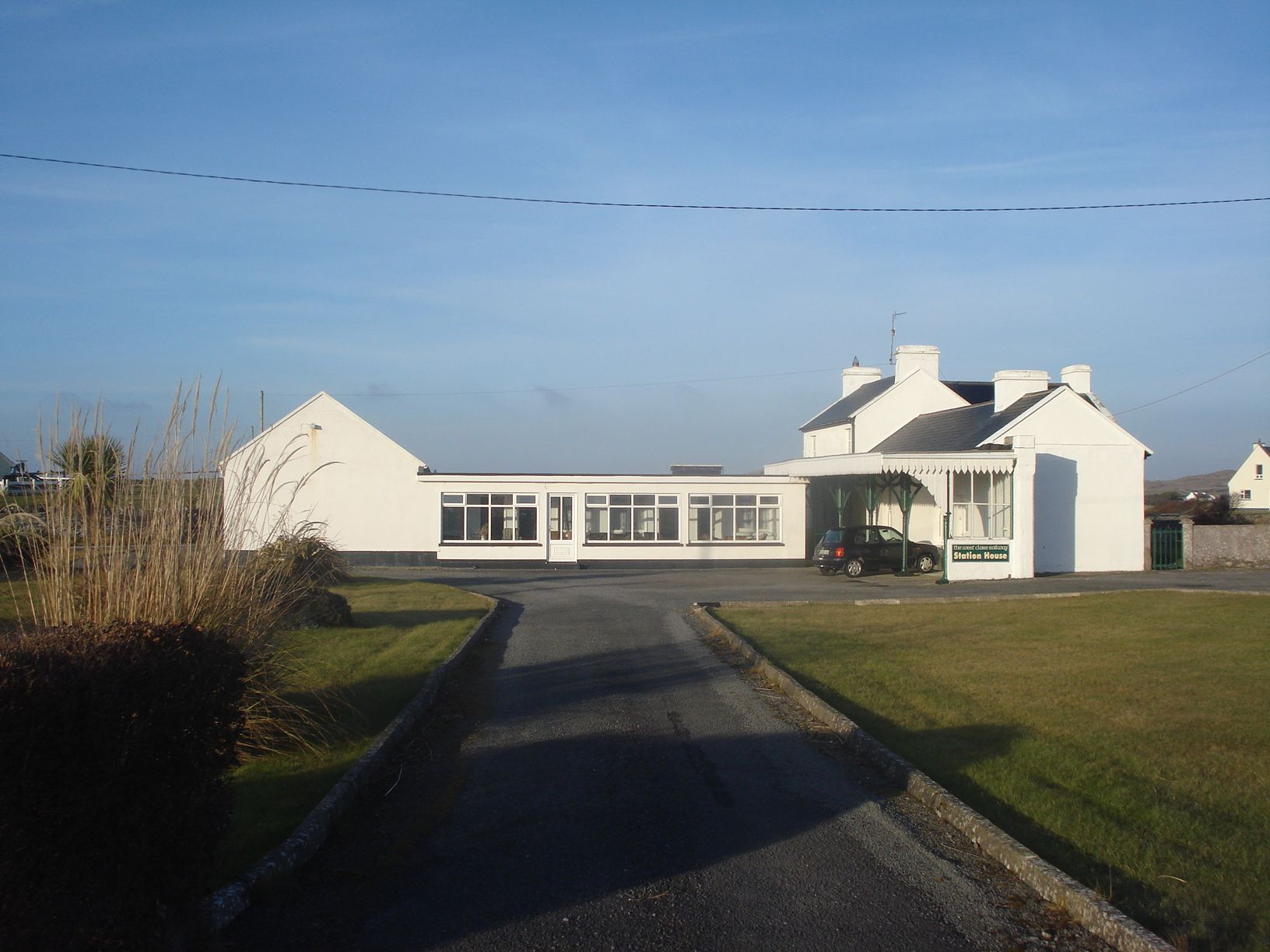
Former train station

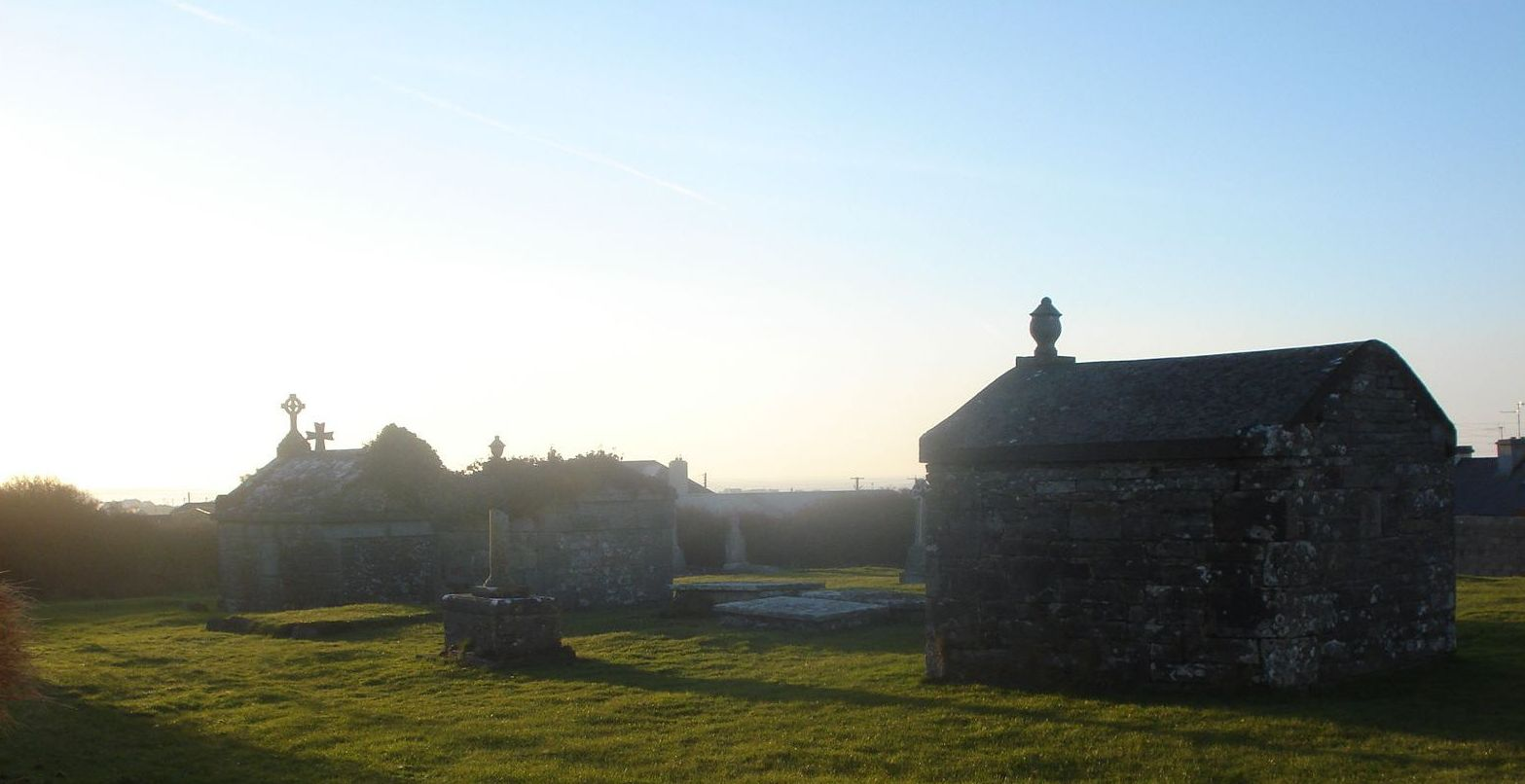
Church of Ireland graveyard

== See also ==
- List of towns and villages in the Republic of Ireland
- List of Irish towns with a Market House

== Bibliography ==
Notes

References

- Ruairc, Pádraig Óg Ó (2009). Blood on the Banner: The Republican Struggle in Clare 1913–1923. Mercier Press. ISBN 9781856356138. - Total pages: 351
