= Irish traditional music =

Genre of folk music

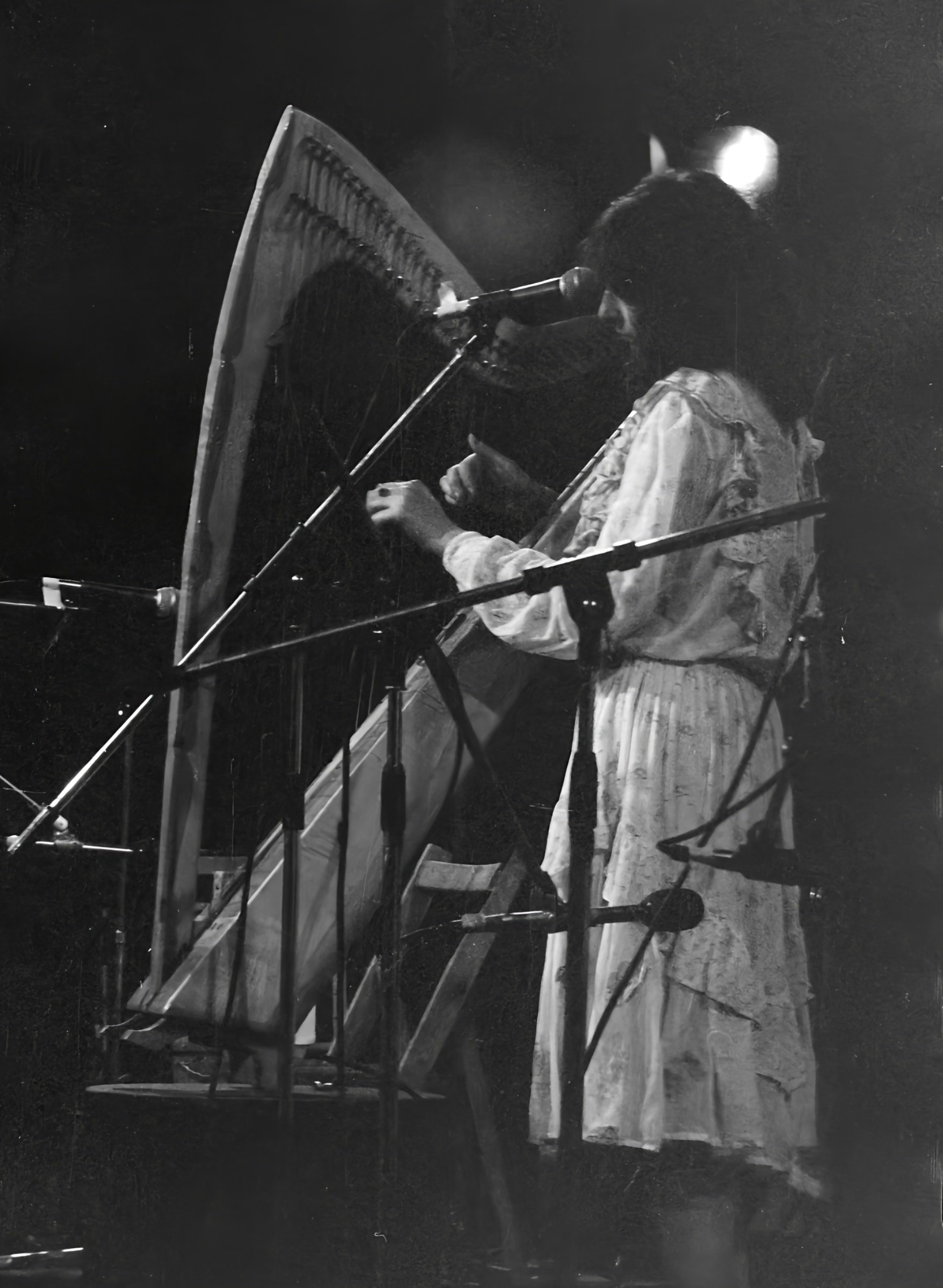
Moya Brennan of the Irish folk music band Clannad playing the harp at the Leeds Folk Festival, 1982

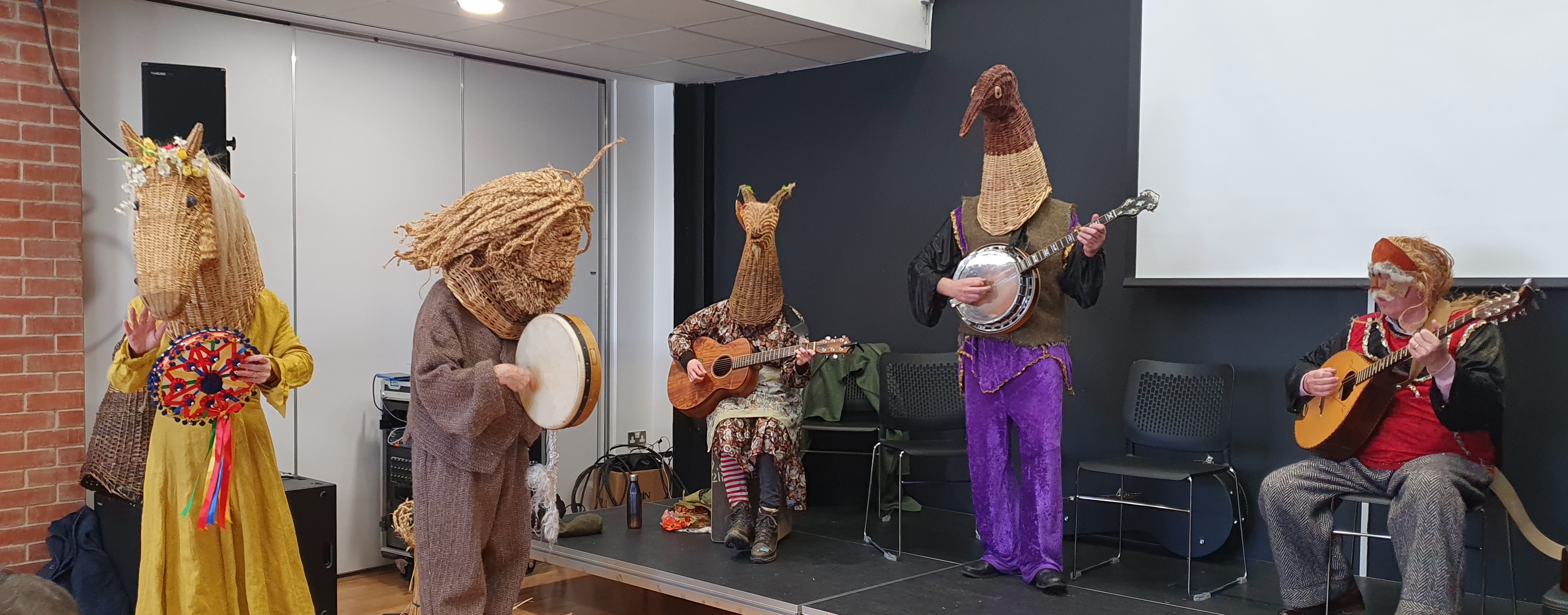
Irish folk music performers Armagh Rhymers at Aonach Mhacha in County Armagh, 2023

Irish music session in an Irish pub in Tokyo, 2016

Irish traditional music (also known as Irish trad, Irish folk music and similar names) is a genre of folk music that developed in Ireland. Following the establishment of the Irish Free State, Irish traditional music gained increased cultural significance as a symbol of national identity. It became associated with Ireland's Gaelic past and the context of nationalism and post-independence values.

In A History of Irish Music (1905), W. H. Grattan Flood wrote that, in Gaelic Ireland, there were at least ten instruments in general use. These were the crwth (a small rubbed strings harp) and cláirseach (a bigger harp with typically 30 strings), the tiompán (a small string instrument played with a bow or plectrum), the feadán (a fife), the buinne (an oboe or flute), the guthbuinne (a bassoon-type horn), the beannbhuabhal and corn (hornpipes), the cuislenna (bagpipes – see Great Irish warpipes), the stoc and storgán (clarions or trumpets), and the cnámha (bones). Within the tradition, there is poetic reference to the use of a fiddle as far back as the 7th century, which predates the development of the modern violin by around 900 years.

There are several collections of Irish folk music from the 18th century, but it was not until the 19th century that ballad printers became established in Dublin. Important collectors include Colm Ó Lochlainn, George Petrie, Edward Bunting, Francis O'Neill, James Goodman and many others. Though solo performance is preferred in the folk tradition, bands or at least small ensembles have probably been a part of Irish music since at least the mid-19th century, although this is a point of much contention among ethnomusicologists.

Irish traditional music has endured more strongly against the forces of cinema, radio and the mass media than the indigenous folk music of most countries in the west of Europe. From the end of the Second World War until the late fifties folk music was held in low regard. Comhaltas Ceoltóirí Éireann (an Irish traditional music association) and the popularity of the Fleadh Cheoil (music festival) helped lead the revival of the music. Following the success of the Clancy Brothers and Tommy Makem in the US in 1959, Irish folk music became fashionable again. The lush sentimental style of singers such as Delia Murphy was replaced by guitar-driven male groups such as the Dubliners. Irish showbands presented a mixture of pop music and folk dance tunes, though these died out during the seventies. The international success of the Chieftains and subsequent musicians and groups has made Irish folk music a global brand.

Historically much old-time music of the US grew out of the music of Ireland, England and Scotland, as a result of cultural diffusion. By the 1970s Irish traditional music was again influencing music in the US and further afield in Australia and Europe. It has occasionally been fused with rock and roll, punk rock and other genres.

== Gender in Irish Traditional Music ==
=== Women ===
In Irish traditional music, women were historically underrepresented in public performances as instrumentalists. Fiddler Julia Clifford stated that women instrumentalists were rarely seen performing publicly between the establishment of the Irish Free State during 1922 and the late 20th century. She also recalled being the only regular female musician performing in London pub sessions during the 1950s and early 1960s. Some performers, including Clifford, performed in competitions discreetly in order to pursue musical activity.

This limited visibility has been linked to the political and social structures in Ireland. In 1932, the Marriage Bar was established, requiring women to leave their civil service jobs upon marriage, while the 1937 Irish Constitution emphasized women's role to stay at home with their family. Cultural standards, influenced in part by the veneration of the Virgin Mary in the early 20th century Irish society, reinforced expectations that women prioritize domestic responsibilities over public artistic careers. Scholars such as Slomanski described women who continued playing music during this period as "tradition bearers".

Despite these challenges, a number of women were active in the tradition before the 1950s, including Elizabeth Crotty, Aggie Whyte, Eleanor Kane Neary, Sarah Makem and Julia Clifford. Patterns of emigration also formed women's participation. Between the period of 1926 to 1936, more women than men left Ireland, contributing to the spread of Irish Traditional Music abroad. An estimated number of 46,000 women left Ireland while only 30,000 men left.

Clifford later received recognition as a leading figure in the Sliabh Luachra music tradition. Her collaboration with Denis Murphy resulted in the 1969 album The Star above the Garter, which has been described as a significant recording of regional Irish music representing Country Kerry. Tunes associated with the pair, such as "Julia Clifford's Polka" became a part of the repertoire. Her playing style has also been noted for its ornamentation, including subtle pitch variation sometimes referred to as the "C-Supernatural".

From the late 20th century forward, the visibility of women in Irish traditional music increased. In 1984, musicians including Ursula Kennedy, Mary Clare Breathnach, and Seosaimhín Ní Bheaglaoich organized a concert in Dublin featuring exclusively women performers, emphasizing the gender imbalance in public performance spaces. The success of the event led to the formation of the group Macalla, which released the album Mná na hÉireann in 1984.

Between 1985 and 1990, nine bands with women musicians were released. Between 1990 and 2000, the numbers increased to forty-six. In 2024, Macalla reunited for a 40th anniversary concert on International Women's Day in Dublin. The careers of performers such as Julia Clifford and ensembles such as Macalla illustrate the challenges women in Irish Traditional Music have experienced and their continuous contributions.

=== LGBTQ+ Community ===
In recent years, the visibility of the LGBTQ+ community has increased through efforts. Trad is Amach (also known as Isteach is Amach) formed around 2020, is a collective of traditional Irish musicians, singers, and dancers. The group organizes concerts, sessions, and céilithe to promote Pride events and Irish traditional music festivals. Institutions such as the Irish Traditional Music Archive and events like Tradfest Temple Bar have been stated as important in fostering visibility of the LGBTQ+ community within Irish traditional music.

== Musical characteristics ==
=== Composition ===
Irish dance music is isometric; is built around patterns of bar-long melodic phrases akin to call and response. A common pattern is A Phrase, B Phrase, A Phrase, Partial Resolution, A Phrase, B Phrase, A Phrase, Final Resolution, though this is not universal. Mazurkas, for example, tend to feature a C Phrase instead of a repeated A Phrase before the Partial and Final Resolutions. Many tunes have pickup notes which lead in to the beginning of the A or B parts. Mazurkas and hornpipes have a swing feel, while other tunes have straight feels.

Tunes are typically binary in form, divided into two (or sometimes more) parts, each with four to eight bars. The parts are referred to as the A-part, B-part, and so on. Each part is played twice, and the entire tune is played three times; AABB, AABB, AABB. Many tunes have similar ending phrases for both A and B parts; it is common for hornpipes to have the second half of each part be identical. Additionally, hornpipes often have three quavers or quarternotes at the end of each part, followed by pickup notes to lead back to the beginning of the A part onto the B part. Many airs have an AABA form.

While airs are usually played singly, dance tunes are usually played in medleys of 2-4 tunes called sets.

Historically, tunes were often made up of a far greater number of parts than in modern times. Tunes of up to six parts are well documented in the written record, and there is no real solid rule regarding the number of parts a tune might have; One of the more extreme examples includes a tune comprising 24 parts. While shorter tunes are perhaps more common nowadays, lengthy tunes are still sometimes played in jam circles in modern times.

=== Modes ===
Irish music generally is modal, using Ionian, Aeolian, Dorian, and Mixolydian modes, as well as hexatonic and pentatonic versions of those scales. Some tunes do feature accidentals.

=== Ornamentation ===
Singers and instrumentalists often embellish melodies through ornamentation, using grace notes, rolls, cuts, crans, or slides.Grace notes are a type of ornamentation in Irish traditional music, utilized to articulate main notes rather than additional melodic notes. On common traditional instruments, the grace notes are produced by a rapid flick or movement of the finger near the main note. They are typically noted as very short-duration notes, often called demisemiquavers, to indicate fast realization.

Cuts are rapid rhythmic articulations of a main note that have three forms. They are known as the single cut, the dividing cut, and the double cut. When two notes of the same pitch are separated by a cut from a lower or high pitch, they are considered cuts. Diving cuts have similar structure to the classical ornament known as mordent in the conventional notation.

Cran is an ornament commonly related with the uilleann pipes. It typically surrounds one note, usually a D, from which a rapid series of ornamenting notes branch off, creating a rhythmic effect sometimes referred to as a "gurgling D". The term "cran" comes from the Irish Gaelic word crann, meaning "tree," representing the extra notes branching out from the main note.

Rolls are sometimes mistaken for the classical ornament known as a turn. In a roll, the main note remains central, while additional notes below and above it works as ornaments. There are two types of rolls, known as the short roll and the long roll, which occur over the same timing to crans. A feature of the roll is a slight crescendo through the ornament, highlighting the principal note.

Trebles and triplets are distinct rhythmic ornaments in Irish traditional music. Trebling refers to the playing of three notes of the same pitch within the duration of two quavers. Triplets differ in their rhythmic structure, as the beat is divided into three equal parts. In contrast, trebles often feature uneven timing, with the first two notes typically played more rapidly than the third.

=== Accompaniment ===
While uilleann pipes may use their drones and regulators to provide harmonic backup, and fiddlers often use double stops in their playing, due to the importance placed on the melody in Irish music, harmony is typically kept simple or absent. Usually, instruments are played in strict unison, always following the leading player. True counterpoint is mostly unknown to traditional music, although a form of improvised "countermelody" is often used in the accompaniments of bouzouki and guitar players. In contrast to many kinds of western folk music, there are no set chord progressions to tunes. Many accompanists use power chords to let the melody define the tonality or use partial chords in combination with ringing drone strings to emphasize the tonal center. Many guitarists use DADGAD tuning because it offers flexibility in using these approaches, as does the GDAD tuning for bouzouki.

== Music for singing ==
Like all traditional music, Irish folk music has changed slowly. Most folk songs are less than 200 years old. One measure of its age is the language used. Modern Irish songs are written in English and Irish. Most of the oldest songs and tunes are rural in origin and come from the older Irish language tradition. Modern songs and tunes often come from cities and towns, Irish songs went from the Irish language to the English language. In the late 1900s Frank Harte composed more ribald songs for the urban pub scene; the genre moved effortlessly from the countryside to the town.

=== Sean-nós songs ===
Be Thou My Vision, an Irish hymn sung by Gareth Hughes in Old Irish.

Unaccompanied vocals are called sean nós ("in the old style") and are considered the ultimate expression of traditional singing. This is usually performed solo (very occasionally as a duet). Sean-nós singing is highly ornamented and the voice is placed towards the top of the range. A true sean-nós singer, such as Tom Lenihan, will vary the melody of every verse, but not to the point of interfering with the words, which are considered to have as much importance as the melody.

Sean-nós can include non-lexical vocables, called lilting, also referred to by the sounds, such as "diddly die-dely".

Non-sean-nós traditional singing, even when accompaniment is used, uses patterns of ornamentation and melodic freedom derived from sean-nós singing, and, generally, a similar voice placement.

=== Caoineadh songs ===
Caoineadh (Irish: [kˠiːnʲə(w)]) is Irish for a lament, a song which is typified by lyrics which stress sorrow and pain. The word is Anglicised as "keening". Traditionally, the Caoineadh song contained lyrics in which the singer lamented for Ireland after having been forced to emigrate due to political or financial reasons. The song may also lament the death of a family member or the lack of news from loved ones. In Irish music, the Caoineadh tradition was once widespread, but began to decline from the 18th century onwards, becoming almost completely extinct by the middle of the 20th century. Examples of Caoineadh songs include: "Far Away in Australia", "The Town I Loved So Well", "Going Back to Donegal" and "Four Green Fields". Caoineadh singers were originally paid to lament for the departed at funerals, according to National Folklore Collection. The "keener" would recite the kind deeds of the deceased in a sobbing and mournful manner.

== Dance music ==
=== Social settings ===
Irish traditional music and dance has seen a variety of settings, from house parties, country dances, ceili dances, stage performances and competitions, weddings, saint's days or other observances. The most common setting for Irish dance music is the seisiún, which very often features no dancing at all.

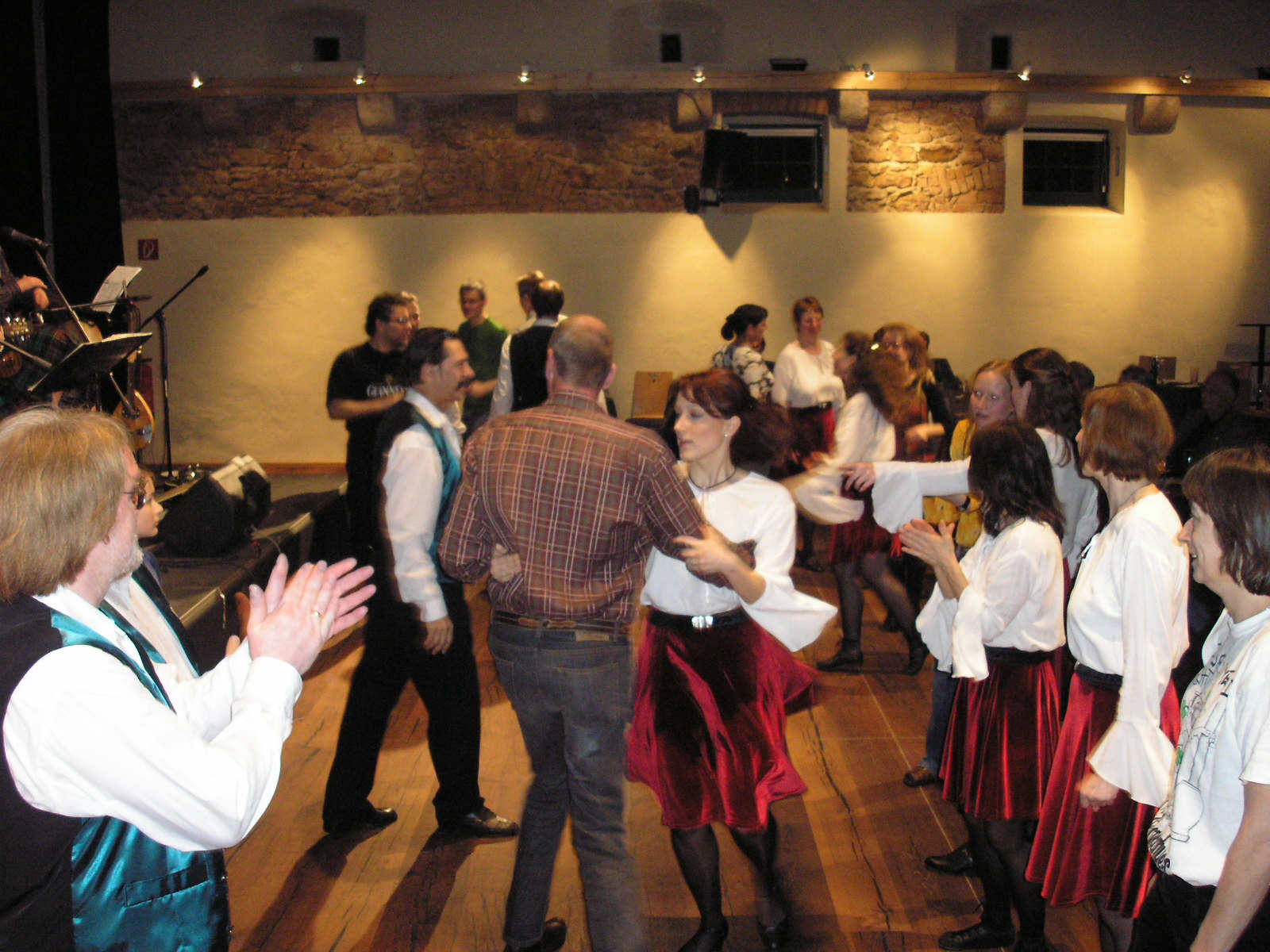
The Haymakers jig

=== Repertoire ===
Traditional dance music includes reels (2/2 or 4/4), hornpipes (4/4 with swung eighth notes), and jigs (double and single jigs are in 6/8 time). Jigs come in various other forms for dancing – the slip jig and hop jig are commonly written in 9/8 time.

Later additions to the repertoire include the waltz (3/4 with a heavy accent on the down beat) and, in County Donegal, mazurkas in the same time signature, though with an accent on the 2nd beat. Donegal is also notable for its "highland", a sort of Irish version of the Scottish strathspey, but with a feel closer to a reel with the occasional scots snap.

Polkas are a type of 2/4 tune mostly found in the Sliabh Luachra area, at the border of Counties Cork and Kerry, in the south of Ireland. Another distinctive Munster rhythm is the Slide in 12/8 time.

=== Style ===
The concept of "style" is of large importance to Irish traditional musicians. At the start of the 19th century, distinct variation in regional styles of performance existed. With the release of American recordings of Irish traditional musicians (e.g. Michael Coleman 1927) and increased communications and travel opportunities, regional styles have become more standardised. Regional playing styles remain nonetheless, as evidenced by the very different playing styles of musicians from Donegal (e.g. Tommy Peoples), Clare (e.g. brothers John & James Kelly) and Sliabh Luachra (e.g. Jacky Daly). Donegal fiddle playing is characterised by fast, energetic bowing, with the bow generating the majority of the ornamentation; Clare fiddle playing is characterised by slower bowing, with the fingering generating most of the ornamentation. While bowed triplets (three individual notes with the bow reversed between each) are more common in Donegal, fingered triplets and fingered rolls (five individual notes fingered with a single bow stroke) are very common in Clare.

Stage performers from the 1970s and 1980s (groups such as The Bothy Band, or soloists such as Kevin Burke) have used the repertoire of traditional music to create their own groups of tunes, without regard to the conventional 'sets' or the constraint of playing for dancers. Burke's playing is an example of an individual, unique, distinctive style, a hybrid of his classical training, the traditional Sligo fiddle style and various other influences.

== Instruments used in traditional Irish music ==
The most common instruments used in Irish traditional dance music, whose history goes back several hundred years, are the fiddle, tin whistle, flute and Uilleann pipes. Instruments such as button accordion and concertina made their appearances in Irish traditional music late in the 19th century. The 4-string tenor banjo, first used by Irish musicians in the US in the 1920s, is now fully accepted. The guitar was used as far back as the 1930s first appearing on some of the recordings of Michael Coleman and his contemporaries. The bouzouki only entered the traditional Irish music world in the late 1960s.

The word bodhrán, indicating a drum, is first mentioned in a translated English document in the 17th century. The saxophone featured in recordings from the early 20th century most notably in Paddy Killoran's Pride of Erin Orchestra. Cèilidh bands of the 1940s often included a drum set and stand-up bass as well as saxophones. Traditional harp-playing died out in the late 18th century, and was revived by the McPeake Family of Belfast, Derek Bell, Mary O'Hara and others in the mid-20th century. Although often encountered, it plays a fringe role in Irish Traditional dance music.

The piano is commonly used for accompaniment. In the early 20th century, piano accompaniment was prevalent on the 78 rpm records featuring Michael Coleman, James Morrison, John McKenna, PJ Conlon and many more. On many of these recordings, the piano accompaniment was woeful because the backers were unfamiliar with Irish music. However, Morrison avoided using the studio piano players and hand-picked his own. The vamping style used by these piano backers has largely remained. There has been a few recent innovators such as Mícheál Ó Súilleabháin, Brian McGrath, Liam Bradley, Josephine Keegan, Ryan Molloy and others.

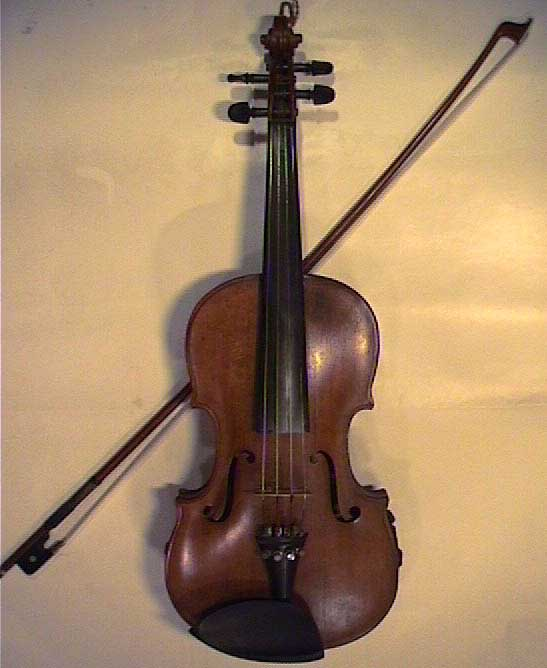
A fiddle and bow

=== Fiddle (violin) ===
One of the most important instruments in the traditional repertoire, the fiddle (almost always a violin used in a fiddle style) is played differently in widely varying regional styles. It uses the standard GDAE tuning. The best-known regional fiddling traditions are from Counties Donegal, Sligo, Clare as well as Sliabh Luachra.

The fiddle has ancient roots in Ireland, although any reference to a fiddle before the 16th century would have been to an instrument distinct from the modern violin, as the modern violin was invented in 16th-century northern Italy. The earliest reference to the fiddle in Ireland was during the 7th century by O'Curry.

In 1674, Richard Head wrote in reference to Ireland 'On Sundays: In every field a fiddle, and the girls footing until they foam up' suggesting that the modern fiddle was already present in Ireland. Reference to the Irish fiddle can also be found in John Dunton's Teague Land: or A Merry Ramble to the Wild Irish (1698). He said "on Sundays and Holydays, all the people resorted with the piper and fiddler to the village green". When Thomas Dineley visited Ireland in 1680 he said in regards to music that people "with piper, harper, or fiddler, revell and dance the night throughout". There's a 17th-century reference to children in Cork being taught the Irish fiddle. When the fiddle was being mass-produced in Ireland, as opposed to more local makers, starting in Dublin with the likes of Thomas Perry (luthier), Thomas Molineux (luthier) and John Neal, they heavily based their craft on the English violin makers. Most were imported into Dublin from England. An instrument excavated during the 18th century in Dublin that was dated from the 11th century was made of dogwood with an animal carved on its tip. It was believed to have been the oldest bow in the world even though it is still unclear what instrument the bow belonged to. There may also be a reference to the Irish fiddle in the book of Leinster (ca. 1160).

The fiddling tradition of Sligo is perhaps most recognisable to outsiders, due to the popularity of American-based performers like Michael Coleman, James Morrison and Paddy Killoran. These fiddlers did much to popularise Irish music in the United States in the 1920s and 1930s. Other Sligo fiddlers included Martin Wynne and Fred Finn.

Notable fiddlers from Clare include Mary Custy, Paddy Canny, Patrick Kelly, Peadar O'Loughlin, and Martin Hayes.

Donegal has produced James Byrne, John Doherty, and Tommy Peoples.

Sliabh Luachra, a small area between Counties Kerry and Cork, is known for Julia Clifford, her brother Denis Murphy, Sean McGuire, Paddy Cronin and Padraig O'Keeffe. Contemporary fiddlers from Sliabh Luachra include Matt Cranitch and Connie O'Connell.

Modern performers include Kevin Burke, Máire Breatnach, Matt Cranitch, Paddy Cronin, Frankie Gavin, Paddy Glackin, Cathal Hayden, Martin Hayes, Peter Horan, Sean Keane, Mairéad Ní Mhaonaigh, Máiréad Nesbitt, Gerry O'Connor, Caoimhín Ó Raghallaigh, Dónal O'Connor and Paul O'Shaughnessy.

There have been many notable fiddlers from United States such as Winifred Horan, Brian Conway, Liz Carroll, and Eileen Ivers.

=== Flute and whistle ===
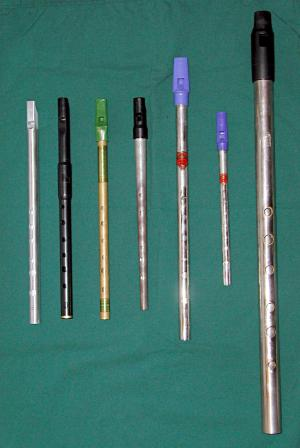
Tin whistles, and a low whistle (right), in a variety of makes and keys

The flute has been an integral part of Irish traditional music since roughly the middle of the 19th century, when art musicians largely abandoned the wooden simple-system flute (having a conical bore, and fewer keys) for the metal Boehm system flutes of present-day classical music. Factory-made whistles started to be manufactured in Manchester in 1840, and the Feadóg Irish tin whistle was the most popular mass-produced model in Ireland.

Although the choice of the Albert-system, wooden flute over the metal, was initially driven by the fact that being "outdated" castoffs, the old flutes were available cheaply second-hand. The wooden instrument has a distinct sound and continues to be commonly preferred by traditional musicians to this day. A number of players—Joanie Madden being perhaps the best known—use the Western concert flute, but many others find that the simple system flute best suits traditional fluting. Original flutes from the pre-Boehm era continue in use, but since the 1960s a number of craftspeople have revived the art of wooden flute making. Some flutes are even made of PVC; these are especially popular with new learners and as travelling instruments, being both less expensive than wooden instruments and far more resistant to changes in humidity.

A (keyless) Irish flute

The tin whistle or metal whistle, which with its nearly identical fingering might be called a cousin of the simple-system flute, is also popular. It was mass-produced in 19th century Manchester England, as an inexpensive instrument. Clarke whistles almost identical to the first ones made by that company are still available, although the original version, pitched in C, has mostly been replaced for traditional music by whistles pitched in D, the "basic key" of traditional music. The other common design consists of a barrel made of seamless tubing fitted into a plastic or wooden mouthpiece.

Skilled craftspeople make custom whistles from a range of materials including not only aluminium, brass, and steel tubing but synthetic materials and tropical hardwoods. Despite this, more than a few longtime professionals stick with ordinary factory made whistles.

Galway musicians playing at a session where tin whistle is prominent.

Irish schoolchildren are generally taught the rudiments of playing on the tin whistle, just as school children in many other countries are taught the soprano recorder. At one time the whistle was thought of by many traditional musicians as merely a sort of "beginner's flute", but that attitude has disappeared in the face of talented whistlers such as Mary Bergin, whose classic early seventies recording Feadóga Stáin (with bouzouki accompaniment by Alec Finn) is often credited with revolutionising the whistle's place in the tradition.

The low whistle, a derivative of the common tin whistle, is also popular, although some musicians find it less agile for session playing than the flute or the ordinary D whistle.

Notable present-day flute-players (sometimes called 'flautists' or 'fluters') include Matt Molloy, Kevin Crawford, Peter Horan, Michael McGoldrick, Desi Wilkinson, Conal O'Grada, James Carty, Emer Mayock, Joanie Madden, Michael Tubridy and Catherine McEvoy, while whistlers include Paddy Moloney, Carmel Gunning, Paddy Keenan, Seán Ryan, Andrea Corr, Mary Bergin, Packie Byrne and Cormac Breatnach.

=== Uilleann pipes ===
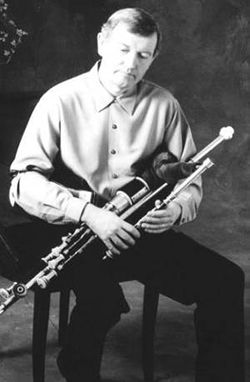
Liam O'Flynn playing uilleann pipes

Uilleann pipes (pronounced ill-in or ill-yun) are a complex instrument. Tradition holds that seven years learning, seven years practising and seven years playing is required before a piper could be said to have mastered his instrument. The uilleann pipes developed around the beginning of the 18th century, the history of which is depicted in carvings and pictures from contemporary sources in both Britain and Ireland as pastoral and union pipes. Its modern form had arrived by the end of the 18th century, and was played by gentlemen pipers such as the mid-18th century piper Jackson from Limerick and the Tandragee pipemaker William Kennedy, the Anglican clergyman Canon James Goodman (1828–1896) and his friend John Hingston from Skibbereen. These were followed in the 20th century by the likes of Séamus Ennis, Leo Rowsome and Willie Clancy, playing refined and ornate pieces, as well as showy, ornamented forms played by travelling pipers like John Cash and Johnny Doran. The uilleann piping tradition had nearly died before being re-popularized by the likes of Paddy Moloney (of the Chieftains), and the formation of Na Píobairí Uilleann, an organisation open to pipers that included such players as Rowsome and Ennis, as well as researcher and collector Breandán Breathnach. Liam O'Flynn is one of the most popular of modern performers along with Paddy Keenan, Davy Spillane, Jerry O'Sullivan, and Mick O'Brien. Many Pavee (Traveller) families, such as the Fureys and Dorans and Keenans, are famous for the pipers among them.

Uilleann pipes are among the most complex forms of bagpipes; they possess a chanter with a double reed and a two-octave range, three single-reed drones, and, in the complete version known as a full set, a trio of (regulators) all with double reeds and keys worked by the piper's forearm, capable of providing harmonic support for the melody. (Virtually all uilleann pipers begin playing with a half set, lacking the regulators and consisting of only bellows, bag, chanter, and drones. Some choose never to play the full set, and many make little use of the regulators.) The bag is filled with air by a bellows held between the piper's elbow and side, rather than by the performer's lungs as in the highland pipes and almost all other forms of bagpipe, aside from the Scottish smallpipes, Pastoral pipes (which also plays with regulators), the Northumbrian pipes of northern England, and the Border pipes found in both parts of the Anglo-Scottish Border country.

The uilleann pipes play a prominent part in a form of instrumental music called Fonn Mall, closely related to unaccompanied singing an sean nós ("in the old style"). Willie Clancy, Leo Rowsome, and Garret Barry were among the many pipers famous in their day; Paddy Keenan and Davy Spillane play these traditional airs today, among many others.

=== Harp ===
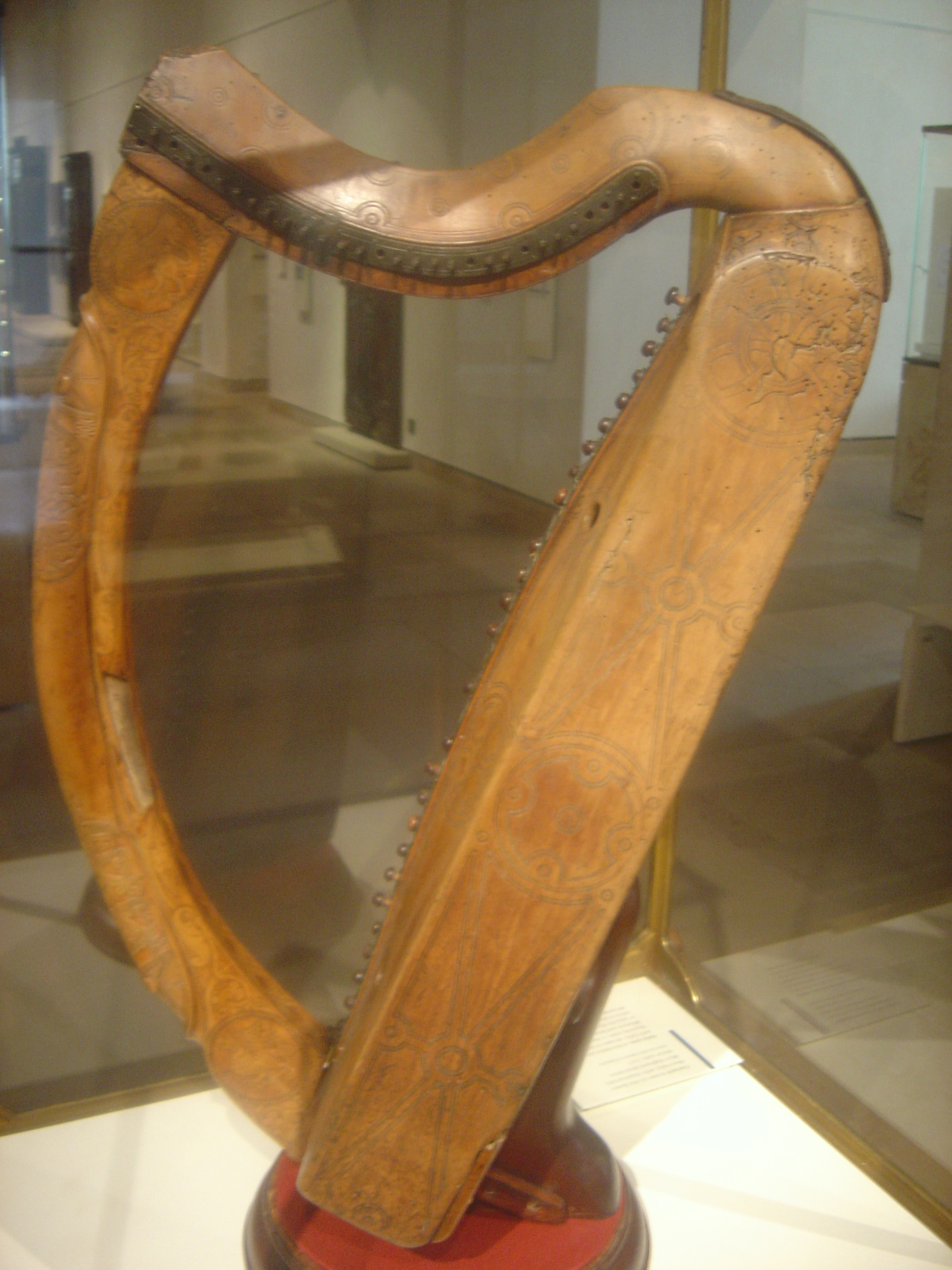
A medieval clarsach in the National Museum of Scotland in Edinburgh

The harp is among the chief symbols of Ireland. The Celtic harp, seen on Irish coinage and used in Guinness advertising, was played as long ago as the 10th century. In ancient times, the harpers were greatly respected and, along with poets and scribes, assigned a high place amongst the most significant retainers of the old Gaelic order of lords and chieftains. Perhaps the best known representative of this tradition of harping today is Turlough Ó Carolan, a blind 18th century harper who is often considered the unofficial national composer of Ireland. Thomas Connellan, a slightly earlier County Sligo harper, composed such well known airs as "The Dawning of the Day"/"Raglan Road" and "Carolan's Dream".

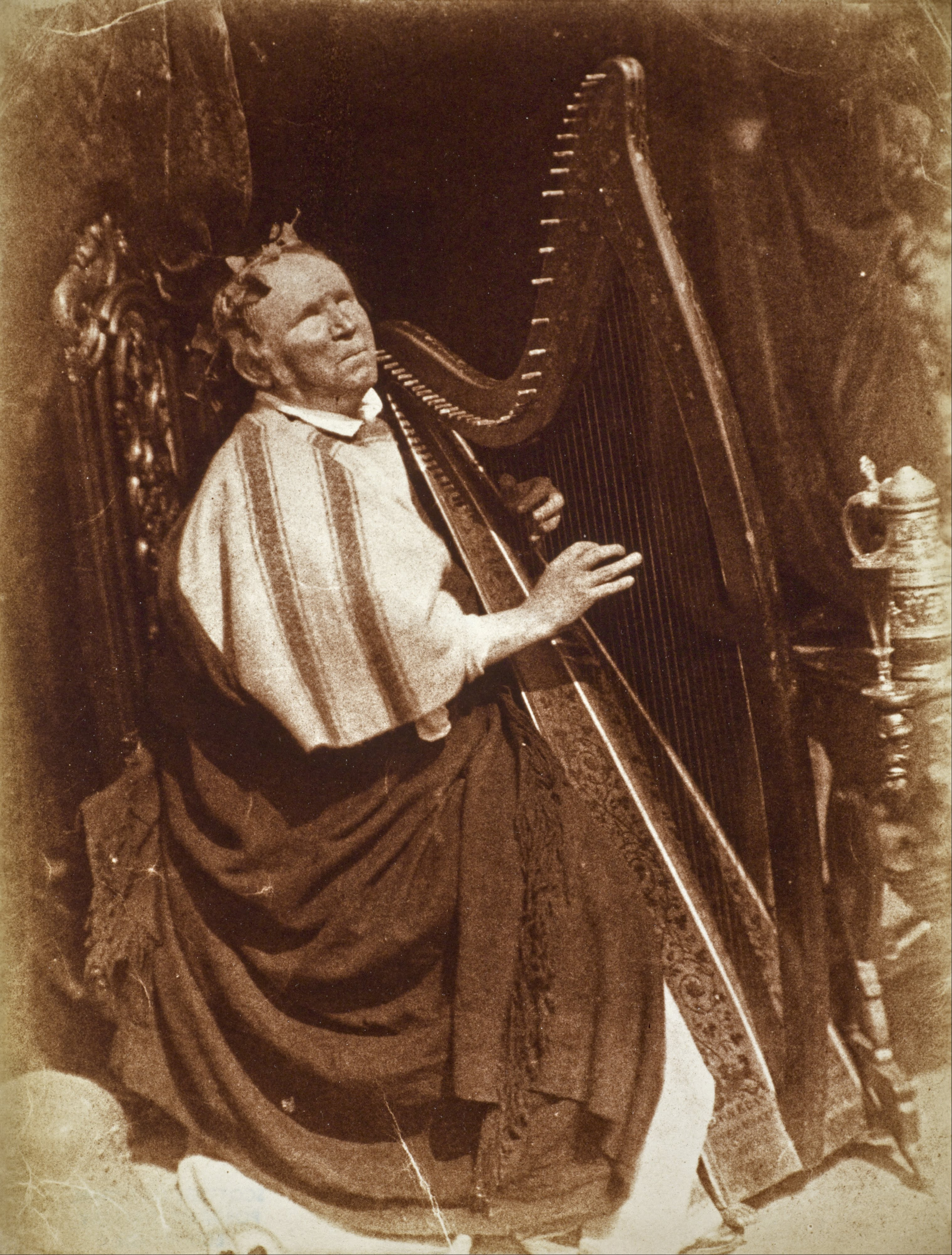
Photograph of Patrick Byrne, harper, by Hill & Adamson (1845), calotype print, 203 × 164 mm, Scottish National Gallery

The native Irish harping tradition was an aristocratic art music with its own canon and rules for arrangement and compositional structure, only tangentially associated with the folkloric music of the common people which is the ancestor of present-day Irish traditional music. Some of the late exponents of the harping tradition, such as O'Carolan, were influenced by the Italian Baroque art music of such composers as Vivaldi, which could be heard in the theatres and concert halls of Dublin. The harping tradition did not long outlast the native Gaelic aristocracy which supported it. By the early 19th century, the Irish harp and its music were, for all intents and purposes, dead. Tunes from the harping tradition survived only as unharmonised melodies which had been picked up by the folkloric tradition or were preserved as notated in collections such as Edward Bunting's (he attended the Belfast Harp Festival in 1792) in which the tunes were most often modified to make them fit for the drawing room pianofortes of the Anglicised middle and upper classes.

The first generations of 20th century revivalists mostly played the gut-strung (frequently replaced with nylon after the Second World War) neo-Celtic harp with the pads of their fingers rather than the old brass-strung harp plucked with long fingernails. They tended to take the dance tunes and song airs of Irish traditional music, along with such old harp tunes as they could find, and applied to them techniques derived from the orchestral (pedal) harp and an approach to rhythm, arrangement, and tempo that often had more in common with mainstream classical music than with either the old harping tradition or the living tradition of Irish music. A separate Belfast tradition of harp-accompanied folk-singing was preserved by the McPeake Family. In present day, a revival of the early Irish harp has been growing, with replicas of the medieval instruments being played, using strings of brass, silver, and even gold. This revival grew through the work of a number of musicians including Arnold Dolmetsch in 1930s England, Alan Stivell in 1960s Brittany, and Ann Heymann in the US from the 1970s to the present. In 2019, Irish harping was inscribed on the Representative List of the Intangible Cultural Heritage of Humanity by UNESCO, recognizing its cultural importance.

Notable players of the modern harp include Derek Bell (of the Chieftains), Laoise Kelly (of the Bumblebees), Gráinne Hambly, Máire Ní Chathasaigh, Mary O'Hara, Antoinette McKenna, Áine Minogue, and Patrick Ball.

However, the harp continues to occupy a niche in Irish traditional music, mainly for solo instrumental performance, or as the only accompaniment for an individual singer. Its melodic foreground role and background accompaniment role as a plucked or strummed string instrument has been subsumed by guitar, mandolin, and Irish bouzouki, etc., in ensemble performance.

=== Accordion and concertina ===
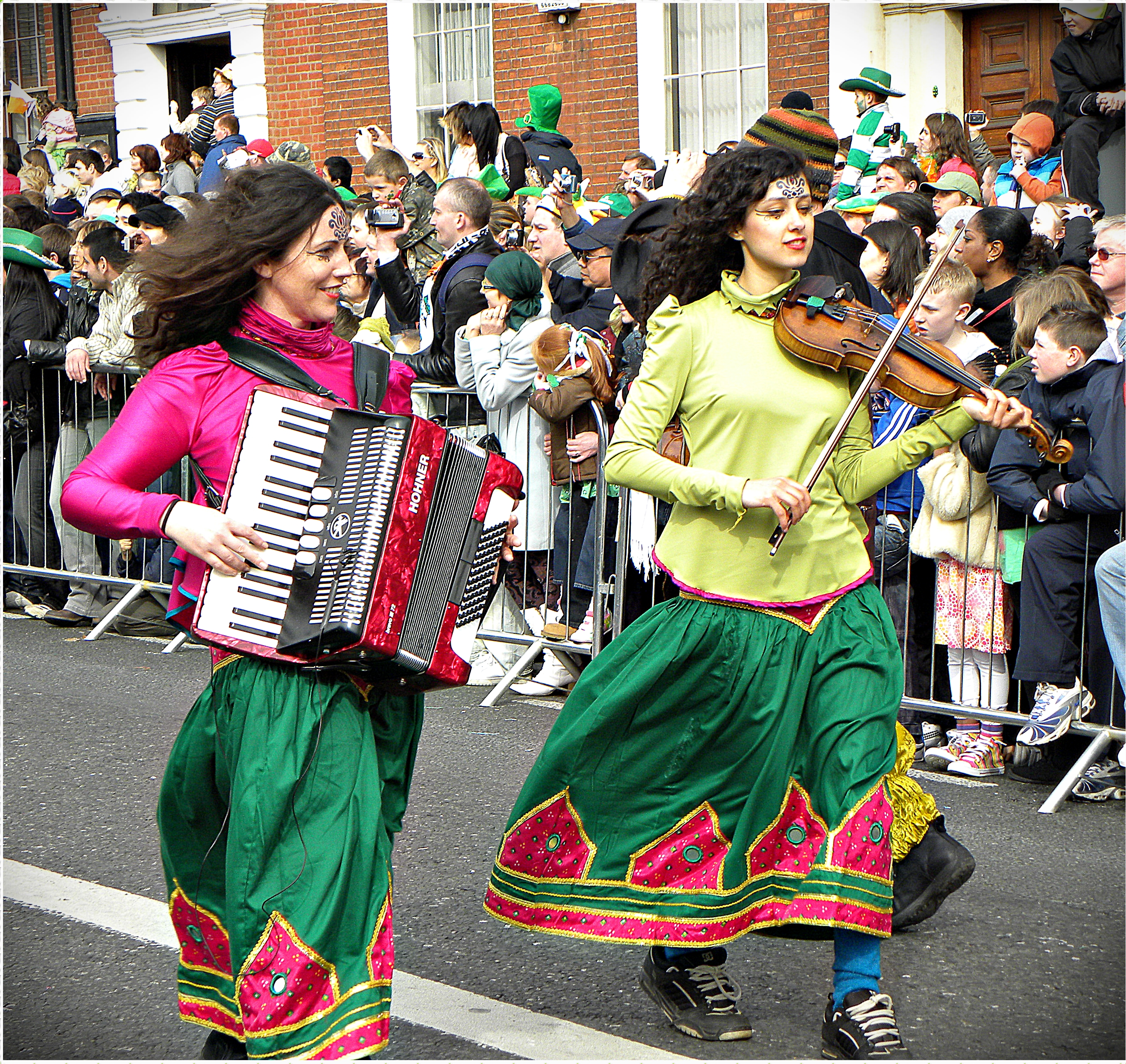
A girl playing an accordion on Saint Patrick's Day in Dublin, 2010

The accordion plays a major part in modern Irish music. The accordion spread to Ireland late in the 19th century. In its ten-key form (melodeon), it is claimed that it was popular across the island. It was recorded in the US by John Kimmel, The Flanagan Brothers, Eddie Herborn and Peter Conlon. While uncommon, the melodeon is still played in some parts of Ireland, in particular in Connemara by Johnny Connolly.

Modern Irish accordion players generally prefer the 2 row button accordion. Unlike similar accordions used in other European and American music traditions, the rows are tuned a semi-tone apart. This allows the instrument to be played chromatically in melody. Currently accordions tuned to the keys of B/C and C#/D are by far the most popular systems.

The B/C accordion lends itself to a flowing style; it was popularised by Paddy O'Brien of County Tipperary in the late 1940s and 1950s, Joe Burke and Sonny Brogan in the 1950s and 60s. Dublin native James Keane brought the instrument to New York where he maintained an influential recording and performing career from the 1970s to the present. Other famous B/C players include Paddy O'Brien of County Offaly, Bobby Gardiner, Finbarr Dwyer, John Nolan, James Keane, and Billy McComiskey.

The C#/D accordion lends itself to a punchier style and is particularly popular in the slides and polkas of Kerry Music. Notable players include Tony MacMahon, Máirtín O'Connor, Sharon Shannon, Charlie Piggott, Jackie Daly, Joe Cooley and Johnny O'Leary.

The piano accordion became popular in céilí bands and old time Irish dance music during the 1950s. Their greater range, ease of changing key, more fluent action, along with their strong musette tuning blended well with the other instruments and were highly valued during this period. They are a mainstay of some of the Irish and Scottish ceilidh bands. Players associated with the instrument include Dermot O'Brien, Malachy Doris, Sean Quinn and Mick Foster. Since the late 1970s, some players have used drier tuning and more varied bass rhythms. Karen Tweed (England) and Alan Kelly (Roscommon) are among the players associated with this style.

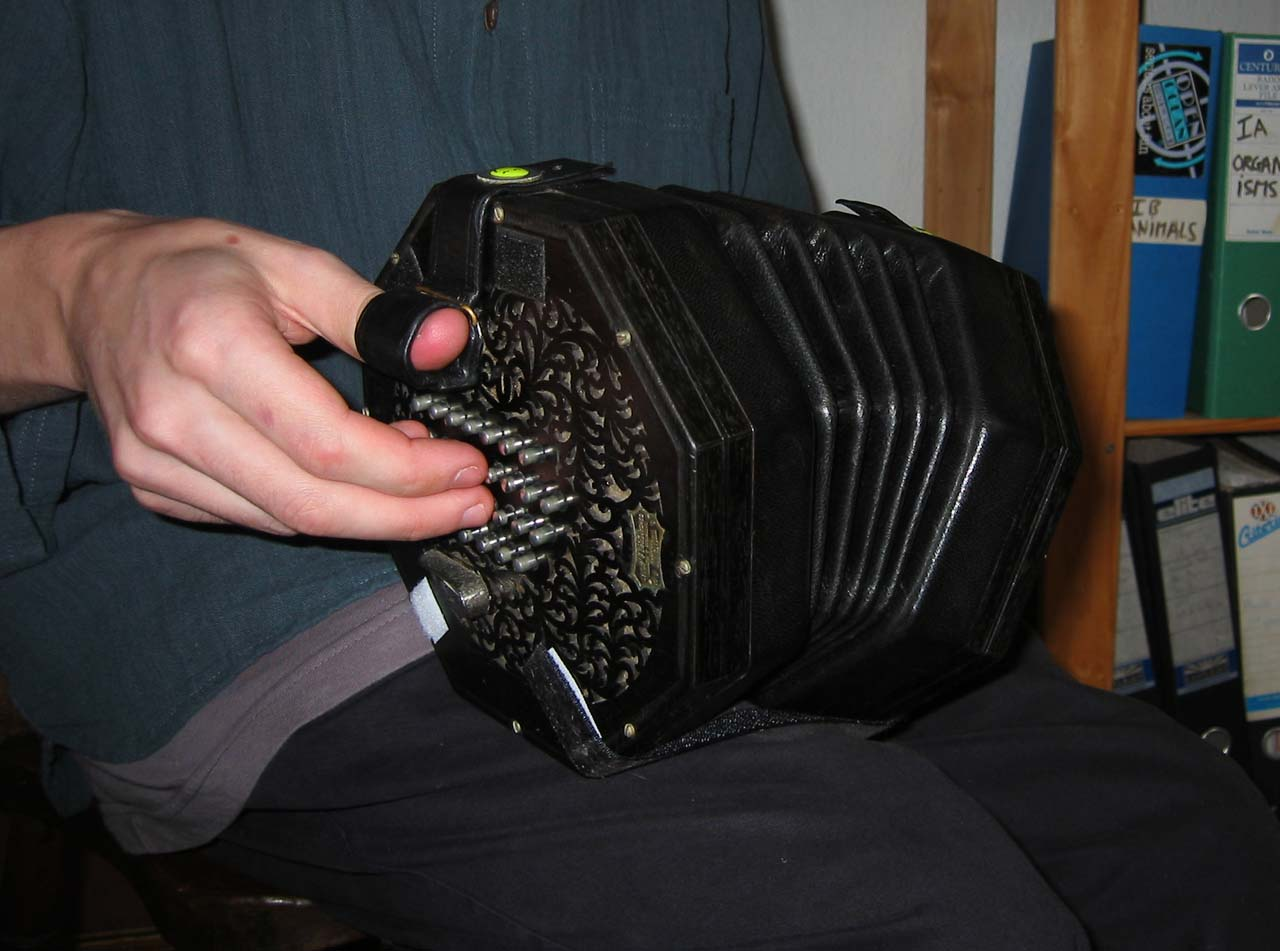
English concertina made by Wheatstone around 1920

Concertinas are manufactured in several types, the most common in Irish traditional music being the Anglo system with a few musicians now playing the English system. Each differs from the other in construction and playing technique. The most distinctive characteristic of the Anglo system is that each button sounds a different note, depending on whether the bellows are compressed or expanded. Anglo concertinas typically have either two or three rows of buttons that sound notes, plus an "air button" located near the right thumb that allows the player to fill or empty the bellows without sounding a note.

Two-row Anglo concertinas usually have 20 buttons that sound notes. Each row of 10 buttons comprises notes within a common key. The two primary rows thus contain the notes of two musical keys, such as C and G. Each row is divided in two with five buttons playing lower-pitched notes of the given key on the left-hand end of the instrument and five buttons playing the higher pitched notes on the right-hand end. The row of buttons in the higher key is closer to the wrist of each hand. 20 key concertinas have a limited use for Irish traditional music due to the limited range of accidentals available.

Three-row concertinas add a third row of accidentals (i.e., sharps and flats not included in the keys represented by the two main rows) and redundant notes (i.e., notes that duplicate those in the main keys but are located in the third, outermost row) that enable the instrument to be played in virtually any key. A series of sequential notes can be played in the home-key rows by depressing a button, compressing the bellows, depressing the same button and extending the bellows, moving to the next button and repeating the process, and so on. A consequence of this arrangement is that the player often encounters occasions requiring a change in bellows direction, which produces a clear separation between the sounds of the two adjacent notes. This tends to give the music a more punctuated, bouncy sound that can be especially well suited to hornpipes or jigs.

English concertinas, by contrast, sound the same note for any given button, irrespective of the direction of bellows travel. Thus, any note can be played while the bellows is either expanded or compressed. As a consequence, sequential notes can be played without altering the bellows direction. This allows sequences of notes to be played in a smooth, continuous stream without the interruption of changing bellows direction.

Despite the inherent bounciness of the Anglo and the inherent smoothness of the English concertina systems, skilled players of Irish traditional music can achieve either effect on each type of instrument by adapting the playing style. On the Anglo, for example, the notes on various rows partially overlap and the third row contains additional redundant notes, so that the same note can be sounded with more than one button. Often, whereas one button will sound a given note on bellows compression, an alternative button in a different row will sound the same note on bellows expansion. Thus, by playing across the rows, the player can avoid changes in bellows direction from note to note where the musical objective is a smoother sound. Likewise, the English system accommodates playing styles that counteract its inherent smoothness and continuity between notes. Specifically, when the music calls for it, the player can choose to reverse bellows direction, causing sequential notes to be more distinctly articulated.

Popular concertina players include Mohsen Amini, Niall Vallely, Kitty Hayes, Gearóid Ó hAllmhuráin, Noel Hill and Padraig Rynne. Liam Clancy (of the Clancy Brothers and Makem and Clancy) also played the concertina until his death in 2009.

=== Banjo ===
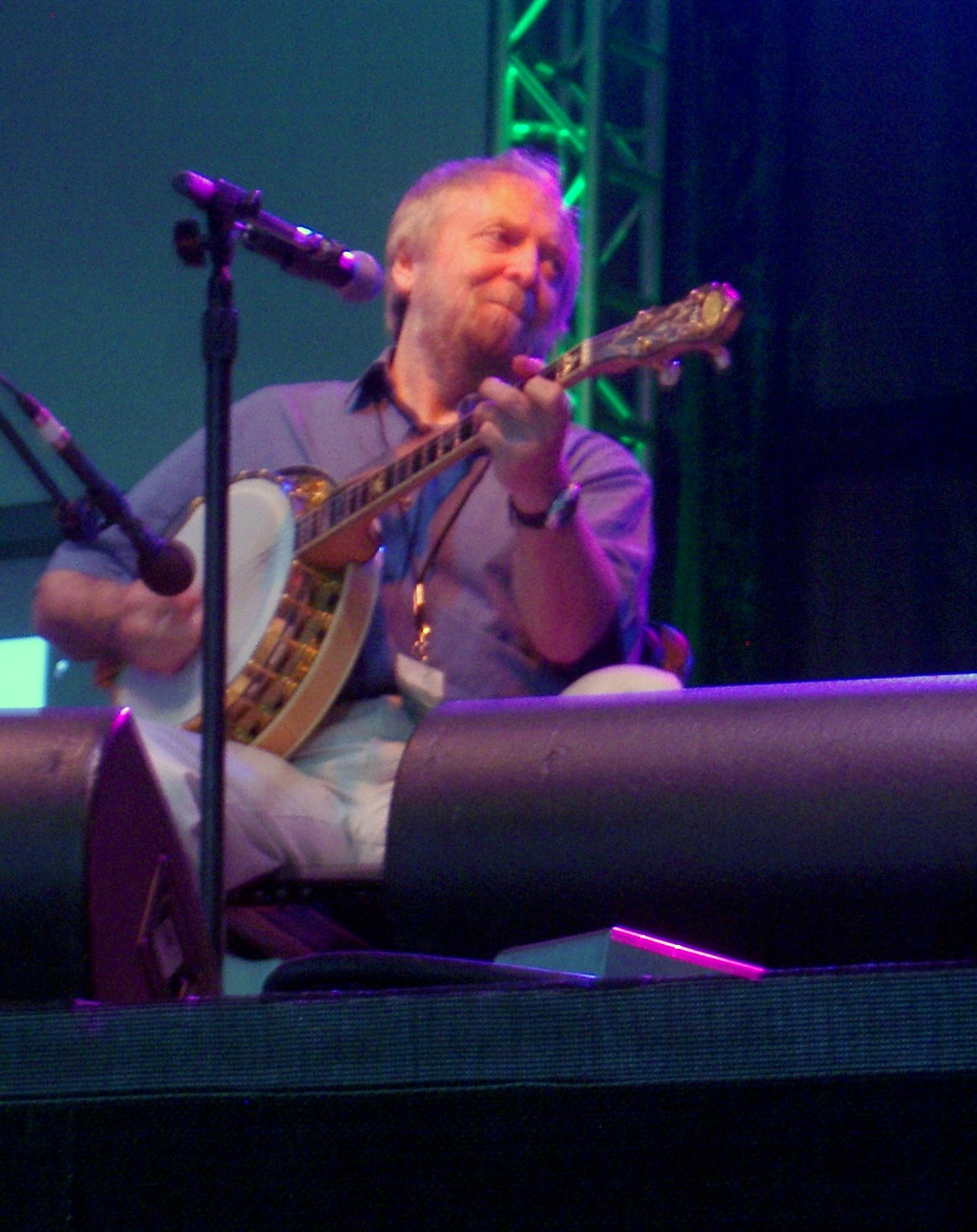
Banjo being played by Mick Moloney

The four-string tenor banjo is played as a melody instrument by Irish traditional players, and is commonly tuned GDAE, an octave below the fiddle. It was brought to Ireland by returned emigrants from the United States, where it had been developed by African slaves. It is seldom strummed in Irish music (although older recordings will sometimes feature the banjo used as a backing instrument), instead being played as a melody instrument using either a plectrum or a "thimble".

Barney McKenna of the Dubliners is often credited with paving the way for the banjo's current popularity, and actively played until his death in 2012, aged 72. Notable players include Kieran Hanrahan, Charlie Piggott, John Carty, Angelina Carberry, Gerry O'Connor, Enda Scahill, Kevin Griffin and All Ireland Fleadh champion, Brian Scannell.

With a few exceptions, for example Tom Hanway, the five-string banjo has had little role in Irish traditional music as a melody instrument. It has been used for accompaniment by the singers Margaret Barry, Pecker Dunne, Luke Kelly, Al O'Donnell, Bobby Clancy and Tommy Makem.

=== Mandolin ===
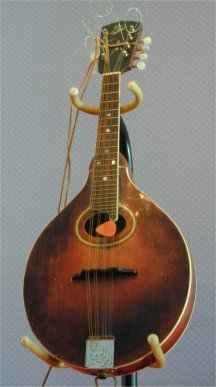
Example of an A-4-style mandolin (oval hole)

The mandolin has become a common instrument amongst Irish traditional musicians. Fiddle tunes are readily accessible to the mandolin player because of the equivalent range of the two instruments and the practically identical (allowing for the lack of frets on the fiddle) left hand fingerings.

Although almost any variety of acoustic mandolin might be adequate for Irish traditional music, virtually all Irish players prefer flat-backed instruments with oval sound holes to the Italian-style bowl-back mandolins or the carved-top mandolins with f-holes favoured by bluegrass mandolinists. The former are often too soft-toned to hold their own in a session (as well as having a tendency to not stay in place on the player's lap), whilst the latter tend to sound harsh and overbearing to the traditional ear. Greatly preferred for formal performance and recording are flat-topped "Irish-style" mandolins (reminiscent of the WWI-era Martin Army-Navy mandolin) and carved (arch) top mandolins with oval soundholes, such as the Gibson A-style of the 1920s. Resonator mandolins such as the RM-1 from National Resophonic are beginning to show up in Irish sessions in the US because they are loud enough to easily be heard.

Noteworthy Irish mandolinists include Andy Irvine (who, like Johnny Moynihan, almost always tunes the E down to D), Mick Moloney, Paul Kelly, Declan Corey and Claudine Langille. John Sheahan and Barney McKenna, fiddle player and tenor banjo player respectively, with the Dubliners are also accomplished mandolin players.

=== Guitar ===
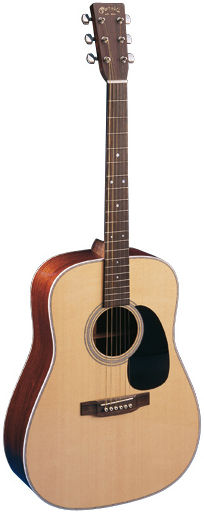
Acoustic guitar

The guitar is not traditional in Irish music but has become widely accepted in modern sessions. These are usually strummed with a plectrum (pick) to provide backing for the melody players or, sometimes, a singer. Irish backing tends to use chord voicings up and down the neck, rather than basic first or second position "cowboy chords"; unlike those used in jazz, these chord voicings seldom involve barre fingerings and often employ one or more open strings in combination with strings stopped at the fifth or higher frets. Modal (root and fifth without the third, neither major nor minor) chords are used extensively alongside the usual major and minor chords, as are suspended and sometimes more exotic augmented chords; however, the major and minor seventh chords are less employed than in many other styles of music.

Ideally, the guitarist follows the leading melody player or singer precisely rather than trying to control the rhythm and tempo. Most guitar parts take inspiration and direction from the melody, rather than driving the melody as in other acoustic genres.

Many of the earliest notable guitarists working in traditional music, such as Dáithí Sproule and The Bothy Band's Mícheál Ó Domhnaill, tuned their instruments in "DADGAD" tuning. Many other players including Steve Cooney, Arty McGlynn and John Doyle use the "standard" (EADGBE) and "drop D" (DADGBE) tunings. A host of other alternative tunings are also used by some players. The distinctive feature of these tunings is that one or more open strings played along with fingered chord shapings provide a drone note part of the chord.

Guitarists and bouzouki players may play single note melody instead of harmonizing accompaniment, but in live acoustic sessions with more than two or three players it is difficult to produce sufficient volume to be heard over drumming and the piercing sound of fiddles and penny whistles.

=== Bouzouki ===
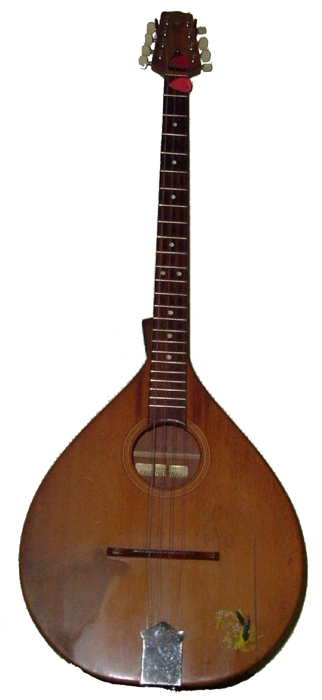
An Irish bouzouki

Although not traditional, the Irish bouzouki has found a home in the modern Irish traditional music scene. The Greek bouzouki was introduced to Irish traditional music in the late 1960s by Johnny Moynihan and then popularised by Dónal Lunny, Andy Irvine, and Alec Finn.

Today's Irish bouzouki (usually) has four courses of two strings (usually) tuned G2−D3−A3−D4. The bass courses are most often tuned in unisons, one feature that distinguishes the Irish bouzouki from its Greek antecedent, although octaves in the bass are favoured by some players. Instead of the staved round back of the Greek bouzouki, Irish bouzoukis usually have a flat or lightly arched back. Peter Abnett, the first instrument maker to build an Irish bouzouki (for Dónal Lunny in 1970) makes a three piece staved back. The top is either flat or carved like that of an arch-top guitar or mandolin, although some builders carve both the back and the top.

Alec Finn and Mick Conneely are the only notable players still using a Greek bouzouki: one of the older style trixordo three course (six string) instruments tuned D3−A3−D4.

=== Bodhrán and other percussion ===
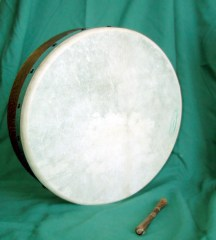
Bodhrán with tipper

A frame drum, usually of bent wood and goatskin, the bodhrán is considered a relatively modern addition to traditional dance music. Some musicologists suggest its use was originally confined to the wrenboys on Saint Stephen's Day and other quasi-ritual processions. It was introduced/popularised in the 1960s by Seán Ó Riada (although there are mentions of "tambourines" without zils being played as early as the mid 19th century), and quickly became popular. Notable players include Liam Ó Maonlaí (of the Hothouse Flowers), Johnny 'Ringo' McDonagh, Tommy Hayes, Eamon Murray of Beoga, Colm Murphy, John Joe Kelly of Flook and Caroline Corr of the Corrs.

Mention should also be made here of the Bones – two slender, curved pieces of bone or wood – and "spoons". Pairs of either are held together in one hand and struck-together rhythmically to make a percussive, clacking sound.

Occasionally, at pub sessions, there are some non-traditional hand drums used, such as the West African Djembe drum – which can produce a low booming bass note, as well as a high pitched tone – and the Caribbean Bongo drum. These drums are used as a variation to, or combined with, the bodhrán during sessions.

=== Harmonica ===
Although not as well-documented within the tradition as other free-reed instruments, the Irish harmonica tradition is represented by Rick Epping, Mick Kinsella, Paul Moran, the Murphy family from County Wexford, Eddie Clarke and Brendan Power (the latter being of New Zealand). Paddy Clancy became the first world-famous Irish folk harmonicist in the early 1960s as part of the Clancy Brothers and Tommy Makem.

== Revivals of traditional Irish music ==
=== Late 19th century revival and the early 20th century ===
The revival of interest in Irish traditional culture was closely linked to Nationalist calls for independence and was catalysed by the foundation of the Gaelic League in 1893. This sought to encourage the rediscovery and affirmation of Irish traditional arts by focusing upon the Irish language, but also established an annual competition, the Feis Ceoil, in 1903 as a focus for its activities.

In the US, traditional musicians remained popular in Irish communities in large cities such as Chicago. Chicago was a major destination for Irish immigrants. By 1920, the region had around 220,000 Irish born residents, with more than 57,000 living in the city. Francis O'Neill (1848–1936) was a collector and promoter of Irish traditional music whose work was a "huge influence on the evolution of Irish traditional dance music in the twentieth century". As well as publishing large compendiums of tunes, O'Neill is credited with making some of the earliest recordings of Irish Musicians on Edison wax cylinders. In the 1920s and 1930s the records of emigrant musicians such as Ed Reavy, Michael Coleman, James Morrison and John McKenna breathed new life into music being played back in Ireland.

Religion also played a role in the re-development of Irish culture. The actual achievement of independence from Britain tallied closely with a new Irish establishment desire to separate Irish culture from the European mainstream, but the new Irish government also paid heed to clerical calls to curtail 'jazz dancing' and other suggestions of a dereliction in Irish morality—though it was not until 1935 that the Public Dance Halls Act curtailed the right of anyone to hold their own events. From then on, no public musical or dancing events could be held in a public space without a license and most of those were usually only granted to 'suitable' persons – often the parish priest.

Danny Boy interpreted by Ernestine Schumann-Heink (1861–1936) in 1917.

Combined with continued emigration, and the priesthood's inevitable zeal in closing down un-licensed events, the upshot was to drive traditional music and dancing back into the cottage where it remained until returning migrants persuaded pub owners to host sessions in the early 1960s.

=== Second revival in the 1960s and 1970s ===
An important figure in the second revival of Irish traditional music was Seán Ó Riada, a classically trained composer who helped lead Irish music to a wider audience in the 1950s and 1960s. He was among the first to present Irish traditional music in a concert setting and to incorporate it with orchestral compositions. His composition Mise Eire introduced Irish music to new audiences in a modern context.Seán Ó Riada's the Chieftains, the Clancy Brothers, the Irish Rovers, the Dubliners and Sweeney's Men were in large part responsible for a second wave of revitalisation of Irish folk music in the 1960s, followed by Planxty, the Bothy Band and Clannad in the 70s. This revival was aided in part by a loose movement of musicians founded in 1951 with the aim of preserving traditional music, Comhaltas Ceoltóirí Éireann, which led to the popular Fleadh Cheoil (music festival).

The 1960s saw a number of innovative performers. Christy Moore and Dónal Lunny, for example, first performing as a duo, and later creating two of the best-known bands of the era, Planxty and Moving Hearts (in the 1980s). The Clancys broke open the field in the US in the early part of the decade, which inspired vocal groups like the Dubliners, while Ceoltóirí Chualann's instrumental music spawned perhaps the best-known Irish traditional band, the Chieftains, which formed in 1963.

By the 1970s, Planxty and Clannad set the stage for a major popular blossoming of Irish music. Formed in 1974, The Bothy Band became the spearcarriers of that movement; their début album, 1975 (1975), inspired a legion of fans. New groups that appeared in their wake included Moving Hearts formed by Dónal Lunny and Christy Moore and featuring Davy Spillane on uilleann pipes – the first time this had effectively happened in a rock setting. The Folk Music Society of Ireland was founded in 1971, and the Irish Traditional Music Archive was set up in 1987.

Van Morrison is also known from the trad-rock scene, and is known for incorporating soul and R&B.

=== Celtic rock ===
Celtic rock is a genre of folk rock and a form of Celtic fusion pioneered in Ireland which incorporates Celtic music, instrumentation and themes into a rock music context. It can be seen as a key foundation of the development of highly successful mainstream Celtic bands and popular musical performers, as well as creating important derivatives through further fusions. Perhaps the most successful product of this scene was the band Thin Lizzy. Formed in 1969 their first two albums were recognisably influenced by traditional Irish music and their first hit single 'Whiskey in the Jar' in 1972, was a rock version of a traditional Irish song. From this point they began to move towards the hard rock that allowed them to gain a series of hit singles and albums, but retained some occasional elements of Celtic rock on later albums such as Jailbreak (1976). Formed in 1970 Horslips were the first Irish group to have the terms 'Celtic rock' applied to them, produced work that included traditional Irish/Celtic music and instrumentation, Celtic themes and imagery, concept albums based on Irish mythology in a way that entered the territory of progressive rock all powered by a hard rock sound. Horslips are considered important in the history of Irish rock as they were the first major band to enjoy success without having to leave their native country and can be seen as providing a template for Celtic rock in Ireland and elsewhere.

=== Late 20th century: Folk-rock and more ===
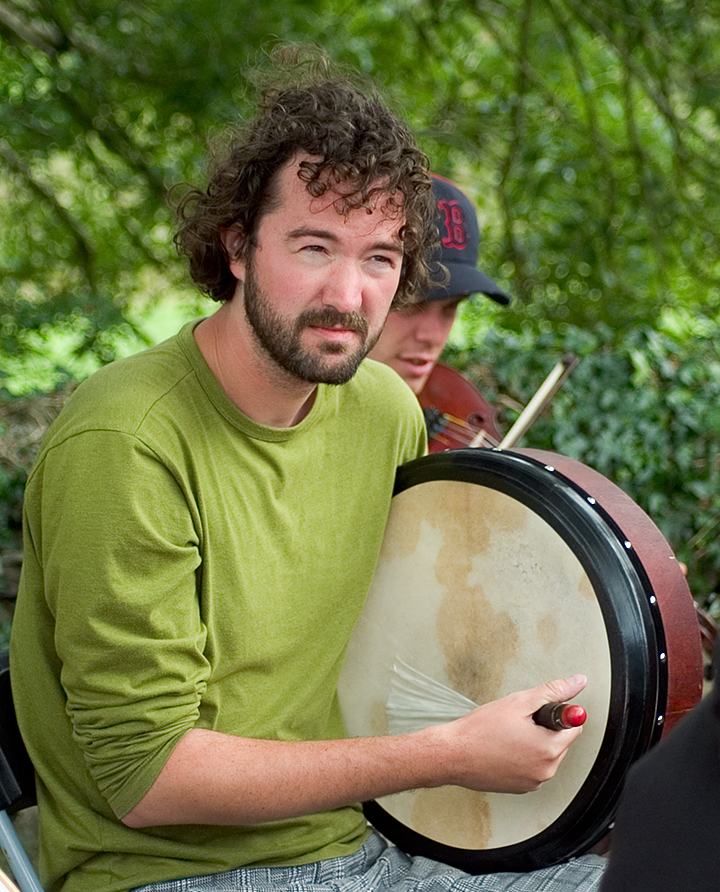
A modern bodhrán player

Traditional music, especially sean nós singing, played a major part in Irish popular music later in the century, with Van Morrison, Hothouse Flowers and Sinéad O'Connor using traditional elements in popular songs. Enya achieved enormous international success with New Age/Celtic fusions. the Pogues, led by Shane MacGowan, helped fuse Irish folk with punk rock. This resulted in top ten hits in Ireland, the UK and the US. Afro-Celt Sound System combined Celtic instrumentals with West African influences and drum and bass in the 1990s.

In the 1980s, notable folk bands included De Dannan, Altan, Dervish and Patrick Street. A growing interest in Irish music at this time helped many artistes gain more recognition abroad, including Mary Black, and Sharon Shannon. The BBC screened a documentary series about the influence of Irish music called Bringing it all Back Home (a reference to both the Bob Dylan album and the way in which Irish traditional music has travelled, especially in the New World following the Irish diaspora, which in turn has come back to influence modern Irish rock music). This series also helped to raise the profile of many artists relatively little known outside Ireland.

In the 2000s Beoga, Gráda, Danú and Teada are among the youngest major instrumental bands of a largely traditional bent.

There are many other Irish bands developing fusions of local and Irish music such as Flook, Kíla, Gráda and The Dave Munnelly Band.

== Collections ==
Irish harmonica tune
Recording from the Library of Congress' California Gold: Northern California Folk Music from the Thirties Collection; performed by Aaron Morgan (harmonica) on 17 July 1939 in Columbia, California

Several organisations are involved in collecting and promoting traditional Irish music. These include Comhaltas Ceoltóirí Éireann, the Folk Music Society of Ireland, Irish Traditional Music Archive, and Irish World Academy of Music and Dance (University of Limerick).

Regionally focused organisations include the Ionad Cultúrtha, a regional cultural centre for the traditional and contemporary arts, in Ballyvourney, County Cork. It also holds music and visual art events.

== Pub sessions ==
Pub sessions are now the home for much of Irish traditional music, which takes place at informal gatherings in country and urban pubs. The first known of these modern pub sessions took place in 1947 in London's Camden Town at a bar called the Devonshire Arms (although some ethnomusicologists believe that Irish immigrants in the United States may have held sessions before this); the practice was only later introduced to Ireland. By the 1960s pubs like O'Donoghues in Dublin were holding their own pub sessions.

== See also ==
- List of Irish musicians
- List of traditional musicians from County Clare
- List of All-Ireland Champions
- List of traditional Irish singers
- Traditional Gaelic music
- Irish Recorded Music Association
- Irish topics
- Irish rebel music

== Bibliography ==
- Boulton, Harold; Somervell, Arthur, eds. (1893). Songs of the Four Nations. London: J.B. Cramer & Co.
- Boydell, Barra (1985). Music and Paintings in the National Gallery of Ireland. Dublin: National Gallery of Ireland. ISBN 0-903162-22-9.
- Breathnach, Breandán (1971). Folk Music and Dances of Ireland. Ireland: Mercier Press. ISBN 0-85342-509-4.
- Carson, Ciaran (1986). Irish Traditional Music. Belfast: Appletree Press. ISBN 0-86281-168-6.
- Carson, Ciaran (1996). Last Night's Fun: A Book About Irish Traditional Music. London: Jonathan Cape. ISBN 0-224-04141-X.
- Cooper, David (2016) [First published 2009 by Ashgate]. The Musical Traditions of Northern Ireland and its Diaspora (hardcover ed.). Oxon and New York: Routledge. ISBN 978-0-7546-6230-3.
- Fleischmann, Aloys, ed. (1998). Sources of Irish Traditional Music c. 1600–1855: An Annotated Catalogue of Prints and Manuscripts, 1583–1855. New York and London: Garland Publishing. ISBN 0-8240-6948-X.
- Huntington, Gale; Herrmann, Lani; Dr Moulden, John, eds. (2010). Sam Henry's Songs of the People. Athens, GA and London: The University of Georgia Press. ISBN 978-0-8203-3625-1.
- Irvine, Andy (1988). Aiming for the Heart (1st ed.). Germany: Heupferd Musik Verlag GmbH. ISBN 3-923445-01-6.
- Irvine, Andy (2008) [First published 1988]. Aiming for the Heart: Irish Song Affairs (2nd expanded ed.). Germany: Heupferd Musik Verlag GmbH. ISBN 978-3-923445-05-9.
- Irwin, Colin (2003). In Search of the Craíc. London: André Deutsch. ISBN 0-233-00004-6.
- Joyce, Patrick Weston, Old Irish Folk Music and Songs: A Collection of 842 Irish Airs and Songs Hitherto Unpublished, London: Longmans, Green and Dublin: Hodges, Figgis, 1909 (Repr. New York: Cooper Square Publishers, 1965).
- Krassen, Miles (1976). O'Neill's Music of Ireland. New York: Oak Publications. ISBN 0-8256-0173-8.
- Moore, Christy (2000). One Voice. London: Lir/Hodder and Stoughton. ISBN 0-340-76839-8.
- Ó Callanain, Niall; Walsh, Tommy (1989). The Irish Bouzouki. Dublin: Waltons. ISBN 0-7866-1595-8.
- O'Connor, Nuala. "Dancing at the Virtual Crossroads". 2000. In: Broughton, Simon and Ellingham, Mark with McConnachie, James and Duane, Orla (ed.), World Music, Vol. 1: Africa, Europe and the Middle East, pp. 170–188. Rough Guides Ltd, Penguin Books. ISBN 1-85828-636-0
- O'Neill, Francis (compiled & edited by); O'Neill, James (arranged by) (1907). The Dance Music of Ireland: 1001 Gems. Chicago: Lyon & Healy.
- O'Neill, Francis (1913). Irish Minstrels and Musicians: With Numerous Dissertations on Related Topics. Chicago: Lyon & Healy.
- O'Sullivan, Donal (1952). Irish Folk Music And Song. Dublin: At the Sign of the Three Candles; rev. edition (1961). ASIN B0007JGCJC.
- O'Toole, Leagues (2006). The Humours of Planxty. Dublin: Hodder Headline. ISBN 0-340-83796-9.
- Petrie, George, Petrie's Complete Irish Music: 1,582 Traditional Melodies, prepared from the original manuscripts by Charles Villiers Stanford, London: Boosey & Co., 1902–05 (reprint: London: Dover Publications, 2003).
- Petrie, George, The Petrie Collection of Ancient Music of Ireland, edited by David Cooper, Cork: Cork University Press, 2002.
- Stevenson, Sir John; Moore, Thomas (c. 1820). Irish Melodies. London: Henry Russell.
- Sullivan, Anthony (1979). Sully's Irish Banjo Book. Manchester: Halshaw Music. ASIN B0000D3WE8.
- Tuohy, David; Ó hAodha, Mícheál (2008). Postcolonial Artist: Johnny Doran and Irish Traveller Tradition. Newcastle: Cambridge Scholars Publishing. ISBN 978-1-84718-441-2.
- Vallely, Fintan (1998). The Companion to Irish Traditional Music. Cork: Cork University Press. ISBN 1-85918-148-1.
- Wallis, Geoff; Wilson, Sue (2001). The Rough Guide to Irish Music. London: Rough Guides. ISBN 1-85828-642-5.
- Williamson, Robin (1976). Fiddle Tunes (English, Welsh, Scottish & Irish). New York: Oak Publications. ISBN 0-8256-0165-7.
