= Johnny O'Leary =

Irish traditional musician

Johnny O'Leary (6 June 1923 – 9 February 2004) was an Irish traditional musician from Sliabh Luachra who mainly played the button accordion .

== Early life ==
O'Leary was born in Maulykeavane, near Killarney and Ballydesmond, in the center of Sliabh Luachra.

== Musical Career ==
At the age of five, O'Leary began learning the melodeon, and by his early teens, was regularly playing for local dances. He played the Paolo Soprani box in C#/D tuning, using the "press and draw" style. He learned from Padraig O'Keeffe, as well as Denis Murphy and his sister Julia Clifford.

As a teenager, he became friends with Denis Murphy. As adults they played at Dan O'Connell's pub in Knocknagree, along with musicians such as O'Leary's daughter Ellen (on tin whistle), Kathleen O'Keefe (whistle) and Michael Duggan (fiddle). Dancing was provided by the Knocknagree Set Dancers. Murphy died 37 years after they met.

Sliabh Luachran music which influenced O'Leary is predominantly dance tunes such as polkas and slides over jigs, reels and hornpipes elsewhere in Ireland. The tunes are described to "resonate with a shrill sadness and poignant humanity." Many of Johnny O’Leary’s polkas, slides and barn-dances have little attention or coverage, though his career consisted of many recordings, radio and television appearances, and several awards His last national achievement was a TG4 Hall of Fame award.

== Legacy ==
Collector and publisher of Irish traditional music Breandán Breathnach visited Sliabh Luachra for many years and collected music from O'Leary. He intended to publish this material because he regarded O'Leary's playing as preserving the style and repertoire of the area. After Breathnach's death in 1985, Terry Moylan took up the work and published his collection of O'Leary's music in 1994. According to broadcaster Ciarán Mac Mathúna, who first met Johnny in 1955, he had a huge repertoire, with up to 1,500 tunes stored away.

A bronze life-size statue of O'Leary was unveiled in Killarney Town Centre by John O'Donoghue, the then Minister for Arts, Sports and Tourism, on 28 April 2007.

== Recordings ==
- Music from Sliabh Luachra Volume 5: Johnny O'Leary -. Music for the Set Topic /Ossian OSSCD 25 Recorded 1976–77.
- An Calmfhear/The Trooper Gael Linn CEFC 132 / CEFCD 132, 1989
- Johnny O'Leary of Sliabh Luachra: Dance Music from the Cork/Kerry Border, recorded December 1995. Craft Recordings, Dublin - CRCS01
- (with Paudie O'Connor) The County Bounds Ossian, 1999

== Bibliography ==
- Johnny O'Leary of Sliabh Luachra: Dance Music from the Cork/Kerry Border, Terry Moylan (editor) Lilliput Press, Dublin, 1994 (contains 348 of Johnny O'Leary's tunes).
- Johnny O'Leary of Sliabh Luachra: Dance Music from the Cork-Kerry Border, Terry Moylan (editor) Lilliput Press, Dublin, 2014 (second edition, contains 29 additional tunes).
