= The Star Above the Garter =

The Star Above The Garter

Studio album by Denis Murphy & Julia Clifford
- Released: 1969
- Recorded: 1969
- Venue: Dublin
- Studio: Peter Hunt Studios
- Genre: Irish traditional music
- Length: 49:49
- Label: Claddagh
- Producer: Gene Martin

Denis Murphy & Julia Clifford chronology
The Star Above The Garter (1969)	Kerry Fiddles - Music From Sliabh Luachra Vol. 1 (1977)

Professional ratings
Review scores
Source	Rating
Allmusic	5/5 stars

The Star Above The Garter is an album of Sliabh Luachra fiddle music recorded by siblings Denis Murphy (1910–1974) and Julia Clifford (1914–1997) in 1969 and is regarded as one of the classic albums of Irish traditional music.

The album was remastered and re-released by Claddagh Records in 2022.

The title of the album comes from a tune of the same name that Denis and Julia learned from their teacher, Pádraig O'Keeffe, however the tune was originally called The Star and Garter and it is believed was changed to The Star Above the Garter by Garech de Brún of Claddagh Records for the release of the album. The original name is thought to be a reference to the Order of St Patrick.

The cover art is by French artist Catherine Folâtre.

== Track listing ==
1. "Rathawaun / The Hare In The Corn" – 1:50
2. "O'Mahony's / The Stack Of Barley" – 3:00
3. "The Morning Star / Rolling On The Ryegrass" (Denis Murphy) – 2:00
4. "Farewell to Whiskey / The Dark Girl" – 2:07
5. "Tom Billy's" – 2:30
6. "Dan O'Keeffe's" – 1:50
7. "O'Rahilly's Grave" (Julia Clifford) - 2:08
8. "Seanbhean na gCártaí" – 2:07
9. "The Ballydesmond Polkas" – 2:52
10. "The Blackbird" (Denis Murphy) – 2:07
11. "The Lady On The Island / Callaghan's" – 1:42
12. "The Munster Jig / Munster Buttermilk" – 1:50
13. "Knocknabower Polkas" – 3:35
14. "Johnny When You Die / Anything For John-Joe" – 2:13
15. "An Raibh Tú ag an gCarraig" (Julia Clifford) – 1:50
16. "Pádraig O'Keeffe's / The Scartaglen Jig" – 2:15
17. "The Fisherman's" – 2:20
18. "The Galtee Rangers / The Glentaun Reel" – 1:40
19. "Caoine Uí Dhónaill" (Denis Murphy) – 3:41
20. "The Star Above The Garter / The Lisheen Slide" – 2:13

== Personnel ==
- Denis Murphy - fiddle
- Julia Clifford - fiddle
- Catherine Folâtre - artwork
- John S. Perrett - design
