= Terence Teahan =

Traditional Irish musician and composer

Terence "Cuz" Teahan (1905–1989) was a notable traditional Irish musician and composer from the Sliabh Luachra district. He played concertina, accordion and fiddle and composed songs and dance tunes.

== Life ==
Teahan was born in 1905 at Glountane in southern County Kerry, Ireland. His father died when he was very young. His mother was a popular singer, while his extended family contained many musicians who played at dances in the neighbourhood. His brother Patrick had some poetry published in local newspapers. Among his neighbours were eminent musicians Padraig O'Keeffe, who taught him music at Glountane School, and Johnny O'Leary. O'Keeffe's father, Seán, and sister Nora Carmody also taught him at that school.

In 1928 he emigrated to the United States and settled in Chicago. Over the next few years, during the Great Depression, he returned to Ireland, but set off again for Chicago in 1933. He started work with the Illinois Central Railroad in 1936 and remained with them until he retired in 1970.

From 1943 to 1964 he played concertina and button accordion three nights a week at the major Irish dance-halls in Chicago, as well as at weddings and cultural events. During this time he also toured with Roche's School of Dancing. In the 1970s he performed with Mary McDonagh (piano), Maida Sugrue (vocals) and Una McGlwe (fiddle). In 1978, in recognition of his special contributions, he was voted Irishman of the Year by the Harp and Shamrock club, Chicago. He was known for his knack of writing songs in honor of friends and musical colleagues, matching the style of the song to the subject's personality.

After he retired from Illinois Central he played in Chicago with the Dayhills Irish Band.

He received the nickname "Cuz" because he helped out newly arrived Irishmen by telling them where to find accommodation, work, etc. He would say: "Tell them I'm your cousin".

== Discography ==
- Terry Teahan and Gene Kelly: Old Time Irish Music In America, 1977, Topic 12TS352
- Irish Traditional Instrumental Music From Chicago, Volume 2, 1978, Rounder 6006 [4 tracks]
- Cuz – A Tribute to Terry 'Cuz' Teahan by Niamh Ní Charra, 2013, Imeartas Records IMCD004. Includes special guests Séamus Begley, Liz Carroll, Mick Moloney, Donal Murphy and Tommy O'Sullivan
