= Teahan =

Teahan, also spelt Teehan, is a surname from Ireland. Notable people with the surname include:

- Ciarán Teehan (born 1999), Irish darts player
- Kathleen Teahan (born 1947), American teacher and politician
- Terence Teahan (1905–1989), Irish musician and composer
