= It Was Mighty =

Volume 29 : It Was Mighty

Compilation album by Traditional Irish Musicians
- Released: 16 March 2016
- Genre: Folk
- Length: 215
- Label: Topic Records
- Producer: Tony Engle & Reg Hall

"It Was Mighty!" The Early Days of Irish Music in London (TSCD679T) is the first album in the fourth series of The Voice of the People from Topic Records and comprises three CDs. The selections are taken from Topic Records back catalogue, the Peter Kennedy archive in the British Library and many private collections.

== Introduction ==
Topic records have issued compilations in the series The Voice of the People since 1998. The compilation has been selected by Dr Reg Hall who has selected all but four of the series so far. The theme of this and its companion volume, It Was Great Altogether, is the Irish music of London.

Reg Hall in the accompanying booklet defines the London-Irish as a distinct ethnic community of settled migrants and their offspring with topping up from a constant trickle of immigrants from Ireland. On this first compilation most of the musicians were raised in Ireland with a few from London, some of whom travelled to Ireland for holidays.

== The Compiler ==
Reg Hall has been active in Irish music in London since the 1950s, having been invited by Michael Gorman to join his band in 1956. His involvement in documenting the phenomena continued when he co-produced Paddy in the Smoke with Bill Leader in 1968, recorded in "The Favourite" public house in Holloway, London. A number of other recordings followed as well as continuing to play in sessions around London.

A large number of the tracks selected feature him providing accompaniment on either piano or keyboard for the dance tunes.

== Packaging ==
The album consists of a cardboard case with a card CD holder for the three CDs and a booklet for the sleeve notes.

=== Cardboard case ===
The cardboard case does not detail the tracks in the compilation but does identify all the musicians and in the brief notes explains the place of Irish music in the lives of the migrant population in the 1950s. The notes then continue to explain that this album covers the period after the 1950s up to the present day.

=== Booklet ===
The booklet consists of 100 pages and follows a similar sequence to the other albums in the series. The booklet was written by Reg Hall, except where stated below.

- "About the Editor" – written by Tony Engle, managing director of Topic Records
- "The Voice of the People – The introduction" details the concept and philosophy of the series of compilations and then continues with a history of Irish Music in both Ireland and London.
  - "'It was Mighty!' The Early Days of Irish Music in London." The section details the quote from the musician Gabe O’Sullivan about the music of the 1950s that provides the title of the album and then goes on to detail the wealth of musicmaking in London at the time.
  - "Music and dance in Ireland before emigration"
  - "Music and dance of the 'London Irish'"
  - "Irish traditional music and dance in London after 1945"
  - "The Pubs"
  - "The Dance Halls"
  - "Comhaltas Ceoltóirí Éireann"
  - "Recordings and the Media"
  - "The Continuing Tradition of Irish music in London"
  - CD details. Detailing the content of each of the CDs with biographical notes on each of the performers in track sequence.
  - Full track list by CD.
  - "British Library", written by Dr Janet Topp Fargion (Lead Curator World and Traditional Music), gives details of the World and Traditional Music Collection and the access available through the internet. Peter Kennedy's recordings are now held within this archive.

== The Recordings ==
The three CDs cover recordings made between 1948 and 2001. These recordings were made in numerous different locations including Pubs, Stores, various flats and houses, recording studios and Cecil Sharp House the headquarters of the English Folk Dance and Song Society. Many of the tunes were recorded by people who were only involved with the music but also included many people from the British folk music world, such as Ewan MacColl, Peter Kennedy, Bill Leader, Robin Morton, Peter Bellamy and John Tams.

=== The CDs ===
==== CD1 ====
This CD features recordings made between 1948 and 1972; 10 of the tracks were recorded by Bill Leader in "The Favourite" but do not appear on Paddy in the Smoke.

Track	Title/Where recorded	Artist/Instrument	Length
1	The Jolly Tinker(Reel)	Michael Gorman(fiddle).	1:28
1	Recorded by Peter Kennedy at his flat in Belsize Park, London, 25 October 1952.		1:28
2	Bonnie Kate(Reel)	Michael Gorman(fiddle).	2:47
2	Recorded by Peter Kennedy at his flat in Belsize Park, London, 25 October 1952.		2:47
3	The Boys of Ballisadare(Reel)	Gerry Wimsey(flute).	1:36
3	Recorded by Janet Kerr in Collooney, Co. Sligo, 31 January 1972.		1:36
4	The Copperplate(Reel)	Gerry Wimsey( Clarke's tin whistle).	1:01
4	Recorded by Janet Kerr in Collooney, Co. Sligo, 31 January 1972.		1:01
5	Paddy Taylor's(Hornpipe)	Paddy Taylor(flute).	1:39
5	Recorded by Michael Daly at the Camden Stores, Camden Town, London, 1959.		1:39
6	The Cabin Hunter(Reel)	Paddy Taylor(flute).	0:55
6	Recorded by Peter Kennedy at his flat in Belsize Park, London, 2 December 1956.		0:55
7	With Kitty I'll Go(Slow Air)	Paddy Taylor(flute).	2:00
7	Recorded by Peter Kennedy at his flat in Belsize Park, London, 2 December 1956.		2:00
8	Pat Hanley's No. 1 / Pat Hanley's No. 2(Slides)	Paddy Taylor(flute).	2:32
8	Recorded by Peter Kennedy at his flat in Belsize Park, London, 2 December 1956.		2:32
9	Nan Landers’(Hornpipe)	Nan Landers(melodeon).	1:26
9	Recorded by Dick Landers at their home in Chiswick, London, probably mid-1960s.		1:26
10	Nan Landers’(Slide)	Nan Landers(melodeon).	1:14
10	Recorded by Dick Landers at their home in Chiswick, London, probably mid-1960s.		1:14
11	The Wild Irishman / The College Grove / Jenny Picking Cockles(Reels)	Jimmy Power(fiddle), Patsy Goulding(piano).	2:42
11	Recorded by Jimmy Power in London, circa 1959.		2:42
12	Doherty's(Slip Jig)	Danny McNiff(flute).	1:46
12	Recorded by Peter Kennedy & Sean O’Boyle, Belleek, Co. Fermanagh, 20 July 1952.		1:46
13	Danny McNiff's / Farewell to Whiskey(Polkas)	Danny McNiff(flute).	2:22
13	Recorded by Peter Kennedy & Sean O’Boyle, Belleek, Co. Fermanagh, 20 July 1952.		2:22
14	The Streams in the Valley(Reel)	Danny McNiff(flute).	0:56
14	Recorded by Peter Kennedy & Sean O’Boyle, Belleek, Co. Fermanagh, 20 July 1952.		0:56
15	The Beauty Spot(Reel)	Bobby Casey(fiddle).	1:18
15	Recorded by Peter Kennedy at Cecil Sharp House, London, 18 December 1956.		1:18
16	Poll Ha’penny(Hornpipe)	Bobby Casey(fiddle).	2:04
16	Recorded by Peter Kennedy at Cecil Sharp House, London, 18 December 1956.		2:04
17	Brian O’Lynn / The Maid in the Meadow(Jigs)	Bobby Casey(fiddle).	2:06
17	Recorded by Michael Daly in Pat Goulding's flat, Pimlico, London, 1957.		2:06
18	The Girl that Broke My Heart / Dick Cosgrove(Reels)	Mick Gorman (nephew)(fiddle).	1:44
18	Recorded by Bill Leader, Reg Hall & Michael Plunkett at Michael Gorman's house, Manchester, 5 July 1970.		1:44
19	The Copperplate / The Bunch of Keys(Reels)	Jimmy Hogan(accordion), Bobby Hall(piano), Brian Green(drums).	2:17
19	Recorded by Peter Kennedy at Cecil Sharp House, Camden Town, London, 8 March 1958.		2:17
20	St. Ruth's Bush / Paddy Kelly's Favourite(Reels)	Martin Byrnes(fiddle).	3:17
20	Recorded by Michael Daly in Pat Goulding's flat, Pimlico, London, 1957.		3:17
21	Wallop the Spot / The Tongs by the Fire(Jigs)	Paddy Malynn(accordion)	2:50
21	Recorded by Michael Daly at the Norwood Hotel, West Norwood, London, 7 October 1962.		2:50
22	The Red-Haired Boy(Slow Air)	Julia Clifford(fiddle).	1:15
22	Recorded by Reg Hall at Lucy & Eric Farr's house, Ladywell, London, 16 August 1964.		1:15
23	The Cliffs of Moher(Jig)	Julia Clifford(fiddle).	1:33
23	Recorded by Reg Hall at Lucy & Eric Farr's house, Ladywell, London, 16 August 1964.		1:33
24	The Cuckoo's Nest(Hornpipe)	Paddy Breen(flageolet).	1:56
24	Recorded by Peter Kennedy at Cecil Sharp House, Camden Town, London, March 1952.		1:56
25	Tralee Gaol(Polka)	Paddy Breen(flageolet).	1:30
25	Recorded by Peter Kennedy at Cecil Sharp House, Camden Town, London, March 1952.		1:30
26	The Pipe on the Hob(Jig)	Paddy Breen(flageolet).	1:10
26	Recorded by Peter Kennedy at Cecil Sharp House, Camden Town, London, March 1952.		1:10
27	Munster Buttermilk(Jig)	Bobby Casey(fiddle), Willie Clancy(uilleann pipes).	1:40
27	Recorded by Peter Kennedy at Cecil Sharp House, Camden Town, London, 18 December 1956.		1:40
28	The West Wind / Sean Reid's Fancy(Reels)	Bobby Casey(fiddle), Willie Clancy(uilleann pipes).	2:24
28	Recorded by Peter Kennedy at Cecil Sharp House, Camden Town, London, 18 December 1956.		2:24
29	The Humours of Scarriff(Reel)	Martin Byrnes(fiddle), Tony Howley(flute).	1:04
29	Recorded by Michael Daly at the Camden Stores, Camden Town, London, 1959.		1:04
30	The Galway Rambler / The London Lasses(Reels)	Martin Byrnes(fiddle), Tony Howley(flute).	2:11
30	Recorded by Michael Daly at the Camden Stores, Camden Town, London, 1959.		2:11
31	The Rose in the Heather / The Gold Ring / The Maid on the Green / Saddle the Pony(Jigs)	Martin Wynne(fiddle)	3:18
31	HMV recording studio, Oxford Street, London, probably 14 July 1948.		3:18
32	The Boys of the Lough(Reel)	Michael Gorman & Martin Wynne(fiddles), Bill Rollison(piano).	2:15
32	HMV recording studio, Oxford Street, London, probably 14 July 1948.		2:15
33	The Liffey Banks / The Shaskeen(Reels)	Jimmy Power(fiddle), Clancy(flute), Tommy Maguire(accordion), Paddy Furey(piano).	2:20
33	Recorded by Reg Hall in the Bedford Arms, Camden Town, London, 2 December 1960.		2:20
34	When We Were Drinking(Jig)	Bobby Casey(fiddle), Willie Clancy(uilleann pipes).	1:45
34	Recorded by Peter Kennedy at Cecil Sharp House, Camden Town, London, 18 December 1956.		1:45
35	The Old Bush / The Chicago(Reels)	Bobby Casey(fiddle), Willie Clancy(uilleann pipes).	2:31
35	Recorded by Peter Kennedy at Cecil Sharp House, Camden Town, London, 18 December 1956.		2:31

==== CD2 ====
This CD features recordings made between 1952 and 1974.

Track 14 features Michael Gorman playing his well-known composition, the jig The Strayaway Child.

Track	Title/Where recorded	Artist/Instrument	Length
1	The Chicago / The Green Fields of America(Reels)	Roger Sherlock(flute), Liam Farrell(mandolin).	2:33
1	Recorded by Michael Daly at the Camden Stores, Camden Town, London, 1959.		2:33
2	Limerick Lasses / Come West along the Road(Reels)	Edmond Murphy(fiddle), Mick Gorman (nephew)(flute).	2:06
2	Recorded by Michael Daly at the Camden Stores, Camden Town, London, 1959.		2:06
3	Cregg's Pipes(Reel)	Edmond Murphy(fiddle), Mick Gorman (nephew)(flute).	2:37
3	Recorded by Michael Daly at the Camden Stores, Camden Town, London, 1959.		2:37
4	Farrell Gara(Reel)	Michael Gorman(fiddle).	1:09
4	Recorded by Peter Kennedy at his flat in Belsize Park, London, 25 October 1952.		1:09
5	Miss McLeod's(Reel)	Michael Gorman(fiddle).	3:53
5	Recorded by Peter Kennedy at his flat in Belsize Park, London, 25 October 1952.		3:53
6	The Red-Haired Lad(Hornpipe)	Paddy Breen(flageolet)	0:56
6	Recorded by Peter Kennedy at Cecil Sharp House, Camden Town, London, March 1952.		0:56
7	The Orange Rogue(Set-Dance)	Paddy Breen(flageolet).	1:31
7	Recorded by Peter Kennedy at Cecil Sharp House, Camden Town, London, March 1952.		1:31
8	Rodney's Glory(Set Dance)	Paddy Breen(flageolet).	1:34
8	Recorded by Peter Kennedy at Cecil Sharp House, Camden Town, London, March 1952.		1:34
9	Green Grow the Rushes O(Fling)	Paddy Breen(flageolet).	0:59
9	Recorded by Peter Kennedy at Cecil Sharp House, Camden Town, London, March 1952.		0:59
10	Katie's Reel	Paddy Breen(lilting) .	1:01
10	Recorded by Bill Leader & Reg Hall at Bill Leader's flat, Camden Town, London, 19 April 1967.		1:01
11	Christmas Eve(Reel)	Sonny Murray(concertina).	1:49
11	Recorded by John Tams & Neil Wayne in Co. Clare, January 1974.		1:49
12	The Belfast(Hornpipe)	Jimmy Cleary(banjo), Margaret Barry(banjo).	1:31
12	Recorded by Ewan MacColl at his house in Croydon, 10 March 1955.		1:31
13	Put the Cake on the Dresser(Reel)	Michael Gorman(fiddle).	1:52
13	Recorded by Peter Kennedy at Cecil Sharp House, Camden Town, London, 21 August 1956.		1:52
14	The Strayaway Child(Jig)	Michael Gorman(fiddle).	1:56
14	Recorded by Peter Kennedy at Cecil Sharp House, Camden Town, London, 21 August 1956.		1:56
15	Jenny's Welcome to Charlie(Reel)	Michael Gorman(fiddle), Margaret Barry(banjo).	4:39
15	Recorded by Peter Kennedy at Cecil Sharp House, Camden Town, London, 21 August 1956.		4:39
16	Big Pat(Reel)	Michael Falsey(flute).	1:34
16	Recorded by Michael Daly in Pat Goulding's flat, Pimlico, London, 1957.		1:34
17	Molloy's Wife(Jig)	Michael Falsey(flute).	1:48
17	Recorded by Michael Daly in Pat Goulding's flat, Pimlico, London, 1957.		1:48
18	The Clay of Kilcreggan(Slow Air)	Seamus Ennis(uilleann pipes).	2:04
18	Recording supervised by Paul Carter at the City of London Studios, London, 1960.		2:04
19	The Ace and Deuce of Piping(Programme Piece)	Seamus Ennis(uilleann pipes).	2:09
19	Recording supervised by Paul Carter at the City of London Studios, London, 1960.		2:09
20	Paddy O’Rafferty / The Sixpenny Money(Jigs)	Seamus Ennis(uilleann pipes).	3:06
20	Recording supervised by Paul Carter at the City of London Studios, London, 1960.		3:06
21	Sean sa Ceo(Reel)	Bobby Casey(fiddle).	2:08
21	Recorded by Peter Kennedy at Cecil Sharp House, Camden Town, London, 18 December 1956.		2:08
22	The Frieze Britches(Jig)	Bobby Casey(fiddle), Sean Kenny(piano).	2:53
22	Recorded by Peter Kennedy at Cecil Sharp House, Camden Town, London, 20 May 1962.		2:53
23	The Flax in Bloom(Reel)	Bobby Casey(fiddle), Sean Kenny(piano).	1:18
23	Recorded by Peter Kennedy at Cecil Sharp House, Camden Town, London, 20 May 1962.		1:18
24	The Salamanca / The Yellow Tinker(Reels)	Mick Gorman (nephew)(flute).	2:46
24	Recorded by Bill Leader, Reg Hall & Michael Plunkett at Michael Gorman's house, Manchester, 5 July 1970.		2:46
25	The Newport Lass(Jig)	Mick Gorman (nephew)(flute).	1:23
25	Recorded by Bill Leader, Reg Hall & Michael Plunkett at Michael Gorman's house, Manchester, 5 July 1970.		1:23
26	The Flogging(Reel)	Mick Gorman (nephew)(flute).	2:12
26	Recorded by Bill Leader, Reg Hall & Michael Plunkett at Michael Gorman's house, Manchester, 5 July 1970.		2:12
27	The Kid on the Mountain(Hop Jig)	Michael Gorman(fiddle).	2:36
27	Recorded by Peter Kennedy at his flat in Belsize Park, London, 25 October 1952.		2:36
28	Dwyer's(Hornpipe)	Michael Gorman(fiddle).	2:53
28	Recorded by Peter Kennedy at his flat in Belsize Park, London, 25 October 1952.		2:53
29	The Lady on the Island(Reel)	Gabe O’Sullivan(fiddle).	1:21
29	Recorded by Nic Kinsey & supervised by Peter Bellamy at Livingstone Studios, Barnet, London, April 1979.		1:21
30	Maud Miller(Reel)	Gabe O’Sullivan(flute).	1:06
30	Recorded by Michael Daly at The Galtymore, Cricklewood, London, July 1964.		1:06
31	The Mountain Pathway(Polka)	Liam Farrell(banjo).	1:11
31	Recorded by Michael Daly at Liam Farrell's house, Epsom, Surrey. December 1962.		1:11
32	The Galway Rambler(Reel)	Michael Daly(flute), Liam Farrell(banjo).	1:15
32	Recorded by Michael Daly at Liam Farrell's house, Epsom, Surrey. December 1962.		1:15
33	The Bunch of Keys / The Star of Munster(Reels)	Johnny Discin(fiddle).	3:12
33	Recorded by Michael Daly in Pat Goulding's flat, Pimlico, London, 1957.		3:12
34	Mulhaire's / Father Kelly's(Reels)	Mick Gorman (nephew)(flute).	2:30
34	Recorded by Bill Leader, Reg Hall & Michael Plunkett at Michael Gorman's house, Manchester, 5 July 1970.		2:30
35	The Concert Reel(Reel)	Edmond Murphy(fiddle), Mick Gorman (nephew)(flute).	2.01
35	Recorded by Michael Daly, London, late 1950s-early 1960s.		2.01

==== CD3 ====
This CD features recordings made between 1957 and 2001.

The musicians in the Hibernian Ceili Band are Brendan McGlinchey(fiddle), Roger Sherlock(flute), Raymond Roland(accordion), Liam Farrell(banjo), PJ Hines(piano), Brian Green(drums)

Track	Title/Where recorded	Artist/Instrument	Length
1	The Dublin(Reel)	The Hibernian Ceili Band.	1:43
1	Recording studio, Bayswater, London, 1960.		1:43
2	The Duke of Leinster & his Missus(Reels)	Bobby Casey(fiddle).	1:53
2	Recorded by Michael Daly in Pat Goulding's flat, Pimlico, London, 1957.		1:53
3	The College Grove(Reel)	Bobby Casey(fiddle).	2:30
3	Recorded by Michael Daly in Pat Goulding's flat, Pimlico, London, 1957.		2:30
4	Kitty in the Lane(Reel)	Oliver Roland(accordion).	2:24
4	Recorded by Imelda Gardiner at the Roland family house, Loughrae, Co. Galway, mid-1960s.		2:24
5	The Rookery / The Cliffs of Moher(Jigs)	Oliver Roland(accordion).	2:12
5	Recorded by Imelda Gardiner at the Roland family house, Loughrae, Co. Galway, mid-1960s.		2:12
6	Night in Ennis / The Maid behind the Bar(Reels)	Vincent Griffin(fiddle).	2:15
6	Recorded by Robin Morton, Ennis, Co. Clare, December 1976.		2:15
7	Paddy Ryan's Dream / Mamma's Pet(Reels)	Vincent Griffin(fiddle).	1:44
7	Recorded by Robin Morton, Ennis, Co. Clare, December 1976.		1:44
8	The Galway Rambler / The London Lasses(Reels)	Roger Sherlock(flute).	2:06
8	Recorded by Michael Daly at the Camden Stores, Camden Town, London, 1959.		2:06
9	The Old Bush / The Galty(Reels)	Roger Sherlock(flute), Raymond Roland(accordion), Liam Farrell(mandolin).	2:32
9	Recorded by Michael Daly at the Camden Stores, Camden Town, London, 1959.		2:32
10	Speed the Plough(Reel)	Martin McMahon(fiddle), Teresa McMahon(guitar).	2:41
10	Recorded by Teresa McMahon at their house, near Shannon, Co. Clare, c.1990.		2:41
11	The Bucks of Oranmore(Reel)	Martin McMahon(fiddle), Teresa McMahon(guitar).	2:47
11	Recorded by Teresa McMahon at their house, near Shannon, Co. Clare, c.1990.		2:47
12	The Star of Munster(Reel)	Martin McMahon(accordion), Teresa McMahon(keyboard) .	1:39
12	Recorded by Austin Barrett in a north London pub, probably 1990s.		1:39
13	The Laurel Tree(Reel)	Tommy McCarthy(concertina).	1:13
13	London, 1970s. McCarthy Family collection.		1:13
14	The Miners of Wicklow / Paddy Taylor's(Jigs)	Tommy McCarthy(uilleann pipes).	2:19
14	London, 1970s. McCarthy Family collection.		2:19
15	Garrett Barry's Favourite / The Luckpenny(Jigs)	Sean Maguirefiddle.	2:39
15	Recorded by Seamus Ennis, Belfast, 1 January 1957.		2:39
16	The Eel in the Sink(Reel)	Raymond Roland(accordion), Benny O’Connor(drums).	1:16
16	Recorded by Reg Hall at the Willesden Junction Hotel, Willesden, London, 15 March 1964.		1:16
17	Sean sa Ceo / Come West along the Road(Reel)	Raymond Roland & Kit O’Connor(accordions), John Joe Doyle(fiddle), Paddy Taylor(flute), Benny O’Connor(drums).	2:04
17	Recorded by Reg Hall at the Willesden Junction Hotel, Willesden, London, 15 March 1964.		2:04
18	The Congress / The Bag of Spuds(Reels)	Andy Boyle(fiddle), Michael Falsey & unidentified(flutes)	2:37
18	Recorded by Michael Daly in Pat Goulding's flat, Pimlico, London, 1957.		2:37
19	Dinny O’Brien / Farewell to Connacht(Reels)	Joe Ryan(fiddle).	2:05
19	Recorded by Reg Hall at Breege McArdle's flat, Crouch End, London, 5 November 2001.		2:05
20	Tommy Potts's(Reel)	Joe Ryan(fiddle).	1:46
20	Recorded by Reg Hall at Breege McArdle's flat, Crouch End, London, 5 November 2001.		1:46
21	Maud Miller(Reel)	Tommy McCarthy & Bobby Casey(fiddles).	1:11
21	Recorded by Tommy Keane, London, 1982.		1:11
22	The New Custom House(Reel)	Tommy McCarthy & Bobby Casey(fiddles).	1:19
22	London, probably late 1970s, Larry Masterson Collection.		1:19
23	I'm Waiting for You & The Bag of Spuds(Reels)	Gerry Clancy(accordion), unidentified(bodhran).	2:51
23	London, probably late 1970s, Larry Masterson Collection.		2:51
24	Carmel O’Mahony(Reel)	Johnny Hynes(Clarke's tin whistle).	1:39
24	Recorded by Reg Hall at his flat, South Norwood, London, 14 February 1965.		1:39
25	The Boys of the Town / We Drink and Kiss the Ladies(Jigs)	Johnny Hynes(Clarke's tin whistle).	1:15
25	Recorded by Reg Hall at his flat, South Norwood, London, 14 February 1965.		1:15
26	Scotch Mary(Reel)	Johnny Hynes(Clarke's tin whistle).	1:08
26	Recorded by Reg Hall at his flat, South Norwood, London, 14 February 1965.		1:08
27	The Stoney Steps(Reel)	Frank Mahoney(fiddle).	1:08
27	Recorded by Michael Daly at The Galtymore, Cricklewood, London, July 1964.		1:08
28	Bill Black's / O’Byrne's(Hornpipes)	Julia Clifford(fiddle), Billy Clifford(flute), John Clifford(piano-accordion).	3:00
28	Recorded by Reg Hall at Lucy & Eric Farr's house, Ladywell, London, 16 August 1964.		3:00
29	Old Hag, You Have Killed Me / Old Tipperary(Jigs)	Tommy McCarthy(uilleann pipes).	2:18
29	Recorded by Tommy Keane, Miltown Malbay, Co. Clare, 1998.		2:18
30	Father Kelly's(Jig)	Raymond Roland & Kit O’Connor(accordion), John Joe Doyle(fiddle), Paddy Taylor(flute), Benny O’Connor(drums).	1:31
30	Recorded by Reg Hall at the Willesden Junction Hotel, Willesden, London, 15 March 1964.		1:31
31	The Little Thatched Cottage / Down the Strand(Reels)	Raymond Roland(accordion), Kevin Taylor(drums).	1:42
31	Recorded by Reg Hall at the Willesden Junction Hotel, Willesden, London, 15 March 1964.		1:42
32	Sporting Paddy(Reel)	Michael Falsey(flute).	1:21
32	Recorded by Michael Daly in Pat Goulding's flat, Pimlico, London, 1957.		1:21
33	Cregg's Pipes(Reel)	Michael Falsey(flute).	1:55
33	Recorded by Michael Daly in Pat Goulding's flat, Pimlico, London, 1957.		1:55
34	Imelda Roland's(Reel)	Oliver Roland, accordion.	1:16
34	Recorded by Imelda Gardiner at the Roland family house, Loughrae, Co. Galway, mid-1960s.		1:16
35	Colonel Roger's / Happy Days of Youth(Reels)	Edmond Murphy(fiddle), Mick Gorman (nephew)(flute).	2:26
35	Recorded by Michael Daly at the Camden Stores, Camden Town, London, 1959.		2:26
36	The Friendly Visit / The Cuckoo(Hornpipes)	The Hibernian Ceili Band	2:55
36	Recording studio, Bayswater, London, 1960.		2:55
37	The Merry Harriers / The Hut in the Bog(Reels)	The Hibernian Ceili Band	1:46
37	Recording studio, Bayswater, London, 1960.		1:46
