= Fred Finn =

Fred Finn may refer to:

- Fred Finn (musician) (1919–1986), Irish folk musician
- Fred Finn (politician), American politician and member of the Washington House of Representatives
- Fred E. Finn, founder of the Mickie Finn's nightclub
