= Peter Horan =

Irish flute and fiddle player

Peter Horan (1926 – 17 October 2010) was an Irish flute and fiddle player from Killavil, County Sligo, who is known for having developed a unique style influenced by the local irish fiddling tradition. He was called "one of the country's best known flute and fiddle players" when he died.

== Career ==
For nearly 30 years he performed as a duet with fiddler Fred Finn. He was a brother-in-law of Dick Brennan, a noted south Sligo fiddle player of an earlier era. More recently he performed with Sliabh Luachra fiddler Gerry Harrington and the pair released a CD called "Fortune Favours the Merry," accompanied by Ollie Ross on the piano. He continued to perform and teach in Ireland and at Irish arts festivals around the world, including the Catskills Irish Arts Week and the Ennis Trad Festival. In 2002 he was given the Irish Music Awards Hall of Fame award. In 2009, St. Angela's College Sligo and NUI Galway recognised and honoured Peter as one of South Sligo's most talented and best known traditional musicians by awarding him an Honorary Master of Music. For "His authentic, natural style, which is firmly rooted in the Coleman tradition, stands out as a unique musical talent and resource within our region and our country.. . ."

Peter Horan died on 17 October 2010 in the North West Hospice, Sligo.

== Discography ==
- Music of Sligo (with Fred Finn)
- Music at Matt Molloy's (various artists), 1992
- The Mountain Road – Tune Popular in South Sligo (various artists)
- Fortune Favours The Merry (with Gerry Harrington), 2004
- The Sound of Coleman Country Various Artists Featured Appearance (2006)
- The Merry Love to Play (with Gerry Harrington), 2007
