= Paddy Cronin =

Irish fiddler (1925–2014)

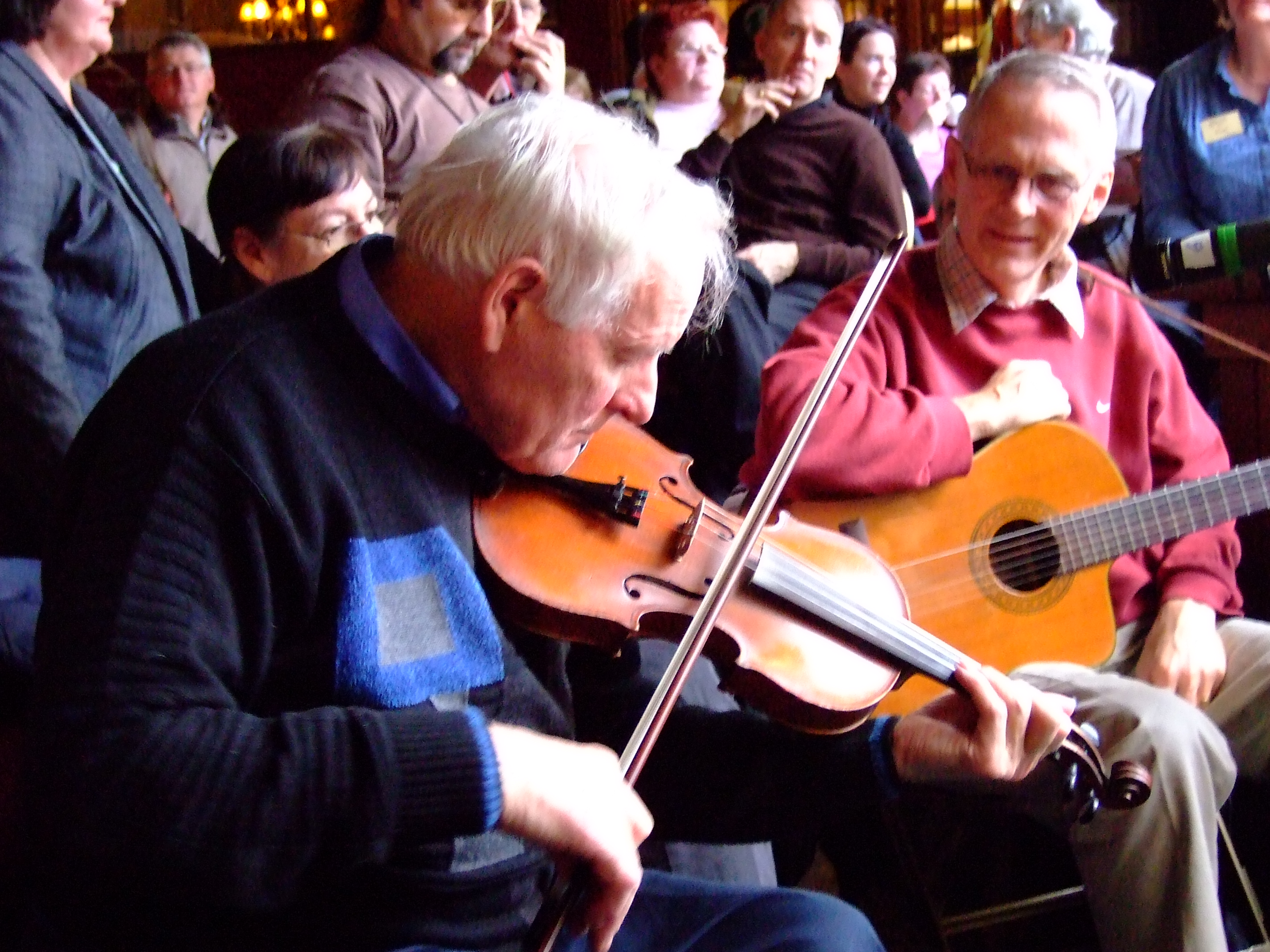
- Cronin in 2007

Background information
- Born: 6 July 1925
- Died: 15 March 2014 (aged 69)
- Genres: Traditional Irish
- Occupation: Irish fiddler
- Instrument: fiddle

Paddy Cronin (6 July 1925 – 15 March 2014) was an Irish fiddler.

Cronin was born in Ré Buí near Gneeveguilla, County Kerry. He was taught fiddle by Padraig O'Keeffe. In 1949, Seamus Ennis recorded him on acetate disc for Radió Éireann. Later that year (1949), after making these recordings, he left Ireland and emigrated to Boston in the United States. During the 1950s, he continued to record, becoming very well known through the seven 78 rpm discs he made for the Boston record label, Copley. While in Boston he also adopted the Sligo style of fellow fiddlers, Michael Coleman and James Morrison.

In the early 1970s he went on to record an LP, "Music In The Glen", for the Fleetwood label, followed by "The House In The Glen" for Talcon. In 1975, Paddy released The Rakish Paddy LP with Fiddler Records of Seattle, and in 1977 released Kerry's Own Paddy Cronin with Outlet Records of Belfast.

In 1991, Cronin returned to Ireland with his wife, Connie and settled in Killarney. Upon his return he featured in local music festivals and sessions.

In 2007, Cronin was awarded the prestigious Gradam Ceoil, or Lifetime Achievement Award, by the Irish Gaelic-language television station TG4, in honour of his contribution to Irish traditional music over six decades.
