= Mary Custy =

- Born: Toonagh, County Clare, Ireland
- Instrument: Fiddle

Mary Custy is an Irish musician. She is a fiddle player that was born into a musical family. Custy was born in Toonagh, a small town in County Clare, Ireland. Her father is Frank Custy, who was the local school teacher. Mary Custy learned to play the fiddle at the age of seven or eight. As a result of her father being the music teacher, her siblings, neighbors, and friends knew how to play instruments. Because of this, Custy furthered her career by joining bands, traveling the world, producing albums, and opening a music school.

== Career ==
In 1983, Custy moved to Doolin; she lived there for six years and played with Eoin O'Neill. While living in Doolin, Custy joined her childhood friend Sharon Shannon's band. She played with the band for two years, in which time she traveled the world and performed with people such as Nanci Griffith in Scotland and Donal Lunny in the studio. In 1995, Custy began teaching group classes prior to teaching private lessons, eventually opening up her own school in Ennis. After the opening of the school, Custy produced three albums, each containing different content, and she produced two albums with Eoin O'Neill.

Custy and O'Neill produced two albums containing various artists on different instruments; one of the artists featured on the album is Sharon Shannon. Mary Custy produced After 10:30 in 1999; the album features Stephen Flaherty. The self-produced album provides "a natural, instinctive skill that relaxes the soul while still leaning into the rhythm to keep it lively," and it has a different style than her album The Mary Custy Band. Barr Trá is Mary Custy's second album produced during 2003. The album's name derives from the name of a town on the coast of West Clare. Along with After 10:30, the music according to music reviews, the album is relaxing; the selection of songs on the album varied from Chinese folk songs, a traditional Mexican song, a waltz, and a Sicilian tune. The last album Custy produced was in 2007 called The Mary Custy Band. The album contains instruments that are not the traditional Irish instruments like a drum kit and an electric guitar, showing the evolution of Mary Custy's music. After The Mary Custy Band, Custy focused her efforts on teaching at her music school.

== Albums ==
- The Best of Irish Music (1991, with Eoin O'Neill)
- The Ways of the World (1991, with Eoin O'Neill)
- After 10:30 (1999)
- Barr Trá (2003)
- The Mary Custy Band (2007)
