= Toonagh, County Clare =

Village in County Clare, Ireland

Toonagh Tamhnach
- Village
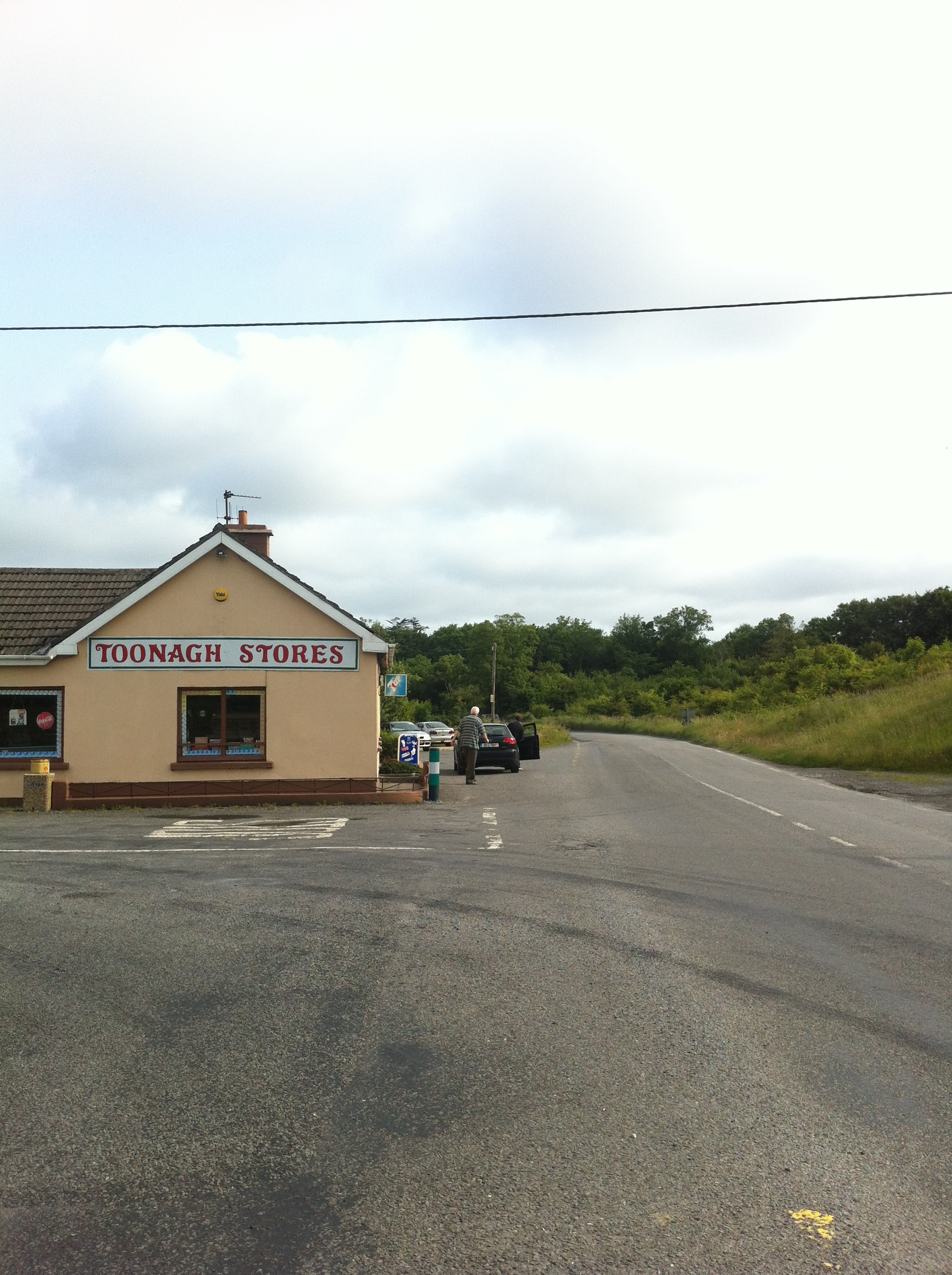
- Toonagh Stores on the R476 road

- Location in Ireland
- Coordinates: 52.89°N 9.032°W
- Country: Ireland
- Province: Munster
- County: County Clare
- Time zone: UTC+0 (WET)
  - Summer (DST): UTC-1 (IST (WEST))
- Irish Grid Reference: R330871

Toonagh (Irish: Tamhnach, meaning 'green area among rocks') is a village in County Clare, Ireland.

== Location ==
Toonagh is located between Corofin and Ennis on the R476 road. It is in the civil parish of Dysert which is in the barony of Inchiquin.

== Toonagh Hall ==
The hall in Toonagh was built in 1971. It was built by the local branch of Dysart Muintir na Tire. The hall covers the playground of the old school.

== Handball ==
The Toonagh handball alley was built in 1975. It is a 40x20 court. The Handball World Championships were held in Ireland in 1994 and Toonagh was one of the venues used. The local Toonagh team have won titles in both the All-Ireland and Munster competitions.

== Notable people ==
- Cyril Lyons, former Irish hurler and manager
