= Sliabh Luachra =

Upland region in southwestern Ireland

Sliabh Luachra (Irish pronunciation: [ʃl̠ʲiəw ˈl̪ˠuəxɾˠə]), sometimes anglicised Slieve Logher, is an upland region in Munster, Ireland. It is on the borders of counties Cork, Kerry and Limerick, and bounded to the south by the River Blackwater. It includes the Mullaghareirk Mountains.

== Music and Culture ==
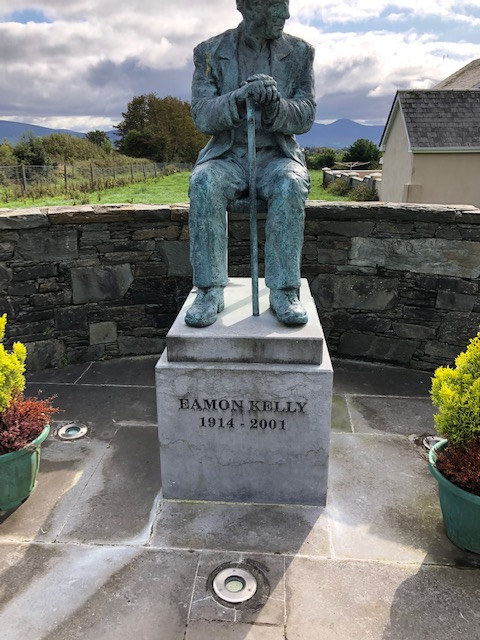
A statue of Eamon Kelly in Gneeveguilla

Sliabh Luachra has produced several Irish poets: Geoffrey Fionn Dálaigh, Aogán Ó Rathaille, and the charismatic Gaelic poet Eoghan Rua Ó Súilleabháin (1748–1784). This latter poet's many exploits live on in local folklore, as do his poetry and aislings (dramatic descriptions). His solo set dance, "Rodney's Glory," was composed in 1783 and follows his adventures after being forced to join the British Navy. Sliabh Luachra was also the birthplace of the folklorist, poet and translator Edward Walsh (1805–1850), actor and storyteller, Eamon Kelly (1914–2001), Patrick S. Dinneen, who compiled Dineen's Dictionary, viewed as the "bible" of Irish language, and Tomás Rathaille, Superior General of the Presentation Brothers 1905–1925 who wrote two books of Irish poetry: An Spideog and An Cuaicín Draoidheachta. This tradition of poetry continues to the present day with Bernard O'Donoghue (now a lecturer at Oxford University), who won the prestigious Whitbread prize for a collection of poems in 1993/94. Professor Daniel Corkery, author of The Hidden Ireland, wrote that Sliabh Luachra was the literary capital of Ireland.

This region has a unique musical style which makes heavy use of the polka and the slide. Musicians from the area include Denis Murphy, Julia Clifford, Paddy Cronin, Padraig O'Keeffe, Terence Teahan, Johnny O'Leary, Maurice O'Keeffe, Jackie Daly, Con Curtin and Dónal Murphy.

== Religion ==
St Moling was born in Sliabh Luachra in 614 AD. On 17 September 1583, during the last stages of the Second Desmond Rebellion, Fr. Muiris Mac Ionrachtaigh, a Roman Catholic priest and the Rebel Earl's confessor and chaplain, was captured by Viscount Roche's Gallowglass upon Sliabh Luachra. He was hanged at Clonmel on 30 April 1585 and Beatified alongside 16 other Irish Catholic Martyrs by Pope John Paul II on 27 September 1992.

== History ==
The mountainous area along the Cork/Kerry border is known as Sliabh Luachra. This uninhabited wet, marshy, rushy, mountain area of the old Kingdom of Luachra was first noted in the Annals of Inisfallen in 534 when the King of Luacar won a battle against Tuathal Moel nGarb. It came to light again in 741 AD with the death of Cuaine, Abbot of Ferna and Flan Ferna, son of Cormac King of Luachra.

Hundreds of years ago, the area was sparsely populated. It was an area of bogs, rushes, marshes, and woodlands, an area only suitable for refugees trying to avoid the imperial authorities. Its remoteness and the barren soil proved attractive to those people as the authorities were less likely to bother them in their inhospitable environment.

Settlement did not come to the remaining thousand square miles of Sliabh Luachra until the Desmond rebellion. This rebellion ended with the death of Gerald Fitzgerald, the 15th Earl of Desmond in 1583. His last hiding place, Teach an Iarla, can still be seen cut into a glen in the heart of the Sliabh Luachra mountains near the source of the river Blackwater. The rebellion resulted in the scorched earth policy of Queen Elizabeth's army, which devastated much of Munster. Men, women and children were put to the sword and land and crops were burned, resulting in a great famine, impacting the area from Ventry to Cashel.

Following this devastation, Munster began restoration with a half a million acres being declared Crown property and being distributed to English landlords. Former inhabitants were ordered to relocate to Connacht. Some of the dispossessed and poverty stricken people of Munster took refuge in Sliabh Luachra, which was also Crown property. Much of this land was recorded as mountain pastures; however, the authorities were unsuccessful at its distribution to landlords.

This area remained undisturbed and largely unaccounted for until the agrarian disturbances of the Rockite movement in the 1820s. The Rockite movement began in West Limerick in the summer of 1821. The first leader of the Rockite movement, known as Captain Rock, was a Patrick Dillane who may have come from the Sliabh Luachra area. Many of the leaders of the movement hid in Sliabh Luachra, thereby creating British Government concern over the area's preponderance of outlaws and rebels. Further, the Government was not receiving any revenues from the area and was unable to control the 960 square miles due to lack of roads and communication.

A report by James Weale on the Crown Lands of County Cork addressed the Government's apprehensions in the House of Commons. It also pointed out that, in the summer, farmers from North Kerry and parts of West Limerick would transport butter on horseback via a mountain path through the Rockchapel to Newmarket, two firkins per horse. There, it was transferred to horse carts carrying 24 firkins and sent on to the largest butter market in the world in Cork City. In 1830, these farmers sent 30,000 firkins valued at 52,000, with much of it passing through the Rockchapel mountain path.

This report then initiated a program of road building, including the road from Castle Island to Clonbanin, from Ballydesmond to Newmarket, and the new line road, along the Feale Valley from Feales Bridge through Rockchapel to Newmarket, The engineering work on these roads and bridges was completed by Richard Griffith, who later became well known in Ireland through his Griffith valuations of 1852. The report also created the village of Kingwilliamstown (Ballydesmond), as was a model farm at Glencollins near Ballydesmond. Here, it was demonstrated that good grass could be grown on peaty soil by the use of burnt lime, resulting in the building of lime kilns in and around the Sliabh Luachra area.

In 1896, Gneeveguilla was the scene of the devastating moving bog, a landslide which wiped out an entire family as they slept.

The first Auxiliary Division fatality was killed in Rathmore on 10 July 1920.

The Headford Ambush took place at Barraduff in 1921. Thirty-two IRA volunteers ambushed a train carrying British soldiers. A total of sixteen people died including ten British soldiers, two IRA volunteers and four civilians.

== Geography ==
Opinions differ as to the exact region of Sliabh Luachra, but it is generally accepted to refer to the mountainous, rush-filled upland that straddles the border area of Cork, Kerry, and Limerick, including the Kerry parishes of Ballymacelligott, Cordal, Brosna, Currow, Knocknagoshel, Barraduff, Gneeveguilla, Scartaglen and Rathmore, the Cork villages of Ballydesmond, Kiskeam, Rockchapel, Knocknagree, Cullen, Boherbue, Meelin, and Freemount, and the Limerick villages of Killeedy, Tournafulla, Templeglantine, Athea, Mountcollins and Abbeyfeale

== Etymology ==
The name Sliabh Luachra means "a mountain of rushes". However, it is not a single mountain, but a rolling plateau interspersed with what is generally accepted as its seven glens, or 'seacht ngleann Shliabh Luachra', over which various mountain peaks reach heights of 500 metres.
