= Julia Clifford =

Irish fiddler

- Born: June 19, 1914; Gneeveguilla, County Kerry, Ireland
- Died: June 18, 1997 (aged 82)
- Occupations: Fiddler, Irish traditional musician

Julia Clifford (19 June 1914 – 18 June 1997) was a fiddler and Irish traditional musician.

== Life ==
Julia Murphy was born at Lisheen, Gneeveguilla, County Kerry, part of an area in west Munster known as Sliabh Luachra. Her father Bill played flute, fife and fiddle, and had a fife and drum band. Both she and her brother Denis Murphy, also a musician, were taught the fiddle by the noted travelling fiddler and fiddle teacher from the same area, Padraig O'Keeffe.

Clifford, her brother, O'Keeffe, and other musicians from the Sliabh Luachra area are regarded as a significant influence on Irish traditional music and have given rise to the term Sliabh Luachra style.

In the late Thirties she emigrated to Scotland and then to London where she worked as a hotel maid before marrying John Clifford in 1941. He was an accordion player, also from Kerry, and they had two sons, John and Billy. In the Forties they played the Irish dance halls in London. In the 1950s they returned to Ireland for a time, living in Newcastle West in County Limerick. They performed in the Star of Munster Ceili Band with which they made radio recordings.

Back in London Julia enjoyed greater popularity with the onset of the Sixties folk boom. In 1968 Claddagh recorded herself and brother Denis Murphy on an album of Kerry music, The Star Above the Garter.

Rediscovered by the British folk club scene of the Seventies, Topic in 1977 issued an earlier recording of herself with brother Denis and Padraig O'Keeffe, Kerry Fiddles (Music from Sliabh Luachra). This was followed by two LPs featuring a range of music from various periods played by Julia, her husband and her son Billy, a flute player.

The wider appreciation of the music of Sliabh Luachra - particularly its Kerry slides and polkas - came late in life for Julia Clifford. The Cliffords lived in a small council flat in Hackney in East London before being rehoused in Thetford, Norfolk in the late Seventies.

In the Eighties and Nineties her reputation grew, being invited to perform at folk clubs and festivals. She performed on trips back to Ireland and was introduced to TV audiences. She also visited America. Many young players who sought her out to learn tunes and styles from her Kerry repertoire found her generous and encouraging. Her husband John died in 1981. Julia Clifford died on June 18, 1997, one day before her 84th birthday, and is buried in Norfolk.

== Discography ==
- Kerry Fiddles. Padraig O'Keefe (fiddle), Denis Murphy (fiddle), Julia Clifford (fiddle). Topic TSCD 309, 1994. Reissue of Topic 12T309, 1977. Recorded by Seamus Ennis 9 Sept. 1952 in Castleisland, Co. Kerry.
- Paddy in the Smoke. Martin Byrnes (fiddle), Danny Meehan (fiddle), Bobby Casey (fiddle), Tony McMahon (accordion), Andy Boyle (fiddle), Jimmy Power (fiddle), Jimmy Dunleavy (fiddle), Sean O'Shea (fiddle), Con Curtin (fiddle), Denis McMahon (fiddle), Julia Clifford (fiddle), Tommy Maguire (accordion), Father O'Keeffe (mandolin), Lucy Farr (fiddle), Edmond Murphy (fiddle), with Reg Hall (piano), John McLaughlin (spoons). Topic TSCD 603, 1997. "Re-mastered edition" of Topic 12T176, 1968, with "additional material and new notes." Some material from original LP is missing here. Notes to reissue by Reg Hall.
- The Star above the Garter. Fiddle music from Kerry, played by Denis Murphy and Julia Clifford. Denis Murphy (fiddle), Julia Clifford (fiddle). Claddagh CC5CD, 1969. Recorded in Dublin.
- The Humours of Lisheen, Julia and John Clifford, Topic (LP). Julia Clifford, 1914–97
- Music from Sliabh Luachra. Denis Murphy (fiddle), Julia Clifford (fiddle), Pádraig O'Keeffe (fiddle), Andy McGann (fiddle), Johnny O'Leary (button accordion) & Séamus Ennis (uilleann pipes) (RTÉ 183 CD - 1995)
- Ceol as Sliabh Luachra. Julia Clifford (fiddle), Billy Clifford (flute), with Manus Lunny - (Gael Linn - CEF 092 - 1982)
- The Star of Munster Trio. Julia Clifford (fiddle), John Clifford (accordion), Billy Clifford (flute) - (Topic - 12TS310 - 1977)

From The Voice of the People series

- It was mighty - The Early Days of Irish Music in London (Topic Records - TSCD679T)
- It was great altogether - The Continuing Tradition of Irish Music in London (Topic Records - TSCD680T)
