= Slide (tune type) =

In Irish traditional music, a slide (Irish: sleamhnán) is a tune type in 12/8 akin to, and often confused with, a single jig. Slides are played mostly in the Sliabh Luachra region of Munster province in southwest Ireland, but originate from quadrilles.

Though slides contain the same number of beats per tune as a single jig, melodies are phrased in four rather than two beats. Consequently, single jigs are notated as having eight bars per part and slides as having four bars. Furthermore, the pace is quicker than single jigs, often around 150bpm. While single jigs are often danced solo by step dancers, slides are usually danced in groups by set dancers, sometimes in sets with polkas.

== See also ==
- Polka
- Quadrille
