= Fred Finn (musician) =

Fred Finn (1919, Killavil, County Sligo – January 1986) was a popular musician in South Sligo, in western Ireland, known for his wit and humour as well as his fiddle playing. His father Mick, a Fianna Fáil activist and former councillor, was also a fiddle player.

Fred played with many musicians from the locality, and for 30 years performed as a duo with Peter Horan.

His 1966 album Mickie Finn's – America's No. 1 Speakeasy, which included Finn's Television Cast, achieved commercial success, reaching No. 120 in the US during a fifteen-week run on the charts.

== Discography ==
- Music of Sligo (with Peter Horan)
- Mickie Finn's – America's No. 1 Speakeasy (No. 120 US)
