= Denis Murphy (musician) =

American musician

Denis Murphy (14 November 1910 – 7 April 1974) was an Irish fiddler and traditional musician.

Murphy was born in Lisheen, Gneeveguilla, County Kerry one of eight children of Bill and Mainie (née Corbett) Murphy. His father played fife, flute and fiddle and had a fife and drum band. It was a house where music was played a lot with neighbours calling in. He and his sister Julia Clifford were taught fiddle by Pádraig O'Keeffe. He later played with the Lisheen Fife and Drum Band.

Murphy married Julia Mary Sheehan on 7 April 1942 and in 1949 they emigrated to New York City, where Denis worked in various jobs and was active in the music scene. They returned home in 1952, went back again and finally settled back in Lisheen in 1965. While in the United States he played with the Ballinamore Ceili Band, with such players as Paddy Killoran, James Morrison, Andy McGann, Lad O'Beirne and Charlie Mulvihill.

== Discography ==
- Rogha Chiarrai / An Coirneal Frazer / An Bad Gaile" (1958) 10", 78 RPM single with Seosamh Ó hÉanaí, Gael Linn CE 4
- Anna Naofa / An Móinéar (1958) 10", 78 RPM single with Seán 'ac Dhonncha, Gael Linn CE 5
- The Star Above the Garter (1969), with sister Julia Clifford, Claddagh Records CC5CD
- Music from Sliabh Luachra Volume 1: Kerry Fiddles (1977), with Pádraig O'Keeffe & Julia Clifford, Topic 12T 309 / TSCD309 and Ossian OSSCD10
- Denis Murphy: Music from Sliabh Luachra (1995), solo, RTÉ CD 183
