= Padraig O'Keeffe =

Pádraig O'Keeffe
- Born: Patrick O'Keeffe
- Died: 22 February 1963 St.Catherine's Hospital, Tralee, County Kerry, Ireland
- Genres: Irish
- Occupations: Musician, Teacher
- Instruments: Fiddle, Melodeon
- Years active: 1920–1963

Pádraig O'Keeffe (Irish: Pádraig Ó Caoimh) (died 1963) was an Irish traditional musician.

O'Keeffe was the eldest of eight children from a musical family. He was known for his fiddle playing, self-devised system of notating music, and numerous skilled pupils. He is regarded as one of the greatest fiddlers of the Sliabh Luachra style. His death marked the end of the travelling fiddlemasters of Munster.

There is no great consistency in the spelling of the anglicised version of his name. On returns from the 1901 census, he is listed as Patrick O'Keeffe. He was known locally as Patrick or Pádraic Keeffe. On recording labels his surname is recorded as O'Keeffe (and incorrectly) O'Keefe.

== Early years ==
Pádraig O'Keeffe was born to John Leahy O'Keeffe of Glountane, a schoolmaster and skilled dancer, and Margaret O'Callaghan of Doonasleen ("Doon"), Kishkeam, County Cork, the latter of whom played fiddle and concertina. In that part of the country it was then a tradition to send the eldest son to his maternal grandparents to be raised.

Living in the same townland as Padraig's grandparents was his uncle Callaghan "Cal" O'Callaghan. Cal O'Callaghan had emigrated to the United States as a young man and had picked up various contracts as a buffalo hunter on the Great Plains for railroad companies, as well as one logging in Ohio. A fiddler himself, O'Callaghan is said to have worked with numerous Scottish immigrants who left major influences on him, among them tunes and technique. Upon returning some 20 years later, O'Callaghan is said to have played constantly and is credited as being a major influence on O'Keeffe.

Local legend suggests that Padraig O'Keeffe was able to tune a fiddle at the age of four. He is supposed to have received some formal instruction of the fiddle at his father's request but it is unknown who his instructor was.

== Life as school master ==
O'Keeffe attended school at Glountane until he was sent to his grandparents, attending Ummeraboy National School to the age of fifteen. He is then believed to have attended the Ballydesmond National School for secondary school. Upon graduation, he left for Glasnevin, Dublin, to train as a national school teacher (as shown on 1911 census return) upon his father's request where he learned some music theory. After qualifying he returned to Kerry, where he taught brief stints at a number of local schools and substituted at Glountane. After his father's death of recurring illness on 30 April 1915, he was called upon to take over as principal of Glountane National School, adjacent to the O'Keeffe home in Glountane Cross.

John O'Keeffe had been known as a hard schoolmaster (even inciting a boycott against him in 1890), but Pádraig O'Keeffe did not carry on this legacy and was thought to have been as kind as his father was strict, and was thought to have been very progressive in his lessons, even holding some lessons outside (in a style more reminiscent of a hedge school).

Pádraig O'Keeffe is said at this time to have met Abbie Scollard, who he courted for some time. The two are said to have had a minor falling out due to his mother's notion that he ought to marry into his own class (of teaching and education). Scollard emigrated to Chicago and did not return, and is supposed to have been happily married with no ill feelings toward O'Keeffe. O'Keeffe is not known to have maintained any further love interests, though he was often quoted as referring to his fiddle as his wife, being quoted once as saying "When I stroke her across the belly she purrs". He lived in the family home in Glountane with his mother. O'Keeffe did not care for the teaching work and he was often missing when he should have been calling role. After numerous poor showings, O'Keeffe was replaced officially on 30 June 1920, largely to the regret of his mother. Upon his mother's death in 1938, Pádraig O'Keeffe is said to have played his fiddle the entire night through.

At this point, O'Keeffe attempted to take up as a cattle dealer, and found work as a clerk in Tralee before returning to teaching, this time of music.

== Musical career ==
The remainder of his life was spent teaching and playing the fiddle in his distinctive style. He also composed a number of tunes including Johhny Cope, a six-part variation on a traditional Celtic melody. He frequently played in Jack Lyon's pub in Scartaglen. Among his pupils were Denis Murphy, Murphy's sister Julia Clifford and Johnny O'Leary.

== Recordings ==
His music was collected in 1947-49 by Séamus Ennis and later by Séamus Mac Mathúna. These recordings were broadcast on Radio Éireann (RTÉ), and later re-used by the BBC in 1952, bringing him wide fame. The 1940s recordings were later issued on a CD "Pádraig O'Keeffe: The Sliabh Luachra Fiddle Master" in 1993.

== Commemoration ==
Since 1993 the "Patrick O'Keeffe Traditional Music Festival" has been held in Castleisland in Kerry.
