= List of All-Ireland Fleadh champions =

Winners of traditional Irish music competitions

This page lists those who have won the senior title at Fleadh Cheoil na hÉireann title since its foundation in 1951 by Comhaltas Ceoltóirí Éireann. There were no competitions in 2020 and 2021 due to the Covid-19 pandemic. Once you win a senior title, you are automatically placed into the All Ireland competition the following year giving you a chance to defend the title. Whilst the majority do not return, some have defended their title on multiple occasions.

There are competitions for soloists, duos, trios, and various types of ensembles, many of which are divided into separate competitions by age group. A list of the categories is found here.

== Fiddle (Fidil) ==
- 1951, Pat Kelly, County Tyrone
- 1952, Bobby Casey, County Clare
- 1953, Paddy Canny, County Clare
- 1954, Aggie Whyte, County Galway
- 1955, Seán Ryan, County Tipperary
- 1956, Seán Ryan, County Tipperary
- 1957, Jimmy McHugh, Glasgow, Scotland
- 1958, Seán McLoughlan, County Antrim
- 1959, John Gallagher, County Donegal
- 1960, Cáit Ní Chuis, County Limerick
- 1961, Séamus Connolly, County Clare
- 1962, Brendan McGlinchey, County Armagh
- 1963, Séamus Connolly, County Clare
- 1964, Gus Tierney, County Clare
- 1965, Gerry Forde, County Wexford
- 1966, Kathleen Collins, New York City
- 1967, Maura Connolly, County Laois
- 1968, Bobby Casey, County Clare
- 1969, Joe Ryan, County Clare
- 1970, Máirtín Byrnes, County Galway
- 1971, Antóin Mac Gabhann, County Cavan
- 1972, Antóin Mac Gabhann, County Cavan
- 1973, Paddy Glackin, County Dublin
- 1974, Vincent Griffin, County Clare
- 1975, Liz Carroll, Chicago, USA
- 1976, Jim McKillop, County Antrim
- 1977, Maurice Lennon, County Leitrim
- 1978, Seán Nugent, County Fermanagh
- 1979, Frank Kelly, County Donegal
- 1980, Eileen O'Brien, County Tipperary
- 1981, Martin Hayes, County Clare
- 1982, Martin Hayes, County Clare
- 1983, Jimmy McBride, County Donegal
- 1984, Eileen Ivers, New York City
- 1985, Cathal Hayden, County Tyrone
- 1986, Brian Conway, New York City
- 1987, Brendan Larrissey, County Louth
- 1988, Bríd Harper, County Donegal
- 1989, Áine O'Connor, County Limerick
- 1990, Brian Lavery, County Londonderry
- 1991, Thomas Morrow, County Leitrim
- 1992, Mac Dara Ó Raghallaigh, County Meath
- 1993, Áine McGrath, County Kildare
- 1994, Andrew Dinan, Manchester, England
- 1995, Liz Kane, County Galway
- 1996, Kevin Madden, Manchester, England
- 1997, Ursula Byrne, County Down
- 1998, Mark Lavery, County Londonderry
- 1999, Oisín Mac Diarmada, County Sligo
- 2000, Ita Cunningham, County Galway
- 2001, Zoe Conway, County Louth
- 2002, Fergal Scahill, County Galway
- 2003, Aisling Ní Choisdealbha, County Tipperary
- 2004, Michael O Rourke, County Clare
- 2005, Michael Harrison, County Tipperary
- 2006, Aidan O’Neill, County Tyrone
- 2007, Laura Beagon, County Monaghan
- 2008, Rónán Mac Grianna, County Mayo
- 2009, Johnny Canning, Glasgow, Scotland
- 2010, Lisa Ward, County Leitrim
- 2011, Tara Breen, County Clare
- 2012, Niall Murphy, County Armagh
- 2013, Lydia Warnock, County Leitrim
- 2014, Dylan Foley, New York, USA
- 2015, Aoife Cunningham, County Cavan
- 2016, Darragh Curtin, County Kerry
- 2017, Roisín Anne Hughes, Glasgow, Scotland
- 2018, Caoimhe Kearins, County Sligo
- 2019, Dylan Carlos, County Roscommon
- 2022, Sarah O'Gorman, County Waterford
- 2023, Ademar O Connor, County Offaly
- 2024, Órla Ní Chorragáin, County Monaghan
- 2025, Orla O'Connor, Portland, OR, USA
- 2026, Mairéad Ní Bhriain, County Tipperary

== Button Accordion (Bosca Ceoil) ==
- 1951, Joe Boland, County Offaly
- 1952, Frank Gavigan, County Westmeath
- 1953, Paddy O'Brien, County Tipperary
- 1954, Kieran Kelly, County Offaly
- 1955, Kieran Kelly, County Offaly
- 1956, George Ross, County Wexford
- 1957, Michael Mullins, County Offaly
- 1958, Danny Coughlan, County Offaly
- 1959, Joe Burke, County Galway
- 1960, Joe Burke, County Galway
- 1961, Brendan Mulhair, County Galway
- 1962, Martin McMahon, County Clare
- 1963, John Bowe, County Offaly
- 1964, Tommy McGuire. County Offaly
- 1965, Paddy Ryan, County Tipperary
- 1966, Tom Ferris, County Wexford
- 1967, Ellen Flanagan Comerford, County Offaly
- 1968, Dick Sherlock, County Sligo
- 1969, Pat Barton, County Offaly
- 1970, John Regan, County Sligo
- 1971, Paddy Gavin, County Dublin
- 1972, Seán Gavin, County Galway
- 1973, P. J. Hernon, County Galway
- 1974, Jackie Daly, County Cork
- 1975, Paddy O'Brien, County Offaly
- 1976, Deirdre Collis, County Sligo
- 1977, Gerry Hanley, County Galway
- 1978, Martin Connolly, County Clare
- 1979, John Lucid, County Kerry
- 1980, Séamus Walshe, County Clare
- 1981, Tom O'Connell, County Limerick
- 1982, John Nolan, New York City, USA
- 1983, John Whelan, Luton, England / New Jersey, USA
- 1984, John Connolly, County Tipperary
- 1985, Willie Fogarty, County Tipperary
- 1986, Billy McComiskey, Brooklyn, New York / Baltimore, Maryland, USA
- 1987, Michael Sexton, County Clare
- 1988, Paddy Clancy, County Limerick
- 1989, John Bass, County Wexford
- 1990, John Bass, County Wexford
- 1991, Michael O'Connell, London
- 1992, Ned Kelly, County Tipperary
- 1993, Colin Nea, County Westmeath
- 1994, Colin Nea, County Westmeath
- 1995, Pádraig Kinsella, County Offaly
- 1996, Danny O'Mahony, County Kerry
- 1997, Alan Costello, County Tipperary
- 1998, Maurice Egan, County Kerry
- 1999, James Kinsella, County Offaly
- 2000, Nuala Hehir, County Clare
- 2001, T. P. McNamara, County Kerry
- 2002, Fiachna Ó Mongain, County Mayo
- 2003, Oliver Diviney, County Galway
- 2004, Marie Walsh, County Galway
- 2005, Damien Mullane, West London, England
- 2006, Pádraig Ó Foghlú (Patrick Foley), County Limerick
- 2007, Damien Mullane, West London, England
- 2008, Darren Breslin, County Fermanagh/East London, England
- 2009, Padraig King, County Limerick
- 2010, Conor Moriarty, County Kerry
- 2011, Vanessa Millar, County Clare
- 2012, Martin O'Connell, County Kerry/Laois
- 2013, Christopher Maguire, County Fermanagh
- 2014, Michael Curran, County Tyrone
- 2015, Daithí Gormley, County Sligo
- 2016, Uinseann Ó Murchú, County Wexford
- 2017, Colm Slattery, County Tipperary
- 2018, John McCann, County Fermanagh
- 2019, Seamus Tiernan, County Mayo
- 2022, Keelan McGrath, County Tipperary
- 2023, Aaron Glancy, County Sligo
- 2024, Ryan Sheridan, County Sligo
- 2025, Noel Stapleton, County Laois
- 2026, Joseph Mannion, County Waterford

== Flute (Feadóg Mhór) ==
- 1951, Paddy Treacy, County Galway
- 1952, Paddy Treacy, County Galway
- 1953, Vincent Broderick, County Galway
- 1954, Ned Coleman, County Galway and Vincent Broderick, County Galway (tie)
- 1955, Peter Broderick, County Galway
- 1956, Peadar O'Loughlin, County Clare
- 1957, Peadar O'Loughlin, County Clare
- 1958, P. J. Maloney, County Tipperary
- 1959, Michael Falsey, County Clare
- 1960, Paddy Carty, County Galway
- 1961, Paddy Carty, County Galway
- 1962, Cathal McConnell, County Fermanagh
- 1963, Paddy Carty, County Galway
- 1964, Paddy Treacy, County Galway
- 1965, Séamus Tansey, County Sligo
- 1966, Matt Molloy, County Roscommon
- 1967, John Brady, County Offaly
- 1968, Mícheál Ó Halmhain, County Dublin
- 1969, Mícheál Ó Halmhain, County Dublin
- 1970, Billy Clifford, London
- 1971, P. O. Ceannabhain, County Galway
- 1972, Patsy Hanly, County Roscommon
- 1973, Eugene Nolan, County Laois
- 1974, Josie McDermott, County Sligo
- 1975, Deirdre Collis, County Sligo
- 1976, Peig McGrath Needham, County Roscommon
- 1977, Pat "Patsy" Moloney, County Limerick/Birmingham, England
- 1978, Tommy Guihan, County Roscommon
- 1979, Marcus Hernon, County Galway, and Leon Agnew, County Antrim (tie)
- 1980, Marcus Hernon, County Galway
- 1981, Michael Harty, County Tipperary
- 1982, Noel Sweeney, County Longford
- 1983, Paul Gallagher, Luton/London
- 1984, Siobhán O'Donnell, London
- 1985, Claire Burke, County Offaly
- 1986, Sharon McDermott, County Tyrone
- 1987, Pat Fitzpatrick, County Wexford
- 1988, Garry Shannon, County Clare
- 1989, Attracta Brady, County Offaly
- 1990, Thomas McElvogue, Leeds
- 1991, Sharon Burke, London
- 1992, Martin Glynn, County Clare
- 1993, Paul McGlinchey, County Tyrone
- 1994, Paul McGlinchey, County Tyrone
- 1995, Paul McGlinchey, County Tyrone
- 1996, Majella Bartley, County Monaghan
- 1997, Sandra Deegan, County Carlow
- 1998, June McCormack, County Sligo
- 1999, Tom O'Connor, County Kerry
- 2000, Sarah-Jane Woods, County Dublin
- 2001, Louise Mulcahy, County Limerick
- 2002, Isaac Alderson, Chicago
- 2003, Aoife Ní Ghrainbhil, County Kerry
- 2004, Michael Mac Conraí, County Limerick
- 2005, Siobhán Hogan, County Clare
- 2006, James Mahon, County Dublin
- 2007, Cian Kearins, County Sligo
- 2008, Stiofan Ó Dochartaigh (Stephen Doherty), County Mayo
- 2009, Cathy Jones, County Kilkenny
- 2010, Paraic Stapleton, County Tipperary
- 2011, Orlaith McAullife, London
- 2012, Tommy Fitzharris, County Laois
- 2013, Jillian Ní Mháille (O'Malley), County Mayo
- 2014, Siobhán Ní Uirc (Joanne Quirke), County Cork
- 2015, Cein Sweeney, County Cavan
- 2016, Séamus Tierney, County Cavan
- 2017, Tiernan Courell, County Sligo
- 2018, Tom Gavin, County Sligo
- 2019, Ciarán Mac Gearailt (FitzGerald), County Kildare
- 2022, Barry Conaty, County Cavan
- 2023, Shauna Cullen, County Sligo
- 2024, Ellen O'Brien, County Cavan
- 2025, Cian Kilkenny, County Mayo
- 2026, Molly Pittendrigh, County Mayo

== Tin Whistle (Feadóg Stáin) ==
- 1951, H. McGee, County Westmeath
- 1953, E. Maloney, County Galway
- 1954, T. Sheridan, County Cavan
- 1955, T. Sheridan, County Cavan
- 1956, S. O hAodha, County Clare
- 1957, M. O'Cleirig, County Clare and Matthew Lynch, County Cavan (Joint Result)
- 1958, M. MacEil, County Roscommon
- 1959, Martin Talty, County Clare
- 1960, Michael Falsey, County Clare
- 1961, Michael Falsey, County Clare
- 1962, Cathal McConnell, County Fermanagh
- 1964, Josie McDermott, County Sligo
- 1965, Michael O'Dwyer, London England / County Cork
- 1966, Josie McDermott, County Sligo
- 1967, Anne Sheehy, County Kerry
- 1968, Michael Graham, County Kildare
- 1969, Joe McKevitt, County Louth
- 1970, Mary Bergin, County Dublin
- 1971, Roy Galvin, County Dublin
- 1972, Deirdre Collis, County Sligo
- 1973, Micho Russell, County Clare
- 1974, Michael Gavin, County Dublin
- 1975, S. O’Riain, (Seán Ryan) County Tipperary.
- 1976, Father Charlie Coen, New York City
- 1977, Diarmuid O’Cionnaith, County Dublin
- 1978, Marcus O hlarnan, County Galway
- 1979, Peter McAlinden, London, England
- 1980, Damhnait Nic Suibhne, County Donegal
- 1981, Liz King - Cassidy, County Wexford
- 1982, Maire. Ní Mhaonacgh, County Limerick
- 1983, Sean Smyth, County Mayo
- 1984, Joanie Madden, New York
- 1985, Padraig Donlon, County Longford
- 1986, Sharon McDermott, County Tyrone
- 1987, Sion Ní hAllmhuráin, County Clare
- 1988, Attracta Ní Bhradaigh, County Offaly
- 1989, Mary Jo Campbell, County Kildare
- 1990, Martina Bree, County Sligo
- 1991, Eleanor Carmody, County Kerry
- 1992, Colm O'Donnell, County Sligo
- 1993, Grace Kelly, Manchester, England
- 1994, Laurence Nugent, County Fermanagh
- 1995, Laurence Nugent, County Fermanagh
- 1996, Tríona Flavin, County Limerick
- 1997, Sandra Deegan, County Carlow
- 1998, Róisín Nic Dhonnacha, County Galway
- 1999, Emma O'Leary, County Kerry
- 2000, Mikie Smyth, County Dublin
- 2001, Louise Mulcahy, County Limerick
- 2002, Isaac Alderson, Chicago
- 2003, Emer Burke (Eimear De Burca), County Mayo
- 2004, Aidan O'Neill, County Tyrone
- 2005, Edward Looney, County Kerry
- 2006, Aisling McPhillips, County Fermanagh
- 2007, Cian Kearins, County Sligo
- 2008, Siobhan Ní Ógain (Siobhan Hogan), County Clare
- 2009, Yvonne Ward, County Leitrim
- 2010, Siobhán Ní Uirc (Joanne Quirke) County Cork
- 2011, Orlaith McAuliffe, London, England
- 2012, Seán Céitinn, County Cork
- 2013, Jillian Ní Mháille, County Mayo
- 2014, Yasmin Lynch, County Donegal
- 2015, James McCaffrey, County Tyrone
- 2016, Máire De Barra, County Mayo
- 2017, Seamus Ó Flatharta, County Galway
- 2018, Liam Ó Neadán, County Sligo
- 2019, Ciarán Mac Gearailt (FitzGerald), County Kildare
- 2022, Máire Ní Bhraonáin, County Offaly
- 2023, Cathal Ó hEachthairn, County Dublin
- 2024, Iarla McMahon, County Armagh
- 2025, Ellen de Búrca, County Cork
- 2026, Molly Pittendrigh, County Mayo

== Piano Accordion (Cairdín Pianó) ==
- 1953, Margaret Kane, County Carlow
- 1963, Wilcil McDowell, County Antrim
- 1964, Frank Kelly, County Roscommon
- 1965, Liam Gaul, Wexford
- 1966, K.Lawrie, Birmingham
- 1967, Liam Clarke, Dun Dealgon
- 1968, Mick Foster, Rathconrath
- 1969 K.Lawrie, Birmingham
- 1970, Mick Foster, Rathconrath
- 1971, Pat McCabe, Clones
- 1972, John Ferguson, Leeds
- 1973, John Ferguson, Leeds
- 1974, John Ferguson, Leeds
- 1975, Ann Morris, Boyle
- 1976, John Henry, County Londonderry
- 1977, Jimmy Keane, Chicago, USA
- 1978, Jimmy Keane, Chicago, USA
- 1979, John Gibney, Derby
- 1980, Mary Finn, Sligo
- 1981, Seamus Meehan, County Dublin
- 1982, Karen Tweed, Northampton
- 1983, Liam Roberts, County Dublin
- 1984, Noreen McQuaid, Monaghan
- 1985, Elaine McDermott, County Tyrone
- 1986, Collette O'Leary, Dublin
- 1987, Gearoid Ó hArgain (Ferard Horgan), County Cork
- 1988, Michael McDonagh, Luton
- 1989, Gerry Conlon, Glasgow
- 1990, Ger Maloney, Limerick
- 1991, Declan Payne, Sligo
- 1992, Michael Tennyson, Leeds
- 1993, Michael Tennyson, Leeds
- 1994, Michael Tennyson, Leeds
- 1995, Mirella Murray, Galway
- 1996, Andreas O Murchu, County Cork
- 1997, Marie Clarke, County Donegal
- 1998, Michelle O Leary, Manchester
- 1999, Michelle O Leary, Manchester
- 2000, Gearóid Mac Eogáin, County Monaghan
- 2001, Ann Mc Laughlin, County Donegal
- 2002, Colin McGill, County Laois
- 2003, Shane Ó hUaithne, County Galway
- 2004, David Nealon, County Galway
- 2005, Dean Warner, Leeds
- 2006, Amanda Ní Eochaidh, County Wexford
- 2007, Sinéad Healy, County Mayo
- 2008, Edel Mc Laughlin, County Donegal
- 2009, Caitríona Ní Choileáin, County Cork
- 2010, Seán Gavaghan, Leeds, Britain
- 2011, Seán Gavaghan, Leeds, Britain
- 2012, Adam Dyer, County Dublin
- 2013, Dónal Ó Coileáin, County Cork
- 2014, Kevin Murphy, Glasgow, Scotland
- 2015, Kevin Murphy, Glasgow, Scotland
- 2016, Kevin Murphy, Glasgow, Scotland
- 2017, Ryan Hackett, County Tyrone
- 2018, Rhianne Kelly, County Galway
- 2019, Fergal Bradley, County Donegal
- 2022, Shauneen Maguire, County Fermanagh
- 2023, Thomas Palmer, County Cork
- 2024, Michael Dudgeon, Scotland
- 2025, Séamus de Faoite, Louth
- 2026, Odhrán Keown, County Down

== Concertina (Consairtín) ==
- 1955, Paddy Murphy, County Clare
- 1956, Chris Droney, County Clare
- 1957, Paddy Murphy, County Clare
- 1958, Paddy Murphy, County Clare
- 1959, Chris Droney, County Clare
- 1960, Chris Droney, County Clare
- 1961, Chris Droney, County Clare
- 1962, Chris Droney, County Clare
- 1963, Chris Droney, County Clare
- 1964, Chris Droney, County Clare
- 1965, Chris Droney, County Clare
- 1966, Chris Droney, County Clare
- 1967, Chris Droney, County Clare
- 1968, Theresa White, County Waterford
- 1969, Tommy McMahon, County Clare
- 1970, Tommy McMahon, County Clare
- 1971, Tommy McMahon, County Clare
- 1975, Gerald Haugh, County Clare
- 1976, Father Charlie Coen, New York
- 1977, Father Charlie Coen, New York
- 1978, Paddy Hayes, London
- 1979, Mary MacNamara, County Clare
- 1980, Paddy Hayes, London
- 1981, D. Buckley, County Cork
- 1982 Gearóid Ó hAllmhuráin, County Clare
- 1983, Ciaran Burns, County Down
- 1984, Méabh Ní Lochlainn, Baile Átha Cliath
- 1985, Francis Droney, County Clare
- 1987, Paul Quinn, Camlough, County Armagh
- 1988, Elaine O'Sullivan, Coventry
- 1989, Johnny Williams, Chicago
- 1990, Micheal O'Raghallaigh, County Meath
- 1991, Dympna O'Sullivan, County Clare
- 1992, Eibhlín Ní Chonchubair, County Limerick
- 1993, Maura Walsh, County Kerry
- 1994, Grainne Hambly, County Mayo
- 1995, Brid Meaney, County Clare
- 1996, Antóin O Conaill, County Limerick
- 1997, Ernestine Ni Ealal, County Mayo
- 1998, Maedhbh Scahill, County Galway
- 1999, Séamus Ó Mongáin, County Mayo
- 2000, Triona Ní Aodha, County Kerry
- 2001, Triona Ní Aodha, County Kerry
- 2002, Hugh Healy, County Clare
- 2003, Holly NicOireachtaigh, County Mayo
- 2004, Aidan O'Neill, County Tyrone
- 2005, Alan Egan, County Kerry
- 2006, Máiréad Ní Uirthuile, County Sligo
- 2007, Rory McMahon, County Clare
- 2008, Aoife Ní Uaithne, County Galway
- 2009, Tomás Fitzharris, County Laois
- 2010, Breda Shannon, County Roscommon
- 2011, Aoibheann Murphy, County Cork
- 2012, Niamh Ní Shúilleabháin, County Dublin
- 2013, Róisín Ní Bhrudair, County Galway
- 2014, Ciaran Hanna, County Tyrone
- 2015, Paul Clesham, County Mayo
- 2016, Sinéad Mulqueen, County Clare
- 2017, Ciarán FitzGerald (Ciarán Mac Gearailt), County Kildare
- 2018, Sarán Mulligan, County Louth
- 2019, Aileen Bourke, County Mayo
- 2022, Aidan Quigney, County Clare
- 2023, Colm Browne, County Clare
- 2024, Chloe McGrath, County Mayo
- 2025, Erin Whitley, County Tyrone
- 2026 Caomhán Mac Gabhann, County Westmeath

== Uilleann Pipes (Píb Uilleann) ==
- 1951, Willie Clancy, County Clare
- 1952, Willie Reynolds, County Westmeath and John McAloon, County Fermanagh (tie)
- 1953, Willie Clancy, County Dublin
- 1954, Michael Padian, County Monaghan
- 1955, Dan Cleary, County Offaly
- 1956, Dan Cleary, County Offaly
- 1957, Dan Cleary, County Offaly
- 1958, Pat McNulty, Glasgow, Scotland (formerly of County Donegal)
- 1959, Thomas Kearney, County Waterford
- 1960, Seán Mac Cormac, County Westmeath
- 1965, Michael Falsey, County Clare
- 1964, Liam O'Flynn Fleadh Cheoil na hÉireann Clones
- 1966, Finbar Furey
- 196?, Tomás Ó Ceannabháin, County Galway
- 1973, Tom Walsh, Preston, Lancashire
- 1974, Gabriel McKeon, County Dublin
- 1975, Finbar McLaughlin, City of Derry
- 1976, Trevor Stewart, County Antrim
- 1977, Joseph McHugh, City of Derry
- 1979, Brian Stafford, City of Derry
- 1981, D. Buckley
- 1980, Mattie Connolly, County Monaghan/New York
- 1982, Seamus Meehan, Dublin
- 1983, Michael Cooney, County Tipperary
- 1984, Fergus Finnegan, County Dublin
- 1985, Fergus Finnegan, County Dublin
- 1986, Eamonn Walsh, Ballina, County Mayo
- 1987, Martin Frain, Sheffield, UK
- 1990, Brendan Ring, London
- 1991, Tiarnán Ó Duinchinn, County Monaghan
- 1992, David Power, County Waterford
- 1993, Brian Mac Aodha, County Leitrim.
- 1997, Flaithrí Neff, County Cork
- 1998, David Kinsella, County Offaly
- 1999, Audrey Cunningham, County Wicklow
- 2000, Mikie Smyth, County Dublin
- 2001, Louise Mulcahy, County Limerick
- 2002, Isaac Alderson, Chicago
- 2003, Martin Crossin, County Donegal
- 2004, Richard Murray, County Galway
- 2005, James Mahon, County Dublin
- 2006, Éanna Ó Cróinín, County Meath
- 2007, Seán McCarthy, County Cork
- 2008, Fiachra Ó Riagáin, County Galway
- 2009, Martino Vacca, County Limerick
- 2010, Richard Neylon, County Galway
- 2011, Éanna Ó Chróinín, County Meath
- 2012, Seán Céitinn, County Cork
- 2013, Conor Mallon, County Armagh
- 2014, Cathal Ó Crócaigh, County Dublin
- 2015, Tara Howley, County Clare
- 2016, Fionn Morrison, County Dublin
- 2017, Eoin Orr, County Donegal
- 2018, Timmy Flaherty, CCÉ, Ballylongford / Tarbert, Ciarraí
- 2019, Ruairí Howell, County Down
- 2022, Peter McKenna, County Tyrone
- 2023, Micheál Fitzgibbon, County Limerick
- 2024, Lachlan McKibbin, County Down
- 2025, Jane Walls, County Antrim
- 2026, Cormac Keegan, County Kildare

== Harp (Cruit) ==
- 1959, Philomena O'Keeffe, County Cork
- 1974, Deirdre Danaher, New York City, USA
- 1975, Maire Ni Chathasaigh, County Cork
- 1976, Maire Ni Chathasaigh, County Cork
- 1977, Maire Ni Chathasaigh, County Cork
- 1979, Patricia Daly, County Armagh
- 1980, Sylvia Woods, California, USA
- 1981, Janet Harbison, County Dublin
- 1982, Mairéad Ní Chathasaigh, County Cork
- 1983, Celia Joyce, Preston, Lancashire, England
- 1984, Shawna Culotta, California, USA
- 1985, Kathleen Guilday, Boston, USA
- 1986, Martha Clancy, Philadelphia, USA
- 1987, Eimear Ní Bhroin, County Cork
- 1989, Tracey Fleming, County Roscommon
- 1990, Cormac de Barra, County Dublin
- 1991, Mark Kelly, County Kilkenny
- 1992, Laoise Ní Cheallaigh (Laoise Kelly), County Mayo
- 1993, Michael Rooney, County Monaghan
- 1994, Gráinne Hambly, County Mayo
- 1996, Padraigín Caesar, County Carlow
- 1997, Áine Heneghan, County Mayo
- 1998, Barbra Doyle, County Kildare
- 1999, Freda Nic Ghiolla Chathain, County Westmeath
- 2000, Eileen Gannon, St. Louis
- 2001, Holly Nic Oireachtaigh, County Mayo
- 2002, Nicola Ní Chathail, County Galway
- 2003, Fionnuala Ní Ruanaidh, County Monaghan
- 2004, Méabh de Buitléir, County Clare
- 2005, Seana Ní Dhaithí, County Meath
- 2006, Lucy Kerr, City of Derry
- 2007, Aedin Martin, County Dublin
- 2008, Lisa Ní Cheannaigh (Lisa Canny), County Mayo
- 2009, Oisín Morrison. County Dublin
- 2010, AnnaLee Foster, Oregon, USA
- 2011, Aoife Ní Argáin, County Dublin
- 2012, Alisha McMahon, County Clare
- 2013, Áine Ní Shiocháin, County Limerick
- 2014, Eimear Coughlan, County Clare
- 2015, Gráinne Nic Ghiobúin, County Limerick
- 2016, Niamh McGloin, County Sligo
- 2017, Seamus Ó Flatharta, County Galway
- 2018, Síofra Hanley, County Sligo
- 2019, Fionnuala Donlon, County Louth
- 2022, Emma Benson, County Roscommon
- 2023, Hamish O'Carroll, County Kerry
- 2024, Hannah Lyons, County Mayo
- 2026, Rachael Dooley, Co. Louth

== Mouth Organ (Orgán Béil) ==
- 1959, P. O'Dolphin, Athlone
- 1966, Thomas McGovern, County Leitrim
- 1967, Dick O'Neill, County Wexford
- 1969, Phil Murphy, County Wexford
- 1970, Phil Murphy, County Wexford
- 1971, Phil Murphy, County Wexford
- 1972, Leo Carthy, County Wexford
- 1973, John Murphy, County Wexford
- 1974, Mary Brogan, County Wexford
- 1975, Rick Epping, USA
- 1976, Gerard Danaher, County Sligo
- 1977, Mary Brogan, County Wexford
- 1979, Kieran McHugh, County Antrim
- 198?, Pip Murphy, County Wexford (twice)
- 1981, P. J. Gannon, St. Louis, USA
- 1983, Mick Furlong, County Wexford
- 1984, Nicky Furlong, Wexford
- 1985, Noel Battle, County Westmeath
- 1986, Pip Murphy, County Wexford
- 1987, Don Meade, New York, USA
- 1993, Brendan Power, New Zealand
- 1994 Alan O'Dwyer, County Wexford
- 1995 Alan O'Dwyer, County Wexford
- 1996, Austin Berry, County Roscommon
- 1997, Austin Berry, County Roscommon
- 1998, Austin Berry, County Roscommon
- 1999, Tomás Ó Tuathail, County Mayo
- 2000, Paul Moran, County Galway
- 2001, Noel Battle, County Westmeath
- 2002, Noel Battle, County Westmeath
- 2003, Noel Battle, County Westmeath
- 2004, Noel Battle, County Westmeath
- 2005, Edward Looney, County Kerry
- 2006, Pauline Callinan, County Clare
- 2007, Nollaig Mac Concatha, County Meath
- 2008, Pat Casey, County Tyrone
- 2009, Pat Casey, County Tyrone
- 2010, Pat Casey, County Tyrone
- 2011, Orla Ward, County Leitrim
- 2012, Poilín Ní Ghabháin (Pauline Callinan), County Clare
- 2013, John Horkan, County Mayo
- 2014, John Horkan, County Mayo
- 2015, Denis Nolan, County Wexford
- 2016, John Horkan, County Mayo
- 2017, Pat Fulton, County Offaly
- 2018, John Horkan, County Mayo
- 2019, Arlene O'Sullivan, County Clare
- 2022, Liam MacThómais, County Tipperary
- 2023, Michael Kelliher, County Kerry
- 2024, Pauline Callinan, County Clare
- 2026 John Horkan, County Mayo

== Banjo (Bainseo) ==
- 1971, Mick O'Connor, London
- 1974, Owen Hackett, County Meath
- 1975, S. O’Hagen, County Tyrone
- 1976, Tony "Sully" Sullivan, Manchester
- 1977, Kieran Hanrahan, County Clare
- 1978, James (Kevin) Shanahan, London
- 1979, Willie Kavanagh, County Longford
- 1981, John Hogan, Arklow County Wicklow, (Gorey CCE)
- 1982, John Carty, London
- 1983, Cathal Hayden, County Tyrone
- 1984, Cathal Hayden, County Tyrone
- 1985, Noel Birmingham, County Clare
- 1987, Tomas Ó Maoilean, County Galway
- 1988, Pat Bass, County Wexford
- 1990, Lorraine Ely, Luton
- 1991, Pat Bass, County Wexford
- 1992, Pat Bass, County Wexford
- 1993, Joe Molloy, Birmingham
- 1994, John Morrow, County Leitrim
- 1995, Theresa O'Grady, Luton
- 1996, Paul Meehan, County Armagh
- 1997, Brian Fitzgerald, County Limerick
- 1998, Colm O hUaithnin, County Tipperary
- 1999, Brian Kelly, Birmingham
- 2000, Kerri Ní Oireachtaigh, County Sligo
- 2001, Alan Byrne, County Dublin
- 2002, Kieran Fletcher, County Armagh
- 2003, Clíodhna Ní Choisdealbha, County Tipperary
- 2004, Aisling Neville, County Kerry
- 2005, Éamonn Ó Murchú, County Cork
- 2006, Michael Gaughan, CCÉ, West London
- 2007, Gearóid Céitinn, County Limerick
- 2008, Steven Madden, County Clare
- 2009, Eoin O'Sullivan, County Limerick
- 2010, Eimear Howley, County Clare
- 2011, Dermot Mulholland, City of Derry
- 2012, Con Mahon, County Offaly
- 2013, Tomas Quinn, County Tyrone
- 2014, Elaine Reilly, County Longford
- 2015, George McAdam, County Monaghan
- 2016, Gearoid Curtin, County Kerry
- 2017, Brian Scannell, County Limerick
- 2018, Dean Ó Gríofa, County Kerry
- 2019, Shane Scanlon, County Cork
- 2022, Thomas Ahern, County Waterford
- 2023, Ademar O'Connor, County Offaly
- 2024, Patrick Treacy, County Fermanagh
- 2025, Oisín Reilly, County Monaghan
- 2026, Aodhán Hughes, County Mayo

== Mandolin (Maindilín) ==
- 1979, Séamus Egan, Pennsylvania
- 1980, Stephen Daly, Dublin
- 1989, Stephen Daly, Dublin
- 1990, Terence Matthews, County Kerry
- 1991, Pat Bass, County Wexford
- 1992, Pat Bass, County Wexford
- 1994, John Morrow, County Leitrim
- 1995, Sean Marshall, County Longford
- 1996, Brian Carolan, County Meath
- 1997, Brian Kelly, London
- 1998, Colm O hUaithnin, County Tipperary
- 1999, Kate Marquis, County Monaghan
- 2000, Kate Marquis, County Monaghan
- 2001, Daithí Ó Cearnaigh, County Kerry
- 2002, Shane Mulchrone, County Mayo
- 2003, Piaras MacEochagáin, County Kerry
- 2004, Alan Tierney, County Galway
- 2005, Aaron Mc Sorley, County Tyrone
- 2006, Frances Donahue, County Cork
- 2007, Michael Gaughan, West London
- 2008, Eimear Ní hAmhlaigh, County Clare
- 2009, Ryan McCourt, County Antrim
- 2010, Gavin Strappe, County Tipperary
- 2011, Sandra Walsh, County Cork
- 2012, Séamus Ó Ciarba, County Clare
- 2013, Danny Collins, County Cork
- 2014, Elaine Reilly, County Longford
- 2015, George McAdam, County Monaghan
- 2016, Richie Delahunty, County Tipperary
- 2017, Darragh Carey Kennedy, County Tipperary
- 2018, Oisin Murphy, County Monaghan
- 2019, Shane Scanlon, County Cork
- 2022, Tiarnán O'Connell, County Dublin
- 2023, Graeme Sargent, County Tipperary
- 2024, Cillian Cullen, County Wexford
- 2026, Micheál Ó Brúdair, County Limerick

== Piano ==
- 1960, Brendan Gaughran, County Louth
- 1961, Brendan Gaughran, County Louth
- 1962, Brendan Gaughran, County Louth
- 1969, Declan Foley, County Waterford
- 1972, James McCorry, County Armagh
- 1974, Liam Reilly, County Louth
- 1975, K.Taylor, London, Britain
- 1976, Mary Corcoran, County Dublin
- 1977, Geraldine Cotter, County Clare
- 1979, Mary McNamara, County Clare
- 1980, Seamus O'Sullivan, Glasgow, Scotland
- 1983, Carol Talty, County Clare
- 1984, Gerry Conlon, Glasgow
- 1985, Brendan Moran, Leigh, Greater Manchester, UK
- 1986, Gerry Conlon, Glasgow, Scotland
- 1987, Nora Byrne, County Wexford
- 1989, Gerry Conlon, Glasgow, Scotland
- 1990, Seamus O'Sullivan, Glasgow, Scotland
- 1991, Caroline Ní Mhurchú, County Cork
- 1995, Adrian Scahill, County Galway
- 1996, Aindreas O Murchú, County Cork
- 1997, Caitriona Cullivan, County Cavan
- 1998, Padraig O Reilly, County Clare
- 1999, Caitriona Cullivan, County Cavan
- 2000, Ita Cunningham, County Galway
- 2001, Paul Ryan, County Tipperary
- 2002, Mary McMahon, County Galway
- 2003, Adele Farrell, Manchester
- 2004, David Nealon, County Galway
- 2005, Caitríona Cullivan, County Cavan
- 2005, David Nealon, County Galway
- 2006, Aidan O’Neill, County Tyrone
- 2007, Amanda Nic Eochaidh, County Wexford
- 2008, Amanda Nic Eochaidh, County Wexford
- 2009, Déirdre O Reilly, County Cavan
- 2010, Gearóid Mac Giollarnáth, County Galway
- 2011, Adam Dyer, County Dublin
- 2012, Tadhg Ó Meachair, County Dublin
- 2013, Edel McLaughlin, County Donegal
- 2014, Connor Kiernan, County Cavan
- 2015, Mark Mac Criostail, County Tyrone
- 2016, David Browne, Glasgow, Scotland
- 2017, Rebecca McCarthy Kent, County Waterford
- 2018, James Hogan, County Offaly
- 2019, Hannah Collins, County Cork
- 2022, Barry Conaty, County Cavan
- 2023, Calum McGregor, Glasgow, Scotland
- 2024, Áine Nolan, County Limerick
- 2025, Grace Angland, County Kerry
- 2026, Éabha McInerney, County Clare

== Melodeon (Mileoideon) ==
- 1981, Sean Norman, Co Offaly
- 1982, Johnny Bass, County Wexford
- 1983, Brendan Begley, County Dublin
- 1984, Johnny Bass, County Wexford
- 1985, Padraig O Coill, County Wexford
- 1986, Caroline Judge, St. Albans
- 1987, Diarmuid Ó Cathain, County Kerry
- 1988, John Bass, County Wexford
- 1989, John Bass, County Wexford
- 1991, Bill O'Toole, County Galway
- 1993, Martin Hickey, County Offaly
- 1995, Oliver Diviney, County Galway
- 1996, Oliver Diviney, County Galway
- 1997, Peadar Mac Eli, County Mayo
- 1998, Oliver Diviney, County Galway
- 1999, John Bass, County Wexford
- 2000, Sharon Carroll, County Offaly
- 2001, Caitríona O'Brien, County Wicklow
- 2002, Caitríona O'Brien, County Wicklow
- 2003, Caitríona O'Brien, County Wicklow
- 2004, Niamh Brett, County Roscommon
- 2005, Damien Mullane, West London, England
- 2006, Daire Mulhern, County Clare
- 2007, Noel Clancy, County Waterford
- 2008, Christopher Maguire, County Fermanagh
- 2009, Connor Moriarty, County Kerry
- 2010, Damien McGuiness, County Sligo
- 2011, Seán Ó Maoilmhíchíl, County Limerick
- 2012, Aonghus Ó Maicín, County Mayo
- 2013, Dónal Ó Linneacháin, County Cork
- 2014, Caoimhe Millar, County Clare
- 2016, Diarmuid O' Meachair, County Cork
- 2017, Seamus Tiernan, County Mayo
- 2018, Colm Slattery, County Tipperary
- 2019, Steven O Leary, County Kerry
- 2022, Liam Browne, County Clare
- 2023, Joseph Mannion, County Waterford
- 2024, Ciara Tighe, County Clare
- 2026, Michael Healy, County Kerry

== Miscellaneous (Rogha Gléas) ==
- 1954, Paddy Murphy, County Clare
- 1955, L. Ó Donnachadha, County Galway
- 1957, Willie Joe Power, County Wexford
- 1965, Tim Flood, County Wexford
- 1971, Mike O'Connor, UK;
- 1975, S. Epping, County Xxxxx
- 1976, Joe Noonan, County Limerick
- 1977, Tomas O’Cinneide, County Tipperary
- 1979, Seamus Logan, County Antrim
- 1983, Jim Egan, County Tipperary
- 1984, David Mc Nevin, Dublin
- 1985, Colman Nugent, County Waterford
- 1987, Karen Tweed, London
- 1989, David James, South Bend, Indiana, USA
- 1992, Paul McGlinchey, County Tyrone
- 1993, Brendan Power, New Zealand
- 1994, John Morrow, County Leitrim
- 1995, Dawn Doherty, County Mayo
- 1996, Majella Bartley, County Monaghan
- 1997, Trudy O Donnell, County Donegal
- 1998, Caitriona Ni Chlochassaigh, County Limerick
- 1999, Seán Ó Murchú, County Mayo
- 2000, Séan Bass, County Wexford
- 2001, Aishling McPhillips, County Fermanagh
- 2002, David James, South Bend, Indiana
- 2003, Pat O’Donnell, County Limerick
- 2004, Fionnbarra Mac Riabhaigh, County Roscommon
- 2005, Edward Looney, County Kerry
- 2006, Pádraig Mac Giolla Phádraig, County Wexford
- 2007, Billy Dowling, County Offaly
- 2008, Eimear Ní hAmhlaigh, County Clare
- 2009, Tara Breen, County Clare
- 2010, Gavin Strappe, County Tipperary
- 2011, Arthur O'Connor, County Offaly
- 2012, Jens Kommnick, Germany
- 2013, Eimer Arkins, County Clare
- 2014, Alan Finn, County Cork
- 2015, Daniel Delaney, County Kilkenny
- 2016, Richie Delahunty, County Tipperary
- 2017, Tadhg Mulligan, County Louth
- 2018, Claire Ann Kearns, County Offaly
- 2019, Darragh Carey Kennedy, County Tipperary
- 2022, Sarah O'Gorman, County Waterford
- 2023, Oisín McCann, County Down
- 2024, Ademar O'Connor, County Offaly
- 2025, Owen Smith, County Longford
- 2026, Abigail O'Brien, County Dublin

== Accompaniment (Tionlacán) ==
- 1994, Adrian Scahill, County Galway
- 1995, Michael Rooney, County Monaghan
- 1996, Verena Commins, Leeds CCE
- 1997, Kevin Brehony, County Sligo
- 1998, Annmarie Acosta, United States
- 1999, Aisling Ní Choisdealbha, Tipperary
- 2000, Séan Farrell, County Limerick
- 2001, Marta Cook, Chicago, USA
- 2002, Michael O'Rourke, County Clare
- 2003, Marie Walsh, County Galway
- 2004, Johnny Berrill, County Galway
- 2005, Paul McMahon, County Louth
- 2006, Stiofán Ó Marchaim, County Clare
- 2007, Caruilín Ní Shúilleabháin, County Wexford
- 2008, Cathy Potter, County Antrim
- 2009, Joshua Dukes, Silver Spring, Maryland, USA
- 2010, Ronan Warnock, County Tyrone
- 2011, Elvie Miller, County Clare
- 2012, Jens Kommnick, Germany
- 2013, Catherine McHugh, County Galway
- 2014, Marc Mac Criostail, County Tyrone
- 2015, Paul Clesham, County Mayo
- 2016, Sinead Mulqueen, County Clare
- 2017, David Browne, Glasgow, Scotland
- 2018, Jack Warnock, City of Derry
- 2019, Eddie Kiely, County Cork
- 2022, Ryan Ward, New York, USA
- 2023, Rory McEvoy, County Down
- 2024, Cathal Culliney, County Longford
- 2026, Eamon Sefton, Boston, USA

== Bodhrán ==
- 1973, John O'Dwyer, Leeds
- 1975, Johnny McDonagh, County Galway
- 1976, Tommy Hayes, County Limerick
- 1977, Gerry Enright, County Limerick
- 1979, Vincent Short, Lancashire
- 1981 Michael Lawler, County Wexford
- 1982, Padhraic Egan, County Dublin
- 1983, Michael Lawler, County Wexford
- 1984, Michael Lawler County Wexford
- 1985, Maurice Griffin, County Tipperary
- 1986, Fabian Ó Murchu, County Cork
- 1987, Fabian Ó Murchu, County Cork
- 1988 Máirtín Mac Aodha, (Glasgow)
- 1989, Fabian Ó Murphy, County Cork
- 1990 Martin Meehan (12-15), County Armagh
- 1992 Máirtín Mac Aodha, (Glasgow)
- 1994 Martin Saunders, County Carlow
- 1995, Mark Maguire, Glasgow, Scotland
- 1996, Junior Davey, County Sligo
- 1997, Junior Davey, County Sligo
- 1998, Peter O Brien, London
- 1999, Aindrias Mac Dáibhí, County Sligo
- 2000, Séan Ó Dulaing, County Kilkenny
- 2001, Ciarán Leahy, County Cork
- 2002, Martin O'Neill, Glasgow
- 2003, Paul Phillips, County Down
- 2004, Serena Curley, County Galway
- 2005, Siobhan O’ Donnell, County Sligo
- 2006, Séan O’Neill, County Down
- 2007, Sinead Curley, County Galway
- 2008, Robbie Walsh, County Dublin
- 2009, Máirtín Mac Aodha. County Offaly
- 2010, Niall Preston, County Dublin
- 2011, Kieran Leonard, County Fermanagh
- 2012, Paul McClure, County Donegal
- 2013, Conor Mairtin, County Meath
- 2014, Dale McKay, County Laois
- 2015, Danny Collins, County Cork
- 2016, Sean O' Neill, County Down
- 2017, James O’Connor, County Limerick
- 2018, Niamh Fennell, County Waterford
- 2019, James O'Connor, County Limerick
- 2022, Daire Smith, County Cavan
- 2023, Ciaran Maguire, County Monaghan
- 2026, Aoibheann Ní Dhrisceoll, County Cork

== Céilí Band Drummer (Drumaí Céilí) ==
- 1969, Mick Kavanagh, County Wexford
- 1970, Mick Kavanagh, County Wexford
- 1973, Billy Dwyer, County Wexford
- 1974, Gerarde Dawe, County Louth
- 1975, A. Vaughan, County Clare
- 1976, Donal O’Connor, County Sligo
- 1977, Billy Dwyer, County Wexford
- 1979, Billy Dwyer, County Wexford
- 1982, Billy Dwyer, County Wexford
- 1983, Micheal Heir, County Clare
- 1985, Debbie Conneely, Manchester
- 1986, Mark Maguire, Glasgow, Scotland
- 1987, Mark Maguire, Glasgow, Scotland
- 1988, Mark Maguire, Glasgow, Scotland
- 1989, Mark Maguire, Glasgow, Scotland
- 1990, Mark Maguire, Glasgow, Scotland
- 1992, Mark Maguire, Glasgow, Scotland
- 1994, Mark Maguire, Glasgow, Scotland
- 1993, Jimmy Kavanagh, County Wexford
- 1995, Mark Maguire, Glasgow, Scotland
- 1996, Brian Walsh, County Monaghan
- 1997, Brian Walsh, County Monaghan
- 1998, Darragh Kelly, County Sligo
- 1999, Aidan Flood, County Longford
- 2000, Brian Breathnach, County Monaghan
- 2001, Aidan Flood, County Longford
- 2002, Kevin O'Neill, Glasgow
- 2003, Aidan Flood, County Longford
- 2004, Brian Walsh, County Monaghan
- 2005, Martin Murphy, County Longford
- 2006, Darragh Kelly, County Sligo
- 2007, Seán Ó Broin, County Waterford
- 2008, Charline Brady, County Fermanagh
- 2009, Charline Brady, County Fermanagh
- 2010, Pádraig Ó Maolcathaigh, County Limerick
- 2011, Kieran Leonard, County Fermanagh
- 2012, Damien McGuinness, County Sligo
- 2013, Brian Walsh, County Monaghan
- 2014, Brian Walsh, County Monaghan
- 2015, Jason McGuinness, County Sligo
- 2016, Eoghan Mac Giollachroist, County Longford
- 2017, Michael Sheridan, County Sligo
- 2018, Conor Moore, County Wexford
- 2019, Conor Hartnett, County Tipperary
- 2022, Mark Vesey, County Laois
- 2023, Amy Cullen, County Sligo
- 2024, Cathal Magee, County Down
- 2025, Oisín Reilly, County Monaghan
- 2026, Nadine Smith, County Longford

== War Pipes (Piob Mhór) ==
- 1953 P. Ó Gregain, County Dublin
- 1955 Francis Vaughan, County Clare
- 1973 Denis Nagle, County Kerry
- 1974, Michael O’Malley, London
- 1975, Michael O’Malley, London
- 1976, Michael O’Malley, London
- 1977, Br. Vincent, County Sligo
- 1979, James Finnegan, London
- 1981 Pat Fitzpatrick, County Wexford
- 1983, Rory Somers, County Mayo
- 1984, Larry O Dowd, Sligo
- 1985, Sarah Fitzpatrick, County Wexford
- 1987, Denis O'Reilly, County Kerry
- 1993, Shane O'Neill, County Tyrone
- 1996, Danny Houlihan, County Kerry
- 1997, Danny Houlihan, County Kerry
- 1998, Martin McAndrew, Chicago
- 1999, Danny Houlihan, County Kerry
- 2000, Danny Houlihan, County Kerry
- 2001, Danny Houlihan, County Kerry
- 2002, Danny Houlihan, County Kerry
- 2004, Greg Robbin, London
- 2005, Conal McNamara, County Galway
- 2006, Rachel Corr, County Tyrone
- 2007, No Competitors
- 2008, Lisa Farber, New Jersey, USA
- 2009, Lisa Farber, New Jersey, USA
- 2010, David Stone, County Waterford
- 2011, Owen Smith, County Longford
- 2012, Owen Smith, County Longford
- 2013, Owen Smith, County Longford
- 2014, Owen Smith, County Longford
- 2015, Owen Smith, County Longford
- 2016, Owen Smith, County Longford
- 2017, Owen Smith, County Longford
- 2018, Owen Smith, County Longford
- 2019, Owen Smith, County Longford
- 2020, Owen Smith, County Longford
- 2021, Owen Smith, County Longford
- 2022, Meabh Connolly, County Cavan
- 2023, Daire Smith, County Cavan
- 2024, Owen Smith, County Longford
- 2025, Seamus Tierney, County Cavan
- 2026, Conor Harnett, County Tipperary

== Fiddle - Slow Airs (Fidil/Veidhlín - Foinn Mhalla) ==
- 1971, Tony Lineen, County Wexford
- 1975, P. Ó Coill, County Xxxxx
- 1974, Tony Lineen, County Wexford
- 1976, Ann O'Brien, County Antrim
- 1977, Nollaig Ní Chathasaigh, County Cork
- 1979, John O'Sullivan, County Kilkenny
- 1981. Tommy McGoldrick, County Antrim
- 1982. Mary Greevy, County Roscommon.
- 1983, Frances Nesbitt, County Tipperary
- 1984, Frances Nesbitt, County Tipperary
- 1985, Frances Nesbitt, County Tipperary
- 1986, Timmy O'Shea, County Kerry
- 1987, Michael Ó hÉineacháin, County Mayo
- 1988, Colm Crummey, County Antrim
- 1992, Brenda McCann, County Fermanagh
- 1993, Joseph Toolan, County Dublin
- 1994, Alice Wickham, County Wexford
- 1995, Maria Gleeson, County Limerick
- 1996, Kieran Convery, County Antrim
- 1997, Breda Keville, Leeds, UK
- 1998, Lisa Ní Choisdealbha, County Tipperary
- 1999, Emma O' Leary, County Kerry
- 2000, Tomás Mac Aogáin, County Wexford
- 2001, Cathal Ó Clochasaigh, County Limerick
- 2002, Eleanor Keane, Glasgow, Scotland
- 2003, Kira Jewett, New Jersey, USA
- 2004, Clár Ní Chuinn, County Tipperary
- 2005, Marion Collins, County Cork
- 2006, Pádraig Creedon, County Kerry
- 2007, Niall McClean, County Down
- 2008, Áine Sinéad Ní Riain (Anna Jane Ryan), County Limerick
- 2009, Tara Breen, County Clare
- 2010, Courtney Cullen, County Wicklow
- 2011, Lydia Warnock, County Leitrim
- 2012, Clár Breathnach, County Dublin
- 2013, Caitríona Ní Luasa, County Cork
- 2014, Donál Ó Beoláin, County Westmeath
- 2015, Lucia Mac Partlin, County Tipperary
- 2016, Éadaoin Ní Mhaicín, County Mayo
- 2017, Jake James, New York, USA
- 2018, Jason McGuinness, County Sligo
- 2019, Sarah O'Gorman, County Waterford
- 2022, Una McGlinchey, County Tyrone
- 2023, Cillian Ó Cathasaigh, County Cork
- 2026 Maebh McGlinchey, County Tyrone

== Uilleann Pipes - Slow Airs (Píb Uilleann - Foinn Mhalla) ==
- 1985, Eamonn Walsh, County Mayo
- 1973, Seamus MacMathuna, County Wexford
- 1975, Seamus Casey, London
- 1976, Seamus Casey, London
- 1977, (only 1 competitor)
- 1979, Gearóid Ó hAllmhuráin, County Clare
- 1983, Brian McComb, Blackburn, Lancashire, England
- 1984, Eamonn Walsh, Dublin
- 1985, Brian McNamara, County Leitrim
- 1986, Andrew Murphy, Poulton-le-fylde, Lancashire, England
- 1987, Mark Donnelly (Deceased), County Armagh
- 1989 Ciaran Crotty County Dublin
- 1991, Tommy Martin, County Dublin
- 1992, Patrick Hutchinson, USA
- 1993, Brian Mac Aodha, County Leitrim.
- 1995, Padraig Sinnott, County Wexford
- 1996, Máire de Cogáin, County Cork
- 1997, Flaithrí Neff, County Cork
- 1998, Sean Ryan, USA
- 1999, Audrey Cunningham, County Wicklow
- 2000, Mikie Smyth, County Dublin
- 2001, Louise Mulcahy, County Limerick
- 2002, Isaac Alderson, Chicago
- 2003, Sinéad O'Shiel Flemming, County Laois
- 2004, Richard Murray, County Galway
- 2005, James Mahon, County Dublin
- 2006, Éanna Ó Cróinín, County Galway
- 2007, Seán McCarthy, County Cork
- 2008, Fiachra Ó Riagáin, County Galway
- 2009, Martino Vacca, County Limerick
- 2010, Richard Neylon, County Galway
- 2011, Éanna Ó Cróinín, County Meath
- 2012, Seán Céitinn, County Cork
- 2013, Torrin Ryan, Massachusetts, USA
- 2014, Patrick Hutchinson, Massachusetts, USA
- 2015, Tara Howley, County Clare
- 2016, Siobhán Hogan, County Galway
- 2017, Conall Duffy, County Louth
- 2018, Conor Murphy, County Dublin
- 2019, Eoin Orr, County Donegal
- 2022, Alain Ó Cearúil, County Laois
- 2023, Micheál Fitzgibbon, County Limerick
- 2024, Lachlan McKibbin, County Down
- 2026, Liam Mac Giobún, County Limerick

== Flute - Slow Airs (Feadóg Mhór - Foinn Mhalla) ==
- 1975, John Lewis, County Galway
- 1976, Ann O’Brien, County Antrim??
- 1977, Des Leech, County Dublin
- 1979, Páraic Ó Lochlainn, County Dublin
- 1980, Damhnait Nic Suibhne, County Donegal
- 1981 Neansaí Ní Choisdealbha, County Galway
- 1983, Meadhbh Ní Lochlainn, County Dublin
- 1984, Tom Hanafin, County Kerry
- 1985, Julia Nicholas, St. Helens, Merseyside, UK
- 1987, Kathleen Ford, County Donegal
- 1988, Michael Griffin, County Wexford
- 1991, Paul McGlinchey, County Tyrone
- 1994, Peig Needham, County Louth
- 1995, Maureen Shannon, USA
- 1996, Fiona Butler, County Kilkenny
- 1997, Catriona Ni Chlochasaigh, County Limerick
- 1998, Aoife Ni Ghrainbhil, County Kerry
- 1999, Ciaran McGuinness, County Longford
- 2000, Attracta Brady, County Offaly
- 2001, Áine Ní Dhé, County Kerry
- 2002, Seacailín Ní Ealaithe, County Limerick
- 2003, Maidhc Ó hÉanaigh, County Galway
- 2004, Frances Donahue, County Galway
- 2005, Richard Neylon, County Galway
- 2006, Sinéad Fahey, County Waterford
- 2007, Christina Dolphin, County Dublin
- 2008, Audrey Ní Murchú, County Westmeath
- 2009, Matthew Dean, Villa Real, Castellan, Spain
- 2010, Breda Shannon, County Roscommon
- 2011, Eibhlís Ní Shúilleabháin, County Cork
- 2012, Órlaith McAuliffe, London, England
- 2013, Jillian Ní Mháille, County Mayo
- 2014, Máiréad Ní Chiaraigh, County Cork
- 2015, Maura O'Brien, County Tipperary
- 2016, Cailín O'Shea, County Kerry
- 2017, Ciarán FitzGerald (Ciarán Mac Gearailt), County Kildare.
- 2018, Claire Fennell, County Waterford
- 2019, Conor Maheady, County Mayo
- 2022, Donnchadh Mac Aodha, County Louth
- 2023, Karl Doherty, County Donegal
- 2024, Áine Teape, County Cork
- 2025, Ruairi Griffin, County Cavan
- 2026, Molly Pittendrigh, County Mayo

== Tin Whistle - Slow Airs (Feadóg Stáin - Foinn MhaIla) ==
- 1974, Kevin Whitty, County Wexford
- 1975, Willis Patton, County Antrim
- 1976, Carmel Gunning, County Sligo
- 1977, Kevin Whitty, County Wexford
- 1979, Chalmers Brown, County Down
- 1983, Mairéad Ní Chathasaigh, County Cork
- 1984, Tom Hanafin, County Kerry
- 1985, Michel Sikiotakis, Paris, France
- 1993, Maggie McCarty, County Limerick
- 1994, Maggie McCarty, County Limerick
- 1995, Maggie McCarty, County Limerick
- 1996, Fiona Butler, County Kilkenny
- 1997, Majella Bartley, County Monaghan
- 1998, Róisín Nic Dhonnacha, County Galway
- 1989, Lorraine Mc Mahon, County Louth
- 1999, Emma O'Leary, County Kerry
- 2000, Caitríona Ní Mhaoldomhnaigh, County Limerick
- 2001, Noreen Ní Mhurchú, County Cork
- 2002, Sacra Ní Fhuardha, County Galway
- 2003, Linda Ní Bheirn, County Roscommon
- 2004, Sinéad Fahy, County Waterford
- 2005, Julie Ann McCafferty, County Fermanagh
- 2006, Fiachra Ó Riagáin, County Galway
- 2007, Pól Ó Rúis, County Roscommon
- 2008, Edel McLaughlin, County Donegal
- 2009, Audrey Murphy, County Westmeath
- 2010, Audrey Murphy, County Westmeath
- 2011, Siobhan Ni Uirc (Joanne Quirke) County Cork
- 2012, Audrey Ní Mhurcú, County Westmeath
- 2013, Yasmin Lynch, County Donegal
- 2014, Maura Ní Bhriain, County Tipperary
- 2015, Siobhán Ní Chonchuirr, County Donegal
- 2016, Ciarán FitzGerald (Ciarán Mac Gearailt), County Kildare
- 2017, Cárl Ó' Dochartaigh, (Karl Doherty), County Donegal
- 2018, Brendan Rowan, County Meath
- 2019, Padraig Enright, County Kerry
- 2022, Grainne Ní Mhuineog, County Offaly
- 2026, Florence Donohoe, County Wexford

== Harp - Slow Airs (Cruit - Foinn Mhalla) ==
- 2011, Déirdre Ní Ghrainbhil, County Kerry
- 2012, Fiana Ní Chonaill, County Limerick
- 2013, Emily Gaine, County Sligo
- 2014, Eimear Coughlan, County Clare
- 2015, Siobhán Ní Bhuachalla, County Cork
- 2016, Kerri Ní Mhaoláin, (Kerri Mullan) City of Derry
- 2017, Seamus O Flatharta, County Galway
- 2018, Una Ní Fhlannagáin, County Galway
- 2019, Siofra Thornton, County Tipperary
- 2022, Éilís Ní Néadáin, County Sligo
- 2023, Sal Heneghan, County Mayo
- 2024, Aoibhe Kettle, County Laois
- 2025, John Devaney, County Mayo
- 2026, Katie Kilkenny, County Mayo

== Duets (Ceol Beirte) ==
- 1952, Michael Brophy and Joseph Ryan, County Dublin
- 1953, Paddy O'Brien and Bridie Lafferty
- 1955, James Rooney & Sean McAloon, County Fermanagh
- 1956, Seán Ryan & P. J. Moloney, County Tipperary
- 1959, Peter O'Loughlin & Paddy Murphy, County Clare
- 1962, Joe Burke & Aggie Whyte, County Galway
- 1963, Charlie Lennon & Sean Murphy, Liverpool
- 1965, Gerry Forde & Tim Flood, County Wexford
- 1968, Gerry Forde & Tim Flood, County Wexford
- 1977, Sean McGlynn & Brendan Mulvihill, Washington D.C.
- 1975, Jimmy Keane & Liz Carroll, Chicago
- 1976, John and Eileen Brady, County Offaly
- 1977, Billy McComiskey & Brendan Mulvihill, New York
- 1979, Martin Hayes & Mary McNamara, County Clare
- 1982, Pat Flood & Pat Fitzpatrick, County Wexford
- 1983, Sean & Breda Smyth, County Mayo
- 1984, Rose Daly & Sean O Dalaigh Offaly & Dublin
- 1985, E. Minogue & M. Cooney, County Tipperary
- 1986, Rose Daly & Sean o Dalaigh Offaly & Dublin
- 1987, Joanie Madden & Kathy McGinty, New York
- 1988, Michael & Chris McDonagh, Luton, UK
- 1989, PJ Hernon & Philip Duffy, County Sligo
- 1990, Elizabeth Gaughan & Michael Tennyson, Leeds
- 1991, Micheal & MacDara O'Reily, Meath
- 1992, Micheal & MacDara O'Reily, Meath
- 1993, Paul McGlinchey & Barry McLaughlin, Tyrone
- 1994, Anthony Quigney & Aiden McMahon, Clare
- 1995, Mirella Murray & Liz Kane, County Galway
- 1996, Ursula & Clare Byrne, County Down
- 1997, Aisling & Alan O Choisdeabha, County Tipperary
- 1998, Antoin O Connaill & Diarmuid O Brien, County Limerick
- 1999, Cathal & C. Ní Chlochasaigh, County Limerick
- 2000, Loretto Ní Mhaoldomhnaigh & Thomas Slattery, County Tipperary
- 2001, Nuala Hehir & Liz Gaughan, County Clare
- 2002, Sharon Carroll & Attracta Brady, County Offaly
- 2003, Seana & Lorna Ní Dhaithí, County Meath
- 2004, Úna Devlin & Paul Quinn, County Armagh
- 2005, Mairéad McManus & Katie Boyle, Glasgow
- 2006, Aisling Neville & Alan Egan, County Kerry
- 2007, Tara Breen & Cathal Mac an Rí, County Clare
- 2008, Sean & Gearoid Ó Cathain, County Kildare
- 2009, Daragh & Micheál Ó hÉalaí, County Mayo
- 2010, Alan Finn & Rory McMahon, County Cork
- 2011, Lottie & Courtney Cullen, County Wicklow
- 2012, Seacailín & Eibhlín Ní Éalaithe, County Limerick
- 2013, Rory Healy & John Bass, County Wicklow
- 2014, Orlaith McAuliffe & Brogan McAuliffe, London, England
- 2015, Patricia McArdle & Róisín Anne Hughes, Glasgow, Scotland
- 2016, Anne Marie Bell & Megan Duffy, County Sligo
- 2017, Tadhg & Saran Mulligan, County Louth
- 2018, Áine & Ciarán Mac Gearailt (FitzGerald), County Kildare
- 2019, Jason & Damien McGuinness, County Sligo
- 2022, Ellen O'Gorman & Joseph Mannion, County Waterford
- 2023, Aine Murphy & Ciara Tighe, County Clare
- 2024, Aidan Quigney & Sarah Fox, County Clare
- 2025, Aaron & Ava Glancy, County Sligo
- 2026, Liam Mac Giobún & Ríona Ní Éilí, County Cork

== Trios (Ceol Trír) ==
- 1952, Paddy Brophy, Mick Brophy and Joe Ryan, County Dublin
- 1960, Larry Redican, Jack Coen, Paddy O'Brien
- 1967, Joe Burke, Kathleen Collins & Carl Hession, County Galway
- 1974, Eugene Nolan, Denis Ryan & Ellen Flanagan, County Kildare
- 1975, Eugene Nolan, Denis Ryan & Ellen Flanagan, County Kildare
- 1976, Collis Trio, County Sligo
- 1977, O’Brien, Fogarty & Harty Trio, County Tipperary
- 1979, M. Harty, E.O'Brien & W. Fogarty, County Tipperary
- 1980, S. Rattigan, L. Gaul, D. Robinson, County Wexford
- 1983, M. Nugent, J Nugent & M. Carroll, County Clare
- 1985, Cathrine, Anne & Fiona McEnroe, County Cavan
- 1987, J. Lawlor, J. & E. Kennedy, Luton, UK
- 1988, Mary O'Connell, Michael & Christopher McDonagh, Luton, UK
- 1989, Michael Hurley, P. J. Hernon & Philip Duffy, County Sligo,
- 1991, Thomas, John & Robert Morrow, County Leitrim
- 1992, Michael, MacDara, & Felim O'Reily, Meath
- 1994, Michael Tennyson, Liz Gaughan & Maureen Ferguson, Leeds
- 1995, Claire Griffin, Anthony Quigney & Aiden McMahon, County Clare
- 1996, Seán, Mairín & Caitríona O Clochasaigh, County Limerick
- 1997, Darragh Pattwell, Alan & Aisling Coisdealbha, County Tipperary
- 1998, John & Jacinta McEvoy, Patsy Moloney, Birmingham
- 1999, Tomás Keegan, Pat Bass & John Bass, County Wexford
- 2000, Cathal, Mairín & Cáit Clohessey, County Limerick
- 2001, Nuala Hehir, Liz Gaughan & Brendan Quinn, County Clare
- 2002, Carmel Doohan, Clive Earley, Ciara O'Sullivan, County Clare
- 2003, Fionnuala Ní Ruanaidh, Thomas Johnson, Laura Ní Bheagain, County Monaghan
- 2004, John Burke, Carmel Burke & Siobhán Ní Chonaráin, Birmingham
- 2005, Ciara Ní Chondúin, Aidan Hill & Michael Harrison, County Tipperary
- 2006, Danielle O’Riordan, John Neville & Katie Lucey, County Kerry
- 2007, Sean & Gearóid Keane & Cormac Murphy, County Kildare
- 2008, Alan Egan, Michael Mac Conraoí & Gearóidín Ní Cheallacháin, County Limerick
- 2009, Cian & Caoimhe Ní Chiaráin and Seán Farrell, County Sligo
- 2010, Máiréad & Aisling Ní Mhocháin & Seán Céitinn, County Cork
- 2012, Tanya Murphy, Darina Gleeson and Stephanie Carthy. County Wexford
- 2013, Alan Finn, Rory Mc Mahon & Eoin O' Sullivan, County Cork
- 2014, Eimear Coughlan, Francis Cunningham & Marian Curtin, An Tulach/Croisín/Laichtín Naofa
- 2015, Daithí Gormley, Cian & Caoimhe Kearins, County Sligo
- 2016, Áine Nic Gearailt (FitzGerald), Ciarán Mac Gearailt (FitzGerald) & Cormac Mac Aodhagán, County Kildare
- 2017, Tomás Quinn, Michael Kerr, Christopher Maguire, County Tyrone
- 2018, Aileen De Burca, Deirdre De Barra & Eibhlin De Barra, County Mayo
- 2019, Jack Boyle, Orlaith McAuliffe & Christopher Maguire, London
- 2022, Aoibhin Morgan, Lucia Morgan & Oisin Bradley, County Down
- 2025, Aodhán Hughes, Áine Fox & Cathal Walsh, County Mayo
- 2026, Ciarán Ó Shlatarra, Keelan Mac Craith & William Holmes, County Tipperary

== Céilí Band (Banna Céilí) ==
- 1951, Athlone 'B' Band, County Westmeath
- 1952, Williamstown Girls' Ceili Band, County Roscommon
- 1953, Aughrim Slopes Céilí Band, County Galway
- 1954, Kilfenora Céilí Band, County Clare, Athlone Céilí Band, County Westmeath, and Mayglass Céilí Band, County Wexford (tie)
- 1955, Kilfenora Céilí Band, County Clare
- 1956, Kilfenora Céilí Band, County Clare
- 1957, Tulla Céilí Band, County Clare
- 1958, Kincora Céilí Band, County Dublin
- 1959, Leitrim Céilí Band, County Galway
- 1960, Tulla Céilí Band, County Clare
- 1961, Kilfenora Céilí Band, County Clare
- 1962, Leitrim Céilí Band, County Galway
- 1963, Liverpool Céilí Band, Liverpool
- 1964, Liverpool Céilí Band, Liverpool
- 1965, Castle Céilí Band, County Dublin
- 1966, Glenside Céilí Band, London
- 1967, Siamsa Céilí Band, County Louth
- 1968, Siamsa Céilí Band, County Louth
- 1969, Siamsa Céilí Band, County Louth
- 1970, Bridge Céilí Band, County Laois
- 1971, Green Linnet Céilí Band, County Dublin
- 1972, Brosna Céilí Band, County Kerry;
- 1973, Bridge Céilí Band, County Laois
- 1974, Bridge Céilí Band, County Laois
- 1975, Pipers Club Céilí Band, County Dublin
- 1976, Pipers Club Céilí Band, County Dublin
- 1977, Longridge Céilí Band, County Offaly
- 1978, Longridge Céilí Band, County Offaly
- 1979, Ormond Céilí Band, County Tipperary
- 1980, Ormond Céilí Band, County Tipperary
- 1981, Ormond Céilí Band, County Tipperary
- 1982, Longridge Céilí Band, County Offaly
- 1983, Pride of Erin Céilí Band, County Fermanagh
- 1984, Ormond Céilí Band, County Tipperary
- 1985, Pride of Erin Céilí Band, County Fermanagh
- 1986, The Thatch Céilí Band, London, England
- 1987, The Thatch Céilí Band, London, England
- 1988, St. Colmcille's Céilí Band, St. Albans, Hertfordshire, England
- 1989, Siamsa Céilí Band, County Louth
- 1990, Siamsa Céilí Band, County Louth
- 1991, St. Colmcille's Céilí Band, St. Albans
- 1992, Bridge Céilí Band, County Laois
- 1993, Kilfenora Céilí Band, County Clare
- 1994, Kilfenora Céilí Band, County Clare
- 1995, Kilfenora Céilí Band, County Clare
- 1996, Bridge Céilí Band, County Laois
- 1997, Bridge Céilí Band, County Laois
- 1998, Táin Céilí Band, County Louth
- 1999, Táin Céilí Band, County Louth
- 2000, Táin Céilí Band, County Louth
- 2001, Ennis Céilí Band, County Clare
- 2002, Ennis Céilí Band, County Clare
- 2003, Ennis Céilí Band, County Clare
- 2004, Naomh Pádraig Céilí Band, County Meath
- 2005, Naomh Pádraig Céilí Band, County Meath
- 2006, Naomh Pádraig Céilí Band, County Meath
- 2007, Allow Céilí Band, County Cork
- 2008, Innisfree Céilí Band, County Sligo
- 2009, Dartry Céilí Band, County Sligo
- 2010, Teampall An Ghleanntáin Céilí Band, County Limerick
- 2011, Shannonvale Céilí Band, County Kerry
- 2012, Awbeg Céilí Band, County Cork
- 2013, Moylurg Céilí band, County Roscommon
- 2014, Knockmore Ceili Band, County Fermanagh
- 2015, Shandrum Céilí Band, County Cork
- 2016, Shandrum Céilí Band, County Cork
- 2017, Shandrum Céilí Band, County Cork
- 2018, Blackwater Céilí Band, County Tyrone
- 2019, Cnoc na Gaoithe Céilí Band, County Clare
- 2022, Taobh na Mara Céilí Band, County Waterford
- 2023, Pipers Cross Céilí Band, Contae Maighe Eo
- 2024, Beartla Ó Flatharta Céilí Band, County Kildare
- 2025, Glór na dTonn Céilí Band, County Mayo
- 2026, The Lissadell Céilí Band, County Sligo

== Instrumental Groups (Grúpaí Ceoil) ==
- 1979, Armagh Pipers Club, County Armagh
- 1980, Ceoltóirí Mágh Ealla, Mallow, County Cork
- 1981, Ceoltóirí Mágh Ealla, Mallow, County Cork
- 1982, Ceoltóirí Mágh Ealla, Mallow, County Cork
- 1983, Ryan Family Group, County Tipperary
- 1984, Shamrock, Paris, France
- 1985, St. Alban's Group, Herts., UK
- 1986, St. James Gate, San Antonio, Texas
- 1987, Ballishall, County Wicklow
- 1989, Loughmore Senior Grúpa Ceoil
- 1990, Corrib Traditional Group, County Galway
- 1991, Ma Rua/Ceapach Mór, County Limerick
- 1992, Teampall an Ghleanntáin, County Limerick
- 1993, Urlan Grúpa Cheoil, County Clare
- 1994, Cois Locha, Portglenone, County Antrim
- 1995, Tara, Manchester
- 1996, St. Michael's, County Limerick
- 1997, Craobh Naithi CCE, County Dublin
- 1998, Grupa Cheoil Cholmain Naofa Clar Choinne Mhuiris, County Mayo
- 1999, Ballydonoghue / Lisselton CCÉ, County Kerry
- 2000, St. Michael's, County Limerick
- 2001, CCÉ, Teampall an Ghleanntáin, County Limerick
- 2002, Éamon Ó Muirí CCÉ, County Monaghan
- 2003, South Birmingham CCÉ, Birmingham
- 2004, St. Louis Irish Arts Grúpa Cheoil, St. Louis
- 2005, Ceoltóirí Craobh na Coradh, County Clare
- 2006, Ceoltóirí Mhuscraí, County Cork
- 2007, St. Rochs, Irish Minstrels Branch, Glasgow, Scotland
- 2008, CCÉ, Teampall an Ghleanntáin, County Limerick
- 2009, CCÉ, Fred Finn, County Sligo
- 2010, CCÉ, Teampall An Ghleanntáin, County Limerick
- 2011, CCÉ, Edenderry, County Offaly
- 2012, Ceoltóirí Coillte, Illinois, USA
- 2013, CCÉ, Guaire Baile Ghearóid, County Wexford
- 2014, Ceoltóirí Cois Féile, County Kerry
- 2016, Ceoltóirí Knockfennell, CCÉ Caisleán Uí Chonaill/Atháin/Baile Iobaird, County Limerick
- 2017, St Roch's, Glasgow, Scotland
- 2018, Tairseach, CCÉ Cill Shléibhe/Tulach Sheasta, County Tipperary
- 2019, Ceoltóirí Tireragh, County Sligo
- 2022, Tigh na Coille, County Clare
- 2023, Lios Árd, Lackagh CCÉ, County Galway
- 2024, Lendrum, Fintona CCÉ, County Tyrone
- 2026, Tigh na Coulle, County Clare

== Accordion Bands (Buíon Cheoil Cáirdin) ==
- 1984, Mayobridge Youth Band, County Down
- 1985, St. Patrick's Accordion Band, County Down
- 1987, St. Patrick's Accordion Band, County Donegal
- 1988, St Oliver Plunkett Accordion Band, Strabane Co, Tyrone
- 1989, St Marys Accordion Band, Convoy, Co, Donegal
- 1990, St Oliver Plunkett Accordion Band, Strabane Co, Tyrone
- 1991, St. Patrick's Accordion Band, Drumkein, County Donegal
- 1992, St Oliver Plunkett Accordion Band, Keady Co, Armagh
- 1993, St Oliver Plunkett Accordion Band, Keady Co, Armagh
- 1994, St Oliver Plunkett Accordion Band, Strabane Co, Tyrone
- 1995, St Oliver Plunkett Accordion Band, Keady Co, Armagh
- 1996, Fanad Accordion Band, County Donegal
- 1997, Fanad Accordion Band, County Donegal
- 1998, St. Miguels Band, Downpatrick, County Down
- 1999, Mayobridge Youth Band, County Down
- 2000, Mayobridge Youth Band, County Down
- 2001, Mayobridge Youth Band, County Down
- 2002, K & S Accordion Band, County Meath
- 2003, Mayobridge Youth Band, County Down
- 2004, Saint Enda Accordion Band, County Monaghan
- 2005, St. Brigid's Accordion Band, Jonesboro, County Armagh
- 2006, Mayobridge Youth Band, County Down
- 2007, St. Brigid's Accordion Band, Jonesboro, County Armagh
- 2008, St. Brigid's Accordion Band, Jonesboro, County Armagh
- 2009, St. Brigid's Accordion Band, Jonesboro, County Armagh
- 2010, Holy Cross Accordion Band, Atticall, County Down
- 2011, Holy Cross Accordion Band, Atticall, County Down
- 2012, St. Brigid's Accordion Band, Jonesboro, County Armagh
- 2013, St. Brigid's Accordion Band, Jonesboro, County Armagh
- 2014, Holy Cross Accordion Band Atticall, County Down
- 2015, St. Brigid's Accordion Band, Jonesboro, County Armagh
- 2016, Holy Cross Accordion Band Atticall, County Down
- 2017, Holy Cross Accordion Band Atticall, County Down
- 2018, Holy Cross Accordion Band Atticall, County Down
- 2019, No Competitors
- 2022, No Competitors
- 2023, Kentstown and Senchelstown Marching Band, County Meath
- 2026, St Catherine's Band, County Donegal

== Flute Bands (Buíon Cheoil Feadóg Mhór) ==
- 1984, Harry Hickey Flute band, Atha Cliath
- 1985, Clooney Flute Band, County Antrim
- 1986, Clooney Flute Band, County Antrim
- 1987, Droma Mor Rann na Feirste, County Donegal
- 1988, Clooney Flute Bcand, County Antrim
- 1989, Clooney Flute Band, County Antrim
- 1990, Droma Mor Rann Na Feirste, Co Donegal
- 1991, Droma Mor Rann Na Feirste, Co Donegal
- 1992, Mullaghduff Fife & Drum Band, County Donegal
- 1993, Clooney Flute Band, County Antrim
- 1994, Mullaghduff Fife & Drum Band, County Donegal
- 1995, Mullaghduff Fife & Drum Band, County Donegal
- 1996, Mullaghduff Fife & Drum Band, County Donegal
- 1997, Maghery Fife & Drum Band, County Donegal
- 1998, Maghery Fife & Drum Band, County Donegal
- 1999, Mullaghduff Fife & Drum Band, County Donegal
- 2000, Droma Mor Rann na Feirste, County Donegal
- 2001, Maghery Fife & Drum Band, County Donegal
- 2002, Maghery Fife & Drum Band, County Donegal
- 2003, Buion Ceoil Cnoiceach Mór, Burtonport, County Donegal
- 2004, Buion Ceoil Cnoiceach Mór, Burtonport, County Donegal
- 2005, Buion Ceoil Cnoiceach Mór, Burtonport, County Donegal
- 2006, Mullaghduff Fife & Drum Band, County Donegal
- 2007, Mullaghduff Fife & Drum Band, County Donegal
- 2008, Mullaghduff Fife & Drum Band, County Donegal
- 2009, Mullaghduff Fife & Drum Band, County Donegal
- 2010, Mullaghduff Fife & Drum Band, County Donegal
- 2011, Mullaghduff Fife & Drum Band, County Donegal
- 2012, Mullaghduff Fife & Drum Band, County Donegal
- 2013, Mullaghduff Fife & Drum Band, County Donegal
- 2014, Mullaghduff Fife & Drum Band, County Donegal
- 2015, Maghery Fife & Drum Band, County Donegal
- 2016, Maghery Fife & Drum Band, County Donegal
- 2017, Maghery Fife & Drum Band, County Donegal
- 2018, Maghery Fife & Drum Band, County Donegal
- 2019, Maghery Fife & Drum Band, County Donegal
- 2022, Maghery Fife & Drum Band, County Donegal
- 2023, Maghery Fife & Drum Band, County Donegal
- 2024, Maghery Fife & Drum Band, County Donegal
- 2025, Maghery Fife & Drum Band, County Donegal
- 2026, Maghery Fife & Drum Band, County Donegal “10 in a Row”.

== Miscellaneous Marching Bands (Buíon Rogha Gléas) ==
- 1975, Acres National School Band, Burtonport, County Donegal
- 1976, Killeshill Youth Band, County Tyrone
- 1977, Claremorris Marching Band, County Mayo
- 1983, Convent of Mercy Marching Band, County Mayo
- 1984, St. Cecilia's Youth Band, Lisnaskea, County Fermanagh (Junior)
- 1985, St. Crona's Accordion Band, Dungloe, County Donegal
- 1985, St. Cecilia's Youth Band, Lisnaskea, County Fermanagh (Senior)
- 1986, Clochaneely Marching Band, County Donegal
- 1987, St. Macartan's Band, County Fermanagh
- 1989, Cloughaneely Marching Band, County Donegal
- 1979, St. Patricks Accordion Band, County Tyrone
- 1991, St. Crona's Accordion Band, Dungloe, County Donegal
- 1993, St. Cecilia's Band, Aughnamullen, County Monaghan
- 1994, St. Cecilia's Band, Aughnamullen, County Monaghan
- 1995, St. Cecilia's Band, Aughnamullen, County Monaghan
- 1996, St. Columba's Band, County Donegal
- 1999, St. Mary's Band Broomfield, County Monaghan
- 2000, St. Mary's Band Broomfield, County Monaghan
- 2001, St. Mary's Band Broomfield, County Monaghan
- 2002, Buíon Cheoil Chloich Cheann Fhaola, County Donegal
- 2003, St. Mary's Band Broomfield, County Monaghan
- 2004, St. Crona's Band, Dungloe, County Donegal
- 2005, St. Mary's Band Broomfield, County Monaghan
- 2006, Donaghmoyne Band, County Monaghan
- 2007, St. Mary's, Castleblayney Band, County Monaghan
- 2008, St. Mary's, Castleblayney Band, County Monaghan
- 2009, Banna Ceoil, Ramelton, County Donegal
- 2010, Ramelton, Ráth Mealton, County Donegal
- 2011, Buncrana, County Donegal
- 2012, Ramelton Town Snr Miscellaneous Band, County Donegal
- 2013, Ramelton Town Snr Miscellaneous Band, County Donegal
- 2014, Ramelton Town Snr Miscellaneous Band, County Donegal
- 2017, Buion Cheoil Sinsear Chloich Cheann Fhaola, County Donegal
- 2018, Buion Cheoil Sinsear Chloich Cheann Fhaola, County Donegal
- 2019, Ramelton Town Snr Miscellaneous Band, County Donegal
- 2022, Mullingar Town Band, County Westmeath
- 2023, Buion Cheoil Sinsear Chloich Cheann Fhaola, County Donegal
- 2024, St Roch’s, Irish Minstrels, Scotland

== Pipe Bands (Buíon Cheoil Phíob) ==
Note that the All-Ireland Fleadh Championships are unrelated to the All-Ireland Pipe Band Championships organised jointly by the Irish Pipe Band Association (IPBA) and the Northern Ireland Branch of the Royal Scottish Pipe Band Association (RSPBANI).

- 1985, O'Neill Pipe Band, County Armagh
- 1987, O'Neill Pipe Band, County Armagh
- 1991, Annsborough Pipe Band, County Down
- 1992, Clonoe Independent Pipe Band, Co Tyrone
- 1993, Clonoe Independent Pipe Band, Co Tyrone
- 1994, Clonoe Independent Pipe Band, Co Tyrone
- 1996, Aghagallon Pipe Band, County Armagh
- 2001, Buíon Cheoil Phíb Mhór Cloghfin, County Tyrone
- 2002, Aughnamullen Pipe Band, County Monaghan
- 2003, Achill Schools, County Mayo
- 2004, St. Joseph's Pipe Band, County Down
- 2005, St. Joseph's Pipe Band, County Down
- 2006, Edendork Pipe Band, County Tyron
- 2007, Edendork Pipe Band, County Tyrone
- 2008, Edendork Pipe Band, County Tyrone
- 2010, Buíon Cheoil Phíb Mhór Cloghfin, County Tyrone
- 2011, St Josephs Pipe Band, Longstone, County Down
- 2012, Crimlin Batafada Pipe Band, County Mayo
- 2013, Corduff Pipe Band, County Monaghan
- 2014, Corduff Pipe Band, County Monaghan
- 2016, Achill Pipe Band, County Mayo
- 2017, Achill Pipe Band, County Mayo
- 2018, St Josephs Pipe Band, Longstone, County Down
- 2022, No Competitors
- 2023, Clonoe Independent Pipe Band, County Tyrone

== Irish Singing - Ladies (Amhrán Gaeilge - Mná) ==
- 1957, Rós Máire Ní Giollarnath, County Galway
- 1971, Nora O Loughlin, Rathdrum, Co. Wicklow
- 1973, Nora O Loughlin, Rathdrum, Co. Wicklow
- 1975, Lena Bn. Uí Shé, County Xxxxx
- 1976, Nora McDonagh, Chicago
- 1977, Mary Cooley, Chicago
- 1979, Eibhlín Briscoe, County Tipperary
- 1983, Máiréad Ní Oistín, County Dublin
- 1985, Karen Breathnach, County Kerry
- 1987, Nóra Ní Dhonnacha, County Galway
- 1996, Mary Gallagher, County Cork
- 1998 Mairéad Ní Fhlatharta, County Galway
- 1999, Caitríona Ní Laoire, County Meath
- 2000, Karen Ní Thrinsigh, County Kerry
- 2001, Karen Ní Thrinsigh, County Kerry
- 2002, Treasa Bn. Uí Chonaill, County Galway
- 2003, Astrid Ní Mhongáin, County Mayo
- 2004, Bairbre Uí Theighneáin, Clonaslee, County Laois
- 2005, Máire Ní Choilm, County Donegal
- 2006, Nollaig Nic Andriú, County Mayo
- 2007, Rachel Ní Ghairbheith, County Roscommon
- 2008, Nollaig Ní Laiore, County Meath
- 2009, Gobnait Ní Chrualaoi, County Cork
- 2010, Róisín Ní Riain, County Kerry
- 2011, Gobnait Ní Chrualaoí, County Cork
- 2012, Muireann Ní Luasa, County Cork
- 2013, Clár Nic Ruairi, City of Derry
- 2014, Sailí Ní Dhroighneáin, County Galway
- 2015, Paula Ní Chualáin, County Galway
- 2016, Eimear Arkins, Missouri, USA
- 2017, Gráinne Ní Fhatharta, County Galway
- 2018, Danielle Ní Chéilleachair, County Cork
- 2019, Kathryn Ní Mhaolán, City of Derry
- 2022, Clíona Ní Ghallachóir, County Donegal
- 2025, Ellen de Búrca, County Cork
- 2026, Caitríona Ní Thiarnáin, County Mayo

== Irish Singing - Men (Amhrán Gaeilge - Fir) ==
- 1956, Sean Quinn, County Clare
- 1975, T. O’Duinnon, County Xxxxx
- 1976, Clement Mac Suibhne, County Donegal
- 1977, Seosamh Mac Donnacha, County Galway
- 1979, Maithiún Ó Caoimh, County Tipperary
- 1982, Martin Joyce, Leeds
- 1983, Seán Ó Cróinín, County Cork
- 1984, John Flanagan, County Galway
- 1985, Martin Joyce, Leeds
- 1986, Seán Mac Craith, County Waterford
- 1987, Dara Bán Mac Dhonnacha, County Galway
- 1988, Risteard Ó hEidhín
- 1989, Philip Enright, County Limerick
- 1991, Patrick Connolly
- 1992, Diarmuid Ó Cathasaigh, County Cork
- 1993, Patrick Connolly
- 1994, Padraic McNulty, County Mayo
- 1995, Naoise Ó Mongáin, County Mayo
- 1996, Bartlae Breathnach, County Galway
- 1997, Traolach Ó Conghaile, County Mayo
- 1998, Traolach Ó Conghaile, County Mayo
- 1999, Naoise Ó Mongáin, County Mayo
- 2000, Traolach Ó Conghaile, County Mayo
- 2001, Ciarán Ó Coincheanainn, County Galway
- 2002, Eoghan Warner, County Kerry
- 2003, Naoise Ó Mongáin, County Mayo
- 2004, Tadhg Ó Meachair, County Tipperary
- 2005, Coireall Mac Curtain, County Limerick
- 2006, Colm McDonagh, County Galway
- 2007, Liam Ó Cróinín, County Cork
- 2008, Breandán Ó Ceannabháin, County Galway
- 2009, Breandán Ó Ceannabháin, County Galway
- 2010, Seosamh Ó Críodáin, County Kerry
- 2011, Seosamh Ó Críodáin, County Kerry
- 2012, Seosamh Ó Críodáin, County Kerry
- 2013, Anraí Ó Domhnaill, County Donegal
- 2014, Anraí Ó Domhnaill, County Donegal
- 2015, Conchubhar Ó Luasa, County Cork
- 2016, Anraí Ó Domhnaill, County Donegal
- 2017, Ciarán Ó Donnabháin, County Cork
- 2018, Lughaidh Mac an Iascaire, County Dublin
- 2019, Proinnsias O Cathasaigh, County Kerry
- 2022, Piaras Ó Lorcáin, County Armagh
- 2024, Féidhlim Mac Donncha, County Kildare
- 2025, Féidhlim Mac Donncha, County Kildare
- 2026, Féidhlim Mac Donncha, County Kildare

== English Singing - Ladies (Amhrán Béarla - Mná) ==
- 19??, Rita Gallagher, County Donegal; (three times winner - years unknown)
- 1969, Nora Butler, County Tipperary
- 1970, Nora Butler, County Tipperary
- 1971, Nora Butler, County Tipperary
- 1972, Anne Brolly, City of Derry
- 1974, Mary Brogan, County Wexford
- 1975, M. O’Reilly, County Xxxxx
- 1976, Pauline Sweeney, County Donegal
- 1977, Pauline Sweeney, County Donegal
- 1978, Pauline Sweeney, County Donegal
- 1979, Rita Gallager, County Donegal
- 1983, Siobhan O'Donnell, London, England
- 1985, Rose Daly, County Offaly
- 1986, Rose Daly, County Offaly
- 1987, Rose Daly, County Offaly
- 1991, Karen Walsh, County Kerry
- 1995, Catherine Mc Laughlin (née Nugent), County Fermanagh
- 1996, Christina Pierce, County Roscommon
- 1997, Fionnuala O' Reilly, County Leitrim
- 1999, Máire Ní Chéilleachair, County Cork
- 2000, Astrid Ní Mhongáin, County Mayo
- 2001, Deirdre Scanlon, County Limerick
- 2002, Sharon Buckley, County Kerry
- 2003, Ann Marie Kavanagh, County Tipperary
- 2004, Christina Pierce, County Roscommon
- 2005, Brigid Delaney, County Kildare
- 2006, Brigid Delaney, County Kildare
- 2007, Kate Ford, County Donegal
- 2008, Amelia Ní Mhurchú, County Monaghan
- 2009, Shauna McGarrigle, County Offaly
- 2010, Denise Whelan, County Clare
- 2011, Eibhlín Máire Ní Dhuibhir, County Limerick
- 2012, Eibhlín Ní Bhrúdair, County Limerick
- 2013, Eimear Arkins, County Clare
- 2014, Cáit Ní Bhrúdair Uí Mhurchú, County Limerick
- 2015, Kathryn Nea, County Westmeath
- 2019, Julie-Ann McCaffrey, County Fermanagh
- 2022, Cáit Ní Bhaoghill, County Monaghan
- 2025, Cáit Ní Shúilleabháin, County Cork
- 2026, Eimear Magee, County Down

== English Singing - Men (Amhrán Béarla - Fir) ==
- 1970, Paddy Berry, County Wexford
- 1971, Len Graham, County Louth
- 1972, Oliver Mulligan, County Monaghan
- 1973, Frank Harte, County Dublin
- 1975, Peter Nolan, County Offaly
- 1976, Paddy Berry, County Wexford
- 1977, Vincent Crowley, Bantry, County Cork
- 1979, John Cronin, Drinagh, County Cork
- 1983, Vincent Crowley, Bantry, County Cork
- 1985, John Furlong, County Wexford
- 1986, Seán Ó Dálaigh Contae Átha Cliath
- 1987, Gerard McQuaid, County Monaghan
- 1989, Phil Berry, County Wexford
- 1996, John Power, County Waterford
- 1997, John Power, County Waterford
- 1998, Maurice Foley, County Cork
- 1999, John Furlong, County Wexford
- 2000, Séamus Brogan, St. Albans, England
- 2001, Jon Jon Williams, County Londonderry
- 2002, Brian Hart, St. Louis, USA
- 2003, Cathal Lynch, County Tyrone
- 2004, Donal Bowe, County Tipperary
- 2005, Dónal Ó Liatháin, County Limerick
- 2006, Seán Breen, County Kerry
- 2007, Niall Wall (Niall de Bhál), County Wexford
- 2008, Padraic Keena (Padhraic Ó Cionnaith), County Westmeath
- 2009, Tadhg Maher (Tadhg Ó Meachair), County Tipperary
- 2010, Cian Ó Ciaráin, County Sligo
- 2011, Cathal O'Neill, County Tyrone
- 2012, Peadar Sherry, County Monaghan
- 2013, Daoirí Farrell, County Dublin
- 2014, Micheál O'Shea, County Kerry
- 2019, Kevin Elam, Washington DC, USA
- 2022, Vincent Crowley, County Cork
- 2025, Colm Kirke, County Monaghan
- 2026, Piaras Ó Lorcáin, County Armagh

== Whistling (Feadaíl) ==
- 1956, Sean White, County Wexford
- 1958, Sean White, County Wexford
- 1959, John Brady, County Offaly
- 1961, Liam White, County Wexford
- 1966, Tom McHale, County Roscommon
- 1967, Leo Carthy, County Wexford
- 1968, Leo Carthy, County Wexford
- 1969, Leo Carthy, County Wexford
- 1970, Leo Carthy, County Wexford
- 1974, Joe Harris, County Kildare
- 1975, Paddy Berry, County Wexford
- 1976, Seamus O'Donnell, County Sligo
- 1977, Paddy Berry, County Wexford
- 1979, Michael Creavers, County Galway
- 1980, Liam Gaul, County Wexford
- 1983, Walter O'Hara, County Wexford
- 1985, Paddy O'Donnell, County Galway
- 1986, M.J. O'Reilly, County Wexford
- 1987, Padraig Ó Raithbheartaigh, County Galway
- 1988, Paddy Berry, County Wexford
- 1991, Alan O'Dwyer, County Wexford
- 1996, Michael Ryan, County Tipperary
- 1990, John O'Connell, County Antrim
- 1998, Síle Áine de Barra, County Cork
- 1999, Sean White, County Wexford
- 2000, Frances Donahue, County Galway
- 2001, Séan Seosamh Mac Domhnaill, County Mayo
- 2002, Séan Seosamh Mac Domhnaill, County Mayo
- 2003, Ainíde Uí Bhennéis, County Limerick (CCÉ Teampall a' Gleanntain)
- 2004, Ainíde Uí Bhennéis, County Limerick (CCÉ Teampall a' Gleanntain)
- 2005, Ainíde Uí Bhennéis, County Limerick (CCÉ Teampall a' Gleanntain)
- 2006, Ainíde Uí Bhennéis, County Limerick (CCÉ Teampall a' Gleanntain)
- 2007, Máiréad Ní Chorradáin, County Kerry (CCÉ Teampall a' Gleanntain)
- 2008, Tony Connolly, County Galway
- 2009, Claire McNicholl, City of Derry
- 2010, Ailéin Ó Dubhuir, County Wexford
- 2011, Ailéin Ó Dubhuir, County Wexford
- 2012, Ailéin Ó Dubhuir, County Wexford
- 2013, Ailéin Ó Dubhuir, County Wexford
- 2014, Séamus Ó hAirtnéide, County Limerick
- 2018, Ainíde Uí Bhennéis, County Limerick (CCE Teampall a' Ghleanntáin)
- 2019, Liam Jones, County Clare
- 2022, Liam Jones, County Clare
- 2023, Liam Jones, County Clare
- 2026, Phil Westwell, Scotland

== Lilting (Portaireacht) ==
- 1954, Paddy Tunney, County Fermanagh (inaugural year for lilting)
- 1955, Paddy Tunney, County Fermanagh
- 1956, Paddy Tunney, County Fermanagh
- 1959, Seamus Fay, County Cavan
- 1960, Seamus Fay, County Cavan
- 1961, Seamus Fay, County Cavan
- 1963, Micheal O'Rourke, County Leitrim
- 1964, Micky McCann, County Tyrone
- 1967, Josie McDermott, County Sligo
- 1968, Leo Carthy, County Wexford
- 1969, Seamus Fay, County Cavan
- 1972, Leo Carthy, County Wexford
- 1975, Joseph Harris, County Kildare
- 1976, Joseph Harris, County Kildare
- 1977, Vincent Crowley, County Cork
- 1978, Michael Rafferty, County Galway
- 1979, M.J. O'Reilly, County Wexford
- 1980, M.J. O'Reilly, County Wexford
- 1981, Oliver Kearney, County Kildare
- 1982, M.J. O'Reilly, County Wexford
- 1983, Michael Craven, County Galway
- 1985, M.J. O'Reilly, County Wexford
- 199x, John Culhane, County Limerick
- 199x, John Culhane, County Limerick
- 199x, John Culhane, County Limerick
- 199x, John Culhane, County Limerick
- 199x, John Culhane, County Limerick
- 1987, Padraig Ó Raithbheartaigh, County Galway
- 1996, Caitrona Cullivan, County Cavan
- 1999, Bernadette Collins, County Cork
- 2000, Seán Ó Cathaláin, County Limerick
- 2001, Seán Ó Cathaláin, County Limerick
- 2002, Seán Ó Cathaláin, County Limerick
- 2003, Tadhg Maher, County Tipperary
- 2004, Tommy Stone, County Offaly
- 2005, Seán Breen, County Kerry
- 2006, Séan Ó Cathaláin, County Limerick
- 2007, Seán Breen, County Kerry
- 2008, Cian Kearns (Cian Ó Ciaráin), County Sligo
- 2009, Seán Breen, County Kerry
- 2010, Paul O'Reilly (Pól Ó Raghallaigh), County Wexford
- 2011, Caoimhe Ní Chiaráin,(Caoimhe Kearins) County Sligo
- 2012, Eibhlín Ní Bhrúdair, County Limerick
- 2013, Aoife Colféir, County Wexford
- 2014, Donal Tydings, County Kerry
- 2019, Donagh McElligott, County Kerry
- 2022, Liam Jones, County Clare
- 2023, Liam Jones, County Clare
- 2026, Aoife Colfer, County Wexford

== Irish Singing - Newly Composed Songs (Amhrán Nuacheaptha Gaeilge) ==
- 1975, M. McGinley, County Donegal
- 1976, M. McGinley, County Donegal
- 1977, Máire Ní Bhaoil, County Monaghan
- 1979, M.J. O' Reilly, County Wexford
- 1982, M.J. O' Reilly, County Wexford
- 1983, Seán Ó Cathasaigh, County Cork
- 1985, Colm Mac Confhaola, County Wexford
- 1987, Jack McCutcheon, County Wexford
- 1996, Frances Donahue, County Galway
- 1999, Ciarán Ó Concheanainn, County Galway
- 2000, Matthew Gormally, County Galway
- 2001, Brenda O'Sullivan, County Dublin
- 2002, Brenda O'Sullivan, County Dublin
- 2003, Sarah Stone, County Offaly
- 2004, Dick Beamish, County Cork
- 2005, Seán Ó Muimhneacháin, County Cork
- 2006, Seán Ó Muimhneacháin, County Cork
- 2007, Seán Ó Muimhneacháin, County Cork
- 2008, Seán Ó Muimhneacháin, County Cork
- 2009, Seán Ó Muimhneacháin, County Cork
- 2010, Eilís Ní Shúilleabháin, County Cork
- 2011, Seán Ó Múimhneacháin, County Cork
- 2012, Diarmaid Ó hEachthigheirn, County Cork
- 2013, Liam Ó Riain, County Waterford
- 2014, Seán Ó Muimhneacháin, County Cork
- 2016, Nodlaig Ní Bhrollaigh, County Londonderry
- 2019, Seán Ó Muimhneacháin, County Cork
- 2022, Seán Ó Muimhneacháin, County Cork
- 2023, Féilim Mac Donncha, County Kildare
- 2024, Seán Ó Muimhneacháin, County Cork
- 2025, Bill Breathnach, County Wexford
- 2026, Féidhlim Mac Donncha, County Kildare

== English Singing - Newly Composed Songs (Amhrán Nuacheaptha, Bearla) ==
- 1975, John Cronin, Drinagh, County Cork
- 1976, Barbara Juppe, New York
- 1977, John Flanagan, County Clare
- 1979, Joseph Mulhern, City of Derry
- 1983, Tony Waldron, County Galway
- 1984, Seán Ó Dálaigh, Bóthar na gCloch, Áth Cliath
- 1985, Paddy Blake, County Wicklow
- 1986, Seán Ó Dalaigh, Bóthar na gCloch, Áth Cliath
- 1987, Pádraig Ó Raithbheartaigh, County Galway
- 1996, Dan Keane, County Kerry
- 1996, Dan Keane, County Kerry
- 1999, Dan Keane, County Kerry
- 2000, Colm O'Donnell, County Sligo
- 2001, Dan Keane, County Kerry
- 2002, Niall Wall, County Wexford
- 2003, Pete McAleer, Newport, Wales
- 2004, Bruce Scott, Liverpool
- 2005, Séan Ó Muimhneacháin, County Cork
- 2006, Bruce Scott, Liverpool
- 2007, Mary Ryan, County Kildare
- 2008, Étaoin Rowe, West London
- 2009, Terry Cowan, County Down
- 2010, Muiris Mac Giolla Choda, County Cork
- 2011, Muiris Mac Giolla Choda, County Cork
- 2012, Padhraig Ó Tuathail, County Mayo
- 2013, Shauna McGarrigle, County Offaly
- 2014, Etaoin Rowe, London, England
- 2015, Julie-Ann McCaffrey, County Fermanagh
- 2019, Joe Kelly, County Westmeath
- 2022, Terry Cowan, County Down
- 2025, Rísteard de Stóc, County Westmeath
- 2026, Muiris Mac Giolla Choda, County Cork

== Newly Composed Tunes (Píosaí Ceoil Nuaceaptha) ==
- 2011, Marie Walsh, County Galway
- 2012, Nóirín Ní Shúilleabháin, County Galway
- 2013, Keelan Mac Craith, County Tipperary
- 2014, Donagh McElligott, County Kerry
- 2015, Blaithín Kennedy, County Tipperary
- 2016, Jody Moran, Victoria, Australia
- 2017, Jody Moran, Victoria, Australia
- 2018, Joanne O'Connor, County Limerick
- 2019, Meibh Ní Dhubhlaioch, County Offaly
- 2022, Laoise Ní Chinnéide, County Tipperary
- 2023, Aoibhínn Lynch, County Longford
- 2024, Donnacha OʻGrady, Melbourne, Australia
- 2025, Conal Ó Maoilearca, County Kildare
- 2026, Rio Navarro, California, USA

== 8-Hand Céilí Dancing, Ladies (Rince Céilí Ochtair, Mná) ==
- 2011, Sliabh Luachra CCÉ, County Kerry
- 2012, Sliabh Luachra CCÉ, County Kerry
- 2013, Sliabh Luachra CCÉ, County Kerry
- 2014, Caisleán Nua, County Tipperary
- 2022, Fioreann Sarah, County Offaly
- 2026, CCÉ Cill Áirne-Spa Team Kate, County Kerry

== 8-Hand Céilí Dancing, Mixed (Rince Céilí Ochtair, Measctha) ==
- 2011, Foireann Rince Mhuineacháin, Emyvale, County Monaghan
- 2012, Emyvale CCÉ, County Monaghan
- 2013, Craobh Bheartla Uí Fhlatharta, CCÉ, County Kildare
- 2014, Emyvale CCÉ, County Monaghan
- 2022, CCÉ, Ardacha/Carraigchiarraí, County Limerick
- 2026, Omagh, County Tyrone

== 4-Hand Céilí Dancing, Ladies (Rince Céilí Ceathrair, Mná) ==
- 2011, Sliabh Luachra CCÉ, County Kerry
- 2012, Gleann Fleisce CCÉ, County Kerry
- 2013, Gleann Fleisce A, CCÉ, County Kerry
- 2014, Gleann Fleisce A, County Kerry
- 2022, Mullingar CCÉ, County Westmeath
- 2026, CCÉ Barr na Sráide - Team Saoirse, County Kerry

== 4-Hand Céilí Dancing, Mixed (Rince Céilí Ceathrair, Measctha) ==
- 2011, Foireann Rince Mhuineacháin, Emyvale, County Monaghan
- 2012, CCÉ, Teampall an Ghleanntáin, County Limerick
- 2013, Naomh Chiaráin, CCÉ, County Kerry
- 2014, Ballyduff/Ballinvella/Ballysaggart, County Waterford
- 2022, CCÉ, Ardacha/Carraigchiarraí, County Limerick
- 2026, CCÉ Maigh Nuad, County Kildare

== Set Dancing - Full Set, Ladies (Rince Seit, Mná) ==
- 1987, Gael Colmcille, County Meath
- 1988, Stoneybatter Set, Dublin
- 1989, Stoneybatter Set, Dublin
- 1990, Stoneybatter Set, Dublin
- 1996, Carrickcruppen Set
- 1998, Elphin County Roscommon
- 1999, Kilcummin Set, County Kerry
- 2000, Galbally/Ballyhogue, County Wexford
- 2001, Kilcummin, County Kerry
- 2002, Elphin Set, County Roscommon
- 2003, Gleneagle, County Kerry
- 2004, Gleneagle, County Kerry
- 2005, Glenflesk, County Kerry
- 2006, Abbeyknockmoy, County Galway
- 2007, Glenflesk (Gleann Fleisce), County Kerry
- 2008, Abbeyknockmoy, County Galway
- 2009, St. Ciara's, County Clare
- 2010, Cill Áirne, County Kerry
- 2011, Abbeyknockmoy, County Galway
- 2012, Caisleán Nua, County Tipperary
- 2013, Spa - Cill Áirne, County Kerry
- 2014, Spa - Cill Áirne, County Kerry
- 2018, Rithim an Chláir, CCÉ, Laichtín Naofa, County Clare
- 2022, CCÉ, Cill Áirne, County Kerry
- 2026,CCÉ, Cill Áirne - Spa: Team Tríona, County Kerry

== Set Dancing - Full Set, Mixed (Rince Seit, Measctha) ==
- 1990, The Banner Set, County Clare
- 1995, Elphin Set, County Roscommon
- 1996, Elphin set, County Roscommon
- 1997, Elphin Set, County Roscommon
- 1998, Tulla Set, County Clare
- 1999, Elphin Set, County Roscommon
- 2000, Abbeyknockmoy, County Galway
- 2001, Gleneagle, County Kerry
- 2002, Abbeyknockmoy, County Galway
- 2003, Gleneagle, County Kerry
- 2004, Gleneagle, County Kerry
- 2005, Knockcroghery, County Roscommon
- 2006, Glenflesk (Gleann Fleisce), County Kerry
- 2007, Glenflesk (Gleann Fleisce), County Kerry
- 2008, Kincora, County Clare
- 2009, Diabhlaíocht na hÓige, County Clare
- 2010, Rhythm of the Banner, County Clare
- 2011, Drithle an Iarthair, County Clare
- 2012, Kilcummin, County Kerry
- 2013, Céimeanna - Cill Áirne, County Kerry
- 2014, Ceimeanna - Cill Airne, County Kerry
- 2015, Ceimeanna - Cill Airne, County Kerry
- 2016, Rithim an Clair, County Clare
- 2017, Ceimeanna - Cill Airne, County Kerry
- 2018, Kilcummin, County Kerry
- 2022, Craobh an Choisdellibhe/Róisín Bn Uí Cheallaigh, County Mayo
- 2026, CCÉ, Inis Cathaigh - St. John's HFL, County Clare

== Set Dancing - Half Set, Mixed (Rince Leathsheit, Measctha) ==
- 2007, Glenflesk (Gleann Fleisce), County Kerry
- 2008, Cuilmore, County Mayo
- 2009, CCÉ, Cill Chuimín, County Kerry
- 2010, Ballyroan, County Laois
- 2011, Ballyduff/Ballinvella/Ballysaggart, CCÉ, County Waterford
- 2012, Kilcummin, County Kerry
- 2013, Ballyroan, County Laois
- 2014, Átha 'n Caoire, County Cork
- 2022, CCÉ, Kilcummin, County Kerry
- 2026, CCÉ, Team James, Cr An Choisdellibhe Roisin bn Uí Cheallaigh, County Mayo

== Full Set, Mixed, Over 35 (Rince Seit Measctha, Os cionn 35) ==
- 2011, Ruagairí an Chláir, County Clare
- 2012, Ballyduff/Ballinvella/Ballysaggart, County Waterford
- 2013, Spa - Cill Áirne, County Kerry
- 2014, Kilcummin CCÉ, County Kerry
- 2022, Bunbrosna, County Westmeath
- 2026, CCÉ, Corofin Set Dancers, County Galway

== Old Style Dancing (Rince ar an Sean Nós) ==
- 2011, Una Ní Fhlatharta, County Kildare
- 2012, Sharleen McCaffrey, County Westmeath
- 2013, Siobhán Ní Ghionntaigh, County Mayo
- 2014, John Joyce, County Galway
- 2015, John Joyce, County Galway
- 2016, John Joyce, County Galway
- 2022, Eoin Killeen, County Clare
- 2024, Seán Browne, County Clare
- 2026, Aoibh Dully, County Westmeath

== See also ==
- Traditional Irish Singers
- Comhaltas Ceoltóirí Éireann
- Irish Traditional Music
