= Seán Ryan (fiddler) =

Irish master fiddler and whistler

Seán Ryan (1919–1985) was a famous Irish master fiddler and whistler.

Ryan was born at Nenagh, County Tipperary, Ireland. He won the Oireachtas in 1954, the Senior All Ireland Fiddle Championship in 1955 and 1956, and the All Ireland Duet Championship title with P.J. Moloney in 1956. Ryan had 3 sisters and 6 brothers. His 3 sisters and 5 of his brothers have also died. Ryan came up from Nenagh to Garryhinch, Portarlington where he stayed with his grandmother, and it was while he was living with his grandmother that he met his first wife Anna Dunne. The couple got married in November 1945 and settled in Cloneyhurke. They had 7 children and 5 out of the 7 live around the Cloneyhurke area to date. Ryan composed some music in Cloneyhurke. Ryan's home in Cloneyhurke became a talking point with the locals as many famous musicians; e.g. Barney Mc Kenna, Joe Burke came to their home to play music with Ryan. Ryan's wife Anna died in March 1957. Ryan married his second wife Kathleen in 1966, and they settled in Rosenallis, and they had 3 children. He composed most of his tunes here. He is buried in Rosenallis.

== Discography (incomplete) ==
- Traditional Music of Ireland vol.1. Avoca Record Co. 33 AV 121, 1960. With P.J.Moloney.
- Traditional Music of Ireland vol.2. Avoca Record Co. 33 AV 134. With Peter Carberry.
- "Port Gael-Linn" - Track 13 on Milestone At The Garden: Irish Fiddle Masters From The 78 RPM Era
- Back Home to the Cliffs of Moher. As "Seán Ryan, Kathleen Ryan and Pat Lyons" aka "Seán Ryan Trio". Outlet Records SOLP 1012, 1972. Reissued on CD as Outlet PTICD 1012. Contents: St. Andrews; The swallow—Reavy's; The brook—Sliabh bloom; Frost is all over—Charlie Mulvhill's; McCollam's -- Tommy Coen's reels—The eel in the sink; Larry Redigan's -- Providence; Trip to Nenagh—Anne Sheehy's; The stage—Pipe on the hob; Coleman's -- Kiss me Kate; Sean Ryan's -- Thornton's; Tommy Maguire's -- Fahy's jigs. Track listing at irishtune.info
- A Collection of His Own Compositions and His Versions of Well Known Traditional Tunes. No publication information was included in the CD materials. Track listing at irishtune.info
