= Catherine McEvoy =

Irish musician

Catherine McEvoy is an Irish musician who plays the Irish traditional flute. She received the TG4 Musician of the Year award in 2019. Her playing is influenced by Josie McDermott.
