= Paddy Murphy (musician) =

Irish musician

- Born: 1913
- Died: 1992 (aged 78–79)
- Occupation: Musician

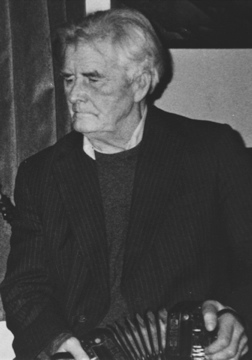
Paddy Murphy-Irish Concertina player

Paddy Murphy (1913-1992) is regarded as a founding father of modern Irish concertina music.

== Early life ==
Paddy Murphy was born in the rural community of Fiach Roe in the musically rich heartland of west County Clare (Ireland). His music developed during a time of unprecedented change in Irish society. Emigration from the Irish countryside was reaching critical mass, but Murphy chose to remain at home on a mountainy farm. During the next fifty years, he would become one of the most celebrated concertina players in Ireland, responsible for developing a unique fingering system and for passing on his skills to a new and eager generation of teachers and performers. He was greatly influenced by the recordings of William J. Mullaly, the first Irish concertina player to record commercially during the Golden Age of Irish music in America in the 1920s.

== Contributions ==
One of the first Clare musicians to broadcast on Radio Éireann, Murphy was also a competitive concertina player. His victory at the 1954 All Ireland Fleadh Cheoil na hÉireann in Cavan marked the first appearance of the concertina in a national music competition. Uilleann piper Willie Clancy lauded him as Ireland's 'finest concertina player'. Paddy Murphy is best remembered for pioneering a unique system of cross-row fingering. This original approach facilitated the use of alternative scales for traditional dance tunes in keys that were largely unfamiliar to most of his peers in the 1940s and 1950s. He was also a gifted teacher and his students included Gearóid Ó hAllmhuráin, Noel Hill, Gerald Haugh and Miriam Collins.

== Discography ==
- Paddy Murphy: In Good Hands: Field recordings from a Pioneer of the Irish Concertina (2007)
