= Josie McDermott =

Traditional Irish musician

Josie McDermott (1925–1992) was a traditional Irish musician: a flute and tin whistle player, composer and singer.

== Background ==
McDermott was born, and lived all of his life, in the townland of Coolmeen, County Sligo, just outside Ballyfarnon, County Roscommon. His mother sang and played concertina. McDermott used to visit the local house dances and was taught music by James Flynn, a local fiddler. Later he travelled with his whistle, fife and flute and played at many sessions or dances throughout the countryside. While traditional music was his first love, his interests were much broader; he sang in a modern band for a while as a youngster and later joined various combinations playing saxophone and trumpet, also enjoying country and western music, jazz, and céilidhs. He played with numerous groups including the O'Carolan Country Ceili Band, The Down Beaters Ceili Band, and Josie McDermott and the Flynnsmen.

Throughout the 1960s, 70s and 80s McDermott was to be found playing regularly with button accordion player David Sheridan and fiddler Tommy Flynn; this trio were popular all over Connaught and further afield and appeared on many radio and television broadcasts including Ceili House and Bring Down the Lamp.

In 1967 "Josie McDermott and Flynnsmen" were formed with various combinations over the years, the most recent combination was David Sheridan on Button accordion, Tommy Flynn on fiddle, Michael Patrick Sheridan on drums, Mai Harte on flute and McDermott on vocals and playing flute, whistle and sax. Other members over the years included John Flynn, Bernie Joe Mattimoe on drums and Liam Purcell on accordion. For many years this group was popular, playing several nights a week. They appeared on a number of television and radio programmes, including Bring Down the Lamp, Trom agus Éadrom and Ceili House. The group disbanded in the late 1980s. McDermott also made many trips to play in Birmingham along with another flute-player and good friend Peggy McGrath.

In 1962 McDermott, shortly after the death of his mother, lost his sight, living as a blind man for the last 30 years of his life. He continued playing both in a céilidh and a modern dance band. He also composed dance tunes, wrote a number of songs and ballads and took a particular interest in the music of O'Carolan, the great blind harpist.

He died a bachelor with no close relatives in May 1992.

== Documentary ==
McDermott was the subject of a television documentary Cérbh É? Josie McDermott on TG4, first broadcast in December 2009. In this programme, one of a series in which major figures in contemporary traditional music profile and pay homage to a master of their craft from a bygone age, flute player Paul McGrattan traced the life and legacy of McDermott and interviewed those who knew him, including Matt Molloy, Catherine McEvoy, Roger Sherlock, Michael Tubridy, Séamus O'Donnell and pupils Brenda Sweeney and Mai Harte.

== Legacy ==
McDermott composed a number of traditional tunes which have entered the repertoire of many musicians and have been recorded in Ireland and in the United States. He is commemorated annually at a memorial festival in Ballyfarnan, the Josie McDermott Memorial Festival, which includes the Josie McDermott Perpetual Cup Concert Flute Competition.

== All Ireland titles ==
McDermott won the All-Ireland title at the Fleadh Cheoil na hÉireann in three different disciplines. In 1964 he won the tin whistle title, in 1967 the lilting, and the flute in 1974. He was also a proficient member of the Ballyfarnon Scóreacht group which won All Ireland titles in 1967 and 1974.

== Discography ==
- Darby's Farewell LP issued on Topic in 1977 with Robin Morton, who produced the LP, playing bodhran on several tracks. Reissued on CD in 2000.

== Compositions ==
=== Reels ===
- "The Trip to Birmingham"
- "The Salute to Baltimore" (a/k/a "The Lansdowne Lass")
- "Darby's Farewell to London"
- "Father O'Grady's Trip to Bockagh"
- "The Kylemore Maid"
- "Peg McGrath's"

=== Sings and Airs ===
- "The Ballad of O'Carolan Country"
- "The Boatman of Lough Key"
- "Lament for a Fiddle Player"
- "The Pride of the West"
