= Gráinne Hambly =

Irish musician

- Born: c 1975; County Mayo, Ireland
- Era: Traditional

Gráinne Hambly is an internationally known Irish traditional harper, teacher and musician.

== Life and education ==
Hambly was born to Michael Hambly and Mary Joyce in Knockrickard County Mayo, Ireland in 1975. She has 2 musician sisters. She learned traditional Irish music on the tin whistle as a child and then learned the concertina and harp. Hambly won the All-Ireland senior competition in Clonmel in 1994 on the concertina. She also won the Harp Festivals competitions at Keadue in 1994 and Granard in 1995 and the All-Ireland senior harp competition in 1994. She was also a member of the National Folk Orchestra and toured with the Belfast Harp Orchestra founded by Janet Harbison. She graduated initially with a bachelor's degree and then with a master's degree in Music from Queen's University Belfast in 1999. She then completed a graduate diploma in Education (Music) from the University of Limerick.

She is a teacher of traditional Irish music and performs in concerts and festivals internationally as well as having had a number of records produced.

== Works ==
- Between the Showers
- Golden Lights and Green Shadows
- The Thorn Tree
- Music from Ireland and Scotland
- Traditional Irish Music Arranged for Harp
