= Janet Harbison =

- Born: 1955 (age 70–71); Dublin, Ireland
- Genres: Classical; Irish traditional Folk
- Occupations: Composer, Performer, Orchestra Director
- Instrument: Irish Harp
- Years active: 1970 – present
- Labels: RCA Victor; Polygram / Universal
- Website: www.janetharbisonharp.com

Janet Harbison (born 1955) is an Irish harper, composer, teacher and orchestra director.

== Early life and education ==
Born in Dublin in 1955, Harbison came to early prominence with the piano (learning from both grandmothers who were eminent pianists) and the Irish harp which she started in Secondary School (Sion Hill Dominican Convent, Blackrock) with the renowned teacher Máirín Ferriter (formerly Máirín Ní Shéadha). While trained as a classical pianist and a singing harpist, her specialism was to be in traditional music where she was shaped by the community of traditional musicians in the Cultúrlann of Comhaltas Ceoltóirí Éireann local to her home. By 1981, she had won every national harp competition and a number of international prizes including the Isle of Man Millennium Competition and Festival International de l'Harpe Celtique (Awen Trophy).

She had studied music at Trinity College Dublin, the Dublin College of Music and Cork University, with performance on a range of instruments, composition and conducting. In 1984, Harbison moved to Belfast, Northern Ireland to pursue doctoral research and was awarded a two-year Research Fellowship at the Institute of Irish Studies at Queen's University. She was also awarded an honorary doctorate from the University of Ulster, a Flax Trust award for her work with Irish music and Education toward Mutual Understanding (Peace and Reconciliation) in Northern Ireland, and a number of other awards for her work with the Belfast Harp Orchestra.

== Career ==
In 1983, Harbison established Clairseoiri na hEireann (the Harpers' Association) to support traditional harping and oral teaching. The association organised monthly harp sessions in Dublin (at the Piper's Club, Henrietta Street), managed harp festivals and summer schools and established weekly or biweekly harp schools.

From 1986 to 1994, Harbison held the position of Curator of Music at the Ulster Folk and Transport Museum, where she organised an annual calendar of events, festivals and conferences. She made arrangements for the bicentenary of the Belfast Harpers' Assembly in 1992, including: the World Harp Festival, Belfast (a 12-day festival in May featuring over 40 international artists in Belfast concert venues); the Belfast Harpers' Bicentenary Festival (10 days in July comprising an international harp competition, an archiving project and summer school); and a 6-month exhibition at the Ulster Folk and Transport Museum featuring artefacts dating from the original event in 1792.

From 1994, Harbison took up the position of CEO with the Harp Foundation until the organisation and its activities moved to Castleconnell, County Limerick in 2002.

In 2002, Harbison established the Irish Harp Centre in Castleconnell, County Limerick, a residential harp school and college. In 2006, she published her oral Irish Harp Method. Her teaching has been at the forefront of the Irish harp revival with many of Ireland's most prominent performers emerging from her school (including Michael Rooney, Gráinne Hambly and Laoise Kelly). With her teacher and examiner training courses, her method is now in use throughout the harping world and her technique training (the "Chimes") is in universal use.From 2016-20, Janet Harbison was visiting professor of (Irish) Music at the University of Ulster, Derry, N.Ireland and from 2022, an Irish Research Council scholar working on a PhD project at the Dublin Conservatoire of Music (TU Dublin) on the subject of 'The Belfast Harp Orchestra: music, history & politics'.

== Compositions ==
=== Large scale works ===
- Brian Boru, Lion of Ireland (50 minutes) Solo Soprano and Tenor, SATB Choir, Children's Choir, Solo Early Irish (wire) and Irish (lever) harp, Harp Orchestra (6 parts), Solo Bagpipe and Side Drum, and Bagpipe Band (with drum corps)
- Colmcille – A Columban Suite (70 minutes. 1997) Oratorio for SATB chorus, Harp Orchestra (4 parts), Soprano and Tenor solos and 2 Narrators (in Irish and English) (80 mins) The life and times of the 6th century Irish saint in poetry, including excerpts from the Cathach (St. Colmcille's own poetry). (Published on BHO CD: Colmcille)
- A Christmas Cantata (80 minutes. 1993) Choral Suite for Soprano, Alto and Baritone solos, SATB chorus and harp orchestra (8 parts, 70 mins). 12 old Irish Christmas songs (including 2 Wexford Carols) and 3 original songs in Irish, English and Latin (some Macoronic)
- Aifreann d'Arainn (Mass for Aran, 40 minutes. 1983) Mass for voice, harp, uilleann pipes, fiddle, flute and piano (40 mins), adapted for RTÉ film music of Posadh in Inis Oirr (produced Éamon de Buitléar, directed Daith Connaughtan)

=== Smaller scale works ===
- "Battle of Alasdair" (1991) (17 mins) for multiple harps (min. 12 parts) with solos: uilleann pipes (on BHO CD: Carillon), based on the epic harp composition on the death of Alasdair McDonnell (17th century), Lord of the Isles, at the Battle of Cnoc na nOs. (on BHO 001, Belfast Harp Orchestra 1792-1992)
- "Sacred Place" (1999)(16 mins) for multiple harps (min. 4 parts)
- "Ulster Symphony" (1994) (15 mins) for multiple harps (min. 8 parts) with solos: lambeg drum, fife, fiddle. Music includes themes of 'The Boyne Water' and 'The Foggy Dew' and presents the 'story of the troubles' in music (optimistically!)
- "St. John's March" (1984) (12 mins) for multiple harps (min. 3 parts) originally composed as harp solo for the wedding of Thomas and Anne Donaghy at St. John's Abbey, Kilkenny (on BHO: 006, The Wedding Album)
- "Saoire Samhraidh" (1983) (12 mins) Based on the poem by Maire Mhac an tSaoi, for unaccompanied SSA choir, won Oireachtas prize for new works for choirs, 1983
- "Earth Water Wind & Fire" (1992) (11 mins) Composition for multiple harps (min. 8 parts) celebrating the Celtic spirits of nature's elements
- "Bright New Morning" (1995) (10 mins) for multiple harps, uilleann pipes and other traditional instruments (on Polygram: Celtic Harpestry)
- "Liurach Padraig" (1979) (9 mins) for solo voice and harp, or choir and multiple harps (on BHO 003, Live in Downpatrick, BHO 008, Prayer)
- "Walk on Belfast" (1999) (7 mins) originally titled Walk on Cave Hill, the mountain overlooking Belfast Harps (on Polygram: Celtic Harpestry)
- "Laganside Reverie" (1997) (7 mins) for multiple harps (min. 4 parts) composed for opening of Belfast Waterfront Hall
- "Fanfare" (1999) (7 mins) for multiple harps (min. 3 parts) composed for reopening of Magee College, Derry. Also arranged for harp solo
- "Carillon" (1992) (7 mins) Composition for multiple harps (min. 4 parts), dedicated to Derek Bell (of the Chieftains) based on the idea of a peal of bells. Also arranged for harp duo, and harp solo (Title track of BHO CD: Carillon)
- "Tribute to O'Neill" (1985) (6 mins) Composition for multiple harps (min. 2 parts) also arranged as harp solo. Won the Awen Trophy, Festival Internationale de la Harpe Celtique 1985 (on BHO 002, O'Neill's Harper). Published Coup Briez, France
- "Mo Mhathairin" (1984) (4 mins) Composition dedicated to Janet's mother, harp solo (on BHO 002, O'Neill's Harper)
- "Absent Friends" (1985) (4 mins) Dedicated to Prof. Basil Wilson (RIP) (on BHO 006, The Wedding Album)
- "Suantrai" (for Daniel, 1998) (4 mins) Lullaby for the comforting of Janet's brother and his wife on the death of their son Daniel. For multiple harps (min. 2 parts) also harp solo (on BHO 007, Colmcille with BHO and BHO 008, Prayer)
- "Love's Comfort" (1991) (4 mins) Composed when homesick on tour in the US (on Polygram, Harpestry)

== Discography ==
- O'Neill's Harper (1985)
- Janet Harbison with Jim Flannery (Tenor): Thomas Moore – Minstrel of Ireland (Spoken Arts, 1991 & 1998)
- Belfast Harp Orchestra: In Concert (1992)
- The Chieftains with the Belfast Harp Orchestra: The Celtic Harp (RCA Victor, 1993) (Grammy Award Winner)
- Belfast Harp Orchestra: Live in Downpatrick (1993)
- Belfast Harp Orchestra: Carillon (1994)
- Janet Harbison (and 'Clarsheree'): Feasting with Carolan (1995)
- Belfast Harp Orchestra: Colmcille (1997)
- Belfast Harp Orchestra: Celtic Harpistry (CD & DVD, Polygram, 1998)
- Janet Harbison (solo): Prayer (1999)
- Belfast Harp Orchestra: The Best Of The Belfast Harp Orchestra (Laika Records, 2000)
- The Chieftains with the Belfast Harp Orchestra: Water from the Well (RCA Victor, 2000)
- Irish Harp Orchestra: A Christmas Collection (2006)
- Irish Harp Orchestra: The Belfast Years (2007)
- Irish Harp Orchestra: Honour and Glory (2010)
- Masters of the Irish Harp (2011)
- Janet Harbison (solo): Slow Airs (2017)
- Janet Harbison (solo): By Strangford Water (2020)
