= Piaras Ó Lorcáin =

Irish folk singer

Piaras Ó Lorcáin is a traditional Irish singer and beef farmer from Crossmaglen, County Armagh, Ireland. He was featured on RTÉ farming series Saol na Feirme and in a full episode of TG4's Bláth na hÓige in 2023. Ó Lorcáin Started singing professionally at age 8. He plays guitar and bouzouki, but is best known for sean-nós songs, an unaccompanied singing style in the Irish language.

Piaras Ó Lorcáin was the subject of season 1 episode 4 of Bláth na hÓige on the TG4 Irish language streaming service. The seven-part program follows the musical development and collaborations of eight sean-nós singers. Ó Lorcáin is the only artist on the project from a non-Gaeltacht, or non-Irish language speaking area. The project also includes a collaborative album of the same name under the musical direction of Síle Denvir and Colm Mac Con Iomaire. In addition to Ó Lorcáin, the recording ensemble Bláth na hÓige showcases the work of Caoimhe and Séamus Ó Flatharta, Méabh Ní Bheaglaoich, Cathal Ó Curráin, Megan Nic Ruairí, and Máire and Étáin Ní Churraoin.

Ó Lorcáin won the Corn Sheosamh Uí Eanaigh at the Oireachtas na Gaeilge in 2016, and has won in numerous age categories in both Irish and English singing in Fleadh Ceoil na hÉireann.
