= Gearóid Ó hAllmhuráin =

Irish musicologist (born 1955)

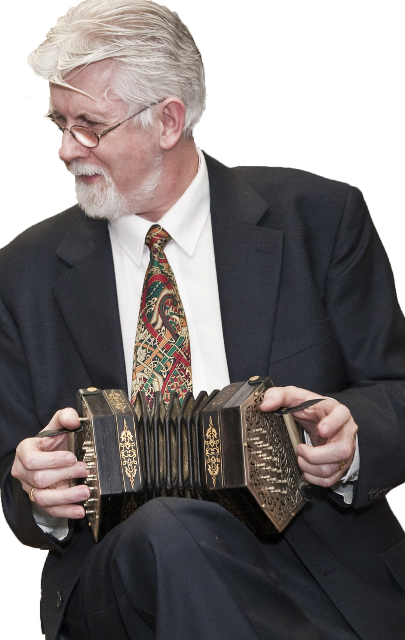
- Born: May 28, 1955 (age 71); Ennis, County Clare, Ireland

Academic work
- Discipline: Musicology
- Website: Official website

Gearóid Ó hAllmhuráin (born 28 May 1955) is an Irish ethnomusicologist, author, musician and historian specialising in Irish music, diaspora, cultural and memory studies.

== Profile ==
Born in Ennis, County Clare, Ó hAllmhuráin was a former member of The Kilfenora Céilí Band. He is a five-times All Ireland Champion musician (uilleann pipes, concertina and céili band). He learned from Clare concertina master Paddy Murphy. He has performed and recorded with noted Irish fiddlers Paddy Canny, Peadar O'Loughlin, Martin Hayes, and Patrick Ourceau, as well as French-Canadian fiddle master Pierre Schryer.

Ó hAllmhuráin studied at University College Cork, Trinity College Dublin, Université de la Sorbonne (Paris IV), Université de Toulon et du Var, and received a PhD in social anthropology and ethnomusicology from Queen's University Belfast in 1990, where he studied with John Blacking. From 2000–2009, he was Jefferson Smurfit Professor of Irish Studies and Professor of Music at the University of Missouri–St. Louis.

Since 2009, he is the inaugural holder of the Johnson Chair in Quebec and Canadian Irish Studies at Concordia University, Montreal, Quebec. One of only a handful of universities offering a Major, Minor and Certificate in Irish Studies, the School of Canadian Irish Studies courses focus on Ireland's history and culture, its modern transformation in the Celtic Tiger era, and the social, cultural, economic, religious, educational and political contributions of Irish immigrants to Canada. The Johnson Chair focuses on the contributions of Quebecers of Irish origin to the social, cultural, religious and economic evolution of Quebec.

In 2014, Ó hAllmhuráin was producer on the Paddy Murphy Memorial Project: Preserving the Music and Legacy of a Pioneer of the Irish Concertina Paddy Murphy in Fiach Roe, County Clare. In 2019, he made the documentary Lost Children of the Carricks with Celtic Crossings Productions. He was a contributor to The Encyclopaedia of Music in Ireland (University College Dublin Press, 2013); Companion to Irish Traditional Music (Cork University Press, 2011); and The Celts in the Americas (University of Cape Breton Press, 2013), and consultant on the documentary Photos to Send: Retracing Dorothy Lange’s Travels through Ireland.

== Selected publications ==
- A Pocket History of Irish Traditional Music. Pocket History series. Dublin: O'Brien Press. 1998. ISBN 086278820X.
- Flowing Tides–History and Memory in an Irish Soundscape. New York: Oxford University Press. 2016. ISBN 9780199380084.
- A Short History Of Irish Traditional Music. Dublin: O'Brien Press. 2017. ISBN 9781847179401.

== Recordings ==
- Traditional Music From Clare and Beyond (Celtic Crossings, San Francisco, 1996) with Irish fiddlers Paddy Canny, Peader O'Loughlin, Martin Hayes
- Tracin' – Traditional Music from the West of Ireland, classic duet CD with fiddler Patrick Ourceau (Celtic Crossings, San Francisco, 1999)
- The Independence Suite – Traditional Music from Ireland, Scotland and Cape Breton (Celtic Crossings, San Francisco, 2004)
- Paddy Murphy: Field Recordings from a Pioneer of the Irish Concertina (2007), which was also published as a digital archive (Celtic Crossings, San Francisco, 2008)
