= Episcopal Chapel and Asylum for Penitent Females, Baggot Street, Dublin =

Protestant chapel and home in Dublin, Ireland

Episcopal Chapel and Asylum for Penitent Females
- Interactive map of the Episcopal Chapel and Asylum for Penitent Females area

General information
- Type: Chapel
- Classification: Demolished
- Location: Baggot Street, Dublin, Ireland
- Coordinates: 53.333166°N 6.243789°W
- Construction started: 1832
- Completed: 1835

Episcopal Chapel and Asylum for Penitent Females, was Protestant "Magdalene" asylum for "fallen women" and an Episcopal Chapel on Upper Baggot Street in Dublin. It was located on the corner of Baggot Street Upper and Waterloo Road in Dublin. The asylum could accommodate 50 penitent women and the chapel could accommodate 1,200 worshipers, it was run by a committee of benevolent donors.

It was built between 1832 and 1835, it opened in 1835 and closed in 1945.

In 1858 a trust was set up for Episcopal Chapel and Asylum for Penitent Females Upper Baggot St., Dublin. This Asylum was described as being one of the first activities of the Church of Ireland's, Dublin City Mission. It could accommodate 30 women.

The building was demolished and offices and retail outlets, built on the site.

The Very Rev. Hamilton Verschoyle, future Bishop of Kilmore, Elphin and Ardagh, served as a chaplain in Baggot Street. Rev. J Sandford, served as Assistant Chaplain as did Rev. J. J. Frew. Rev. Ambrose Wellesley Leet, D.D. served as Chaplain.

== Similar Institutions ==
Other similar protestant run institutions for "fallen women" in Ireland were

- Bethany Home, Rathgar, Dublin.
- Bethesda Chapel, Dublin, the chapel had a female orphanage, and Locks Penitentiary for women.
- Dublin Female Penitentiary, between Berkeley Road, Eccles St. and North Circular Road
- Magdalen Asylum (Denny House) Leeson Street, Dublin.
- Magdalene Asylum in Cork (Sawmill Street)
- Dublin by Lamplight, Ballsbridge, Dublin.
- Ulster Female Penitentiary, Belfast.
- Ulster Magdalene Asylum, Belfast.
