= Westbank Orphanage =

Former Protestant orphanage in Ireland

Westbank Orphanage (sometimes called Westbank Protestant Orphanage or Westbank Children's Home) was a privately run Protestant orphanage in Greystones, County Wicklow, Ireland, which closed in the 1990s. Westbank was originally founded as the Protestant Home for Orphan & Destitute Girls. It moved from Harold's Cross in Dublin to Wicklow in the late 1940s, and began to accept boys as well as girls. The regime at the orphanage was Protestant evangelical Christian and was run by Miss Adeline Mathers, a born-again Christian. While it attempted to find homes for some children with Protestant families, many were retained as helpers and as a means of raising funds. Some children were sent illegally to families in Northern Ireland, England, and Scotland. The orphanage became controversial when allegations of abuses surfaced. In the 1960s children from another related and equally controversial Protestant home, the Bethany Home, were transferred to Westbank. The orphanage was designated by the Church of Ireland and the state as place to send Protestant orphans. Westbank children were sent to worship in Bray Gospel Hall. The orphanage was run by the Westbank Greystones Protestant Orphanage Charity, associated with Bray Gospel Hall. It was registered as a charity and availed of tax benefits as a result.

Former residents of the Westbank Orphanage, Greystones and Ovoca House in Wicklow, demanded inclusion in the Irish Government's 2002 redress scheme, and an apology.

After closure in the late 1990s, records were transferred to the PACT (Protestant Adoption Society). After broadcast of abuse allegations in the RTE documentary, 'Aunties Family Secrets' (5 June 2011), Westbank administrators demanded return of the records.

== Protestant Home for Orphan & Destitute Girls, Harolds Cross, Dublin ==
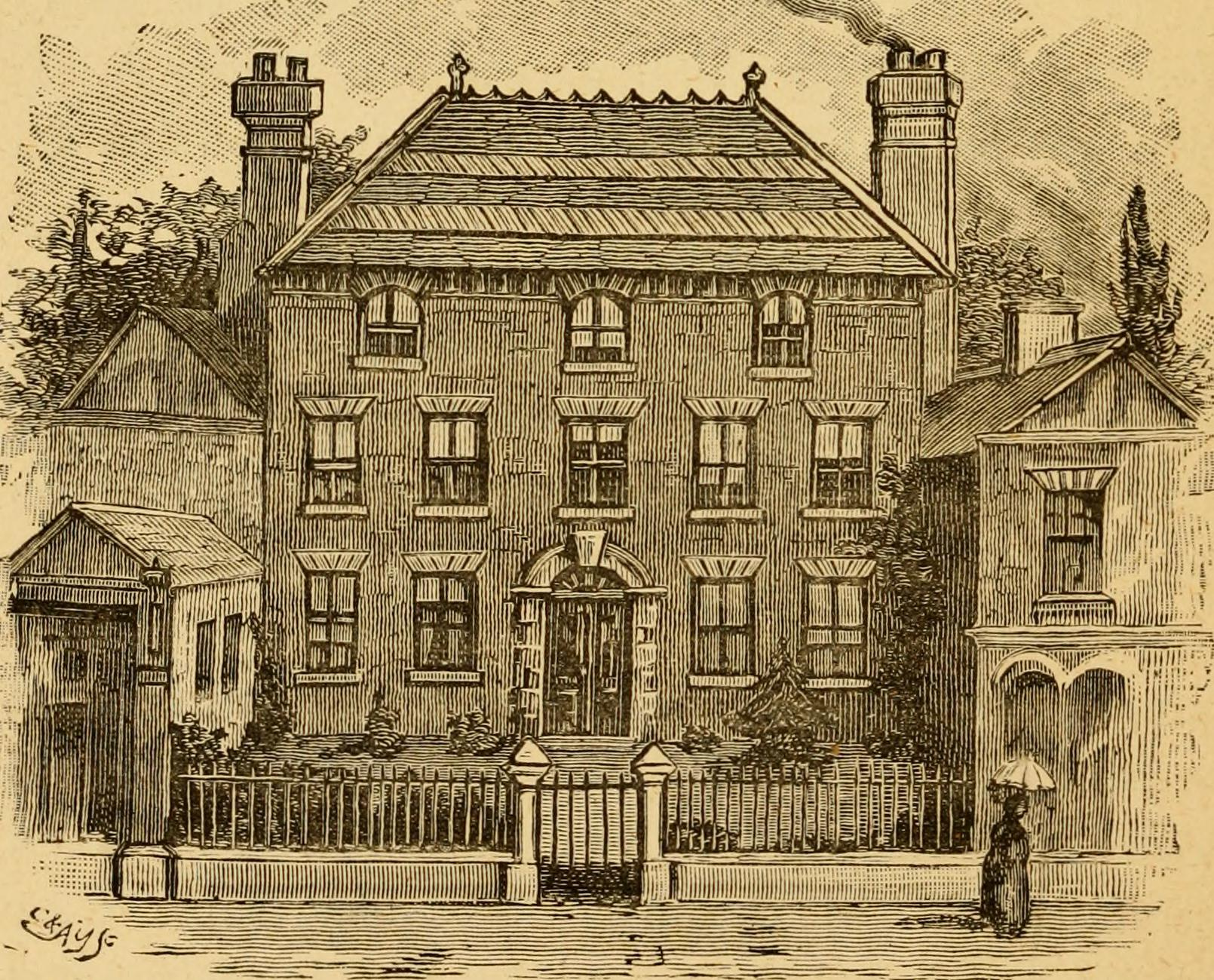
Westbank Orphanage at 201 Harold's Cross. It was previously the home where Richard Allen was born in 1803.

The Protestant Home for Orphan & Destitute Girls in Harolds Cross, Dublin, was established around 1860 in No. 201 Harolds Cross, in the house where the Quaker, the famous slavery abolitionist Richard Allen was born, in the home of his parents, a large red brick building dating from the mid-18th century. The Orphanage moved to Wicklow in the 1940s.

== See also ==
- Bethany Home, Rathgar, Dublin
- Belvedere Protestant Children's Orphanage, Tyrrellspass, Co. Westmeath.
- Bethesda Chapel and Female Orphan School, Dorset Street, Dublin.
- Kirwan House, North Circular Rd, Dublin.
- Magdalen Asylum Leeson Street, Dublin.
- PACT (Protestant Adoption Society)
- Smyly Homes, Dublin.
