= Dar al-Reaya =

Saudi government institutions for women and girls

Dar al-Reaya (دار الرعاية), or "care homes", are a type of institution for girls and women ages seven to 30 run by Saudi Arabia's Ministry of Human Resources and Social Development. According to Saudi officials, they provide "shelter for girls accused or convicted of various crimes" and are used to "rehabilitate the female inmates" with the help of psychiatrists "to return them to their family". Sources outside the Saudi government have characterized the Dar al-Reaya as "jails" for women whose families wish to institutionalize them for disobedience, extramarital sexual relations or being absent from home. Some women are sent to Dar al-Reaya to protect a family's reputation after a woman is sexually abused by a brother or father.

There are at least 11 Dar al-Reaya facilities, some in major Saudi cities including Dammam, Jeddah, Jizan, Riyadh, and Tabuk. The number of girls and women currently held in Dar al-Reaya is unclear, as there are no formal statistics; in 2016, the most recent year data was published, 233 girls and women were being held across seven Dar al-Reaya facilities.

== Conditions ==
Facilities differ in conditions depending on location and staff.

Upon arrival, women's phones are confiscated and women are put into solitary confinement, with most facilities holding them there for a few days; however, in some cases women have been left in solitary confinement for weeks or months.

The women held in Dar al-Reaya "are forbidden from speaking to each other or showing outward signs of happiness," and are fed twice a day, with their breakfast containing sedatives. They are also subject to floggings, the number of which are based on the charge for which they were institutionalized. These floggings take place weekly. Additional floggings or solitary confinement may be given to women who break rules within the facility. The women are also subject to abuse and sexual harassment from guards, forced religious teachings, and are not allowed visits or contact with the outside world. Activist in exile Sarah Al-Yahia said that women are referred to by numbers rather than names. Due to the conditions, some women have attempted self-harm or suicide.

Some facilities have better conditions, with women having more access to books or opportunities for supervised excursions.

Women can only be released with the permission of their family or a male guardian, when "rehabilitated". For women 30 or older whose guardians refuse to allow them to return home, they are transferred to "Dar Al Theyafa" (also romanized as "Dar al-Dheyafa"), or "houses of hospitality". Women are only able to leave the Dar Al Theyafa through an arranged marriage.

== History ==
The Dar al-Reaya were established in the 1960s.

Women's rights activists have criticized the Dar al-Reaya and called for changes to the Saudi guardianship system. External human rights groups (such as Human Rights Watch) and governments have also called for the closing or reform of the Dar al-Reaya.

== See also ==
- Bethany Home
- Dublin Female Penitentiary
- Magdalene laundries in Ireland
- Magdalene asylums
- Ulster Magdalene Asylum
