= Kirwan House =

Former Protestant orphanage for females in Dublin, Ireland

Coordinates: 53.3578365°N 6.2866343°W

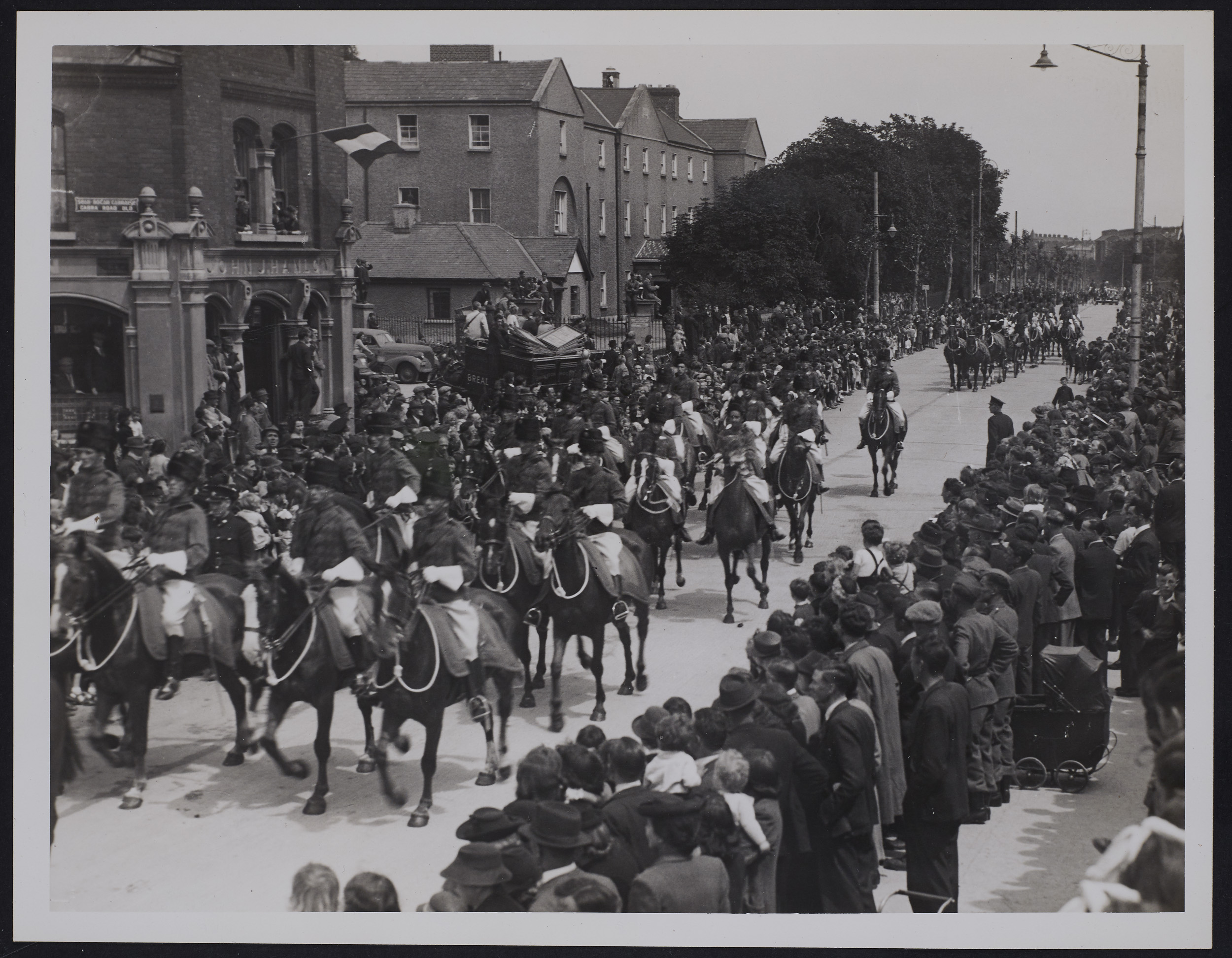
Kirwan House seen here to the rear during Seán T. O'Kelly's inauguratuion parade in June 1945 passing Hanlon's corner.

Kirwan House or The Female Orphan House was a Church of Ireland-run female orphanage in Dublin, Ireland initially located at 42 Prussia Street (1790-93), then on the North Circular Road (1793-1959) and finally at 134 Sandford Road in Ranelagh (1959-87).

Since 1991, Kirwan House has operated as a Trust Fund to award bursaries to assist in the education of children who were Church of Ireland or of other Reformed Faith/Protestant Churches in Ireland, who were in need.

== History ==
The Female Orphan Society was established in Dublin, in 1790 and is one of Ireland's oldest extant charities, incorporated in one of the last acts of the Irish Parliament before the Act of Union in 1800.

"Destitute Girls" (whose both parents were deceased) were placed in the home, and were instructed in the Protestant faith and were trained to be domestic servants.

The Female Orphan House was founded by Mrs. Ann Tighe and Mrs. Margaret Este (who died in 1791 and was succeeded by Elizabeth La Touche) initially in a small property at 42 Prussia Street in Stoneybatter.

Since 1991, Kirwan House has operated as a Trust Fund to award bursaries to assist in the education of children who were Church of Ireland or of other Reformed Faith/Protestant Churches in Ireland, who were in need.

=== Kirwan House (Park House) ===
In 1792, the architect Whitmore Davis was engaged by the banker John LaTouche to design a building to be constructed on land owned by Charles Stanley Monck, Esq and named Kirwan House after the Dean of Killala, Walter Blake Kirwan, who preached sermons regarding the establishment of such an institution and was responsible for raising the majority of the funds. The orphanage moved into its own dedicated building on the North Circular Road around 1793.

A copper plaque on the front of the building was said to have read "The first stone of this house was laid by Mrs. Elizabeth LaTouche, consort of Peter LaTouche esquire, city of Dublin on the 12th of June 1792; Whitmore Davis architect". On the same day Peter LaTouche was said to have given £500 towards the building.

After the Female Orphan House moved to the North Circular Road, the 42 Prussia Street building became The Orphan House for Destitute Boys, which operated until 1802 when it closed for unknown reasons.

=== Chapel (1818) ===
The architect of the Chapel on the North Circular Road, built-in 1818 was William Farrell renowned for many Church of Ireland buildings, and contained plasterwork by the renowned stuccodore George Stapleton. The Chapel was opened by Bishop Charles Brodrick (whose family were associated with the institution) and Bishop John Jebb preached the sermon. The chapel contained fine stained glass dedicated to the LaTouche family.

=== 19th and 20th century ===
The Home was visited by George IV in 1821 during his visit to Ireland. stopping on his way to the Viceregal Lodge in the Phoenix Park. The king ordered shirts from the orphanage produced by the orphans' needlework, and he presented 100 wooden bedsteads to the home.

The home had accommodation for 160 orphans and an episcopal chapel. For a time some land in the Phoenix Park was allocated to the home to provide cattle for the production of milk.

Regardless of their religion before entering the Institution, the girls were brought up in the Anglican faith. The Institution was funded through government grants, subscriptions, donations, and the proceeds of the work of the girls.

The La Touche family having a long history associated with the home, William Blake Kirwan named his son Anthony La Touche Kirwan, Peter La Touche and his brother John were governors of Kirwan House, Peters's wife, Elizabeth, was headmistress, in 1942 the last La Touche associated with the Home Miss Mary La Touche who was governor died.

Rev. Charles Dickinson DD, who became Anglican Bishop of Meath served as chaplain to the home for 12 years, from 1822 to 1833 years, visiting the home twice a week to deliver religious instruction. Rev. Cadwallader Wolseley served as chaplain and secretary, for 20 years from 1833 to 1853, and governor until his death. Rev. John Rogerson Cotter AM, served as chaplain.

1830 seen the school move from St. Paul's (Church of Ireland) parish to the newly established All Saints Church, Grangegorman parish.

A Brief Record of The Female Orphan House, North Circular Road, Dublin, For over one hundred years, from 1790 to 1892 was printed in 1893 about the orphanage.

The Church of Ireland Archbishop of Dublin would have been chair of the board of governors, The Queen was the patroness and president, and the Dowager Duchess of Abercorn was the vice patroness.

Rev. Henry Taylor in 1901 leased the lands owned by the home, to Bohemians F.C. upon which Dalymount Park was developed.

In 1943 another Protestant run orphanage Belvedere Protestant Children's Orphanage, in Westmeath, closed and the remaining four orphans were transferred to Kirwan House.

Kirwan House would have been associated with another Church of Ireland designated Mother and Child Home, the Bethany Home, with mothers and children transferred between them

=== Closure as a home ===
The Pleasants Asylum on Camden Street (established 1818) and the T.P. Dormer Trust were merged with Kirwan House Trust in 1949.

By the 1950s only 13 orphans remained in Park House on the North Circular Road and it was agreed to move them to the nearby and far smaller parsonage which was later also renamed as Kirwan House. It was agreed to sell the old and far larger Kirwan House in 1955 with the buildings including the chapel and gate house sold off at auction on 5 October 1958.

In 1959 the home moved to 134 Sandford Road, Ranelagh which itself was sold in 1987, and funds put into the Kirwan House Trust. A tombstone was erected following donations in 1859 on a plot in Mount Jerome Cemetery, Dublin, where orphans who died were interred in without their names. A former matron of the orphanage, Eliza Shiels, is buried in a marked grave beside the home's plot.

The building was sold and home and church were demolished, despite hopes, that some of the architecture would be preserved. As of 2023, only the parsonage remains at 195 North Circular Road as a protected structure.

=== Park House and Kirwan House office complex ===
In 1972, a modern complex of buildings was developed on the site by the McInerney family. Initially intended to be a hotel, the buildings were never used for this purpose and the development was turned into an office block named Park House and Kirwan House designed by Downes Meehan and Robson architects. The block was constructed on a podium with deep recessed tinted windows.

In 2017, Dublin Institute of Technology, now known as Technological University Dublin acquired the buildings to be incorporate them into its new campus.

== Chaplains ==
- Rev. Henry Campbell A.B. - 1791, priest in St. Paul's, Smithfield.
- Rev. Charles Mayne - 1816
- Rev. John Rogerson Cotter - 1818
- Rev. Charles Dickinson DD - 1822-1833, Bishop of Meath (1840-1842)
- Rev. Cadwallader Wolseley MA - 1833-1853
- Rev. Edward Lysaght - 1853
- Rev. James Peed MA - 1853
- Rev. David H. Elrington - 1855
- Rev. William J. Mulloy - 1857
- Rev. John Digby Cooke - 1865
- Rev. J.M. Harden - 1899-1901, later Bishop of Tuam(1928-1931)
- Rev. Henry Taylor - 1901
- Rev. William Herbert Charles Walford Turl - 1923-1925
- Rev. Charles Trevelyan Aubrey Carter, 1943-1952

== See also ==
- Bethany Home, Rathgar, Dublin
- Belvedere Protestant Children's Orphanage, Tyrrellspass, Co. Westmeath.
- Bethesda Chapel and Female Orphan School, Dorset Street, Dublin.
- Magdalen Asylum Leeson Street, Dublin.
- Westbank Orphanage, Greystones, Co. Wicklow
- PACT (Protestant Adoption Society)
- St Mary's House for destitute protestant females (Damer House), 27 Parnell Street
- Lamplight Laundry, Ballsbridge
