= Belvedere Protestant Children's Orphanage =

Belvedere Protestant Children's Orphanage or Belvedere Home was a Protestant-run children's orphanage in Tyrrellspass, Co. Westmeath which had a Church of Ireland ethos. The Orphanage was founded as a charitable institution at the bequest of Jane, the Countess of Belvedere, who left 6000 pounds to set up a girls orphanage. Built in 1842 in the Tudor revival style, off the Mullingar road, the orphanage was set up in 1843 by the established Protestant church in Ireland to cater for orphans from Protestant families. Anne Somerville (née Armstrong) was Matron, of the orphanage and was succeeded by her daughter-in-law also Anne.

In 1943 the Orphanage closed and the remaining children transferred to another Church of Ireland run home, Kirwan House, in Dublin. The buildings were sold to Westmeath County Council in 1986, but have fallen into decay in recent times. There is also calls for the former orphanage to be developed for some civic use. The Cottages which formed the orphanage, the matrons house, wall and gateway are protected structures. The Cottages were developed into energy efficient social housing and completed in 2006.

== See also ==
- Bethany Home, Rathgar, Dublin
- Bethesda Chapel and Female Orphan School, Dorset Street, Dublin.
- Kirwan House, North Circular Rd, Dublin.
- Magdalen Asylum Leeson Street, Dublin.
- PACT (Protestant Adoption Society)
- Smyly Homes, Dublin.
- Westbank Orphanage, Greystones, Co. Wicklow
