= Dublin Female Penitentiary =

Institution for "fallen women" in Dublin

Coordinates: 53.36062°N 6.26776°W

Dublin Female Penitentiary was a reform institution for "fallen women" in Dublin, Ireland. It was established in 1810 and opened in 1813. It was run by the Church of Ireland and located between Berkeley Road, Eccles Street and North Circular Road. The institution could cater for over 40 inmates.

It was administered by a committee of ladies, for the religious and moral improvement of the women. While inmates were from all religious backgrounds (some other such institutions only accepted women of the religion of the institution), they had to adhere to the rules of the house and were instructed in the reformed faith. As with many protestant benevolent initiatives, many laywomen were involved. Mrs. Paulus Aemilius Singer of Temple Street, who served as secretary of the committee, was a notable supporter of the institution.

Penitents were employed in a laundry, washing and mangling, and also performed needlework, hatmaking and mantua-making. As with other similar institutions, the penitentiary was affiliated to a chapel (St. Augustine's Church, a chapel of ease in the parish of St George). There was a Repository where the penitents' work was sold, with income used to fund the institution. After eighteen months, places outside the laundry were sought for an inmate. Some inmates were sent to Queensland, Australia.

In 1840, the trustees put the chaplaincy under the visitation and clergy officiate under licence from the Church of Ireland Archbishop of Dublin.

== Associated people ==
Viscount Lorton served as Governor. Baronet Sir Robert Shaw acted as treasurer. Rev. William Burgh served as Chaplain to St. Augustine's from 1826 to 1847, Rev. William Jameson (of the whiskey producing family), Chaplain, Rev. N. W. Carre, Rev. Charles Brough and Rev. Robert Halpen also served as chaplains. A Rev. John Paine Sargent and a Rev. D. Flynn was an assistant chaplain. Anne Kathrens served as Matron.

== Similar institutions ==
Other similar protestant run institutions for "fallen women" in Ireland were

- Bethany Home, Rathgar, Dublin
- Bethesda Chapel, Dublin - the chapel had a female orphanage, and Locks Penitentiary for women
- Dublin by Lamplight, Ballsbridge, Dublin
- Episcopal Chapel and Asylum for Penitent Females, Baggot Street, Dublin
- Magdalen Asylum (Denny House) Leeson Street, Dublin
- Magdalene Asylum in Cork (Sawmill Street)
- Ulster Female Penitentiary, Belfast
- Ulster Magdalene Asylum, Belfast
