= White-Williams Scholars =

White-Williams Scholars is an education charity that assists underprivileged children in the Philadelphia, Pennsylvania area. It is one of the oldest charitable organizations in the United States. In 2011, White-Williams Scholars merged with Philadelphia Futures, another education organization in the area.

In September, 2011 the newly combined organization undertook a comprehensive strategic planning process. The Strategic Plan was developed with the input of over 150 stakeholders and was approved by the Board of Directors on July 19, 2012. .

Beginning in 2013, White-Williams Scholars started granting White-Williams Scholars Incentive Awards three times per year to eligible high school students participating in Philadelphia Futures’ Sponsor-A-Scholar and College Connection Programs. Award recipients had to exhibit academic excellence, commendable character and positive and active engagement in program classes and activities.

== History of White-Williams Scholars ==
White-Williams Scholars was founded in 1800 as the Magdalen Society., White-Williams Scholars is one of the oldest charities in the United States. White-Williams Scholars helped low-income students with the financial resources necessary to cover educational costs, enable them to focus on their studies and support their academic goals in high school. For many decades, this was achieved by providing monthly financial stipends that helped students stay focused on their studies. The organization also developed the concept of in-school guidance counseling.

Starting in 1995, White-Williams Scholars also began serving as the Administrator for The Charles E. Ellis Trust for Girls, which funds opportunities for girls in Philadelphia who live in low-income, single-parent families.

In 2006, White-Williams Scholars expanded its offerings, providing college preparation through direct service programs.

== History of Philadelphia Futures ==
Established in 1989, Philadelphia Futures was established to help low-income, first-generation-to-college students in Philadelphia enter – and succeed in – college. Since 1990, its program, Sponsor-A-Scholar (SAS), has grown from a mentoring and scholarship program into a comprehensive, intensive, multi-year array of year-round services.

Each fall, Philadelphia Futures publishes the Step Up to College Guide: Philadelphia’s Guide to the College Preparation, Application, Admissions & Financial Aid Processes. More than 42,000 print copies of the Guide are distributed free of charge to public, public charter and parochial high schools as well as the Free Library of Philadelphia, community-based organizations and government offices.

In 2013, Philadelphia Futures launched its new College Connection Program and Outreach Futures initiative. College Connection offers low-income, high-achieving Philadelphia students personalized college guidance and support from 11th grade through college completion.

== See also ==
- Magdalene asylum
- Magdalen Society of Philadelphia
