= Tom McClean =

British soldier

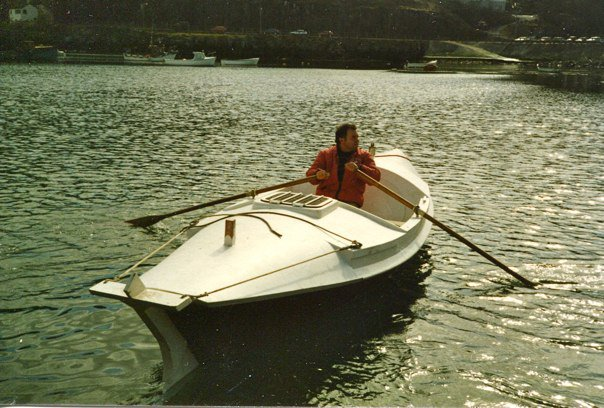
- McClean - Sea Trials - Mallaig, 1985
- Born: 12 February 1943 (age 83)
- Occupations: Adventure center owner Motivational speaker
- Spouse: Jill McClean
- Children: 2
- Website: http://www.motivationspeaker.co.uk

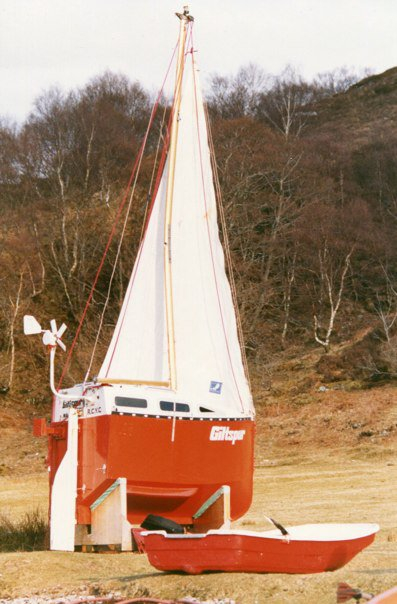
Giltspur - Tom McClean's Record Breaking Boat

Tom McClean is a veteran of both the Parachute Regiment and the Special Air Service (SAS) and is a survival expert who lived on the island of Rockall from 26 May to 4 July 1985 to affirm Britain's claim to it; this is the third longest human occupancy of the island, surpassed in 1997 by a team from Greenpeace which spent 42 days on the island, and in 2014 by Nick Hancock who spent 45 days there.

== Early life ==
Having been abandoned as a baby, McClean lived the 1st years of his life as an orphan at Bethany Home in Dublin, Ireland. He spent much of his teenage years working on a farm until he was bored and enlisted in the British Army. After Blyth and Ridgway rowed the Atlantic in 1966, McClean announced to both that he was going to complete this alone.

== Military career ==
McClean started his military career in the Parachute Regiment and then progressed into the SAS for nine years.

== Civilian life ==
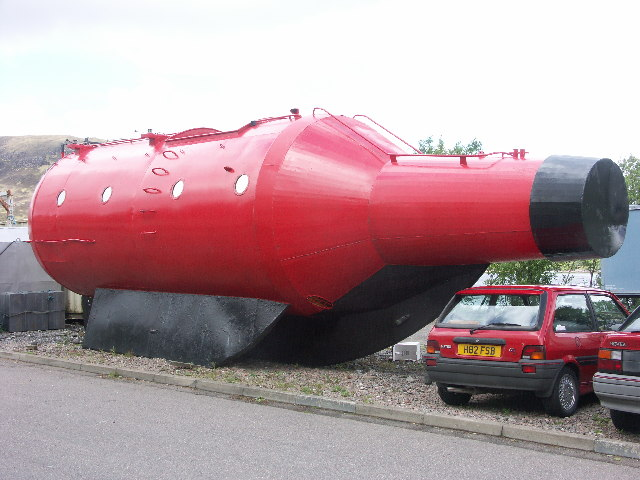
The vessel McClean used to cross the Atlantic in 1990.

Following his retirement from military service, McClean gained fame for numerous feats of endurance. He holds the world record as the first man to row across the Atlantic Ocean from west to east solo which he did in 1969. In 1982 he sailed across the Atlantic in the smallest boat to accomplish that crossing. The self-built boat measured 9 feet and 9 inches, and because of the weight of the food took seven weeks to cross. His record was broken three weeks later by a sailor manning a 9 feet and 1 inch long boat. In response McClean, used a chainsaw to cut two feet off his own vessel making it 7 feet and 9 inches long. During the return trip he lost his mast and the journey took even longer than his first attempt but he regained the record.

In 1985 McClean lived on Rockall from 26 May to 4 July and thereby reaffirmed the United Kingdom's claim to the island. Two years later, the then 44-year-old McClean set about regaining his transatlantic rowing record and achieved his goal crossing the Atlantic in 54 days; a record still held.

In 1990 McClean completed a west-east crossing in a 37 ft bottle-shaped vessel, which had been constructed at Market Harborough by Springer Engineering, a firm with a past history of steel fabrication and narrowboat construction. The Typhoo Atlantic Challenger sailed from New York to Falmouth. This vessel is now preserved at Fort William Diving Centre. McClean's most recent feat was the construction, in 1996, of a boat shaped like a giant whale, which completed a circumnavigation of Britain. The boat, 'Moby' Prince of Whales, stands 25 ft high and 65 ft long. It has a spout which can launch water as high as 6 metres in the air. The Moby Dick, as of 2017, is in the process of conversion to electric power for an Atlantic crossing.

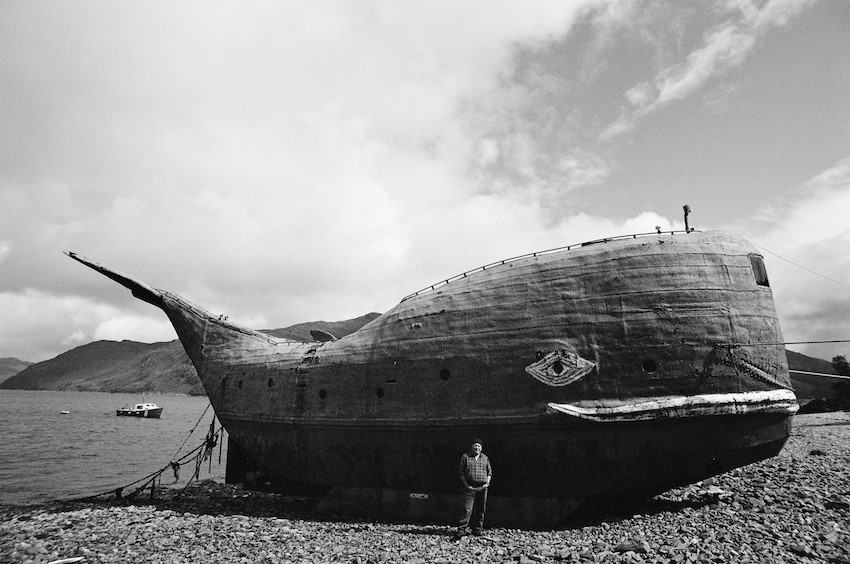
McClean and the Moby Dick in 2020

He was the subject of This Is Your Life in 1987 when he was surprised by Eamonn Andrews. Most recently, McClean was the subject of the 2023 biography Completely Mad: Tom McClean, John Fairfax, and the Epic Race to Row Solo Across the Atlantic by James R. Hansen.
