= Richard Allen (abolitionist) =

Irish draper, philanthropist and abolitionist (1803–1886)

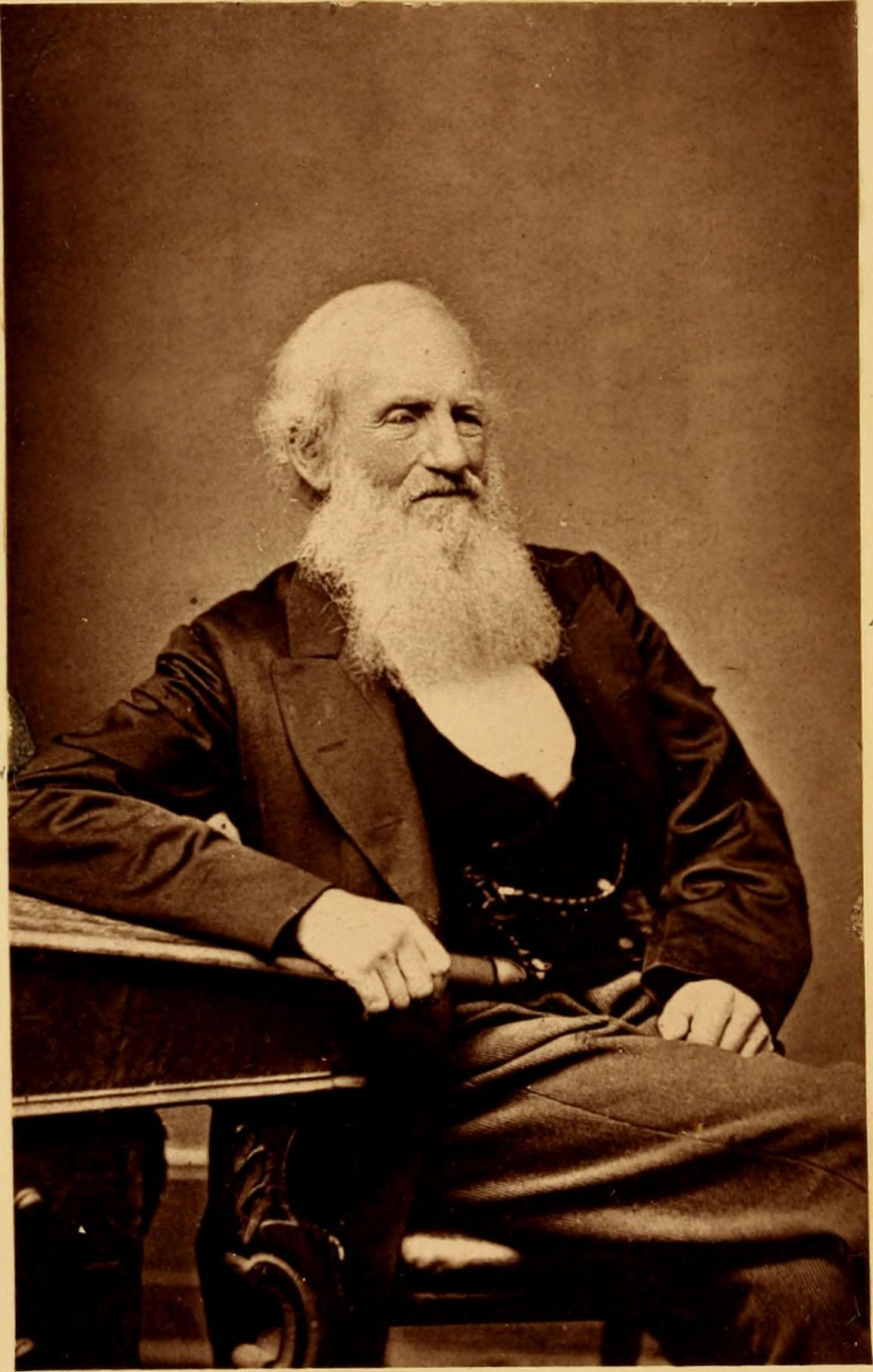
- Allen pictured in his biography
- Born: 8 January 1803; Harolds Cross, Dublin, Ireland
- Died: 19 January 1886 (aged 83); Monkstown, Dublin
- Occupation: Draper
- Spouses: Anne Allen (m. 1826); Mary Ann Allen (m. 1873)

Richard Allen (8 January 1803 – 19 January 1886) was an Irish draper, philanthropist, abolitionist, and temperance campaigner. Allen raised £20,000 to help the Irish famine by writing letters to America.

== Early life ==
Allen was born on 8 January 1803 in Harold's Cross, Dublin to Edward Allen, a draper, and Ellen Allen (née Burton). (Note: Also cited as Eleanor Allen.) One of fifteen siblings, Allen was raised in a Quaker family. Allen was educated at home by a tutor.

== Career ==
In 1820, Allen entered his father's firm. Allen later founded his own firm in 1830, which would later fail around 1844 due to his preoccupation with philanthropist causes. In 1837, Allen was one of three founding members, with James Haughton and Richard Davis Webb, of the Hibernian Antislavery Association. This was not the first antislavery association but it was acknowledged to be the most active. Allen served as the secretary of this association.

The painting which shows Allen at the 1840 Anti-Slavery Convention. Move your cursor to identify Allen who is a small figure below the speakers raised hand or click icon to enlarge

Allen founded the Irish Temperance and Literary Gazette and used this publication to forward his ideas and those of the Anti-Slavery Association.

Opposition to slavery in Ireland had a long pedigree. As was the case in Britain, its most prominent Irish supporters were Protestant, notably Methodists, Quakers and Unitarians, and meetings were generally held in Nonconformist churches. One of the greatest contributions to the anti-slavery debate was made by the flamboyant and controversial Irish nationalist, Daniel O’Connell, champion of Catholic Emancipation.

Richard Allen's parents home is proposed to be a protected building, because Allen was brought up there and also because it became a Plymouth Brethren Orphanage around 1860.

In 1840 his portrait was included with other notables in a painting of the 1840 World Anti-Slavery Convention in London.

In 1846, Allen attended another World convention in London. This time the subject was temperance and Allen was one of the speakers. Allen noted that he had been visiting Dublin's Bridewell prison and considered that parts were becoming empty because of the increase intemperance.

Famine was rife in Ireland and in 1847 Allen wrote letters to America to explain the people's plight. William Lloyd Garrison acknowledged the effect that Allen's letters to America had attracted. He estimated that £20,000 had been raised.

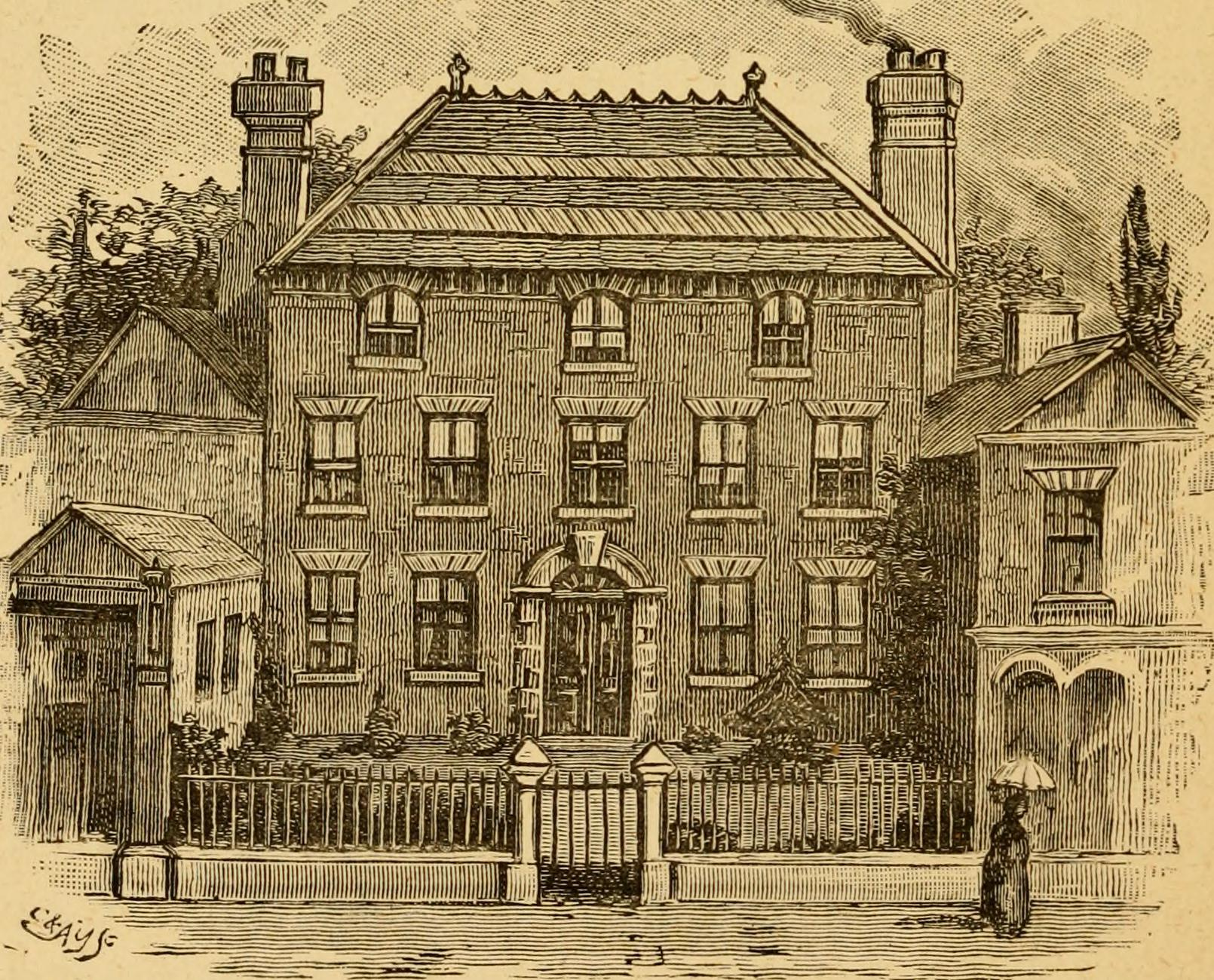
Richard Allen's house at 201 Harold's Cross, Dublin. The building is still standing as of 2021.

== Personal life ==
Allen married first married Anne Allen (née Webb; died 1868) in 1826, and Mary Ann Allen (née Savage) in 1873.

On 19 January 1886, Allen died at his home in Monkstown, Dublin.
