= Charles Dickinson (bishop) =

Irish Anglican bishop

Charles John Dickinson (1792–1842) was an Anglican bishop in the Church of Ireland and Privy Councillor. Born in Cork in August 1792, he was the son of Charles Dickinson, a brazier, and educated at Trinity College, Dublin, where he obtained scientific and classical prizes, and was in 1813 elected scholar before being ordained in 1818. At Dublin he was close a friend of Charles Wolfe and Hercules Henry Graves (1794–1817), brother of Robert James Graves. His tutor, Thomas Meredith, "reckoned by many as the best lecturer and tutor of his time in college, was so impressed with the manly talents of his pupil (Dickinson), that he urged him to direct his thoughts to the Bar, as the certain road to speedy and high advancement". Nonetheless, he pursued a career in the church and his first post was at Castleknock after which he was Chaplain of the Dublin Female Orphan Home (Kirwan House). In 1832 he became Chaplain to the Archbishop of Dublin and the following year the incumbent at St. Ann's Church, Dawson Street. He became Bishop of Meath in 1840 and died in post on 12 July 1842.

Reverend Hercules Dickinson (1827–1905), later Dean of Chapel Royal, Dublin was among his sons.

== Works ==
[Anonymously] Pastoral Epistle from His Holiness the Pope to Some Members of the University of Oxford.

Anglican Communion titles
Preceded by Nathaniel Alexander	Bishop of Meath; 1840–1842	Succeeded by Edward Stopford
