= Swastika Laundry =

Irish laundry company (1912–1987)

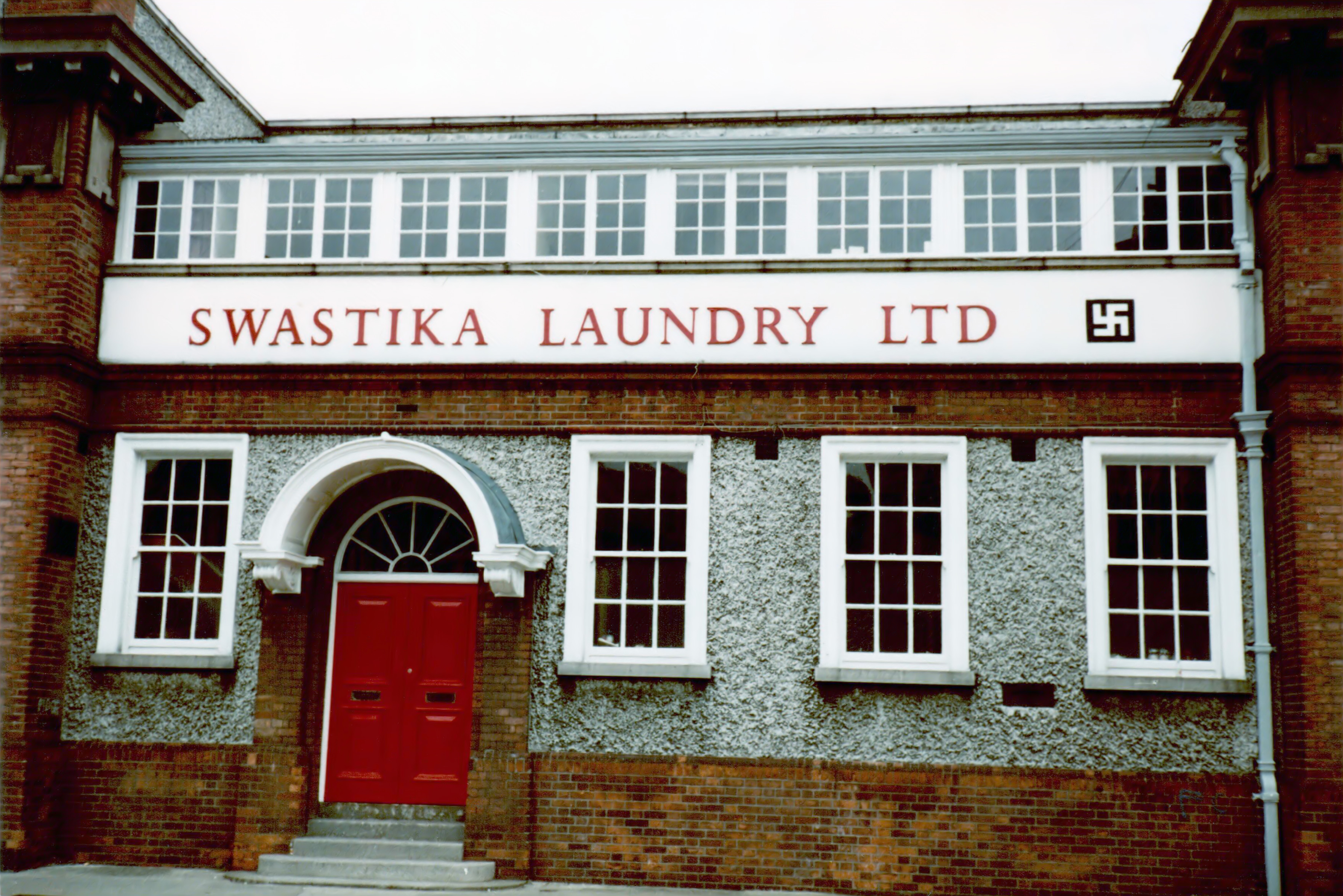
Swastika Laundry, main entrance, in 1981.

The Swastika Laundry was an Irish business founded in 1912, located on Shelbourne Road, Ballsbridge, a district of Dublin. Due to its name and logo being associated with the Nazi Party in Germany, the name was changed in 1939 but their logo endured.

== History ==
The laundry was founded by John W. Brittain (1872–1937) from Manorhamilton, County Leitrim, who was one of the "pioneers of the laundry business in Ireland", having founded the Metropolitan and White Heather Laundries in 1899. He was also the owner of a famous horse called Swastika Rose which was well known "to frequenters of the Royal Dublin's Society's Shows". The use of the Swastika name was as an ancient Indian symbol of good luck: its name originates from the Sanskrit svastika.

In 1939, the laundry changed its name to "The Swastika Laundry (1912)" to make clear the distinction between its use of the name and symbol and the more recent adoption of the symbol by the Nazi Party in Germany.

A new laundry building was built to the design of Frederick Hayes in 1912.

The company used electric vans, painted in red with a white swastika on a black roundel, to collect and deliver laundry to customers. The vans were quite ahead of their time.

It continued to exist as a separate company until the late 1960s, when it was bought out by the Spring Grove Laundry company, which continued to operate from the same site in Ballsbridge until selling the site in the early 21st century. The logo and name continued in use until the late 1980's, when it became rebranded as Spring Grove Services.

== Later history of site ==
Even following the closure of the laundry, its brick chimney, emblazoned with a large white swastika, remained visible for some years from many places in the surrounding area, including the Merrion Road, a main road south from Dublin.

Spring Grove sold the property for redevelopment in the early 21st century during the Dublin property boom of the 1990s and 2000s, as Ballsbridge was by then a popular and exclusive area of Dublin 4. An office development called "The Oval" was constructed on the site. The chimney, which is a protected structure, survives, but the painted swastika does not. The chimney is surrounded by the "oval" of the new development.

== Cultural references ==
In his Irisches Tagebuch (Irish Journal) (1957), the future Nobel Laureate, Heinrich Böll, writes about a year spent living in the west of Ireland in the 1950s. While in Dublin, before heading to County Mayo, he:

... was almost run over by a bright-red panel truck whose sole decoration was a big swastika. Had someone sold Völkischer Beobachter delivery trucks here, or did the Völkischer Beobachter still have a branch office here? This one looked exactly like those I remembered; but the driver crossed himself as he smilingly signalled to me to proceed, and on closer inspection I saw what had happened. It was simply the "Swastika Laundry," which had painted the year of its founding, 1912, clearly beneath the swastika; but the mere possibility that it might have been one of those others was enough to take my breath away.

== See also ==
- Western use of the swastika in the early 20th century
- Lamplight Laundry
