= Magdalen Society of Philadelphia =

The Magdalen Society of Philadelphia was a private charitable organization founded in 1800 to redeem prostitutes and other "fallen women". The society was the first association in the United States that sought to rescue and reform wayward women. Several local clergymen and citizens affiliated with Quaker, Episcopal and Presbyterian denominations met to form the society. Bishop William White, the nation's highest-ranking Episcopal bishop, was the first president of the society, which incorporated in 1802. The organization was based on Magdalen hospitals in England and Ireland, which were named for Mary Magdalene. Similar organizations were soon started in other American cities in the early 19th century.

== Background ==
The Magdalen Society of Philadelphia, a private charitable organization, was founded in 1807. The stated purpose of Philadelphia's Magdalen Society was "restoring to the paths of virtue those unhappy females who in unguarded hours have been robbed of their innocence." The president of the Society was Bishop William White, rector of Christ Church; the vice-president was Robert Wharton, mayor of Philadelphia.

While many women's societies existed then, The Magdalen Society stood out in believing that "fallen" women could be rehabilitated and returned to society to live successful lives. One such woman was Elizabeth Ogden. After her stay at The Magdalen Society, Elizabeth went on to open a school. In other societies, women followed this same path, marrying into better families and finding new ways to contribute to society. Not every woman experienced a lifestyle change like Elizabeth, but if they wanted access to other options, the Magdalen Society was easy to access. This was especially important for those who turned to prostitution and other illegal means of living because they had no other choice.

In 1808, the society opened the Magdalen Asylum on the northeast corner of Schuylkill Second (now 21st) and Race Streets, at 39.958°N 75.174°W. The Society's Board of Managers operated it and initially housed about a dozen prostitutes and other errant women. The Magdalen Asylum stood on this site for over a century until 1916. Starting in 1988, an archeological investigation of the site was conducted in connection with the construction of the Franklin Institute's Futures Center, which now overlaps the site.

== Operation ==
The women that the asylum admitted were called Magdalens and were assigned a number in the order they entered the facility. They were mostly young immigrant women between the ages of 17 and 23 who were on their own and unsupported. They generally did not share the Magdalen Society's image of their "guilt and wretchedness" but instead sought a sanctuary from disease, the prison or almshouse, unhappy family situations, abusive men, and dire economic circumstances.

In its early years, the Magdalen Society Asylum functioned as a refuge for prostitutes. Most of these stayed only a few days or weeks. In 1877, the asylum was changed into a home for wayward girls, with a rule requiring a twelve-month stay. As the Magdalen Society Asylum became more selective, relaxed its emphasis on personal guilt and salvation, and standardized the treatment of the inmates in some respects, its rate of failure diminished.

In the 1840s, the society erected a much larger Magdalen Home in the same locality. This building separated the inmates ("magdalens") from the staff, and recalcitrant inmates from new arrivals. Fences and eventually a 13-foot wall were built around the property to keep the magdalens from seeing or otherwise interacting with the encroaching city.

The Philadelphia Magdalen Society lodged 2,726 women, attempting to change them into domestic servants, factory workers, seamstresses, or laundresses—and sometimes even returning the inmates to their families, hopefully with a more "proper" mindset. Still, even the Board of Managers conceded that few magdalens were converted to lives of virtue. So the society began to focus on preventing waywardness and providing education to girls.

The Home for Magdalens moved to Montgomery County, Pennsylvania, in 1915, when it became clear that the refuge had outlived its usefulness. Other private organizations and state institutions had become concerned with the treatment of "delinquent" girls, and the asylum's functions had been taken over by city courts, which placed youthful offenders on probation rather than committing them to institutions.

== White-Williams Foundation for Girls ==
The society began to seek a new direction for its work. It wanted to find ways to prevent the delinquency it had worked to treat for over a hundred years. The Board of Managers voted to address the heart of the problem by providing direction and assistance to steer children away from trouble. Accordingly, the Magdalen Society changed its name to White-Williams Foundation for Girls in 1918. (The name honored Bishop William White and George Williams, a Quaker philanthropist and former Board chairman.) White-Williams began the service that it continues today: providing stipends to needy Philadelphia students. White-Williams Scholars visit area colleges, attend cultural events and career exploration workshops, and participate in peer support groups. Now known as White-Williams Scholars, the organization currently serves both male and female pupils in Philadelphia public high schools.

== See also ==
- White-Williams Scholars
