= Cadwallader Wolseley =

Irish Anglican priest (1806–1872)

Cadwallader Wolseley (12 February 1806 – 4 November 1872) was an Irish Anglican priest, Archdeacon of Glendalough from 1862 until his death.

Wolseley was educated at Trinity College, Dublin. From 1833 until 1853, he was Chaplain of Kirwan House, the Church of Ireland, Female Orphan House in Dublin;, and also chaplain to the Pleasants' Female Orphan Asylum, Camden Street, Dublin and later held the living at St Andrew, Lucan.
