= Hercules Dickinson =

Irish Anglican priest and theologian (1827–1905)

Hercules Henry Dickinson (b & d Dublin, 14 September 1827 – 17 May 1905) was an Irish Anglican priest and theologian.

Dickinson was born in Dublin the son of Charles Dickinson, a vicar and later bishop of Meath (1840–42), by Elizabeth Dickinson (née Russell). He was educated at Trinity College, Dublin (TCD), where he graduated BA in 1850, and was ordained deacon in 1851 and priest a year later. He was curate of St Ann, Dublin until 1855 and vicar from then until 1902. In 1865 he became sub-dean of the Chapel Royal, Dublin, and in 1868 its dean. He was also chaplain to the lord lieutenant. Dickinson was treasurer of St Patrick's Cathedral, Dublin from 1869 to 1876 and precentor from 1876 to 1902. In 1894 he became professor of pastoral theology at TCD, from where he had received the degree Doctor of Divinity (DD) in 1866. He retired in 1902.

He died at his home in Baldonnel, Co. Dublin, 17 May 1905, and is buried at Mount Jerome cemetery.

Dickinson married 2 October 1867 Mary Kennedy of Belgard, Co. Dublin, daughter of Dr Evory Kennedy, an obstetrician and President of the Royal College of Physicians of Ireland. They had nine children, including:

- Frank Dickison, an officer in the British Army serving in South Africa; who married in Boshof 5 January 1903 Mildred Marais, of Boshof.
