= Thomas Caffrey =

Irish businessman

- Born: Thomas Andrew Caffrey; 12 September 1917; Dublin, Ireland
- Died: 17 May 2010 (aged 92)
- Other name: Willy Wonka
- Occupation: Chocolatier
- Known for: His chocolate treats

Thomas Andrew Caffrey (12 September 1917 – 17 May 2010) was an Irish chocolatier and founder of Caffrey's Confectionery, which today sells products in Ireland, Europe, Australia and the United States and is the oldest remaining family-owned, family-named chocolate company in Ireland. He was considered "Ireland's answer to Willy Wonka", and was referred to as this when alive, having been credited with personally inventing treats such as the Macaroon bar, the Big Time bar and the Chocolate Snowball. Generations of Irish schoolchildren recognised these products, according to The Irish Times, while his imagination was inspired by his son's frolics with his wind-up toy and led to him creating the Marshmallow Mice.

Caffrey was born in Dublin on 12 September 1917. During summers as a little boy he worked in the chocolate factory managed by his brother, William, on the Isle of Man. Caffrey's Confectionery commenced business in Harold's Cross, Dublin in 1930 before moving to Walkinstown. Caffrey received a contract with the UK retailer Woolworths in the 1950s. In 1953 he provided confectionery for the coronation of Elizabeth II in the UK. Fundamental to his success was the fair treatment of his staff. Caffrey remained with his company until he was in his seventies.

Caffrey was also interested in horticulture, skipping, reading and rugby union, supporting both Leinster and the Ireland national rugby union team. He ate chocolate daily, favouring his own Snowball invention above any other. His wife Eileen died before him; he died at the age of 92 on 17 May 2010. The Irish Post reacted to Caffrey's death with the headline "the end of an era" and by calling him "one of Ireland's finest heroes" and "the country's leading chocolatier, having created the delights of the Snowball, the Chocolate Mallow, the Tea Cake and Mint Crisp bars amongst many others". Caffrey's Confectionery was still in business at its Walkinstown base when he died.
