= Foundling Hospital, Dublin =

Former institution for abandoned children

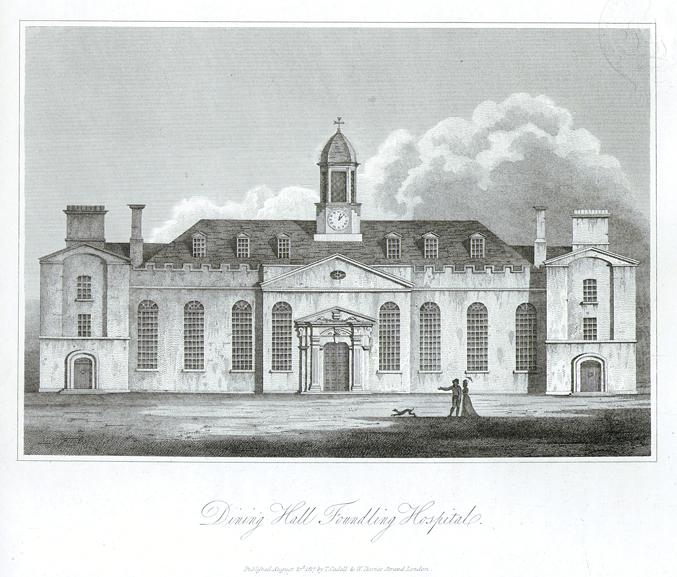
- "Dining Hall, Foundling Hospital", Dublin.

- Shown in Dublin

Geography
- Location: Dublin, Ireland
- Coordinates: 53.3420°N 6.2958°W

History
- Founded: 1704
- Closed: 1835

Dublin Foundling Hospital Act 1798
- Act of Parliament
- Parliament of Ireland
- Long title: An Act to authorise the issuing and payment of the sum of £5,000, granted as a further supply for the foundling hospital and workhouse in the city of Dublin.
- Citation: 38 Geo. 3. c. 64 (I)
- Territorial extent: Ireland

Dates
- Royal assent: 6 October 1798
- Commencement: 6 October 1798
- Repealed: 3 July 1879

Other legislation
- Repealed by: Statute Law Revision (Ireland) Act 1879

Status: Repealed

The Foundling Hospital was an institution for abandoned children in Dublin, Ireland which was established in 1730.

== History ==
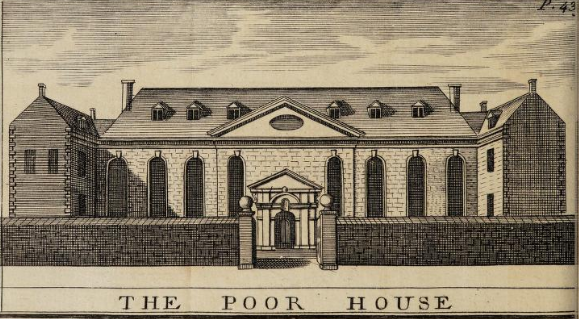
An image of the hospital taken from Charles Brooking's map of Dublin (1728).

The Foundling Hospital, Dublin was located in the Workhouse. The Workhouse had been established in 1704 and was likely designed by Thomas Burgh. The front doorcase was in the manner of Michelangelo's Porta Pia in Rome. Between 1798 and 1804, Francis Johnston was involved in designing new structures on the site including a chapel and infirmary as well as embellishing the front with a castellated parapet and cupola.

In 1730, the Foundling Hospital's first year of operation, 263 abandoned infants were admitted. The numbers increased rapidly and by the third year admissions had grown to 533.

Firmly established by the mid-18th century, the Foundling Hospital had steadily become a large "baby farming" institution. Two primary objectives of the hospital were to avoid deaths and murders of illegitimate children and to teach the Protestant faith to these children.

No inquiry was made about the parents, and no money was received. A cradle was installed by 1730. Between 1,500 and 2,000 children were received annually. A large income was derived from a duty on coal. In 1822 an admission fee of £5 was charged on the parish from which the child came. This reduced the annual arrivals to about 500.

Child deaths during transport to the hospital or whilst staying in the hospital were not infrequent and would often become the subject of an inquiry. The number of Protestant nurses was usually inadequate with the resulting use of Roman Catholic nurses and occasional consequence of "religious error".

Between 1796 and 1826, 51,150 infants were admitted to the hospital, of whom 41,524 died. In Samuel Watson's "The Gentleman's and Citizen's Almanack" for the year 1792, a table is presented detailing the number of children admitted to the hospital from June 1790 to June 1791, and what became of them. John Watson Stewart's "The Gentleman's and Citizen's Almanack" for the year 1830 noted the number of children onsite at that stage:

There were, on the 10th Oct. 1829, 1,077 CHILDREN in the House, who, when qualified, are apprenticed to qualified Masters; and nearly 4,600 with Nurses in the Country.

In 1829, the select committee on the Irish miscellaneous estimates recommended that no further assistance should be given. Only during the tenure of Lady Arabella Denny and later the other "Ladies Governesses" did the death rate and horrific conditions of the foundling hospital improve. However during its existence the hospital had not preserved life or educated the foundlings. The mortality was nearly 4 in 5, and the total cost climbed to almost £40,000 a year. Accordingly, in 1835 Lord Glenelg (then Irish Secretary) closed the institution.

The hospital was only demolished in the second half of the 20th century to be replaced with buildings within the St James's Hospital campus.

=== New National Children's Hospital ===
A new children's hospital has been proposed to move the National Children's Hospital from Tallaght University Hospital onto the campus of St. James's Hospital.

Former senator, John Gilroy, said that given the presence of the foundling hospital on the site and the very high death rate, there was a possibility that children might have been buried there. However extensive investigation including the environmental impact study and the site excavation works found no evidence of any graves on the site.

== See also ==
- Foundling hospital
- House of Industry (Dublin)

== Sources ==
- Watson Stewart, John (1830). Watson's, or the Gentleman's and Citizen's Almanack, (as Compiled by the late John Watson Stewart,) For the Year of our Lord 1830 (PDF). Dublin: Stewart and Hopes, Stationers, No 3, King's-Inns-Quay, opposite Richmond Bridge.
