= Harold's Cross =

Suburb of Dublin, Ireland

Harold's Cross Irish: Cros Araild
- Inner suburb
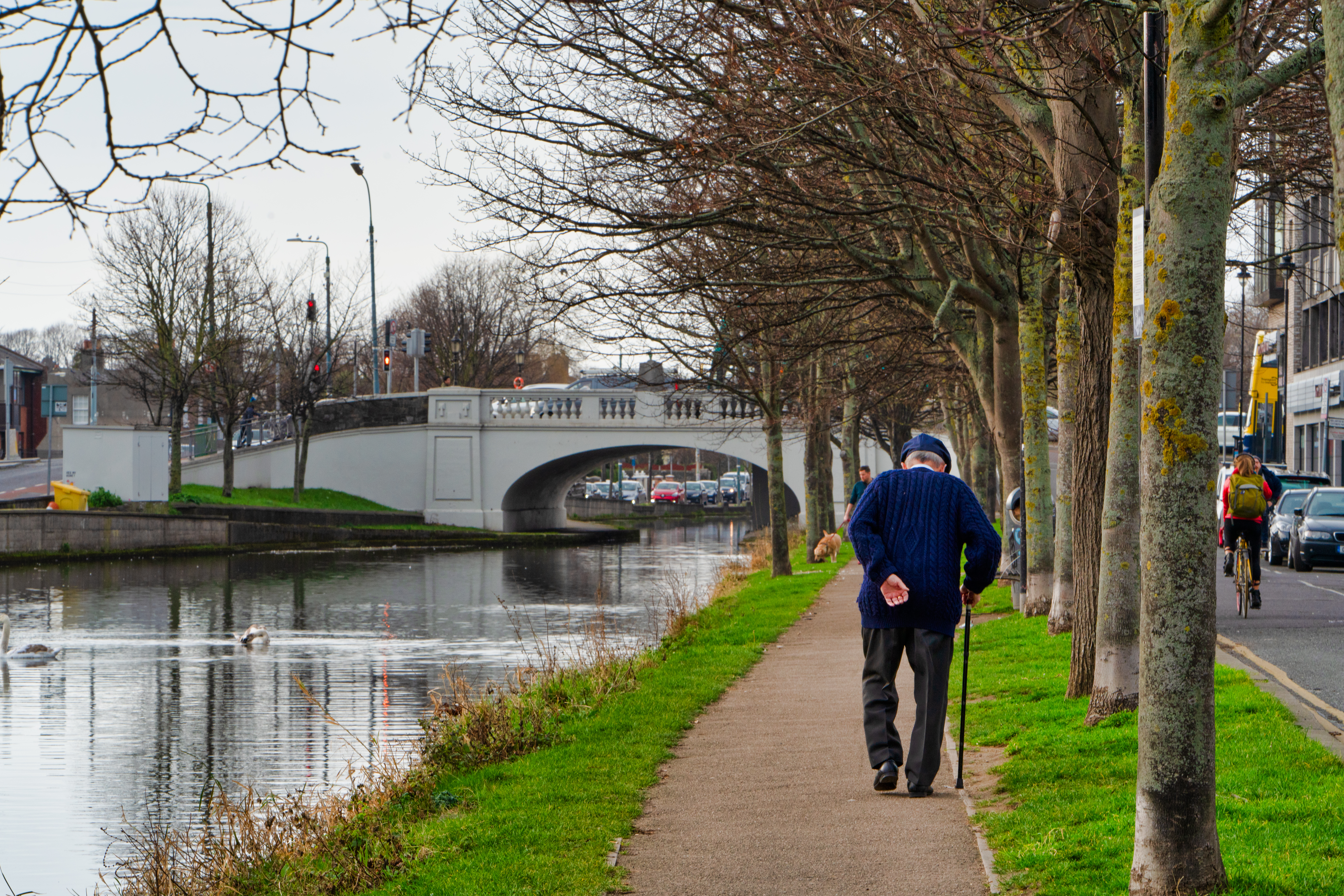
- Robert Emmet Bridge as seen from the banks of the Grand Canal, Harold's Cross

- Location within Ireland
- Coordinates: 53°19′35″N 6°17′41″W
- Country: Ireland
- Province: Leinster
- County: Dublin
- Local authority: Dublin City Council
- Established: 12th Century
- Eircode routing key: D06, D6W, D12

Harold's Cross (Irish: Cros Araild, meaning 'Harold's Cross') is an affluent urban village and inner suburb on the south side of Dublin, Ireland. The River Poddle runs through it, though largely in an underground culvert, and it holds a major cemetery, Mount Jerome, and Our Lady's Hospice.

== Geography ==
=== Location ===
Harold's Cross is situated north of Terenure and Rathgar, west of Rathmines, east of Crumlin and Kimmage, and directly south from the Grand Canal at Clanbrassil Street. It lies within the jurisdiction of Dublin City Council, and straddles the boundary of Dublin 6, Dublin 6W and Dublin 12 postal districts.

=== The Poddle ===
The River Poddle runs south to north through the area. At the southern end of the district, the river's course splits at the centuries-old "Tongue" or "Stone Boat" with part of its flow diverted underground into the "City Watercourse" culvert, while the mainline continues overground, passing through ponds. The Poddle goes underground between Mount Argus and Mount Jerome, then flows along the cemetery boundary, including the Islamic plot, before going into a culvert at Greenmount, heading for the Grand Canal.

== Name ==
There are a number of competing explanations for the name of Harold's Cross, which has been extant for a very long time, at least several centuries, and indeed whether there was an eponymous Harold, or whether the name referred to a class or group of "Haralds," or where precisely and what form the “Cross” took. Debating the question is considered a good way to start an argument in the area, since there is no clear or contemporaneously recorded answer, with many authoritatively and insistently stated, albeit significantly different explanations since the 19th century, with at least some tenuous justification to each. An aspect of the name theories is that Harold's Cross lies on the ancient Slíghe Chualann, a major South to North route and one of the ‘Five Great Roads’ of medieval Ireland and a key southern entry point into Dublin City via Clanbrassil Street.

One explanation of the origin of the name is that it is derived from the name given to a gallows, which had been placed where the Harold's Cross Park is now situated; however, gallows in medieval times were primarily used to support weighing scales for markets and toll/tax collection and less for executions (see the discussion below.) It is the case that Harold's Cross was an execution ground for the city of Dublin up to the 18th century, but it also was a key entry point to the greater city where tolls might have been collected. In the 14th century a gallows there was maintained by the Archbishop.

Another explanation is that Harold's Cross stands on lands which formed, like those of Rathmines, part of the Manor of St. Sepulchre, and its name is said to have originated in a cross which marked the boundary of the lands of the Archbishop of Dublin, and warned the Harolds (or Haralds/Harrals/Harrels), the wild guardians of the border of the Pale near Whitechurch that they must not encroach beyond that point. The De Meones family, who gave their name to Rathmines, also owned lands at Harold's Cross in the fourteenth century.

Yet another explanation is that it is derived from a stone cross that marked the boundary of lands held by the Danish Viking Harold family of Rathfarnham in early medieval times, reputedly located at what is now the five-road Kenilworth junction on Harold's Cross Road.

A variation on these explanations is derived from the traditional use of gallows as public weighing scales (and not just a means of public execution) and suggests that the cross was used to weigh certain goods entering or exiting the city of Dublin by this boundary, so as to charge a tax or tariff, or that a fee was charged by weight for goods crossing a ford over one of the watercourses that predated the Grand Canal by one or more of the families, groups or individuals described as controlling the area above, or alternatively that the cross[ing] was that ford over the river Poddle.

== History ==
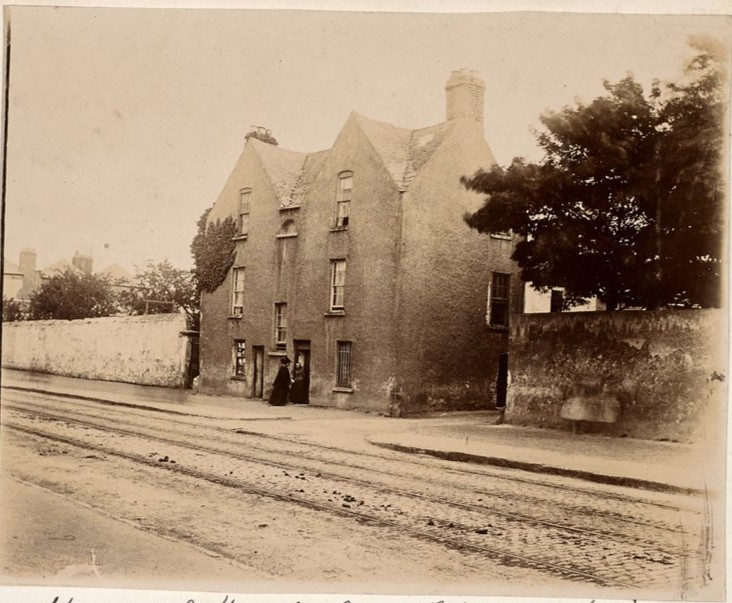
Houses at the junction of Harold's Cross Road and Mount Drummond Avenue circa 1893.

Harold's Cross lies on the medieval Slíghe Chualann, of the Five great roads of Ireland, and thus would have been an important entry point into Dublin from the South. Much of the local industry during the 19th century revolved around the old mills which were located on the River Poddle and associated channels. A paper mill was located at Mount Argus where there was a small rural village at that time, and also a flour mill was near what are now the gates of Mount Jerome cemetery. During the 20th century the old mill at Mount Argus, disused at this stage, was adopted by the local Scout Troop the 45th Mount Argus as a boxing club, as a result of which the troop became commonly known as "the fighting 45th" troop in Dublin Scouting circles. The troop was founded by Rev. Fr. Cronin C.P. of Mount Argus church.

Harold's Cross Green was a key meeting point for members of the Society of United Irishmen just before the 1798 Rebellion, rebels such as Thomas Cloney and Myles Byrne meet the commander Robert Emmet to discuss tactics for the pending uprising.

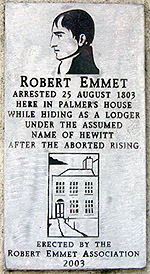
Plaque to Robert Emmet on Harold's Cross Road.

Irish Nationalist leader Robert Emmet was captured near Harold's Cross. He lived for a period in a house in Harold's Cross so he could be near his sweetheart Sarah Curran of Rathfarnham. He led an abortive rebellion against British rule in 1803 and was captured, tried and executed. The Grand Canal bridge linking Harold's Cross Road and Clanbrassil Street was named in his honour and a plaque there commemorates him (the bridge was formerly called Clanbrassil Bridge, and is known locally as Harold's Cross Bridge).

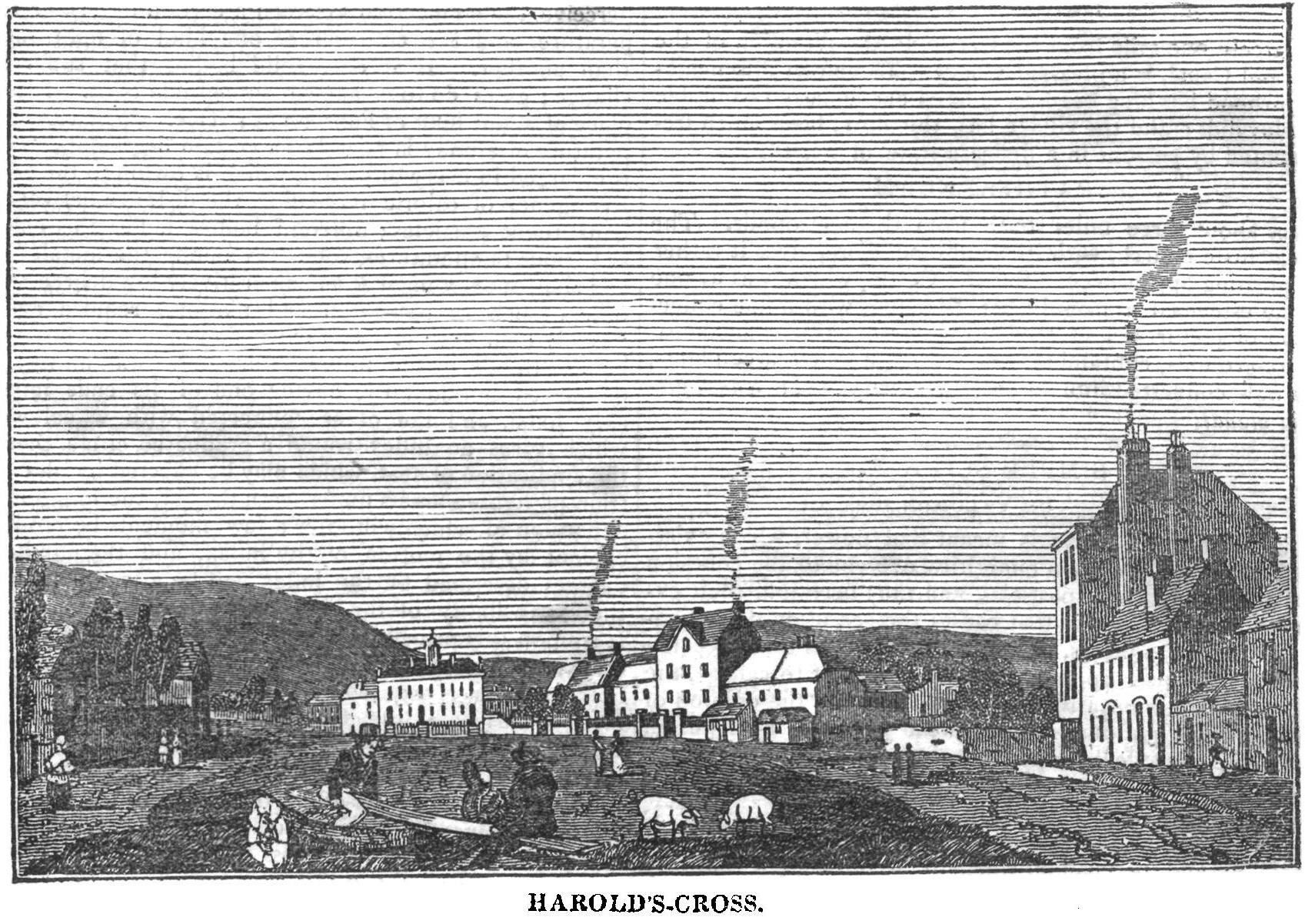
Harold's Cross, Dublin Penny Journal 1835

The population at the time of the 1841 census was 2,789 inhabitants.

The father of Patrick Pearse (Pádraic Mac Piarais), James, was a stonemason for Mount Argus Church. The Pearse family had a long association with the Passionists and Mount Argus. Both Patrick and Willie Pearse came for confessions on the day of the Easter Rising. Mrs Pearse and Patrick himself also taught Irish language lessons in the community Scout Hall next to the church. The 1916 Volunteers, who had a training ground in nearby Kimmage, are said to have paid a visit to Mount Argus Church to pray just before taking part in the 1916 Easter Rising.

O'Connor's Jewellers on Harold's Cross Road was the location of one of two robberies carried out by the notorious Dublin criminal Martin Cahill in the 1980s. Cahill, also known as "The General", is buried in Mount Jerome Cemetery.

Honour Bright, a prostitute (real name Elizabeth (Lily) O'Neill) was murdered in June 1925, and her body found in the mountains. Witnesses last saw her alive at Leonards' Corner, just to the north of Harolds' Cross. Dr Patrick Purcell, a medical doctor in County Wicklow, and Leopold J. Dillon, a Garda, were put on trial charged with the murder but were acquitted. The murderer was never traced.

There was a well-established community of Quakers in Harold's Cross that operated a number of industries in the locality including cotton, paper and flour milling during the 19th century. They also ran a number of orphanages locally. Among these industries was the Greenmount Spinning manufacturing powered by the River Poddle, owned by the Pim family. James Pim was commonly known as the "Quaker father of Irish railways.

Quaker brothers Thomas Pim and Robert Goodbody decided to relocate Goodbody Tobacco manufacturing to Greenville near Harolds Cross after a disastrous fire in their Tullamore premises in 1886; as a result, most of their employees were also relocated to the area, where red brick terrace housing was built in the area by the Dublin Artizans' Dwellings Company, in which the Pim family were prominent members.

== Amenities and features ==
Harold's Cross has a number of pubs, shops, cafes, an active credit union, and other businesses.

Harold's Cross Park, a small and well-maintained city park, occupies the site of the original village green and contains a playground, water feature and coffee kiosk.

Historically a number of large houses were constructed, mostly with the appendage of ‘Mount’ to reflect the parish's elevation, and their names are remembered today but no longer as houses: Mount Argus (church and monastery), Mount Jerome (cemetery), Greenmount House (the Hospice), Mount Harold (the Catholic Church) and Mount Drummond and Mount Tallant (housing developments).

The memorial cross at Harold's Cross Park was sculpted by local sculptor and stonemason Joseph Courtney and isn't the eponymous ‘Cross;’ the name of Harold's Cross long predating it (at least that explanation for the area's name is definitely incorrect! See the discussion above)

In 1804 the sisters of the order of St. Clare moved to the village to run a female orphanage (named after San Damiano), founded the previous year. This is now the Saint Clare's Convent and Primary School, and is the oldest Catholic school in the Archdiocese of Dublin. Beside the convent is the national headquarters for the Secular Franciscan Order.

=== Mount Jerome Cemetery ===
At one side of Harold's Cross is Mount Jerome Cemetery, as mentioned in Joyce's Ulysses, originally one of the residences of an extensive family named Shaw. It is considered Dublin's most gothic cemetery. People buried there include Thomas Davis, George Russell (AE), and Oscar Wilde's father, William Wilde, and mother, in addition to members of the Guinness family and deceased members of the Royal Irish Constabulary. The remains of French Huguenots once buried in St. Peter's Churchyard, Peter's Row (now the location of the Dublin YMCA), which was demolished in the 1980s, are interred here. Other graves include those of mathematician William Rowan Hamilton and playwright John Millington Synge. The cemetery was operated from 1837 to 1984 by a private company and now belongs to the Massey family.

The creation of the cemetery at Mount Jerome in 1836 by the Protestant Church of Ireland was to counteract the popularity of burials, even among people of their own fraternity at that time, for the new Glasnevin Cemetery opened in 1832. Initially Mount Jerome was an exclusively Protestant cemetery but was later opened up to Catholic burials. There is now also a distinct Islamic plot, to the right near the entrance.

=== Hospice ===
The suburb is also home to Dublin's first hospice, Our Lady's Hospice, Harold's Cross. This palliative care facility was founded in 1879 in a house called Our Lady's Mount (formerly Greenmount), which was previously the Mother House of the Religious Sisters of Charity. Mary Aikenhead, founder of the Sisters of Charity order, lived in Our Lady's Mount from 1845 onwards. She bought a large Georgian house at Greenmount from an abolitionist family called Webb who were members of the Society of Friends (Quakers), after she offered more than a rival bid from Mount Jerome cemetery. A new hospice building was commenced in 1886, and many more buildings followed.

== Transport ==
Harold's Cross is served by Dublin Bus route 16, 82, F1, F2, F3 and S2.

== Religion ==
The area holds Our Lady of the Rosary Roman Catholic parish church, Mount Argus Monastery and church, Saint Clare's Convent and primary school, and the base of Dublin's Russian Orthodox community.

Mount Argus was the official home of Saint Charles of Mount Argus who was a well known Passionist priest in 19th-century Ireland, mentioned as a miracle worker in the book Ulysses, Circe chapter. It also has long-established links with the Garda Síochána and it was officially the church of the Dublin Metropolitan Police. The first Rector of Mount Argus was Fr. Paul Mary Pakenham who was the son of the Earl of Longford and nephew of Kitty Pakenham (Duchess of Wellington). His first mass took place in a house at the time on 15 August 1856. Irish architect J.J. McCarthy was commissioned to design the new monastery.

The Roman Catholic parish church is the Church of the Holy Rosary. The parish is an active one with many contributing to its attendant organisations. The church was built on top of the remains of an old stately house called Mount Harold House at the end of the 19th century. Original floor tiles of the house can still be seen on the chapel floor to this day.

The former Church of Ireland parish church in Harold's Cross, overlooking the Poddle and Mount Jerome Cemetery to the rear, is leased to the Moscow Patriarchate of the Russian Orthodox Church and operates as the Church of Ss Peter and Paul. A substantial congregation, made up of Orthodox immigrants to Ireland (mostly from the former Soviet Union, Eastern Slovakia, the Baltic States and Poland) along with native (mostly convert) Irish Orthodox attend services here. Services are conducted both in Church Slavonic and English with a smattering of Irish, and the iconostasis includes St. Patrick and St. Brigid. Below the church are community rooms.

== Education ==
Harold's Cross is served by a number of primary and secondary schools.

Primary schools in the area include Harold's Cross National School, Saint Clare's Primary School, Scoil Mológa (a Gaelscoil) and Harold's Cross Educate Together National School.

Harold's Cross has a single secondary school, Harold's Cross ETSS (Educate Together Secondary School), and is served by a variety of other schools in the immediate area.

== People ==
- Richard Allen (abolitionist) (1803–1886), born at No. 201 Harold's Cross Road, a large red brick building dating from 1750; he was a well known Quaker.
- Thomas Caffrey (1917–2010), Irish chocolatier started his first venture by opening a business in Harold's Cross, Dublin in 1930
- Brian D'Arcy born 1945, is a Passionist priest who resided and preached in the Mount Argus Monastery.
- John Charles D'Arcy, father of the Church of Ireland clergyman Charles D'Arcy, had a family home in the Mount Tallant area of Harold's Cross.
- Father Cuthbert Dunne C.P., (1869–1950), was a Passionist priest from Mount Argus, who carried out the deathbed conversion of Oscar Wilde to the Catholic faith in Paris.
- John Jordan, poet and author of Patrician Stations, A Raft from Flotsam and Selected Poems (ed. Hugh McFadden), academic and broadcaster, 1930–1988, lived in Park View Avenue, Harolds Cross.
- John Keogh (1740–1817) was a leading Irish campaigner who struggled to get Irish Roman Catholics the right to vote and the repeal of the Penal Laws. He lived in a large mansion in the Mount Jerome area of Harold's Cross which was often visited by leading members of the Society of United Irishmen. He died in 1817 and was buried in St. Kevin's Church, Camden Row, where his grave can be seen.
- Adam Loftus (1533–1605), Archbishop of Dublin during the Middle Ages owned land in the Mount Jerome area west of the borough.
- Hugh McFadden, poet and author of Pieces of Time, Elegies & Epiphanies and Empire of Shadows, has lived in Harolds Cross.
- Gerald Molloy (1834–1906) born at Mount Tallant House, was an Irish Roman Catholic priest, theologian and scientist. He served as a member of the first senate of the Royal University of Ireland
- John Moore (Bishop of Bauchi) (1942–2010), born in Harold's Cross, ordained as the first bishop of the Roman Catholic Diocese of Bauchi, Nigeria
- Richard Moynan (1856–1906), was an Irish painter and unionist propagandist who had his studio based in Harold's Cross.
- Joseph "Spud" Murphy, (1923–2001), who invented the "Cheese & Onion" crisp, set up his Tayto crisp production plant in Mount Tallant in the 1960s
- Edward O'Reilly (1765–1830) was an Irish scholar in the first half of the 19th century.
- Leo Rowsome (1903–1970), born in Harold's Cross, was the third generation of an unbroken line of uilleann pipers. He also manufactured and taught the uilleann pipes
- Robert Shaw (1774–1849), a member of the Shaw family of Bushy Park and an Irish Tory, UK Member of Parliament, inherited the ownership of the Mount Jerome estate by marrying the daughter of a Dublin merchant and previous owner, Abraham Wilkinson. Shaw later leased it to John Keogh.
- James Spratt R.N. (1771–1853), fought in the Battle of Trafalgar in 1805. His birthplace is recorded as "Harrel's Cross" County Dublin.
- Niall Tóibín (1929–2019), was an Irish comedian and actor. He lived in a house with his family just off Kimmage road Lower near Mount Argus Church.
- Isaac Weld (1774–1856), was an Irish topographical writer, explorer, and artist, he was part of the Weld family, the Irish descendants of the family were also residents at the mansion at Mount Jerome.

== Sport ==
Harold's Cross Stadium was one of two main greyhound racing stadia in Dublin, the other being Shelbourne Park in Ringsend. It was owned and operated by the Irish Greyhound Board. It closed in February 2017 due to a need to repay debts arising from a major development in Limerick.

Shelbourne FC, the League of Ireland side, played at the Harold's Cross greyhound stadium during the period 1975-77 and again from 1983 to 1989 before moving to the refurbished home ground of Tolka Park. St Patrick's Athletic also played at the greyhound stadium from 1989/90 up to November 1993, while work was being done to its Richmond Park home.

== See also ==
- List of towns and villages in Ireland
- Curtis, Joe (2004). Harolds Cross (3 ed.). Dublin: Free Return Press. ISBN 0953332055. OL 31916599M.
- "Harold's Cross, A History" (2016), by local historian, Joe Curtis.
- "Harold's Cross in Old Photographs" (2011), by local historian, Joe Curtis.
