= Shelbourne Road =

Road in Dublin, Ireland

- Location within Dublin
- Native name: Bóthar Shíol Bhroin (Irish)
- Former names: Artichoke Road; Beggar's Bush Road
- Namesake: William Petty, 2nd Earl of Shelburne
- Length: 900 m (3,000 ft)
- Width: 19 metres (62 ft)
- Location: Ballsbridge, Dublin, Ireland
- Postal code: D04
- Coordinates: 53.33401°N 6.231969°W
- north end: Merrion Road
- south end: Bath Avenue; Haddington Road; Grand Canal Street Upper

Shelbourne Road (Irish: Bóthar Shíol Bhroin) is a road in Ballsbridge, in the southeast part of Dublin, Ireland.

== History ==
The road is named for William Petty, 2nd Earl of Shelburne, Marquess of Lansdowne, second Earl of Shelburne who was born in Dublin and was Prime Minister from 1782 to 1783.

In John Rocque's map of 1756, today's Shelbourne Road and Upper Grand Canal Street, from which it extends, appear together as Beggars' Bush Road. Wilson's Plan of 1793 shows that Beggars' Bush Road has become known as Artichoke Road. Some sources attribute this change of name to John Villiboise, a French Huguenot, who had obtained a 99-year lease on 1 rood of land from Richard 5th Viscount Fitzwilliam in 1736 (Note: Registry of Deeds, Dublin. Memorial: 82-480-58668. Registered 04/06/1736. A Memorial of an Indenture of Lease bearing date the eighth day of May one thousand seven hundred and thirty six made between the Rt. Honble Richard Lord Viscount Fitz Williams of Merryon of the one part and John Villebois of the City of Dublin, Merchant, of the other part Whereby the said Richard Lord Viscount Fitz Williams did for the considerations therein mentioned Demise and set unto the said John Villebois all that and those the messuage or tenement with the appurtenances commonly called the Pot Yard together with the piece or plot of ground & garden behind the same containing in the whole one rood of ground be the same more or less [..] To hold to John Villebois for the term of ninety and nine years at the yearly rent of three pounds five shillings sterling to be paid quarterly and two sugar loaves weighing ten pounds or five shillings sterling in lieu thereof. Which said Indenture of Lease is witnessed by James Coningham of London, Merchant, and Henry Jones of the same city, Gent.) and who planted artichokes on the land adjoining his house. This house, located in the vicinity of today's Holles Street, became known as Artichoke House and eventually the road became known as Artichoke Road. In William Duncan's map of 1821, the district known as Beggars' Bush is a rather ill-defined area that seems to coincide more or less with the area of land now occupied by Lansdowne Road's rugby stadium and the houses to its west. Later ordnance survey maps give the precise size and boundaries for Beggars Bush: it is an area of 116 acres, 2 roods and 21 perches bounded on the east by the Dodder from the bridge at Ballsbridge to the bridge at Ringsend; on the north by Ringsend Road from Ringsend bridge to South Lotts Road; on the south-west by South Lotts Road to Beggars Bush Road (Shelbourne Road); from Shelbourne Road to Lansdowne Road; the boundary then runs south-west on Lansdowne Road alongside Trinity College's botanical gardens and turns south on Pembroke Road to join the bridge at Ballsbridge. By 1827 the road was then commonly known by the names of both 'the Artichoke' and 'the Beggars Bush road'. (Note: Registry of Deeds, Dublin. Memorial: 827-290-556425 (Extract). Registered 31/08/1827. A Memorial of an Indented Deed of Release made the twenty eighth day of March in [..] the year one thousand eight hundred and twenty seven, between The Right Honorable George Augustus Earl of Pembroke and Montgomery of the one part and The Principal Officers of His Majesty’s Ordnance of the other part [..] assigns, All that and those that piece or parcel of Land at Beggars Bush being part of the Lands of Baggotrath alias Baggotsrath in the County of the City of Dublin containing Six acres two roods and Eighteen perches of Land Irish Plantation Measure bounded on the North by the Road called and known by the name of the Circular Road, on the South by other parts of said Lands of Baggotsrath in the possession of the said George Augustus Earl of Pembroke and Montgomery or his undertenants, on the East by the road leading to Balls Bridge commonly called and known by the name of the Artichoke or Beggars Bush road and on the West by other parts of said Lands of Baggotsrath...) Old street directories show that the name Artichoke Road was still in use in the 1860s, but that the numbering of houses ran in the opposite direction from that currently employed - for example, No. 2 Artichoke Road corresponds to No. 68 Shelbourne Road; No. 3 Artichoke Road corresponds to No. 66 Shelbourne Road, and so on.

== Location ==
Shelbourne Road runs south-east from Haddington Road and skirts the site of the former Beggars Bush Barracks. It crosses Lansdowne Road just west of the famous international rugby union and football grounds. From there, it runs southwest to Merrion Road which it meets at the River Dodder bridge.

Early maps seem to indicate that the route of today's Shelbourne Road was determined by the borders of the marshy Dodder estuary which, also fed by the Swan River (now culverted), and subject to tidal flooding, extended almost as far west as the site of the Beggars' Bush Barracks. Although reclamation of the area can be said to have started with the construction of Sir John Rogerson's Quay in 1713, it wasn't until William Vavasour took a 150-year lease at £80 per annum on an area of sixty acres of marshland between Beggars' Bush and Ringsend in 1792 that the area began to take on the appearance we recognise today. According to The Dublin Chronicle, ...This tract, which is every tide inundated by the tide and Dodder, the taker, it is said, intends immediately to reclaim by a complete double embankment of the Dodder, which, thus confined to a determined channel, will then form a handsome canal through it; a circumstance that will not only ornament an unsightly spot, but materially improve the salubrity of the air at Irishtown, Ring-send, &c”.. Although further drainage works were undertaken in the 1830s to facilitate the construction of the Dublin and Kingstown Railway line, oyster and mussel shells frequently unearthed today during building and renovation works in houses along the road continue to provide reminders of the sea's recent presence.

== James Joyce ==
In 1904, James Joyce rented the front upstairs room of No. 60 Shelbourne Road from a family called McKernan for a short period. It was from this house that, on 16 June 1904, he set out for a rendezvous with Nora Barnacle, later to be his wife. He commemorated this date by choosing it as the day on which the action of his novel, Ulysses, takes place. The 16 June is now frequently referred to as 'Bloomsday'.

Farrington, the protagonist of Joyce's short story, Counterparts, alighted from a tram at Shelbourne Road and he steered his great body along in the shadows of the wall of the barracks as he made his way home, possibly to No. 60 Shelbourne Road.

== Botanic Gardens ==
On the site now occupied by the Berkeley Court and Jurys hotels stood Trinity College's Botanic Gardens. In 2005, this seven-acre plot of land was purchased for €379 million, making this corner of Shelbourne Road perhaps the most expensive real estate in Europe. Plans to re-develop it have faltered.

== Richard Turner ==
Richard Turner built his foundry, Hammersmith Ironworks, in 1834 on a six-acre site at the southern end of Shelbourne Road, immediately adjacent to Trinity College's Botanic Gardens.

Turner built houses, known as Turner's Cottages, at the side of his ironworks for his employees. These two-storey buildings, which were opposite today's Ballsbridge Motors, comprised an outer terrace on Shelbourne Road with an arc of terraced houses directly behind that. At the time of the 1901 census, there were 24 buildings. By the time of the 1911 census, two more cottages had, apparently, been added. Collectively, they were nicknamed The Gut, for reasons that are not exactly clear but probably because the inner part of the estate was built in an arc, resembling a human gut. They survived until the early 1970s.

== Swastika Laundry ==
The Swastika Laundry was a laundry founded in 1912, located on Shelbourne Road. They used electric vans, that were painted in red with a black swastika on a white background, to collect and deliver laundry to customers.

The use of Shelbourne Road and Lansdowne Road copies the name street crossings in Kenmare, County Kerry, the origin perhaps being that the Cromwellian army physician Sir William Petty also "moonlighted" as a part-time ordinance surveyor/cartographer.

== Shelbourne Football Club ==
Shelbourne Football Club, founded in 1895, was named as a result of the founders (who included James Rowan and 2 Wall brothers) tossed a coin under the Bath Avenue railway bridge to decide whether the name would be Bath FC or Shelbourne FC. The club originally played at St Marys Field close by, then at Shelbourne Park, and later moved to Ringsend("Pnuemonia Park") still terraced in the middle of a housing estate, followed by a short stay at Harolds Cross. Shelbourne FC now play on the northside of the city at Tolka Park.
