= J.P. Rodgers =

- Born: John Pascal Rodgers
- Occupation: Writer
- Mother: Bridie Rodgers

J.P. Rodgers, Irish writer, born Tuam, County Galway, c. 1947

John Pascal Rodgers was born to Bridie Rodgers (Magdalene Laundries, D.O.B 13 September 1927). She was an abandoned toddler who was picked up off the street at two and half years of age and charged with begging. She was found guilty and was sent to an Industrial school in Clifden, Co Galway, and ordered to be detained there until her sixteenth birthday. She was then sent to work in a big house where she was assaulted and fell pregnant. She was sent to a mother and baby Home in Tuam, from where she was forcibly separated from her then one-year-old son John Paschal and Bridie was forcibly put into the Magdalene Laundry in Galway City as punishment for her sins. She remained incarcerated till she escaped 15 years later along with two other inmates, who fled to England. Meanwhile, John Paschal remained in the Children Home Tuam until he was six. He was then fostered out by a farming family in Williamstown, Co Galway which was to become the setting of his second book 'Eggshells & Broken Dreams', years later.

Aged sixteen, John Paschal was forced to seek work in England( Manchester). Later, he met his mother Bridie, briefly, in Northampton and later still he emigrated to Australia aged twenty three. Two years later he returned to the UK and Ireland. After marrying Julie and having three children, he re-established contact with his mother Bridie Rodgers, who had by then married and was living happily in England. The story of her Magdalene ordeal became the subject of his first book, 'For the Love of My Mother.' It was first self-published in Ireland in 2005. In 2006 the rights to his book was bought by Hodder Headline London, after a frantic bidding auction. Later still it was bought and translated abroad. His follow-up book 'Eggshells & Broken Dreams' was published in 2010. J. P Rodgers also wrote and produced two 3-act plays, 'Delusion of Grandeur' and 'Hospital Case'. And for a time he worked as a Columnist with the London-based Irish Newspaper, the Irish World. J. P Rodgers worked in construction most of his life but writing had been a passion since childhood.

== Select bibliography ==
- For The Love of My Mother, Headline Publishing, 2007 OCLC 71808328.
- Eggshells and Broken Dreams, 2010 OCLC 655322563.
