= Ulster Magdalene Asylum =

The Ulster Magdalene Asylum was founded in 1839 at Donegall Pass, Belfast (now in Northern Ireland), by the Church of Ireland. It cared for "fallen women" like other Magdalene asylums. It was founded as part of the St. Mary Magdalene Parish and was to provide an asylum for "penitent females" with a chapel attached and named the Ulster Magdalene Asylum and Episcopal Chapel (St Mary Magdalene Chapel). It was opened on 1 December 1839. While the laundry closed in 1916, the institution survived and the home operated until the 1960s. Set up to rehabilitate the women, generally, women who were pregnant out of wedlock, women involved in prostitution and others convicted of petty crimes. It was described, "For the reception of erring and repentant females". As the residents, in keeping with similar institutions, worked in a laundry, the Asylum was sometimes termed the "steam laundry".

The English architect (and future MP and Mayor of Belfast) Sir Charles Lanyon renowned for many buildings in Ireland, particularly in Belfast, designed a new Gothic styled school and chapel for the Ulster Magdalene Asylum in 1851. The Ulster Magdalene Asylum in Belfast maintained a close relationship with other Protestant evangelical organisations set up in the Victorian era such as the Belfast Midnight Mission (which was a rescue for "unfortunate women and their offspring") as well as the Belfast Female Mission, a School was affiliated to the Asylum run by the Church Education Society these organisations shared members and trustees. The Magdalene Asylum was run by a board of trustees, five clergymen and four lay members of the church.

While the Ulster Magdalene Asylum was established by the Church of Ireland, similar institutions in Belfast were established for other denominations such as the Catholic refuge was set up at the Good Shepherd Convent, Ballynafeigh (established in 1867), or the earlier Ulster Female Penitentiary and Laundry, Edgar Home, named after its founder Rev. John Edgar, initially non-denominational but became associated with the Presbyterian Church. The Salvation Army also had a shelter.

The Ulster Magdalene Asylum was closed as a steam laundry in 1916 and demolished in 1918. During its existence from 1849–1916 it supplied shelter, maintenance, and instruction to upwards of 3,000 women. The Church provided services to women after the closure, as well as other services provided by the Belfast Mission.

Chaplains to the Asylum include a Rev. T.F. Miller, and Rev. Walter Riddell.

The Chapel survives as the parish of St Mary Magdalene, Donegall Pass, Belfast, and it celebrated its 175 anniversary in 2014.

== See also ==
- Magdalene laundries in Ireland
- Ulster Female Penitentiary
- Bethany Home
- Dublin Female Penitentiary
