= Ulster Female Penitentiary =

General information
- Type: Prison
- Location: Northern Ireland

Ulster Female Penitentiary and Laundry or Edgar Home, was a Mother and Baby home in Brunswick Street, Belfast. It evolved out of an institution founded in 1816. It was initially non-denominational. It was greatly expanded and developed when it came under Presbyterian control and Rev. John Edgar and the new home was opened in November 1839. Other denominations had their similar institutions in Belfast, such as the Catholic Good Shepherd Home, Ballynafeigh (established in 1867), and the Anglican Ulster Magdalene Asylum, Donegall Pass, also established in 1839.

The inmates who were described as 'Penitent Women', 'Fallen Women' or 'Victims of Seduction', were expected to stay two years. Religious and Vocational education was provided.

It was named Edgar Home, in 1892 after Dr. Edgar. A new building was built and opened in 1902 in the grounds of Whitehall House, Ormeau Road, Belfast, which is now Haypark Residential Home. The home closed in 1926.

== See also ==
- Magdalene laundries in Ireland
- Ulster Magdalene Asylum
- Bethany Home
- Dublin Female Penitentiary
