= Richard D. Webb =

Irish activist

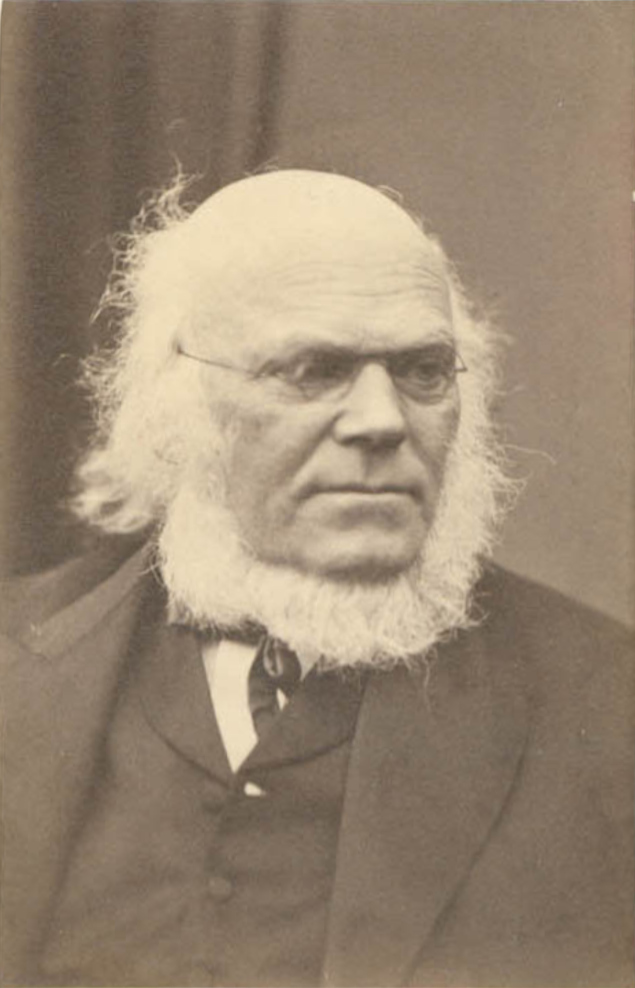
Richard D. Webb

Richard Davis Webb (1805–1872) was an Irish publisher and abolitionist.

== Life ==
Webb was born in 1805. In 1837, he was one of three founding members, with James Haughton and Richard Allen, of the Hibernian Antislavery Association. This was not the first antislavery association but it was acknowledged to be the most active and considered the most ardent abolitionists in Europe. Allen served as the secretary of this association.

Webb married Hannah Waring and they had four children Alfred, Richard, Deborah and Anne. Webb and his two sons Alfred and Richard were regular correspondents with the American abolitionist. William Lloyd Garrison.

Anti-Slavery Society Convention 1840, painting by Benjamin Robert Haydon. Move your cursor to identify participants or click the icon to enlarge

Webb was one of the few Irish delegates at the 1840 Anti-Slavery Convention in London which attracted hundreds from the United States. The Irish delegation included Webb, Richard Allen, and Daniel O'Connell. In 1846, Webb attended another world convention in London. This time the subject was temperance and Webb's fellow delegate Richard Allen was one of the speakers. Webb met the American delegates Wendell Phillips and his wife Ann and Ann reported how they were particularly impressed by Webb.

When Frederick Douglass visited Ireland it was Webb who was responsible for setting up his speaking engagements and also organising the printing of Douglass's book, The Narrative of the Life of Frederick Douglass. Douglass was earning up to £750 from a single print run and he was asking Webb for more copies.

Webb was notable in Douglass's regard for the arguments that he and Webb had. Douglass felt that white abolitionists would prefer to be hypocritical than be racist and would try not to disagree with him face to face. Webb however showed no such false regard and they argued as equals in a way the Douglass hoped would be a precursor of the relationships that might exist across the races when slavery ended in America.

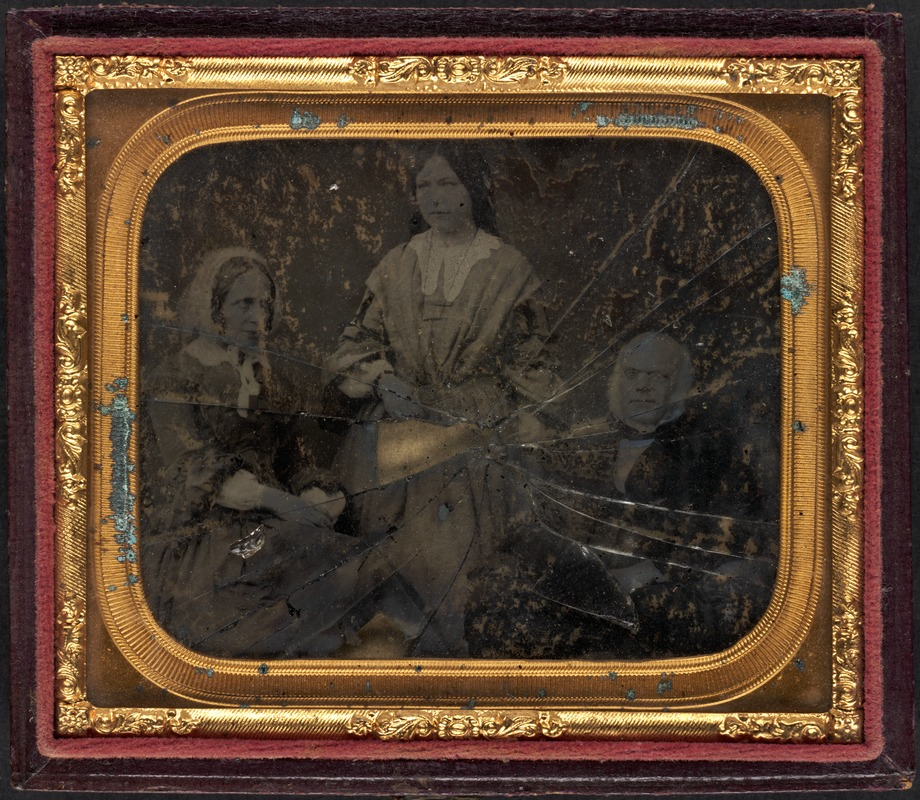
Richard and Hannah Webb with daughter, Annie Webb, ca. 1860. Print Department Collection, Boston Public Library

Webb wrote The Life and Letters of Captain John Brown, 1861

He died in 1872.
