= Bethany Home =

Irish women's home

Bethany Home (sometimes called Bethany House or Bethany Mother and Baby Home) was a residential home in Dublin, Ireland, mainly for Protestant unmarried mothers and their children, and also for Protestant women convicted of petty theft, prostitution, and infanticide. Most had a Church of Ireland background. The home was run and managed by evangelical Protestants, who, in the main, were Plymouth Brethren, Church of Ireland or Presbyterian. It catered to "fallen women" and operated in Blackhall Place, Dublin (1921–1934), and then in Orwell Road, Rathgar (1934–1972), until its closure. The home sent some children, some unaccompanied, to Northern Ireland, England, and to the United States.

== History ==
Bethany Home was founded in 40 Blackhall Place in Dublin in 1921 on the former site of the Dublin Prison Gate Mission, and moved in 1934 to Orwell Road, Rathgar, where it was based until it was closed in 1972. On opening the home in May 1922 the Church of Ireland Archbishop of Dublin, John Allen Fitzgerald Gregg, declared Bethany "a door of hope for fallen women". The Dean of Christ Church Cathedral presided over the first evening meeting setting up the Home. A Church of Ireland prison mission for women prisoners was incorporated into Bethany Home

Following the passage of the Registration of Maternity Homes Act, 1934, after at first attempting to exempt itself from its provisions, Bethany Home became subject to inspection by the Department of Local Government and Public Health.

In a letter dated 9 April 1945 from the Church of Ireland's then Archbishop of Dublin, Arthur William Barton, to Gerald Boland, then Minister for Justice, he described the home as "a suitable place for Protestant girls on remand". Bethany Home was already a place recognised by the courts as a place of detention.

Critical reports on nursed out Bethany children were compiled in January 1939 by inspectors in the Department of Local Government and Public Health. In August 1939, newspapers reported critical discussion at the Rathdown Board of Guardians on hospitalised Bethany children. The government's Deputy Chief Medical Adviser, Winslow Sterling Berry, visited the home on three occasions in 1939, once in February and twice in October. In February, Sterling Berry reversed an inspection report on a child said to have been in a "dying condition". The Report of the Mother and Baby Home Commission of Inquiry stated that the child died shortly afterwards. Sterling Berry rationalised mortality and illness in Bethany Home in October 1939 with, "it is well recognised that a large number of illegitimate children are delicate and marasmic from their birth." Sterling Berry observed that the home's most objectionable feature, that caused public controversy, was admittance of Roman Catholics into a proselytising institution. He successfully pressured Bethany Home's managing committee into ceasing the admission of Roman Catholics. The Residential Secretary, Hettie Walker, claimed in 1940 that the measure was only agreed to because of a threat of refusal of funding under new legislation.The high mortality rate that has occasioned controversy abated in 1940, but thereafter increased again up to 1944. Public scrutiny was not repeated.

The superintendent of the Church of Ireland's Irish Church Missions to the Roman Catholics, the Revd T.C. Hammond, was a member of the home's managing committee until he departed for Australia in 1935. In the 1950s Bethany Home facilitated the adoption of children by Protestant families in the United States, while some sent to Barnardo's in England may have been sent on to Australia.

During the 1960s children were transferred from the Bethany Home to the Protestant evangelical Westbank Orphanage in Greystones (which closed in 1998), from which few children were adopted.

Children from the Bethany Home were also sent to the Irish Church Mission managed, Boley Home, in Monkstown, Co. Dublin.

Bethany Home closed in 1972. In 1974, its assets were distributed to two other Church of Ireland run institutions, 85% to the Church of Ireland, Magdalen Home (founded by Lady Arabella Denny) on Leeson Street and 15% to Miss Carr's Home, North Circular Road, Dublin. The records of the Bethany Home are held by PACT (the Protestant adoption service), along with records of other Church of Ireland social services.

== Mount Jerome Graves ==
222 children died in Bethany Home between 1922–1949 and 219 were buried in unmarked graves in Mount Jerome Cemetery, Harold's Cross, Dublin. In 2010, a memorial meeting was held in the cemetery to remember them; in attendance were some former residents and relatives of residents along with public figures such as independent Senator David Norris, TD Joe Costello, and Labour Equality spokeswoman Kathleen Lynch.

== Bethany Survivors Group ==
The Bethany Home Survivors Group campaigns for redress on behalf former residents. The group has called on the Church of Ireland to publicly support this demand and to acknowledge its role in the home. The group called on the Irish government and on the Commission to Inquire into Child Abuse, to permit Bethany Home to be included in the state redress scheme, The group's call to be added to the State redress scheme for victims of child sexual abuse received political support. In May 2011 the survivors group met with the Church of Ireland's Archbishop of Dublin, the Most Revd Michael Jackson, as part of their campaign.

Former Bethany residents called for inclusion in an inquiry headed by Senator Martin McAleese, into the state's role in the Magdalene Laundries, as similarities were drawn between both institutions and the needs of survivors. Irish Education Minister Ruairi Quinn subsequently announced in June 2011 a refusal to include Bethany Home in the McAleese inquiry. In fact, the Deputy Minister at the Ministry of Health, Kathleen Lynch, was expelled from the Irish Parliament while trying to raise the issue of the survivors of Bethany House with the then-minister of the centre-right party Fianna Fáil. Justice for Magdalenes (JFM) then opposed Quinn's announcement and supported the call for the inclusion of the Bethany Home in the McAleese Inquiry.

On 16 September 2019, James Fenning and Paul Graham, were featured on BBC Newsline, about their fight for redress from the Irish Government.

== Bethany born notables ==
- Derek Leinster, writer (Hannah's Shame, 2005; Destiny Unknown, 2008), chairperson, Bethany Survivor Group.
- Patrick Anderson-McQuoid, artist who worked with the Irish Ballet Company in Cork City before founding and serving as artistic director of the Triskel Arts in that city; currently resident in County Leitrim.
- Tom McClean, former British paratrooper, SAS/Parachute Regiment, who planted the Union Jack on Rockall Island in 1985. He had been sent to an English orphanage at the age of 3. He authored Rough Passage (1983).

== See also ==
- Kirwan House
- Georgia Tann
- Belvedere Protestant Children's Orphanage
- Westbank Orphanage
- PACT (Protestant Adoption Society)
- Dublin Female Penitentiary, North Circular Road, Dublin
- St Patrick's Mother and Baby Home
- Mass grave
