= Magdalene laundry =

Religiously based workhouse-type facility for women

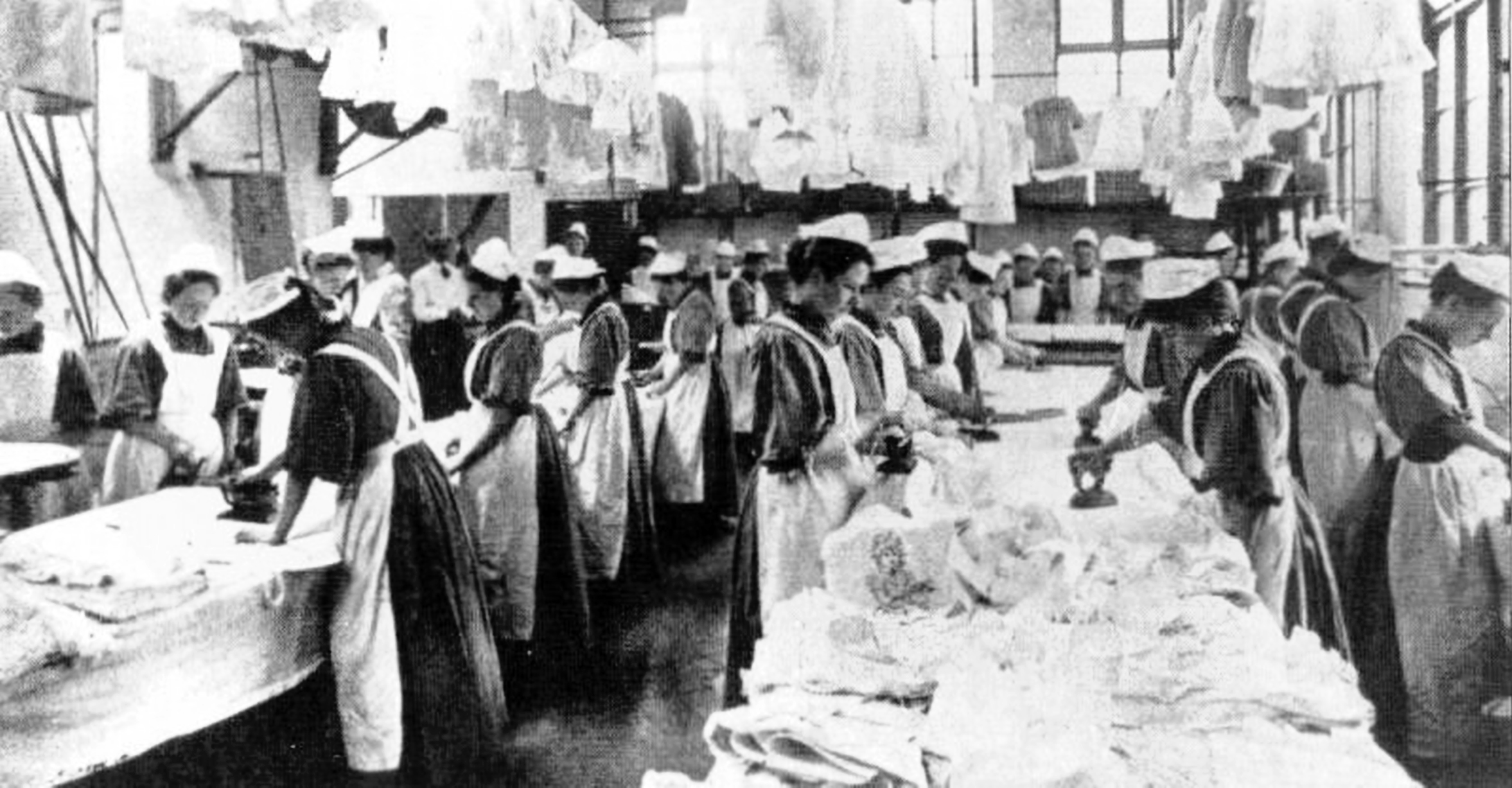
Magdalene laundry in England, early twentieth century

Magdalene asylums, also known as Magdalene laundries (named after the Biblical figure Mary Magdalene), were initially Protestant but later mostly Roman Catholic institutions that operated from the 18th to the late 20th centuries, ostensibly to house "fallen women".

The term referred to female sexual promiscuity or prostitution, young women (teens and children) who became pregnant outside of marriage, young girls and teenagers who did not have familial support, or young women (teens and children) who were deemed "difficult to handle" or "bad eggs". Some were girl children of prostitutes. They were required to work without pay apart from meagre food provisions, while the institutions operated large commercial laundries, serving customers outside their bases. Many of these "laundries" were effectively operated as penitentiary workhouses in which women did laundry, hence the name.

The strict regimes in the institutions were often more severe than those found in prisons. The nuns were brutal in their treatment of the young women, teens and children in their care. This contradicted the perceived outlook that they were meant to help women as opposed to punishing them. A survivor said of the working conditions: "The heat was unbelievable. You couldn't leave your station unless a bell went." Many of the properties "laundries" resided on have mass graves around and underneath them. Laundries such as this operated in the United Kingdom, Ireland, Sweden, Canada, the United States, and Australia, for much of the 18th century, all of the 19th century and most of the 20th century, the last one closing in 1996.

The first Magdalene institution was founded in late 1758 in Whitechapel, England. A similar institution was established in Ireland by 1767. The first Magdalene asylum in the United States was the Magdalen Society of Philadelphia, founded in 1800. All these were Protestant institutions. Other cities followed, especially from around 1800, with Catholic institutions also being opened. In the 19th and early 20th centuries, Magdalene asylums were common in several countries. By 1900, there were more than 300 asylums in England and more than 20 in Scotland.

== By country ==
=== England, Scotland, and Wales ===
Magdalen Hospital Act 1769 (Note: Section 2 of the Magdalen Hospital Amendment Act 1848 (11 & 12 Vict. c. xvi).)
- Act of Parliament
- Parliament of Great Britain
- Long title: An Act for the establishing and well governing an Hospital for the Reception, Maintenance, and Employment, of Penitent Prostitutes; and for extinguishing the Right of Common of and in certain Lands in Saint George's Fields, in the County of Surry.
- Citation: 9 Geo. 3. c. 31
- Territorial extent: Great Britain

Dates
- Royal assent: 1 May 1769
- Commencement: 8 November 1768 (Note: Start of session.)
- Repealed: 31 January 2013
Other legislation
Amended by	Magdalen Hospital Amendment Act 1848
Repealed by	Statute Law (Repeals) Act 2013

Status: Repealed

Text of statute as originally enacted

Magdalen Hospital Amendment Act 1848 (Note: Section 2.)
- Act of Parliament
- Parliament of the United Kingdom
- Long title: An Act to alter, amend, and enlarge the Powers and Provisions of an Act passed in the Ninth Year of the Reign of His Majesty King George the Third,[c] for establishing and governing the Magdalen Hospital.
- Citation: 11 & 12 Vict. c. xvii
- Territorial extent: United Kingdom

Dates
- Royal assent: 9 June 1848
- Commencement: 9 June 1848 (Note: The Acts of Parliament (Commencement) Act 1793.)
- Repealed: 31 January 2013
Other legislation
Amends	Magdalen Hospital Act 1769
Repealed by	Statute Law (Repeals) Act 2013

Status: Repealed

Text of statute as originally enacted

St. Mary Magdalen Hospital, Bath Act 1856
- Act of Parliament
- Parliament of the United Kingdom
- Long title: An Act for confirming a Scheme of the Charity Commissioners for Saint Mary Magdalen Hospital near Bath.
- Citation: 19 & 20 Vict. c. 45
- Territorial extent: United Kingdom

Dates
- Royal assent: 14 July 1856
- Commencement: 14 July 1856
- Repealed: 23 May 1950
Other legislation
Repealed by	Statute Law Revision Act 1950

Status: Repealed

Text of statute as originally enacted

Magdalen Hospital Amendment Act 1866
- Act of Parliament
- Parliament of the United Kingdom
- Long title: An Act for enabling the President, Vice-Presidents, Treasurer, and Governors of the Magdalen Hospital for the Reception of Penitent Prostitutes to sell and grant Leases of the present Site of the Hospital and other Lands belonging to them, to acquire a new Site for the Hospital, and to erect a Hospital thereon; and for other Purposes.
- Citation: 29 & 30 Vict. c. cxxx

Dates
- Royal assent: 28 June 1866
- Repealed: 31 January 2013
Other legislation
Repealed by	Statute Law (Repeals) Act 2013

Status: Repealed

Magdalen Hospital Charity Scheme Confirmation Act 1937 (Note: Section 2.)
- Act of Parliament
- Parliament of the United Kingdom
- Long title: An Act to confirm a Scheme of the Charity Commissioners for the application or management of the Charity called the Magdalen Hospital in the County of London.
- Citation: 1 Edw. 8 & 1 Geo. 6. c. xxiv
- Territorial extent: United Kingdom

Dates
- Royal assent: 10 June 1937
- Commencement: 10 June 1937
- Repealed: 31 January 2013
Other legislation
Repealed by	Statute Law (Repeals) Act 2013

Status: Repealed

Text of statute as originally enacted

The first Magdalen institution, Magdalen Hospital for the Reception of Penitent Prostitutes, was founded in late 1758 in Whitechapel, London by Robert Dingley, a silk merchant, Jonas Hanway and John Fielding. It was established in response to a public competition for the best scheme to tackle prostitution. Ten plans were judged by the Society for the Encouragement of Arts, Manufacture and Commerce between late May and early June 1758. These included plans already published by Dingley, Hanway and Fielding, as well as new proposals from Saunders Welch and Joseph Massie. The history of its name stems from Robert Dingley's suggestion that the institution be called 'Magdalen Charity House' and begin life in the London Infirmary's old buildings. The building in Whitechapel initially comprised a row of five seventeenth-century houses on Prescot Street, Goodman's Fields. Several years after the Magdalen Hospital opened, Dingley publicly exhibited a design for a new building. The plan was inspired by churches and monastic complexes, featuring a large central chapel with an ornate dome. It was not built on account of its expense, and perception of being too grand for its purpose.

The women at Magdalen Hospital worked at services and crafts to help provide financial support for the house. They were also given a small sum of money for their work. Additional income was generated by promoting the house as a tourist attraction for the upper classes. Horace Walpole, Fourth Earl of Orford, described staging one of these entertainments. This was in keeping with visits to Bethlem Royal Hospital and the Foundling Hospital. It later moved to Streatham, and could eventually house about 140 women, admitted between the ages of 15 and 40. Bristol (40 women) followed in 1800, Bath (79) in 1805, and many other cities in the years following, though their names mostly no longer included "Magdalene". Historians estimate that by the late 1800s, there were more than 300 Magdalene Institutions in England alone.

Visual literature for the Magdalen Hospital is generally limited to depictions produced by its governors and close associates. Key images from the eighteenth century include the frontispieces to 'Thoughts on the Plan for a Magdalen-House for Repentant Prostitutes' and 'Reflections, Essays and Meditations on Religion' by Jonas Hanway, as well as various published accounts of the charity from the 1760s. The exception is a rare satirical etching published anonymously on 12 June 1758. The only known impression of this print survives in the Ashmolean Museum.

In 1797, the Edinburgh Royal Magdalene Asylum was founded in the Canongate in Old Town, a popular location for street prostitutes. Some of the women were drawn to the city by industrialisation, some were pregnant and some had been forced into prostitution. Mary Paterson (also known as Mary Mitchell) was murdered by William Burke shortly after leaving the institution on 8 April 1828. The Edinburgh asylum moved to Dalry around 1842. The programme was supported in part by laundry and sewing work done by the residents. In Glasgow, the Magdalene Asylum became the Magdalene Institute and functioned until 1958.

The writer Charles Dickens and the philanthropist Angela Burdett-Coutts established an alternative in 1846, thinking the Magdalen Hospitals too harsh. At Urania Cottage, the young women were prepared for re-entry into mainstream society or for immigration to the colonies.

By the late 19th century, many of the institutions had departed from the original model and resembled penitentiary workhouses. The question of whether they should become subject to labour regulations and inspections as commercial laundries were became particularly controversial around the turn of the century, with sides often drawn on Irish/English and Catholic/Protestant lines. The Factory and Workshop Act 1901 (1 Edw. 7. c. 22) limited working hours for girls of thirteen to eighteen years of age to twelve hours a day, but exempted religious institutions. However, work by female factory inspectors during the 1900s decade managed to convince religious institutions to submit to voluntary inspections, and by the end of the 1900s, inspections were interdenominationally accepted in England. The normalisation of inspections and other regulations of institutions in England is considered to have softened their regime and improved conditions compared to Ireland.

By the 1950s, Magdalene asylums in Britain had mostly either closed or transformed into institutions with a narrower focus, like vocational training centres or approved schools.

=== Ireland ===
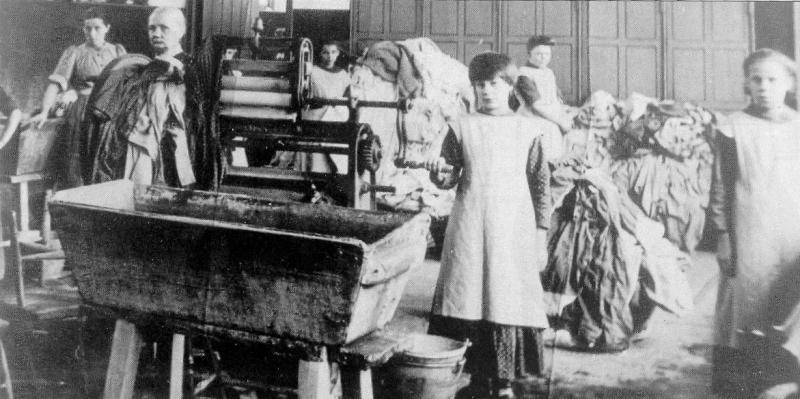
Irish asylum, c. early 20th century

The first Magdalene laundry or asylum in Ireland, an Anglican or Church of Ireland-run institution, Magdalen Asylum for Penitent Females, opened on Leeson Street in Dublin in 1767, after two years of preparation. It was founded by Lady Arabella Denny, admitted only Protestant women, and had an episcopal chapel. Around 1805, John England of Cork established a female reformatory together with male and female poor schools. Pending the opening of the Church of Ireland-run Magdalen Asylum in Cork, he maintained and ministered to many applicants. The Magdalene Asylum in Cork (Sawmill Street) opened in 1810. The last Magdalene laundry closed on 25 September 1996 on Seán MacDermott Street in Dublin.

In Belfast, Northern Ireland, the Church of Ireland-run Ulster Magdalene Asylum and episcopal chapel, was founded in 1839. The asylum closed in 1916 and the St Mary Magdalene chapel became a parish church. Parallel institutions were run by Roman Catholics and Presbyterians (the Ulster Female Penitentiary and Laundry). Irish historian Diarmaid Ferriter described the laundries as "a mechanism that society, religious orders and the state came up with to try to get rid of people deemed not to conforming to the so-called ... Irish identity."

The discovery in 1993 of a mass grave on the grounds of High Park—a former convent in Dublin—led to media articles about the operations of the institutions. Ultimately the UN Committee on the Rights of the Child called for a government inquiry into the Magdalene laundries. A formal state apology was issued in 2013, and a €60 million compensation scheme for survivors was established. By 2011, the four religious institutes that ran the Irish asylums had not yet contributed to compensate survivors of abuse, despite demands from the Irish government, and the UN Committee Against Torture. The religious sisters continue to care for more than 100 elderly Magdalene women who remain in their care. An estimated 600 survivors were still alive in March 2014.

Senator Martin McAleese chaired an Inter-Departmental Committee to establish the facts of State involvement with the Magdalen laundries. An Interim Report was released in October 2011. In 2013 the BBC did a special investigation, Sue Lloyd-Roberts' "Demanding justice for women and children abused by Irish nuns."

The Magdalene Sisters, a 2002 film by Peter Mullan, is based on historical facts about four young women incarcerated in a Magdalene laundry in Ireland from 1964 to 1968.

In 2011, a monument was erected in Ennis, County Clare, dedicated to the Sisters of Mercy, who had an industrial school and a Magdalene Laundry in the town. In 2015, Ennis municipal council decided to honour the same order by renaming a road in recognition of their "compassionate service to vulnerable women and children." The road runs through the site of the former industrial school and laundry. Local residents are divided about these honours.

=== United States ===
The first Magdalene asylum in the United States was the Magdalen Society of Philadelphia, founded in 1800. Other North American cities, including New York, Boston, San Francisco, and Chicago quickly followed suit.

Asylum records show that in the early history of the Magdalene movement, many women entered and left the institutions of their own accord, sometimes repeatedly. Lu Ann De Cunzo wrote in her book, Reform, Respite, Ritual: An Archaeology of Institutions; The Magdalene Society of Philadelphia, 1800–1850, that the women in Philadelphia's asylum "sought a refuge and a respite from disease, the prison or almshouse, unhappy family situations, abusive men, and dire economic circumstances." In its early years, the Magdalen Society Asylum functioned as a refuge for prostitutes. Most of these stayed a few days or a few weeks, just long enough to get reclothed and recuperated. Attempts at rehabilitation met with little success. In 1877, the asylum was changed into a home for "wayward girls", with a rule requiring a stay for twelve months. As the Magdalen Society Asylum became more selective, relaxed its emphasis on personal guilt and salvation, and standardized the treatment of inmates, its rate of failure diminished.

The Penitent Females' Refuge Society of Boston was incorporated in 1823.

New York's Magdalen Society was established in 1830 with the purpose of rescuing women from lives of prostitution and vice. Advocates of women sometimes kidnapped them from brothels.

The Magdalen Asylum, operated by the Magdalen Society in New York, provided a structured environment for women seeking refuge and rehabilitation. Upon entering the asylum, women were required to adhere to strict rules and regulations. They received religious instruction, engaged in prayer and devotional activities, and were expected to demonstrate repentance for their past actions. In addition to spiritual guidance, the Magdalen Asylum offered educational and vocational opportunities to its residents. Women received basic literacy and numeracy education and vocational training in areas such as "sewing, laundry work, or domestic service". The aim was to equip them with practical skills to help them reintegrate into society and secure employment outside the asylum. Critics argue that such organizations did little to address the underlying social and economic factors that often led women into prostitution, and instead focused on moral reform and control.

In 1907, a new home was established in the Inwood section of upper Manhattan. The Society had twice moved to a larger facility. Many of the young women who were temporary residents at the Inwood institution had worked in the taverns, brothels, and alleyways of lower Manhattan before being "rescued" by the Society. Girls were generally committed for a period of three years. Through the years, several girls died or were injured climbing out of windows in failed escape attempts. In 1917, the Magdalen Benevolent Society changed its name to Inwood House. In the early 1920s, bichloride of mercury was commonly used to treat new arrivals for venereal disease, as penicillin was not yet available. Some women suffered mercury poisoning, as happened with patients on the outside. The property was later sold and the agency relocated. Inwood House continues to operate, with its main focus on teen pregnancy.

=== Canada ===
The Congregation of the Sisters of Misericorde was founded in Montreal in 1848 by Marie-Rosalie Cadron-Jetté, a widow skilled as a midwife. Their network of asylums developed from their care of unmarried pregnant women until after they gave birth. In this period, unmarried women were encouraged to give their illegitimate children up for adoption. The Misericordia Sisters endeavoured to carry out their ministry discreetly, for the public was neither supportive of their cause nor charitable to the young women they aided. The sisters were accused of "encouraging vice". The order was particularly sensitive to the social stigma attached to a woman who had borne an illegitimate child. The sisters perceived that, by precluding other employment, this stigma often tended to force a woman into prostitution, and in some cases infanticide. According to Sulpician Father Éric Sylvestre, "When food was scarce, Rosalie would fast so that the moms could eat. She was fond of saying that 'Single mothers are the treasure of the house.'"

"In receiving patients no discrimination is made in regard to religion, colour, or nationality. After their convalescence, those who desire to remain in the home are placed under a special sister and are known as 'Daughters of St. Margaret'. They follow a certain rule of life but contract no religious obligations. Should they desire to remain in the convent, after a period of probation, they are allowed to become Magdalens and eventually make the vows of the Magdalen institute."

In 1858, Elizabeth Dunlop and others founded the Toronto Magdalene Laundries, with the stated goal of "eliminating prostitution by rehabilitating prostitutes".

=== Sweden ===
In Sweden, the first Magdalene asylum (Magdalenahem) was founded in Stockholm in 1852 by the philanthropist Emilie Elmblad. By 1900, there were eight asylums in Sweden, of which half were managed by the Salvation Army.

The asylums' purpose was to educate or train former female prostitutes in a different occupation, to make it possible for them to support themselves when they left the asylum. In practice, they were trained in domestic occupations in the asylums. The asylums tried to place former residents as domestic servants in private homes, preferably with religious employers. In this period, many people still worked as domestic servants, and women especially had limited work opportunities.

As the asylums were normally managed by religious women philanthropists such as Elsa Borg, the goal was not only to provide them with employment but to encourage their religious practice, which was thought to help them avoid returning to prostitution. The asylums provided the clients with factory work only if the first choice of being a domestic in a private religious home failed. Employment in a public establishment, such as a hotel or a restaurant, was considered the least desirable choice, as such work was considered to be a great risk for women in terms of reentering prostitution. This was in line with several other common private charitable establishments especially in Stockholm, which provided poor women in the cities with shelter and employment (normally as domestics) to prevent them from becoming prostitutes.

The asylums were charity institutions and founded in great part by the work of the women in domestic training there. Initially, women were paid for their work. This practice was abandoned when overseers concluded that it made women less inclined to follow rules. In Sweden, the majority of the inmates of the Magdalena asylums had voluntarily committed themselves, seeking help. There were known cases of women being committed by her family or by authorities. The Magdalena Asylum in Stockholm was closed in 1895.

=== Australia ===
From the early 1890s to the 1960s, most Australian state capitals had a large Roman Catholic convent that contained a commercial laundry where the work was done by the mostly teenage girls who were placed in the convent. They were committed, voluntarily or involuntarily, for reasons such as being destitute, "uncontrollable" as judged by family members or picked up by the police. According to James Franklin, the girls came from a variety of very disturbed and deprived backgrounds and were individually hard to deal with in many cases.

Laundry work was regarded as suitable as part of the work program for the girls, as it did not require much training nor substantial capital expense. Former inmates consistently have reported negative memories of conditions in the convent laundries, detailing verbal abuse by nuns and other supervisors, and very hard physical work under difficult conditions. In accordance with the traditions of the nuns, much of the day proceeded in silence. Like orphanages, these institutions received almost no government funds. As in any underfunded institution, the food was described as bland. The nuns shared the conditions of the women inmates, such as bad food, hard work, confinement, and long periods of silence. Education for residents was either of poor quality or lacking altogether. The sisters had no physical contact with the girls, nor emotional contact in the sense of listening to the girls' concerns.

Dangers included the infectious diseases of the time and workplace accidents. In 1889, one of the sisters of the Abbotsford Convent in Victoria lost her hand in an accident involving laundry machinery. In 1942, 14-year-old Doris Dyer lost her arm from the shoulder when she was caught in the laundry mangle at the Home of the Good Shepherd laundry in West Leederville, Western Australia (now the Catherine McAuley Centre).

The asylums were initially established as refuges, with the residents free to leave. In the early 1900s, they reluctantly began to accept court referrals. "They took in girls whom no-one else wanted and who were forcibly confined, contrary to the wishes of both the girls and the nuns." A 1954 report of the Sun Herald of a visit to the Ashfield laundry found 55 girls there involuntarily, 124 voluntary inmates, including 65 mentally challenged adult women, and about 30 who were originally there involuntarily but had stayed on. The dormitories were described as seriously overcrowded.

== In popular culture ==
=== Literature ===
- Ken Bruen, The Magdalen Martyrs, 2003.
- Rachel Dilworth, The Wild Rose Asylum: Poems of the Magdalene Laundries of Ireland, The University of Akron Press, 2009.
- Nancy Guilbert, Sweet Home, Didier Jeunesse, 2024.
- Claire Keegan, Small Things like These, Faber & Faber, 2021.
- J. P. Rodgers, For the Love of My Mother, Headline Publishing, 2007.

=== Cinema ===
- The Magdalene Sisters, by Peter Mullan, 2002, awarded the Golden Lion at the 2002 Venice Film Festival.
- Philomena, by Stephen Frears, 2013, with Judi Dench and Steve Coogan.
- Small Things like These, by Tim Mielants, 2024, with Cilllian Murphy and Emily Watson, adapted from Claire Keegan's novel and "Dedicated to the more than 56,000 young women who were sent to Magdalene institutions for 'penance and rehabilitation' between the years 1922 and 1998. And the children who were taken from them."

=== Television ===
- The Woman in the Wall, mini-series by Joe Murtagh, 2023, with Ruth Wilson and Daryl McCormack.

=== Theatre ===
- Eclipsed, by Patricia Burke Brogan, 1992.
- The Magdalen Whitewash, by Valerie Goodwin, 2002.

=== Music ===
See Magdalene laundries in Ireland / Music.

== See also ==
- Dar al-Reaya
- Duplessis Orphans
- Madelonnettes Convent
- Monto
- Mother and Baby Home
- Workhouse

== Bibliography ==
- Finnegan, Frances (2001). Do Penance or Perish: A Study of Magdalene Asylums in Ireland. Piltown, Co. Kilkenny: Congrave Press. ISBN 0-9540921-0-4., also Oxford University Press, 2004
- Hertz, Kayla (25 October 2015). "Today marks 18 years since the last Magdalene laundry in Ireland closed".
- O'Rourke, Maeve (2011). "Ireland's Magdalene Laundries and the State's failure to protect". Hibernian Law Journal. 10. Law Society Of Ireland. ISSN 1393-8940.
- Smith, James M. (2007). Ireland's Magdalen Laundries and the Nation's Architecture of Containment. Manchester: Manchester University Press. ISBN 978-0-7190-7888-0.
