= Dublin by Lamplight =

Magdalene laundry in Ireland

Dublin by Lamplight or the Lamplight Laundry, at 35 Ballsbridge Terrace, Ballsbridge, Dublin, was a Protestant-run Magdalene Laundry, founded in 1856, that like other such laundries housed so-called "fallen women". It was administered by a committee of Anglican women, a matron, and a chaplain who was a Church of Ireland priest. The motto of the asylum was "That they may recover themselves out of the snares of the devil" (II Timothy 2:24).

A chaplain and secretary to the laundry, Rev. Dr James S. Fletcher DD (parish priest of Brookfield, Milltown, Co. Dublin), wrote a paper titled "Our Female Penitentiaries Can Be Made Self-Supporting!", which was discussed at the International Prison Congress.

By 1915 the trustees of the organisation reported that the finances of the organisation were under strain and by February 1917 the trustees had requested that the company be wound up, citing competition from the nearby Swastika Laundry as well as the effects of the First World War.

The site later formed part of the six-acre Johnston Mooney and O'Brien manufacturing facility, and it featured in the Glackin Report following its sale in the 1990s to Telecom Éireann for £9.4 million, having been acquired by a consortium including Dermot Desmond and JP McManus a few months earlier for £4 million by the way of an Isle of Man entity.

The site of the institution has been redeveloped and now forms part of the campus of the Herbert Park Hotel and associated apartment blocks and offices. There is a campaign to have the location commemorated with a plaque.

== Popular media ==
It is mentioned in James Joyce's short story "Clay" in Dubliners.

== See also ==
- Magdalene laundries in Ireland
- Swastika Laundry
