= Protestant Adoption Society =

Adoption agency

PACT is an Irish adoption organisation founded in 1952, formerly called the Protestant Adoption Society. Its main office, Arabella House in Rathfarnham, is named after the philanthropist Lady Arabella Denny. PACT is a registered charity, providing a range of adoption services to Irish families and is accredited by the Adoption Authority of Ireland. PACT run the Here2Help Crisis Pregnancy Service.

Following legislation in 1952 which set up a legal framework for adoption in Ireland, the Protestant Adoption Society was set up in the offices of the Church of Ireland Moral Welfare Society.

PACT holds the records of closed Protestant-run homes in Dublin, including Denny House (Magdalene Mother and Baby Home) in Leeson Street, the Bethany Home in Rathgar, the Nursery Rescue Society in Templeogue, and Fairfield Children's Home in Sandymount.
