= Arabella Denny =

Irish philanthropist, founder of the Magdalen Asylum

Lady Arabella Fitzmaurice Denny (1707–1792) was an Irish philanthropist, and founder of the Magdalen Asylum for Protestant Girls in Leeson Street, Dublin in 1765.

== Early life and family ==
Arabella Fitzmaurice was born in County Kerry, the second daughter of Thomas FitzMaurice, 1st Earl of Kerry, and Anne Petty (daughter of Sir William Petty). As a teenager, she ran a basic medical dispensary for the tenants on her father's estate. She married Colonel Arthur Denny, M.P. for Kerry, on 26 August 1727. Lady Arabella was widowed at the age of thirty-five. A nephew of hers, William Petty, 2nd Earl of Shelburne, became Prime Minister of Great Britain.

Lady Arabella lived at Peafield Cliff House (now Lios an Uisce/Lisnaskea House), in Blackrock, Dublin where John Wesley, who founded and led the Methodist Church, visited her in 1783.

== Philanthropy ==
Lady Arabella Denny was a supporter of the Dublin Foundling Hospital, which had been established to care for children abandoned due to poverty and/or illegitimacy. In 1760, she presented a clock to the Dublin Workhouse; it was put up in the nursery for foundling children and used to regulate the feeding of infants.

She was instrumental in the reforming of the Foundling Hospital and, in 1764, was thanked by the Irish House of Commons for her "extraordinary bounty and charity". She worked with the Dublin Society, helping to introduce lace-making into workhouses, especially among the children there. In recognition of her work with the poor, she was conferred with the Freedom of the City of Dublin in 1765 and elected honorary member of the Dublin Society in 1766.

=== Magdalen Asylum Leeson Street ===
Her work with the Foundling Hospital brought her in contact with despairing young women forced to give up their children, homes, and families. In June 1767, she founded Magdalen Asylum for Protestant Girls in Leeson Street, a home for fallen women or penitent prostitutes who would work in exchange for accommodation, clothing, food, and religious instruction. The women would spend between 18 months and 2 years in the asylum and were only allowed to leave if they had a position to go to or they were permitted to return home It was the first institution of its kind in Ireland, and became a model for institutions throughout the country. The stated purpose was of delivering them "[...] from Shame, from Reproach, from Disease, from Want, from the base Society that ha[d] either drawn [them] into vice, or prevailed upon [them] to continue in it, to the utmost hazard of [their] eternal happiness".

Due to the harsh living conditions and rigid rules imposed on the women who lived there, these institutions have often been criticized, ultimately comparing them to actual industrial laundries, where the workers' labor, being unpaid, generated lucrative profits for the institutions. In Ireland, these places were known as Magdalene Laundries. It has been estimated that approximately 30,000 women were housed during the 150-year history of these institutions. The last Magdalene House in Ireland was closed on September 25, 1996. To this day, there are no exact statistics on how many women were housed in total. In 2013, an inquiry led by Irish Senator Martin McAleese, officially known as the “Report of the Interdepartmental Committee to Establish the Facts of the Irish State’s Involvement with the Magdalene Homes,” found that the Irish government and the Irish police force “Garda” were responsible for sending young women to the Magdalene Homes and failing to protect their rights as workers.

In 1773, she founded the Magdalene Chapel, an episcopal chapel frequented by many of high society in Dublin. Chaplains to the Magdalen Asylum included Rev. Dr. Joseph Henderson Singer FTCD (secretary of the Church Missionary Society, and Bishop of Meath), assistant Rev. J. Lowe. The writer Rev. Caesar Otway was an assistant chaplain. President was the Archbishop of Dublin, chaplain Rev. James Dunn, patrons included the Duchess of Gloucester. The Governance of the Magadalene Asylum, became the Leeson Street Trust, which was named in her honour the Lady Arabella Denny Trust, or Denny House, which is still a registered charity today. The Protestant Adoption Society which became PACT named its office Arabella House in her honour.

Lady Denny also established an almshouse in Tralee.

== Retirement and death ==
Arabella Denny retired in 1790 and died in Dublin on 18 March 1792. She had a fear of being buried alive and left instructions that she should not be removed from her deathbed for at least seventy-two hours.
