= Bessborough Mother & Baby Home =

Former institution in Blackrock, County Cork, Ireland

Coordinates: 51.884266°N 8.411302°W

The Bessborough Mother & Baby Home (also known as the Bessborough Sacred Heart Home) was a home for mothers and their children that operated at Bessborough House in Blackrock, County Cork, Ireland, from 1922 until 1998. It was included in an investigation by the Irish government following the discovery of an unmarked mass grave at Bon Secours Mother and Baby Home in Tuam, County Galway. The home was run by Sisters of the Sacred Hearts of Jesus and Mary, a religious order of Catholic nuns.

The home was one of the largest in Ireland, with 9,768 women and 8,938 children being admitted. Forced adoptions are recorded in the report, including children who were adopted to families in the United States in return for cash donations, while over 900 children died. Their bodies were buried in unmarked graves.

== Life at Bessborough ==
On arrival expectant mothers were given new names and ordered not to speak of their pasts. They were then set to work, often doing laundry for local businesses or cleaning the home. By the 1980s the jobs available to mothers had diversified to include pottery and hairdressing, for which they were now being paid. Some women were allowed to study for their leaving certs and other qualifications. However forced hard labour was still being reported by survivors.

By the 1950s women were spending less than six months in the home, on average. This was much lower than at some other homes in which women could be expected to stay for up to three years. A significant cause of the decline in time spent in the home was driven by an increase in early adoption of even younger children. In some cases this was done willingly due to societal shame or poverty, however many mothers were ordered to sign their babies away against their will.

Stories from three survivors of the home are documented in a 2022 book by Dierdre Finnerty, Bessborough: Three Women. Three Decades. Three Stories of Courage. Other survivors and staff were interviewed as part of the government commission.

Infant mortality rates varied greatly over the decades at the home. In the 1920s and 1930s mortality rates were often above 30%, they then spiked to 75% in 1943 before declining. By the 1960s death rates were around the national average. In total, 923 children died at Bessborough.

== Comparisons with other Mother & Baby Homes ==
The Sisters of the Sacred Heart were responsible for three homes in Ireland during this period. The other two were also found to have high death tolls and stories of abuse. They were Castlepollard Mother & Baby Home, County Westmeath, and Sean Ross Abbey in Roscrea. The latter is the part of the setting of Philomena. All three had high death tolls, particularly Sean Ross Abbey where 1,024 children died. The home in Tuam, which brought the issue of infant mortality at the homes to attention of the public, was run by a separate organisation and recorded 796 child deaths. Following a 2017 test excavation, much of the human remains were found in an "underground structure divided into 20 chambers". The chambers appeared to be a sewerage tank but it is undetermined if it was ever used. Some state run homes, including Stranorlar County Mother & Baby Home saw fewer fatalities. St Patrick's Mother and Baby Home, or 'Pelletstown' in Dublin may have had the highest death toll anywhere in Ireland with at least 3,512 deaths recorded by the official investigation.

No reburials have been undertaken at any Mother and Baby Home in Ireland.

Similar finds have occurred in homes run by Catholic organisations elsewhere, including at Kamloops Indian Residential School in Canada, Smyllum Park, Lanarkshire, and St Josephs Orphanage, Vermont.

== Further Developments ==
In February 2026, plans to construct 140 apartment units on the former grounds of Bessborough were approved by Cork City council. The decision was met with condemnation from survivors and campaigners. Of the 923 children who died only 64 graves have been found, leading to fears the development will encroach on undiscovered grave sites.

In June 2026 a vigil was held at the site. A survivor stated they would be willing to chain themselves to construction equipment to prevent the development.

Councillor Peter Horgan and Bessborough Mother and Baby Home Support Group lodged appeals with the planning commission, An Coimisiún Pleanála.

== See also ==
- Mother and Baby Homes Commission of Investigation
- Bethany Mother and Child Home
- Cavan Orphanage Fire
- St Patrick's Mother and Baby Home
- Magdalene Laundries in Ireland
- Bon Secours Mother and Baby Home
- Stranorlar Mother & Baby Home
- St Patrick's Mother and Baby Home
- 2021 Canadian Indian residential schools gravesite discoveries
