= Stranorlar County Mother & Baby Home =

Former maternity home in Stranorlar, County Donegal, Ireland

Coordinates: 54.80554°N 7.75072°W

The Stranorlar County Home or Stranorlar Mother & Baby Home, Stranorlar, County Donegal, Ireland was a home for unmarried women from about 1924 until the 1960s. It was one of 18 institutions investigated as part of the Irish Government's 2021 investigation into abuse and high death rates at mother and baby homes following the discovery of the remains of hundreds of children at Bon Secours Mother and Baby Home in Tuam, County Galway who had been buried in a septic tank. Stranorlar was included in the investigation as one of four state-run institutions to provide a representative sample of other similar Homes which were not investigated.

1,630 women were admitted to the home during the 38 years of operation, the youngest of whom was 13 years old. 99% of women were from County Donegal; others came from counties Sligo, Tyrone, Cork and Antrim. Women were to put to work in the laundry, washing clothes for local businesses. Deaths, forced adoptions, poor burial practices and abuse are detailed in the report.

== History ==
Stranorlar Mother & Baby Home opened in the nineteenth century as a workhouse for the local poor and continued as such throughout the Great Famine. By 1924 it had transformed into a state-run home for unmarried pregnant women and their children. It was operated by the Sisters of Mercy.

The home's early years were marked by high infant mortality, with over 40% of children dying in some years. Surviving children were described as 'delicate’, or ‘mentally defective’ and one who ‘does not speak’. Meals for children were given out five times a day, prepared by the mothers in the home's kitchen, but did not contain any fruit. Most meals consisted of bread and butter or mashed potatoes. A trained nurse was hired in 1942 after 11 deaths in one year.

By 1960 admissions were rare, with the final woman to enter the home arriving in 1964.

== Life at Stranorlar ==
Most mothers were between the ages of 17 and 29 and most were about six months pregnant on arrival. After giving birth women were encouraged to breastfeed for a short time but were not allowed to spend time with their child in case they grew attached to each other. Miss Lister, the state inspector, defended this at the time, saying: "There is under this system no fostering of affection for and interest in their children. On the other hand, if we have nothing to offer the mother eventually but complete separation from her child, it is perhaps kinder to avoid the growth of affection. Nevertheless, we may have to consider whether or not the loss of maternal care may have some share in the mounting death rate."

Women were forced to work long hours in the laundries or cooking and cleaning at the home. They attended mass on Sundays but were given shawls on entry to the church, allowing the congregation to identify the local 'fallen women.' This practise was described in the report as being unnecessarily cruel by Sister Stanislaus, a matron in the home at the time.

Most children left the home with their mother, although some were sent to boarding schools. At least 14 were adopted out after 1952; the 2021 investigation noted that adoptions to the United States were difficult to organise at this time due to objections from the government. Survivors in the investigation spoke of local landowners appearing at the home to adopt babies of their choosing.

== Mortality rates and burials ==
By 1945, 20 mothers had died at the home along with at least 343 children. Death rates at the home exceeded 40% during the 1930s, before declining to close to the national average by the 1950s.

Staff had little medical training or sympathy for expectant mothers. One witness who contributed to the report, known only as 'Fran,' describes being told to scrub floors whilst in labour before being put in a long bath to ease the pain. Her baby died and was immediately buried in an unknown location. Burials of this type are common in the report, with concerns frequently raised over the standard of the graveyard. The graveyard was at the bottom of a hill and so was prone to flooding. Further, the graveyard had been in use since before the Famine so was already overcrowded and infested with rats. Gravediggers spoke of accidentally breaking into older coffins while digging new graves as all graves were unmarked so often overlapped. Drainage was not an option due to a dispute with a local landlord so a new graveyard was deemed necessary in 1945 due to the existing one being 'in a wretched state.' The situation continued to worsen until the new graveyard opened in 1950.

The graves were all left unmarked and are now part of the fairway of Ballybofey & Stranorlar Golf Club.

== Comparisons with other mother & baby homes ==
Stranorlar was included in the report, along with three other county run homes, to create a fair description of conditions in the various other county homes scattered around the country. Fewer children died at Stranorlar than in Tuam, Bessborough Mother & Baby Home in County Cork, Bon Secours Mother and Baby Home in Tuam, Sean Ross Abbey in Rosscrea or St Patrick's Mother and Baby Home in County Dublin.

== See also ==
- Bethany Mother and Child Home
- Cavan Orphanage fire
- Magdalene laundries in Ireland
- Castlepollard Mother & Baby Home
- Canadian Indian residential school gravesites
