= Castlepollard Mother & Baby Home =

Former maternity home in Castlepollard, County Westmeath, Ireland

Coordinates: 53.676430°N 7.299739°W

The Castlepollard Mother & Baby Home (also known as the Sacred Hearts Home) that operated between 1935 and 1971 in the town of Castlepollard, County Westmeath, Ireland, was a maternity home for unmarried mothers and their children in the former Kinturk Demesne or Manor previously owned by the 'Old English' Pollard family. The Home was run by the Sisters of the Sacred Hearts of Jesus and Mary, a religious order of Catholic nuns.

Over the course of its operation, 4,972 unmarried pregnant women were sent to the Home to give birth and work while 4,559 children are known to have been born in the home, at times with little medical assistance despite the employment of a local doctor as medical supervisor. Higher than average infant mortality, irregular adoptions and physical and/or emotional abuse have been alleged at the Home. Castlepollard was one of 18 homes investigated by the Irish government following the discovery of the remains of hundreds of babies at the Bon Secours Mother and Baby Home in Tuam, County Galway and Bessborough in County Cork. The report reported decades of abuse and negligence resulting in the deaths of hundreds of children, and in some cases mothers, in mother and baby homes in general. It has been alleged that many children born in mother and baby homes were irregularly or illegally adopted to families in Ireland and the US, often in exchange for money, after mothers were coerced to sign non-legal papers assigning their parental rights over their children to the Sisters of the Sacred Hearts or their agents. These allegations relate to certain periods in the history of the homes and may not relate throughout the whole history of their existence.

== History ==
Established in 1935 on the grounds of Kinturk Manor House (built c.1760 with additional wings in 1821 and former home of the Pollard family) with capacity for 37 women and 20 children, the Sisters of the Sacred Hearts of Jesus and Mary opened Castlepollard for unmarried, pregnant women. By 1937, 56 women and 48 children were registered at the Home.

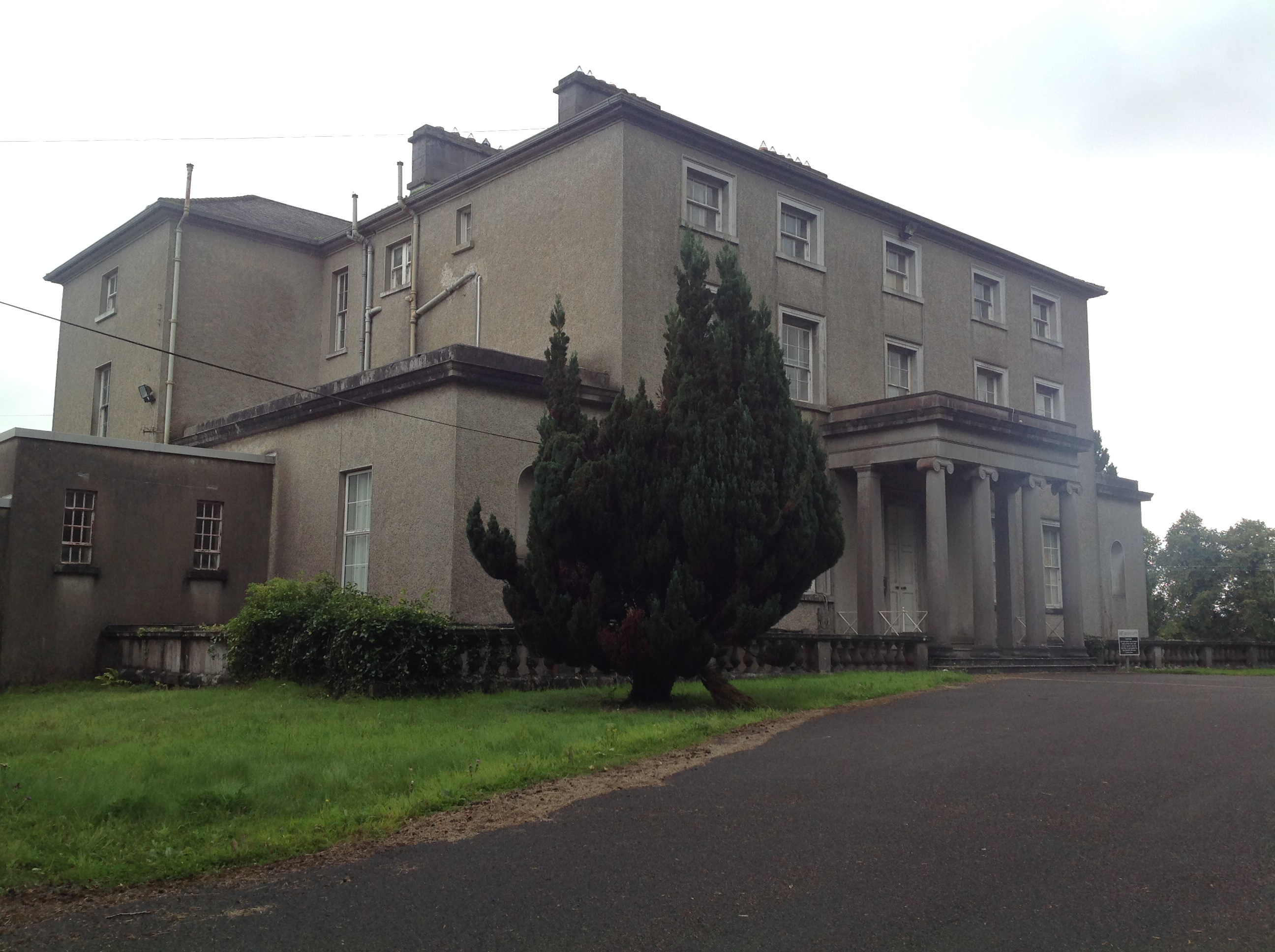

A new hospital was built c.1938 - 1941. This building was built to designs by Thomas J. Cullen (1879-1947) and was part of an extensive hospital construction programme initiated during the first decades of the Free State. Its construction was probably largely funded by money raised through the Irish Hospital Sweepstakes, as was the case with most Irish hospitals built at this time.

By 1941 the population in the home had increased to more than three times the Home's original capacity - the new hospital having not been finished by this stage. Some women were forced to sleep in the nearby annexe - former servants' quarters/bothy surrounding the enclosed farmyard. At least 34 infants were alleged to have died around this time.

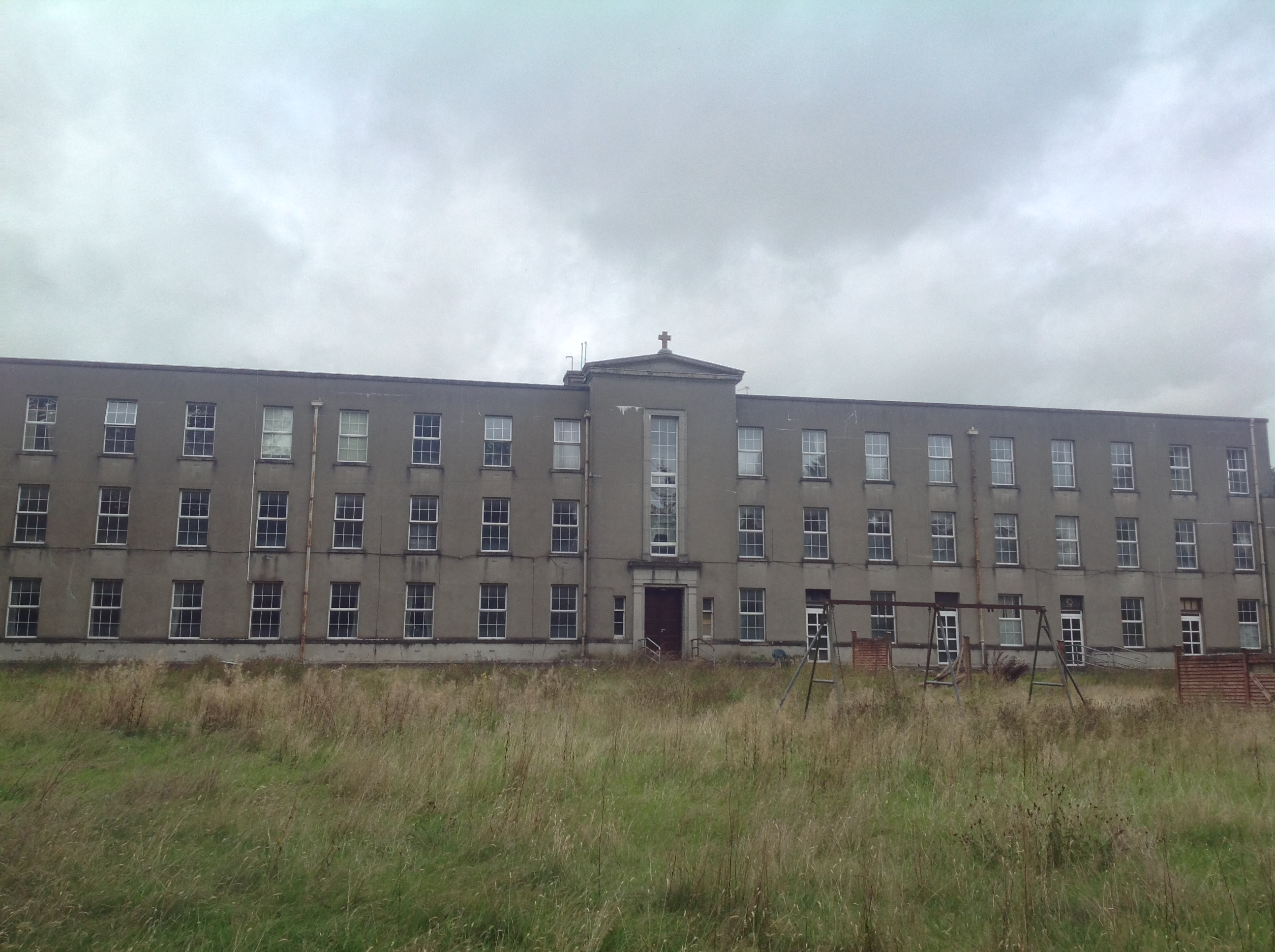

Following state intervention, only one new admission was accepted in 1941 with other mothers being sent to Sean Ross Abbey in County Tipperary or Bessborough. In 1942, with the opening of the new hospital, capacity was expanded to house 109 women and their children. Women were sent to the home from across Westmeath and neighbouring counties, including County Meath, County Cavan, and County Offaly. After expansion it began to take in women from County Longford, County Louth and County Monaghan. Early opposition to its establishment came from the Meath Board of Health in Trim, who argued that moving unmarried women to Castlepollard would hinder the capacity of the Health Board's own laundry service.

By 1945 Dr Ward, a Meath councillor had raised a list of concerns about the Home to authorities. These included beatings and forced hard labour for undernourished pregnant women beginning at 5:30 AM. Dr Ward reported that some children with diarrhoea were neglected to the extent that their intestines protruded. Nurseries were reportedly unheated with windows left open year-round. Unsurprisingly, the death rate amongst infants was above 10%, however this was an improvement from a high of 30%.

The women taken into the homes were often very young - nationally 11% were under 18 - or suffered from mental disabilities. Many, including Residents A and H who gave evidence to the investigation, had been raped before entering the home. In 1946 a man was convicted of having 'carnal knowledge' of a 'feeble-minded' woman of 'low mentality.' The man was given a year of hard labour as punishment, his victim was placed in the Mother and Baby Home where some women were put to work for over three years and had to give up their children. The youngest expectant mother sent to Castelpollard was 12

In 1949 the infant death rate at the Home declined to a national average of 3%, prompting words of praise from Department of Local Government and Public Health inspector, Miss Lister: "This is the lowest death rate yet in our special homes for mothers and babies and I think some recognition should be conveyed to the community and the doctor. The health of the children is on the whole, excellent, and they are well cared for." The official investigation interviewed some of those present at the time who described being beaten with sticks.

By the 1950s and 1960s adoption became the dominant manner of departures for infants at Castlepollard, 43 were adopted by families in the US in 1958. Official infant death rates at the Home remained near the national average in this period. The Home also began taking in children born with profound mental and/or physical disabilities from married families who were unable to care for them, which would be the main activity of the home following cessation as a mother and baby home. Closure due to declining numbers has been discussed as early as 1959, however concerns were raised that Sean Ross Abbey and Bon Secours Mother and Baby Home in Tuam were also scheduled for closure may leave the remaining Sacred Heart Home in Bessborough dangerously overcrowded. Closure finally occurred in 1971. Thereafter, the home was named St. Peter's Hospital, and later St. Peter's Centre, operated by the Irish government's Health Service Executive as it remains today.

In 2021, the Sisters of the Sacred Hearts issued an apology for past wrongdoings. The Sisters of the Sacred Heart apology said that "Irish society demanded that many unmarried women would have their babies in secret. Some religious communities provided a service in response to these societal norms and demands, driven by the secrecy and shame which surrounded pregnancy out of wedlock." The apology went on to say that although "we are distressed and saddened that it is so difficult to prove with legal certainty where many of these infants were buried" they wished to "recognise and place on record that many of our Sisters over the decades dedicated their lives and worked tirelessly in providing care for women and children."

== Life at Castlepollard ==
Unmarried pregnant women were sent to Castlepollard, as was said, to: "work off the (perceived) sin of pregnancy outside of marriage". They were given 'House Names' and forbidden from revealing any personal information that may reveal who they had been before they entered the Home.

Work often involved running a laundry for local businesses and churches who took advantage of the cheaper products offered by the nuns. Other tasks could also be given to women, including chopping firewood and domestic cleaning. Others were tasked with looking after the children. Women could be expected to work from 5:30am until 9pm (dates of this regime are uncertain) with some breaks. Few accommodations were given to the heavily pregnant or new mothers and births were overseen by junior nuns who were often untrained, particularly for complex births. It was alleged that little pain relief or other medical assistance was offered including to children when they fell ill, though this may relate to a specific era as a medical officer was appointed to the home.

Babies were breastfed for a few months as was the norm, but women were forbidden from spending too much time with their children in case they developed a mutual bond. Babies were weaned prematurely and put onto insufficient diets early on, contributing to the high death rate in the institution. Survivors tell of violent beatings, malnourishment, mental torture and isolation. Those neonates who did not survive were buried in a communal graveyard below the Home without individual markers. Some babies were buried in shoeboxes as opposed to wooden coffins. All were buried in the graveyard provided for the nuns.

The former caretaker (the late Mr. Peter Fagan of Dublin Road) of the home in Castlepollard arranged for a memorial stone to be erected in the graveyard at his own expense.

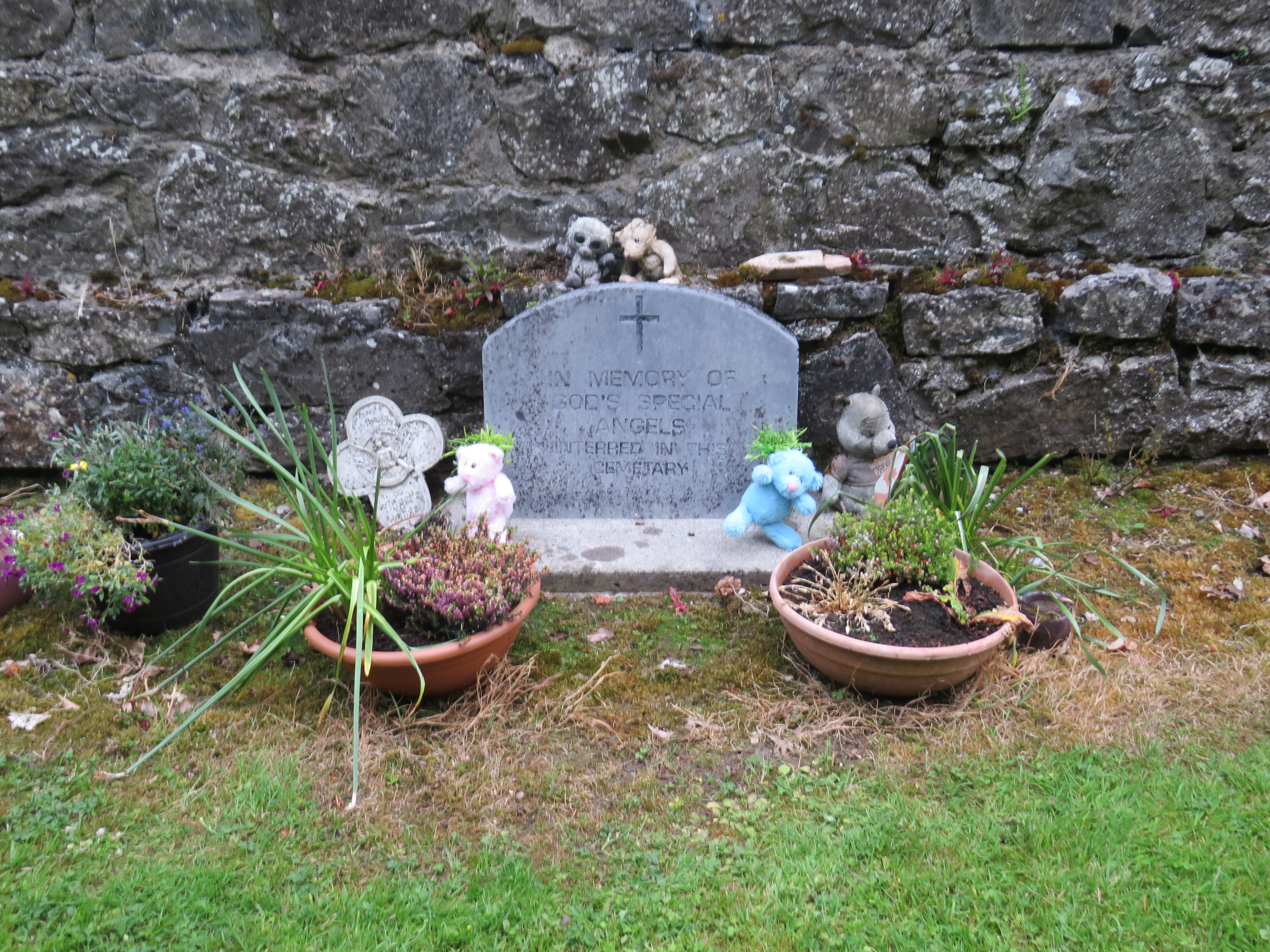

Estimates of how many infants died at Castlepollard vary. A confirmed figure of 247 is given by the report, but does not include those with unclear locations of death. At least 9 Mothers died at the Home, one being buried in the graveyard with a headstone.

== Comparisons with other Mother & Baby Homes ==
The number of fatalities at Castlepollard is likely the lowest death toll of the three Sacred Hearts-run Mother & Baby Home's in Ireland: 921 children died at Bessborough, and 1,024 at the Sean Ross Abbey in Roscrea. Tuam, the Home which brought the issue of infant mortality at the Homes to attention of the public was run by a separate organisation and recorded 796 child deaths, with burials taken place in a subterranean concrete structure described as a 'septic tank' but not ever used as such. Some state run homes, including Stranorlar County Mother & Baby Home also saw more fatalities St Patrick's Mother and Baby Home, or 'Pelletstown' in Dublin may have had the highest death toll anywhere in Ireland with at least 3,512 deaths recorded by the official investigation. No reburials have been undertaken at any Mother and Baby Home in Ireland, as it is unlikely that infant remains persist or survive burial.

== Use of the Home Today ==
The home is owned by the HSE having been transferred to state ownership. The 1938 Hospital building and 1760 Kinturk Manor House lie empty. A smaller building (additional to the 1938 Hospital Building) is operated by the HSE as a public medical centre. A gymnasium with therapeutic swimming pool is also on the campus. A number of bungalows continue to be used as residences for people with disabilities as operated by the HSE. A walled garden and an enclosed farmyard with period buildings also lie empty and in a state of decay. A craftwork building is currently not used.

== See also ==
- Bethany Mother and Child Home
- Cavan Orphanage Fire
- St Patrick's Mother and Baby Home
- Bessborough Mother & Baby Home
- Magdalene laundries in Ireland
- Bon Secours Mother and Baby Home
- Stranorlar County Mother & Baby Home
- St Patrick's Mother and Baby Home
- Canadian Indian residential school gravesites
