= Sex in a Cold Climate =

- Directed by: Steve Humphries
- Narrated by: Dervla Kirwan
- Edited by: Andy Attenburrow
- Distributed by: Testimony Films; Channel 4
- Release date: March 1998
- Running time: 50 minutes
- Country: Ireland
- Language: English

Sex in a Cold Climate is a 1998 Irish documentary film detailing the mistreatment of "fallen women" in the Magdalene laundries in Ireland. It was produced and directed by Steve Humphries and narrated by Dervla Kirwan. It was used as a source for the 2002 film, The Magdalene Sisters.

The film was produced by Testimony Films and aired on Channel 4 in March 1998.

== Film content ==
The documentary includes the stories of four women, three of whom were incarcerated in Magdalene asylums in Ireland: Brigid Young is the only one of the four women interviewed who never experienced a laundry, but she grew up in an adjoining orphanage in Limerick. She recalls how a priest masturbated on her dress in confession, then walked away as if nothing had happened, and how she was too inexperienced to know what had happened. Phyllis Valentine was sent from her orphanage in County Clare to an asylum in Galway aged just 15 because the nuns at the orphanage considered her to be "too pretty" and at risk of "falling away" (in other words, becoming pregnant); Martha Cooney told a relative she had been sexually assaulted by her cousin, and she was whisked off to a laundry too; and Christina Mulcahy gave birth to a child out of wedlock. The child was taken away from her and put up for adoption, and Mulcahy was then disowned by her family before being taken to a laundry in Galway while she was still lactating.

The women recall the abuse they suffered at the hands of Catholic religious orders and the gruelling working regime in the laundries. Brigid Young once had her hair cut off by the mother superior for getting too friendly with one of the penitents. While many of the penitents stayed in the laundries all their lives, Phyllis Valentine, Martha Cooney, and Christina Mulcahy eventually left the laundries under different circumstances: Valentine began to rebel against the nuns, refusing to do her work, even letting her hair grow and throwing a tantrum when the nuns brought a hairdresser in to cut it. Eventually, in 1964, after eight years incarceration, Valentine was released. Cooney spent four years in an asylum before she was rescued by her cousin. Mulcahy, meanwhile, was facing the prospect of life inside the laundry, but after three years, she managed to escape, and she fled to Northern Ireland to work as a nurse.

Adapting to life outside, however, proved to be a challenge. Phyllis Valentine says she felt people knew that she'd been in a Magdalene laundry, even though in truth, they knew nothing about her. Valentine later married and had children, but she was uncomfortable with the sexual aspect of the marriage, since the nuns had never prepared her for the outside world. As a result, she and her husband gradually drifted apart. Martha Cooney never married, because, in her own words, "I never wanted anybody to have power over me, or chain me ever again". Christina Mulcahy also married and had children, but did not tell her family about her illegitimate son until she was diagnosed with a terminal illness. With her family's help, Mulcahy was reunited with her son shortly before her death in February 1997.

== Reception ==
Although made in and recounting events in Ireland, the state broadcaster, RTÉ, declined to broadcast the documentary, and it was first shown on the UK's Channel 4. Approximately 450 survivors contacted a helpline after the first airing.

The documentary inspired Peter Mullan's 2002 film, The Magdalene Sisters, which based in narrative on that of four women featured in the documentary, and is referenced in the 2013 film, Philomena.

A historian, James M Smith, a leading researcher on the laundries and a member of the Justice for Magdalenes advisory committee, noted a shortcoming was that it didn't "incorporate the religious orders' version of the Magdalene story", but that "the survivor testimony has been consistent."
