= Mother and Baby Homes Commission of Investigation =

Irish state commission (2015–2021)

Commission of Investigation into Mother and Baby Homes and certain related matters
- Established: 17 February 2015
- Dissolved: 28 February 2021
- Legal status: Commission of investigation
- Location: 73 Lower Baggot Street, Dublin 2
- Coordinates: 53.3346°N 6.2456°W
- Members: 3
- Chairperson: Judge Yvonne Murphy
- Key people: William Duncan, Mary E. Daly
- Budget: €7 million per annum, approximately (Note: On establishment, the budget for the commission was announced as being €21 million, to cover a planned three-year lifespan.)
- Website: mbhcoi.ie

The Mother and Baby Homes Commission of Investigation (officially the Commission of Investigation into Mother and Baby Homes and certain related matters) was a judicial commission of investigation, established in 2015 by the Irish government to investigate deaths and misconduct during the 20th century in mother and baby homes—institutions, most run by Catholic religious nuns, where unwed women were sent to deliver their babies. It was set up following statements that the bodies of up to 800 babies and children may have been interred in an unmarked mass grave in the Bon Secours Mother and Baby Home, located in Tuam, County Galway. Its remit additionally covered investigation into the records of and the practices at an additional thirteen Mother and Baby Homes. The members of the three-person commission were Judge Yvonne Murphy (chairperson), William Duncan and Mary E. Daly.

Originally scheduled to issue its final report by February 2018, the commission was granted a series of extensions. The final report was published on 12 January 2021, and detailed that around 9,000 children, one in seven of those born in the 18 institutions covered by the commission's terms of reference, had died in them between 1922 and 1998, double the rate of infant mortality in the general population. The following day, Taoiseach Micheál Martin made a formal apology to survivors on behalf of the state. The commission was dissolved on 28 February 2021.

== Background ==
Amateur historian Catherine Corless conducted research into babies born at the Bon Secours Mother and Baby Home in her hometown of Tuam, Galway. She collected data for several years, and published several articles in local newspapers in 2010, 2013, and 2014; her research suggested that the bodies of 796 babies and children may have been interred in an unrecorded mass grave at the Tuam Baby Home. Her research was brought to the attention of Alison O'Reilly, a reporter at the Irish Mail on Sunday. O'Reilly wrote an article on the subject in 2014, which garnered widespread international attention. Following the article, there were calls for an investigation of the site and for an inquiry into all such institutions.

=== Bon Secours Mother and Baby Home ===
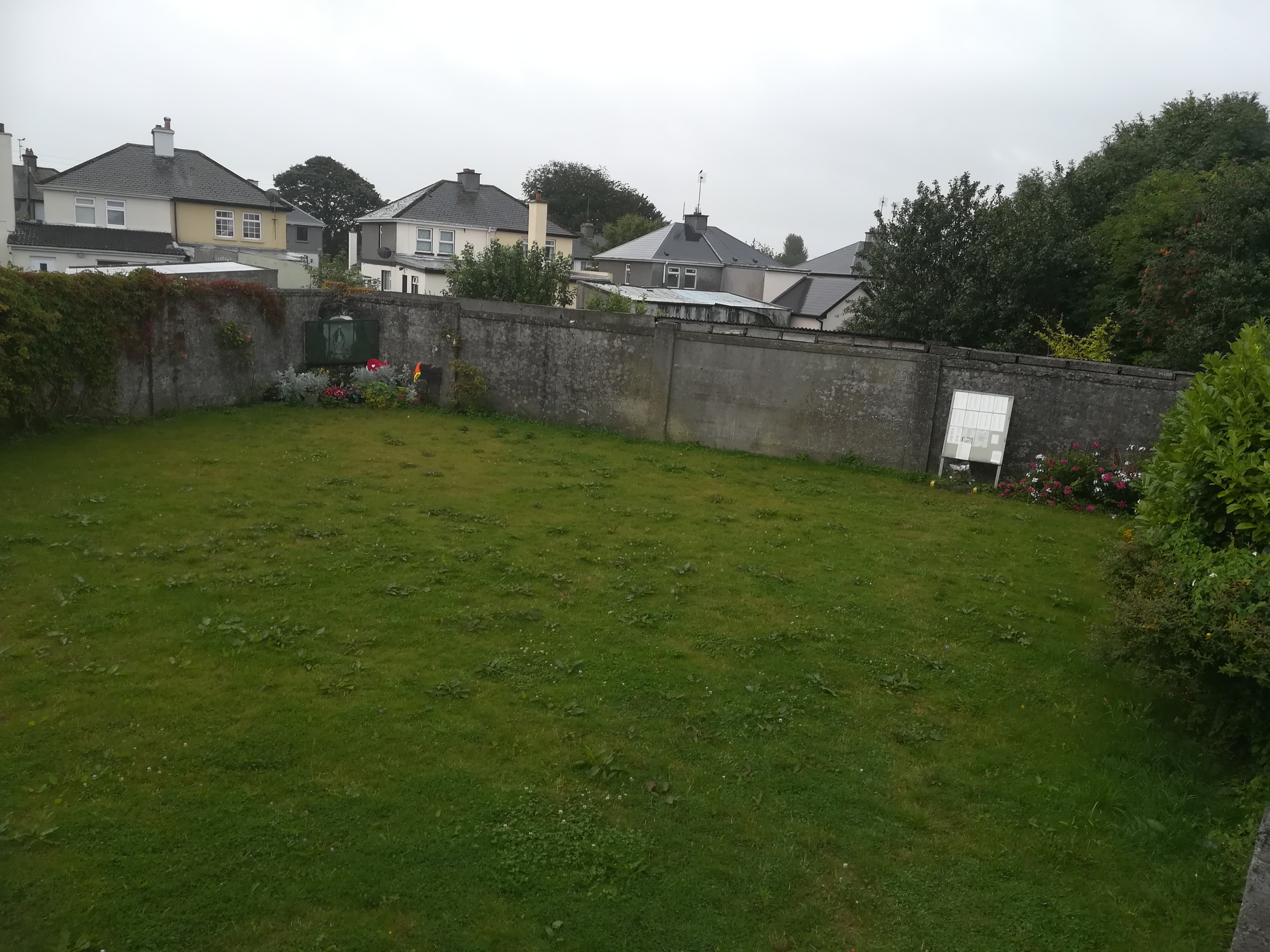
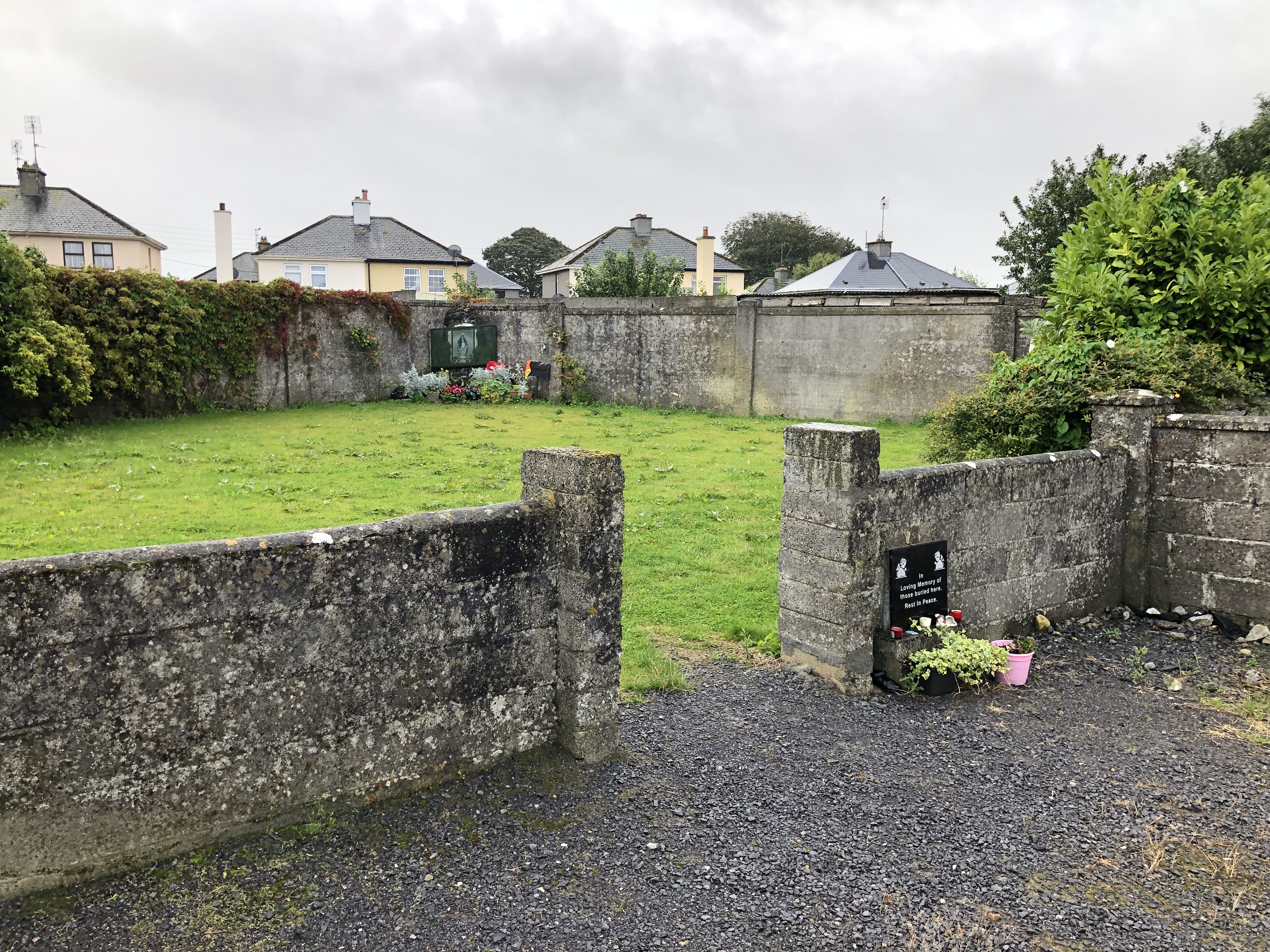
Mass grave at the Bon Secours Mother and Baby Home, Tuam, Galway

The commission was established by the Irish government in the aftermath of extensive worldwide media coverage of an investigation claiming that remains of up to 800 children had been interred in an unmarked mass grave, on the grounds of the Bon Secours Mother and Baby Home in Tuam, County Galway. The most commonly recorded causes of death among the infants were congenital debilities, infectious diseases and malnutrition. O'Reilly's article for the Irish Mail on Sunday said that the bodies were buried in a site at the Home and that there was a high death rate of its residents. Corless' research led her to conclude that that the site was also the location of a septic tank, when overlaid with maps of the period of use as a workhouse.

==== Additional issues ====
On 3 June 2015, the Irish Examiner published a special report which said that the Irish Health Services Executive (HSE) had voiced concerns in 2012 that up to 1,000 children may have been trafficked from the Home, and recommending that the then health minister be informed so that "a fully-fledged, fully resourced forensic investigation and State inquiry" could be launched. The issue had arisen within the HSE when a principal social worker responsible for adoption discovered "a large archive of photographs, documentation and correspondence relating to children sent for adoption to the USA" and "documentation in relation to discharges and admissions to psychiatric institutions in the Western area." The HSE said that there were letters from the Home to parents asking for money for the upkeep of their children and says that the duration of stay for children may have been prolonged by the order for financial reasons. It also uncovered letters to parents asking for money for the upkeep of some children who had already been discharged or had died. The social worker had compiled a list of "up to 1,000 names." HSE reports mentioned the possibility that children had been trafficked for adoption with one speculating that it was possible that death certificates were falsified so children could be "brokered" for adoption.

In May 2018, the Child and Family Agency (Tusla) referred 126 files to the commission regarding births that had been falsely registered by the Saint Patrick's Guild adoption agency. In a press release, Minister Zappone said: "We have known about the practice of incorrect registrations for many years, but it has been extremely difficult to identify and prove in individual cases because of the deliberate failure of those involved to keep records. However, Tusla has found clear evidence in the case of some records previously held by St Patrick's Guild."

== Establishment ==
On 4 June 2014, the Irish government announced it was bringing together representatives from multiple government departments to investigate the deaths at the Bon Secours home and to propose how to address the issue. The Minister for Children and Youth Affairs, Charlie Flanagan, said any government inquiry would not be confined to the home in Tuam and that officials would advise the government on the best form of inquiry before the end of June 2014. On 16 July 2014, the government announced that Judge Yvonne Murphy would chair a Commission of Investigation into Mother and Baby homes, including Tuam. In October 2014, the Minister for Children and Youth Affairs, James Reilly, announced that the draft terms of reference for the inquiry had been circulated to government departments for comment.

On 19 February 2015, Reilly announced that the terms of reference, agreed upon by the cabinet and signed by the Taoiseach as a Government Order at Tuesday's cabinet meeting, established an independent commission, which had a three-year deadline and a budget of approximately €21 million.

The three-person Commission comprised Judge Yvonne Murphy as Chairperson, with an international legal expert on child protection and adoption, Dr William Duncan, and historian Professor Mary E. Daly, appointed as Commissioners.

=== Terms of Reference ===
The terms of reference specified for the commission were to investigate and report on:

1. The circumstances for the entry of single women into Mother and Baby Homes and the exit pathways on leaving, including the extent of their participation in relevant decisions;
2. The living conditions and care arrangements experienced by residents during their period of accommodation, including by reference to the literature on the living conditions and care experienced by mothers and children generally during the period;
3. Mortality among mothers and children residing in the institutions (to determine the general causes, circumstances, and rates of mortality), compared to mortality among women and children generally;
4. Post-mortem practices and procedures in respect of children or mothers who died while resident, including the reporting of deaths, burial arrangements, and transfer of remains to educational institutions for the purpose of the anatomical examination;
5. The extent of compliance with relevant regulatory and ethical standards of the time of systemic vaccine trials found by the Commission to have been conducted on children resident in one or more of the institutions (including, inter alia, vaccine trials conducted using vaccines manufactured by Burroughs Welcome [sic] in 1960/61, 1970 or 1973);
6. Arrangements for the entry of children into the institutions in circumstances when their mother was not also resident at the time of their entry;
7. For children who did not remain in the care of their parents, to examine exit pathways on leaving the institutions so as to establish patterns of the referral or relevant relationships with other entities, and in particular to identify:
  1. the extent to which the child's welfare and protection were considered in practices relating to their placement in Ireland or abroad;
  2. the extent of participation of mothers in relevant decisions, including
    1. the procedures that were in place to obtain consent from mothers in respect of adoption, and
    2. whether these procedures were adequate for the purpose of ensuring such consent was full, free and informed; and
  3. the practices and procedures for placement of children where there was cooperation with another person or persons in arranging this placement, including where an intermediary organisation arranged a subsequent placement;
8. To identify the extent to which any group of residents may have systematically been treated differently on any grounds (religion, race, Traveller identity, or disability).

The investigation covered the period from 1922, the foundation of the state, to 1998.

==== Institutions included ====
The Terms of Reference specified that only 14 named mother and baby homes were to be included within the scope of the investigation. These were:

- Ard Mhuire, Dunboyne, County Meath;
- Belmont (Flatlets), Belmont Ave, Dublin 4;
- Bessborough Mother & Baby Home, Blackrock, Cork;
- Bethany Home, originally Blackhall Place, Dublin 7 and from 1934, Orwell Road, Rathgar, Dublin 6;
- Bon Secours Mother and Baby Home, Tuam, County Galway;
- Denny House, Eglinton Rd, Dublin 4, originally Magdalen Home, 8 Lower Leeson St, Dublin 2;
- Kilrush, Cooraclare Rd, County Clare;
- Manor House, Castlepollard, County Westmeath;
- Ms. Carr's (Flatlets), 16 Northbrook Rd, Dublin 6;
- Regina Coeli Hostel, North Brunswick Street, Dublin 7;
- Sean Ross Abbey, Roscrea, County Tipperary;
- St. Gerard's, originally 39, Mountjoy Square, Dublin 1;
- St Patrick's Mother and Baby Home, Navan Road, Dublin 7, originally known as Pelletstown, and subsequent transfer to Eglinton House, Eglinton Rd, Dublin 4; and
- The Castle, Newtowncunningham, County Donegal.

In addition, a "representative sample" of state-operated County Homes, selected by the commission as fulfilling a function similar to the Mother and Baby Homes, were included. These were:

- St Kevin's Institution (Dublin Union)
- Stranorlar County Home, County Donegal (St Joseph's)
- Cork City County Home (St Finbarr's)
- Thomastown County Home, County Kilkenny (St Columba's)

Several of the named homes – principally Bessborough House (Cork), Bon Secours (Galway), Manor House (Westmeath), Sean Ross Abbey (Tipperary) and St. Patrick's (Dublin) – had previously been highlighted as sources for illegal domestic and foreign adoptions, with many of the children being trafficked to the United States.

=== Methodology ===
In tandem with carrying out the investigations outlined in the Terms of Reference, the commission was also empowered to establish a "Confidential Committee", with the aim of providing a forum for former residents and staff of the named institutions, where they could share accounts of their experiences. Such accounts were to be used to inform relevant investigations, and the Confidential Committee was to publish a report on the accounts received.

The commission also included a literature-based academic social history module, in order to establish an objective and comprehensive historical analysis of significant relevant matters. The commission was authorised to rely on this analysis as evidence to inform its investigations and to assist it in framing its findings and conclusions within the wider social and historical context of the relevant period under investigation.

== Tuam excavation ==
As part of its investigations, the commission ordered excavations of the suspected burial site in Tuam to be carried out. On 3 March 2017, the commission announced that multiple human remains had been found during excavations carried out between November 2016 and February 2017 at the site. Tests conducted on some of the remains indicated they had been aged between 35 foetal weeks and 2–3 years. The announcement confirmed that the deceased died during the period of time that the property was used by the Mother and Baby Home, not from an earlier period, as most of the bodies dated from the 1920s to the 1950s. The remains were found in an "underground structure divided into 20 chambers." The commission said "it had not yet determined what the purpose of this structure was but it appeared to be a sewage tank. The commission had also not yet determined if it was ever used for this purpose."

The commission stated that it was continuing its investigation into who was responsible for the disposal of human remains in this way, and that it had notified the coroner.

=== Reactions to excavation find ===
In 2017 Minister for Children and Youth Affairs Katherine Zappone said that the coroner's results would determine the direction of the investigation and that the commission would determine whether other sites needed to be excavated, including another part of the Tuam site.

The Adoption Rights Alliance and Justice for Magdalenes Research campaign groups demanded that Zappone publish a five-month-old report from the commission on the issue of broadening the probe's terms of reference beyond the original 18 institutions included, and said the state must ensure that all human remains buried in unmarked graves at institutions in Ireland are identified. (The report was published in April 2017; the delay, according to the Department of Children and Youth Affairs, was due to the report being referred to the Attorney General for advice on the report's recommendations on the issue of redress.)

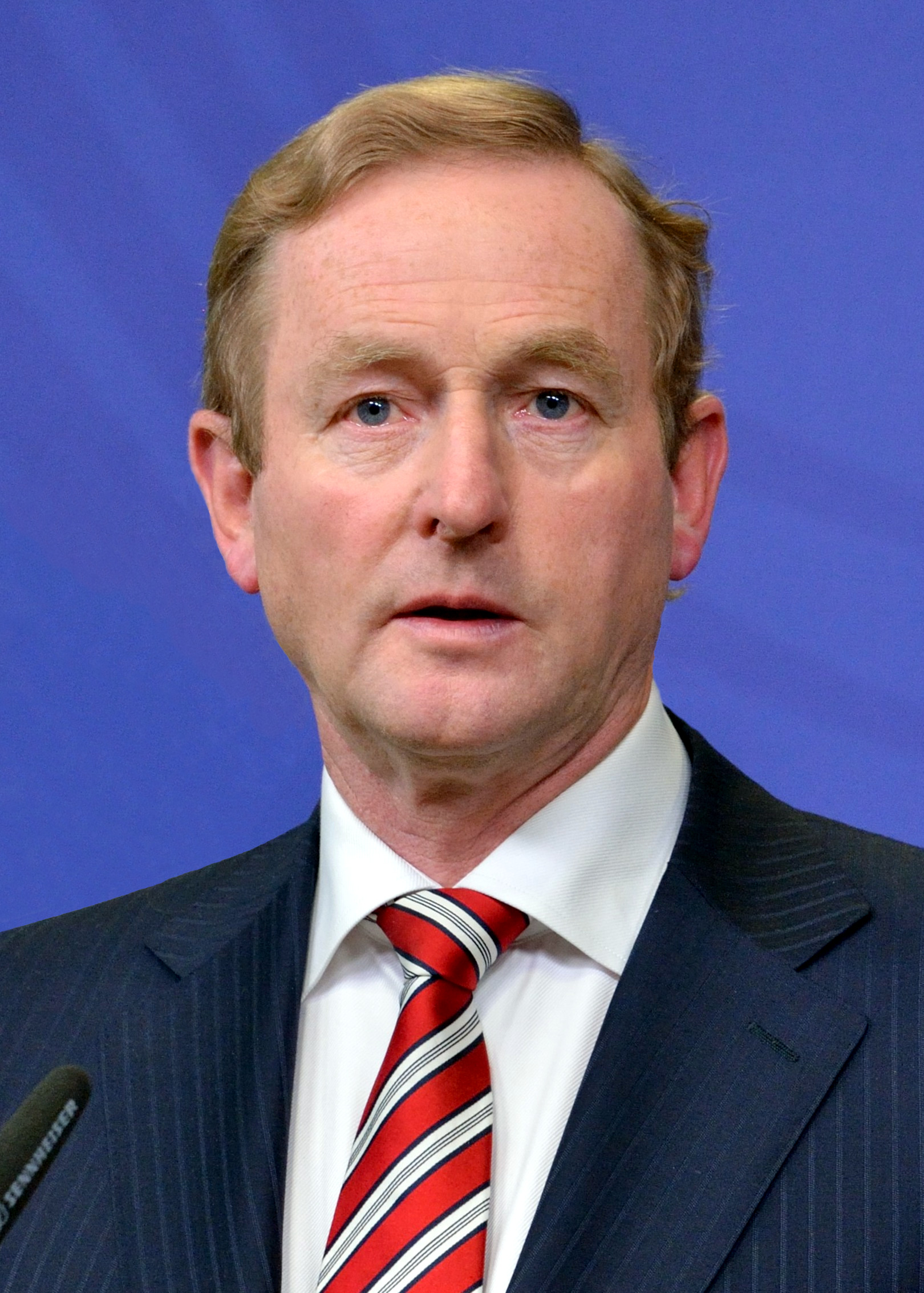
Taoiseach Enda Kenny

Taoiseach Enda Kenny described the find as "truly appalling", saying "the babies of single mothers involved had been treated like some kind of sub-species." He commended the work of Catherine Corless in bringing the issue to light. Speaking on the find in Dáil Éireann, in response to requests to widen the terms of reference of the commission, he described the Mother and Baby Home as "a chamber of horrors."

No nuns broke into our homes to kidnap our children. We gave them up to what we convinced ourselves was the nuns' care. We gave them up maybe to spare them the savagery of gossip, the wink and the elbow language of delight in which the holier than thous were particularly fluent. We gave them up because of our perverse, in fact, morbid relationship with what is called respectability. Indeed, for a while, it seemed as if in Ireland our women had the amazing capacity to self-impregnate. For their trouble, we took their babies and gifted them, sold them, trafficked them, starved them, neglected them, or denied them to the point of their disappearance from our hearts, our sight, our country and, in the case of Tuam and possibly other places, from life itself.

— Enda Kenny

In the same debate, Bríd Smith, AAA-PBP TD, called for the Bon Secours order of nuns to be disbanded. She said, "its hospital empire, the biggest private hospital group in the State, was built on the bones of the dead Tuam babies". Smith said "everyone was not responsible for what happened in Tuam. It was paid for by the state, which knew exactly what was going on, and there were 'headage payments' of up to US$3,000 for each child sent to the United States." The Taoiseach's speech was criticised in the Dáil, when Catherine Connolly directly addressed the speech, stating:

A shocking discovery, according to everyone, and particularly to yourself Taoiseach. But this is something that Galway has been aware of for a long time, highlighted by Catherine Corless back in 2014, in her painstaking and self-funded research. By the witnesses, the many, many women who went before the commission of inquiry into child abuse which culminated in the Ryan Report, as far back as 2009. They told their stories about their experience in Mother and Baby Homes. It was brought to the attention of Martin McAleese when he concluded his report on the Magdalene laundries. So none of this is shocking to the survivors. What is shocking to the survivors, and to me, is the carefully crafted words that you've come into the chamber with. And, in particular, that you say 'no nuns broke into our homes to kidnap our children', 'we gave them up to what we convinced ourselves was the nuns' care' and so on. I don't doubt your bona fides, a Thaoisigh, but I certainly doubt your judgement in reading that out, a carefully crafted speech with a sentence like that in these circumstances. My question: please answer. Where is the interim report that has sat with the minister since September last year? Please confirm that the site will be sealed off as any crime scene is sealed off.

— Catherine Connolly

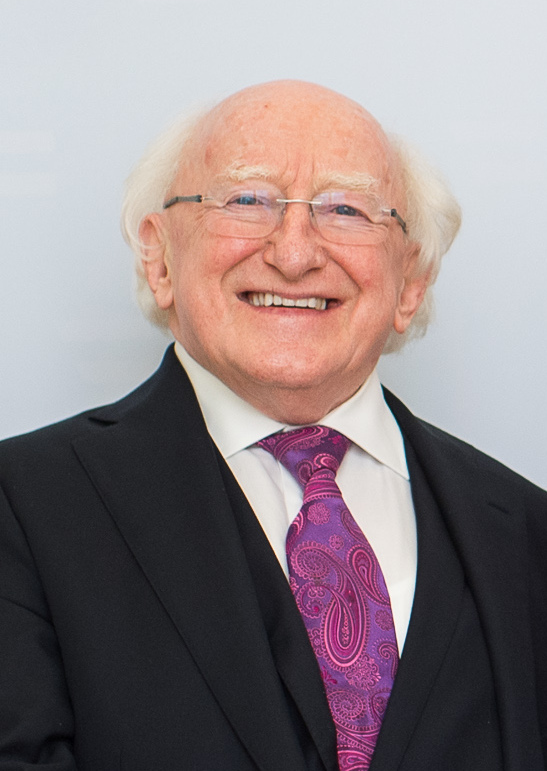
President of Ireland, Michael D. Higgins

Leader of Fianna Fáil, Micheál Martin T.D., called for a state apology for the infants, a commemoration to be held for them, and for the expansion of the commission of Inquiry to include other institutions and sites. The Minister for Justice, Frances Fitzgerald, stated that "the discovery is an infinitely sad reminder of an Ireland that was a very harsh, harsh place for women and their babies" and that "it shows the tortured relationship the State and church had with pregnant women—it is a tragedy that we are now facing in its entirety." The President of Ireland, Michael D. Higgins, speaking about the find at an International Women's Day reception, said there "are dark shadows that hang over our meeting, shadows that require us all to summon up yet again a light that might dispel the darkness to which so many women and their children were condemned, and the questions left unanswered as we moved on." President Higgins described Catherine Corless' work as "another necessary step in blowing open the locked doors of a hidden Ireland."

The Catholic Archbishop of Tuam, Michael Neary, said that he was horrified by the confirmation that significant quantities of human remains were buried on the site of a former mother and baby home in the town. Describing the news as "a body blow", he said he had been "greatly shocked to learn of the scale of the practice during the time in which the Bon Secours ran the mother and baby home in Tuam." The Irish Catholic Bishops' Conference apologised for the hurt caused by its part in the system, which they said also involved adoptions. They also urged parishes to ensure that the burial sites of former residents were appropriately marked, and said that "the appalling story of life, death and adoptions related to the Mother and Baby Homes has shocked everyone in Ireland and beyond."

Both TV3 and RTÉ broadcast documentaries on the scandal, with the latter's Claire Byrne Live including a segment listing the names of all 796 children who had died at the home. Catherine Corless appeared on The Late Late Show on 10 March 2017, receiving a standing ovation at the end of the segment. Host Ryan Tubridy said "If that audience represents the people watching tonight, there is a hunger in this country for the truth."

==== Investigation team ====
In June 2017, Minister Zappone announced the appointment of a team of international experts, comprising an Irish-based forensic archaeologist, a US-based forensic anthropologist and a UK-based forensic scientist, to investigate the burial site. Zappone also said that she was considering broadening the terms of reference for the commission, in order to "help to answer some of the questions which have been raised again in public debate." The team is led by Dr. Niamh McCullagh, who previously worked with the Independent Commission for the Location of Victims' Remains in Northern Ireland and the Joint Prisoner of War/Missing in Action Command that aimed to locate the bodies of war dead.

Zappone stated that McCullagh will identify options for the government, looking at the possibility of exhuming the remains and identifying if there are any further remains on the site that have yet to be discovered. The team is due to complete its final report in September 2017.

In July 2017, the team conducted an extensive geophysical survey on the site. This consisted of data collection through a variety of non-invasive techniques, over the course of 5 days. The team liaised with the Coroner for North Galway, the Garda Síochána, the National Monuments Services and Forensic Science Ireland, and advice was received from the International Committee for the Red Cross.

When Pope Francis visited Ireland in August 2018, Zappone raised the issue of the Tuam home in a meeting with him, and told him "I hope the Church will make reparation for its part in this shameful chapter,"

In October 2018 Zappone announced that the remains of children buried in unmarked graves were to be exhumed, identified forensically, and reburied respectfully. The operation would not be straightforward, and presented "unprecedented technical and legal issues".

== Criticisms during lifetime of the commission ==
The scope of the Investigation and in particular its restriction to just a limited number of named homes has been criticised by, among others, the United Nations Committee on the Elimination of Discrimination Against Women (CEDAW). In a 2017 report, it stated that the Commission of Investigation "is narrow such that it does not cover all homes and analogous institutions [and] therefore may not address the whole spectrum of abuses perpetrated against women and girls."

The committee therefore urges the State party to conduct prompt, independent and thorough investigations, in line with international human rights standards, into all allegations of abuse in Magdalene laundries, children's institutions, Mother and Baby homes, and symphysiotomy in order to prosecute and punish the perpetrators of those involved in violations of women's rights. All victims/survivors of such abuse obtain an effective remedy including appropriate compensation, official apologies, restitution, satisfaction and rehabilitative services.

— UN CEDAW

The delay in publishing a final report and the fact that redress for victims of the homes was not considered until the final report was published, received criticism from the survivors, including the Coalition of Mother and Baby Home Survivors (CMABS). Paul Redmond, the chairperson of CMABS, said that many survivors are now elderly and have already died since the revelations about Tuam first emerged, and that "This is yet another delaying tactic by the Government to deny survivors truth and justice. The current inquiry is already too limited and excludes many survivors and this delay will now ensure that thousands more survivors are denied justice by death." Survivor Mary Teresa Collins and her daughter Laura Angela Collins, chairwoman of Justice 4 All Women & Children, supported Redmond's position saying that "the government is stalling."

== Reports ==
=== Commission reports ===
The commission was originally due to issue a final report by February 2018, but was given a one-year extension in December 2017. The report may include recommendations, including recommendations relating to "relevant matters that it considers may warrant further investigation in the public interest." The committee had been due to issue an interim report in 2016, but when published it consisted solely of a request for a time extension to 2018 due to the large number applications to make submissions to the Confidential Committee.

A second interim report was issued to the Minister in September 2016 and was published in April 2017. The delay, according to the Department of Children and Youth Affairs, was due to the report being referred to the Attorney General for advice on the report's recommendations on the issue of redress.

A third interim report was published in December 2017. Commenting on the report and announcing the time extension for its final report, Minister Zappone said:

When I recently met with the Commission I was again reassured by their absolute commitment to establish the full facts of what happened to women and children in these institutions. It is important that we do not underestimate the complexity of this task and we must not compromise the process of establishing the truth by leaving any stone uncovered or taking any shortcuts.

— Katherine Zappone

The third interim report revealed that legal discovery orders relating to the records of Catholic religious congregations, which ran most of the homes, had been issued, but the commission stated that "some have very little material available while others have provided extensive material". Government Departments, local authorities and the HSE were also issued with discovery orders.

The issues raised in the commission's third interim report included:

- The time-consuming nature of investigations, in particular, establishing the burial practices at the Bon Secours Mother and Baby Home in Tuam, and the electronic scanning of records by Túsla, the Child and Family Agency;
- What were described as "significant gaps" in the records of various health authorities with regard to institutions previously under their remit, necessitating further searches. This was exacerbated by sometimes multiple transfers of responsibility over the years, from local authorities/Board of Guardians/Boards of Public Assistance, to Health Boards, then to the HSE and, in some cases, to the Child and Family Agency.
- Significant gaps in relation to the burial records of babies who died in the institutions under investigation;
- The commission also stated that it had recorded testimony from 140 former residents, staff and representatives of those who had run the institutions, but more time was needed to gather and examine documentary evidence.

In all, five interim reports were published.

=== Departmental reports ===
In July 2017, Minister Zappone announced that in addition to the commission progressing its independent investigations, the Department of Children and Youth Affairs would separately report each month on the measures being progressed across Government to respond to the issues which have emerged so far from the work of the commission.

The first such monthly report was published on 7 July 2017. The second report was published on 4 August 2017. The third report was published on 1 September 2017, and announced that the Expert Technical Group was working with, among others, the Argentine Forensic Anthropology Team, who are world leaders in humanitarian forensic action and proficient in community engagement.

In total, these reports indicated that these homes housed 56,000 women, as young as 12 years old, and witnessed birth of some 57,000 babies; 15% of the mothers and/or babies died as a result of malnutrition or preventable illness. Surviving mothers were often separated from their babies, who were put up for adoption without maternal consent. Several of the homes were found to have conducted vaccination trials on the mothers and babies.

==== Expert Technical Group report ====
In December 2017, the Expert Technical Group reported to the Department of Children and Youth Affairs, outlining five possible courses of action on the Tuam site. These are:

- "Memorialisation: No further investigative work; return the site to being managed as a memorial; make site safe for public access."
- "Exhume known human remains: Recover human remains interred in the chambered structure identified to date and reinter elsewhere; no further forensic analysis of remains."
- "Forensic excavation and recovery of known human remains: Complete forensic archaeological excavation, recovery and analysis of human remains from the chambers identified to date."
- "Forensic excavation and recovery, and further evaluation/ excavation of other areas of potential burial/ interest: Complete forensic excavation and recovery of all human remains in memorial garden and any other targeted area, following geophysical survey, assessment of witness statements, historical records, etc."
- "Forensic excavation of total available area: Full forensic and archaeological excavation of all available ground formerly occupied by the M&B Home. A total of 0.4 hectares, comprising memorial garden, playground, car park etc. Excludes private built areas (houses and gardens etc. subsequently built on the former site)."

Zappone said that before any decision was taken, she first wanted to consult with the Tuam community and other affected parties, such as relatives of those who were resident in the home. She said the consultation process, which would be undertaken by Galway County Council, would take three months. A report was published in April 2018, by Galway County Council based on qualitative and quantitative research conducted by Barbara Walshe and Catherine O'Connell. The Tuam Home Survivors Network said its members had given careful consideration to the Expert Technical Group's report and that the only appropriate action was "a complete excavation of the Tuam site to ensure the recovery of all human remains contained there." The Network were also seeking a postmortem for each set of human remains and cataloguing of DNA from all remains in order to create the most complete database possible.

The Technical Group also identified a number of human rights issues which were outside its terms of reference. Zappone appointed human rights expert and Special Rapporteur on Child Protection, Doctor Geoffrey Shannon, to examine these issues and to report to her on his findings.

==== Shannon report on the collection of survivors' DNA ====
Doctor Shannon's report on the collection of Tuam survivors' DNA was published on 11 September 2019. The report recommended the establishment of a voluntary scheme to collect DNA from survivors and relatives of Tuam, with their informed consent, in order to match DNA to be collected from the remains of the dead. The voluntary scheme would be run on an administrative basis, with no DNA profiling to occur until legislation was in place to underpin the excavation and exhumation of remains and permit their DNA testing, where this proved to be possible.

=== Final Commission report ===
The final report of the commission was submitted to Roderic O'Gorman, the Minister for Children, Equality, Disability, Integration and Youth on 30 October 2020, and was published on 12 January 2021.

The final report is some 3,000 pages in length, including 1,000 pages of survivor testimony and an 'executive summary' of 200 pages. It was due to be given to survivors prior to publication, but was leaked to the Irish Independent newspaper on the weekend before, which drew strong criticism from the Minister involved, Roderic O'Gorman.

==== Findings of final report ====
===== Deaths =====
The report detailed an "appalling level of infant mortality at mother-and-baby homes," and said "in the years before 1960 mother-and-baby homes did not save the lives of 'illegitimate' children; in fact, they appear to have significantly reduced their prospects of survival." It detailed that around 9,000 children, one in seven of those born in the 18 institutions covered by the commission's terms of reference, had died in them between 1922 and 1998, double the rate of infant mortality in the general population.

===== Medical experiments =====
The report confirmed that children had been subject to medical experiments, being used in vaccine trials without parental or guardian consent. All were carried out by either the Wellcome Foundation or Glaxo Laboratories, which have since merged to form the GlaxoSmithKline pharmaceutical company.

The trials detailed in the report include:

- 1930 Trial of Wellcome anti-diphtheria vaccine on 142 children in two unidentified orphanages and to 436 children aged between eight months and 14 years among the general child population in Cork city.
- 1934 Trial of Wellcome anti-diphtheria vaccine on 24 children, varying in age from seven months to 14 years, resident in the Dublin Union, later known as St Pat's.
- 1934–1936 Trial of Wellcome 'one-shot' anti-diphtheria vaccine to 250 children in an unidentified residential institution for boys and to 2,541 children among the general population in County Cork.
- 1935 Trial of Wellcome vaccine on 46 children, aged four to 15 years, resident in St Vincent's Industrial School, Goldenbridge, St Joseph's School for Deaf Boys, Cabra, and St Saviour's Orphanage, Lower Dominick Street, Dublin.
- 1935 Trial of Wellcome anti-diphtheria vaccine in children's residential institutions in Tipperary, likely the three industrial schools in Tipperary South: St Bernard's Industrial School, Fethard; St Francis's Industrial School, Cashel; and St Joseph's Industrial School, Ferryhouse, Clonmel.
- 1960–1961 Trial of Wellcome Quadruple (4 in 1) vaccine "Quadrivax" on 58 infants and children resident in a number of institutions, including Bessborough, St Patrick's Home, Navan Road; Dunboyne; Castlepollard; St Clare's Home, Stamullen and Mount Carmel Industrial School, Moate.
- 1964 Trial of Wellcome "Wellcovax" measles vaccine on 12 children living in Sean Ross.
- 1964–1965 Trial of Glaxo Laboratories "Mevilin-L" measles vaccine on children living in Bessborough and St Patrick's, Navan Road.
- 1965 Trial of Glaxo Laboratories Quintuple (5 in 1) vaccine on children Bessborough and St Patrick's, Navan Road.
- 1968–1969 Trial of Glaxo Laboratories 'Mevilin-L' measles vaccine on at least 30 children resident in St Patrick's, Navan Road.
- 1968–1969 Trials of experimental replacement formula milk took place in St Patrick's Navan Road), and Bessborough.
- 1970 Trial of Wellcome's Rubella vaccine on 72 children living in the general community and 69 children aged between two and 18 years old "resident in an orphanage in a suburb of Dublin".
- 1973 Trial of Wellcome's modified DTP vaccine on 65 children in the general community and 53 children resident in St Patrick's, Navan Road, and in three residential children's homes.

The commission found that the trials in seven institutions it investigated were "illegal and unethical even by the standards of the time", that trials had proceeded without being licensed, that regulatory standards had not been upheld. The report states that the trials would have been a basic breach of the Nuremberg Code, and that no consents had been obtained for children in institutions. The report's statement that there was "no evidence of injury to the children involved as a result of the vaccines" has been disputed by survivors, who point out that they were never contacted again by the companies or scientists involved following their adoptions, and that their adoptive parents had never been aware that they had been used in the trials.

===== Racism =====
The report details that 275 children were born in or passed through the mother and baby homes under investigation. The report states that was "no evidence of discrimination" in relation to how adoptions were decided upon, nor in the testimonies of some mixed-race people who had spoken to the commission. This is disputed by the Association of Mixed Race Irish (AMRI) and Bryan Fanning, professor of migration and social policy at University College Dublin.

A spokesperson for AMRI, Conrad Bryan, said:

On the one hand to say there was no evidence of discrimination and then to continue on and say race was taken into account in placing children—that's a very confused inconclusive statement. It just appears that the testimony we've given has basically not been believed. They relied primarily on records they discovered and checked. However, a lot of the testimony can be seen in the report and people can read and make their own judgements on it and see the extent of the racism. The commission says itself there was casual and unthinking racism, even negative bias, so they're clearly showing that racism existed. I was in Pelletstown during the 1960s and the report says virtually 100% of illegitimate children were adopted. Of the majority of the mixed-race children in Pelletstown, only 48% were adopted. Now if that isn't racism, can somebody explain to me what is racism?

== Reactions to Commission's final report ==
The release of the final report generated huge media interest, in Ireland and abroad. The state broadcaster, RTÉ, published over 40 news articles on the topic in the days following release.

=== Criticism of church and state ===
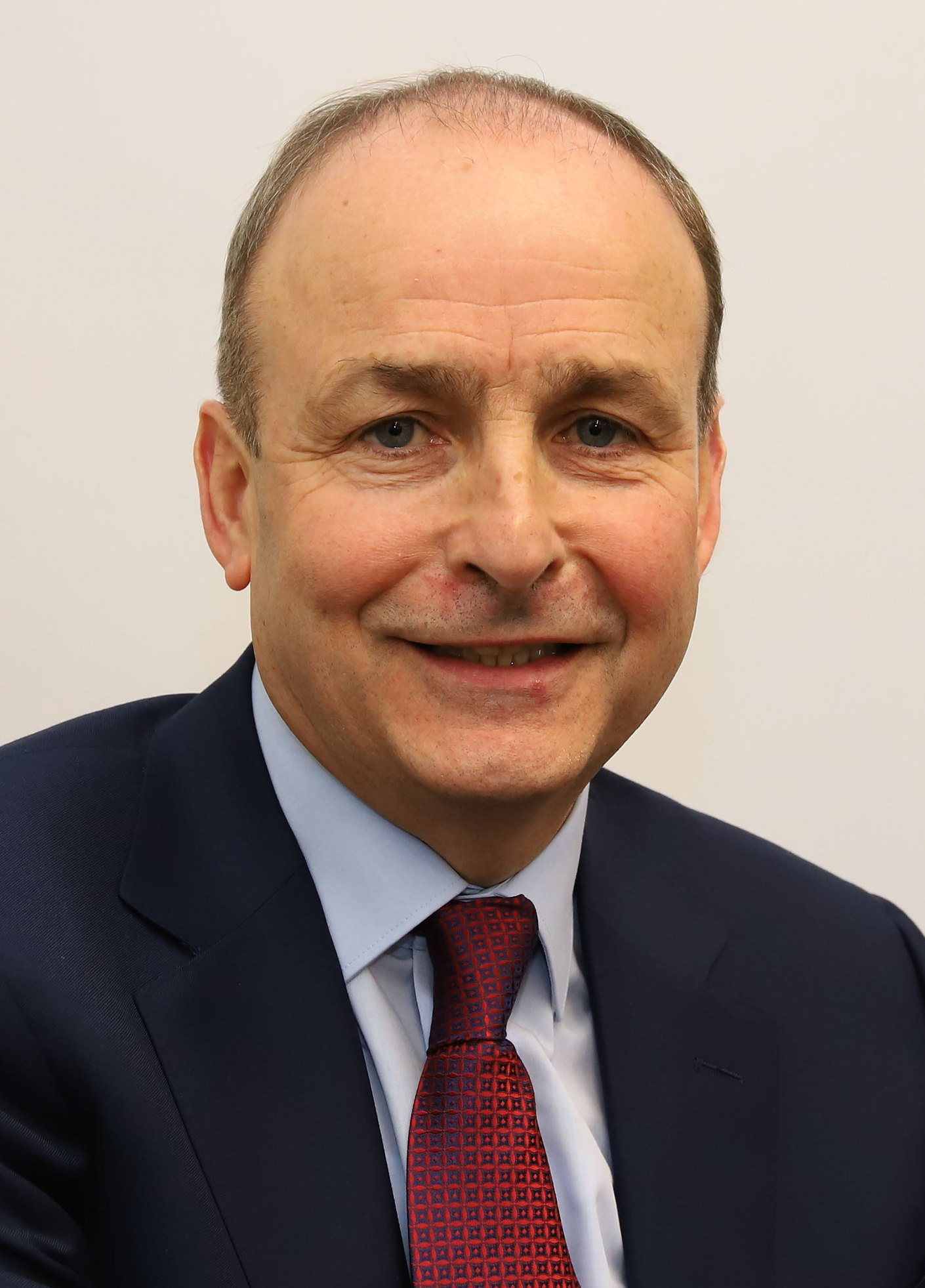
Taoiseach Micheál Martin

Taoiseach Micheál Martin, in his formal state apology, described Ireland’s historic treatment of unmarried mothers as a "profound generational wrong". He spoke of a "warped attitude to sexuality and intimacy", where piety was honoured, yet basic kindness was denied. He admitted that young mothers and their children had paid a "terrible price" for societal dysfunction. The Taoiseach also promised that the apology would be followed by actions, including access to counselling and records, provision of medical cards, and a system of reparations. He finished by saying:

And so, on behalf of the Government, the State and its citizens, I apologise for the profound generational wrong visited upon Irish mothers and their children who ended up in a Mother and Baby Home or a County Home. As the commission says plainly — "they should not have been there".

— Micheál Martin, Taoiseach, (Full text available at reference source.)

President Michael D. Higgins echoed this sentiment, calling the report a reminder of how far Ireland fell short of its republican ideals. He emphasised that both Church and State bore "heavy responsibility" for the violation of basic rights over decades. His comprehensive statement praised the work of Catherine Corless and others in bringing issues to light and urging investigation.

Survivors and their advocates were also critical. The Tuam Survivors Network pushed back on the notion that society as a whole was to blame, arguing that both the State and Church were institutions run by men who lacked compassion. The Coalition of Mother and Baby Home Survivors went further, describing the treatment of mothers and children as "downright criminal." They cited forced labour, abuse, and medical neglect, calling the abuses clear breaches of human rights, asserting that "women were made to scrub floors and stairs and treated as slave labour and were also treated appallingly while in childbirth by denial of doctors, medical equipment and painkilling drugs."

=== Criticism of the commission's conclusions ===
Significant criticism was directed at how the commission interpreted survivor testimony and framed its conclusions, with Leas-Cheann Comhairle of Dáil Éireann Catherine Connolly describing the report's conclusions as "extraordinary" and disconnected from the lived experience of those who came forward. She pointed to the commission's claim that there was no evidence of women being forced into the homes - a conclusion she found incomprehensible, given the stories shared. She also noted the report's failure to adequately acknowledge sexual abuse, rape, and forced adoption, saying that this was contradicted by witness testimony. Roderic O'Gorman, the minister for children, equality, disability, integration and youth and the official to whom the report was presented similarly questioned the commission's approach, particularly what he called its narrow, legalistic view of consent. He argued that in many cases, women had been left with "absolutely no choice." He declined to endorse how the commission had conducted its inquiries. O'Gorman committed to a GDPR-compliant approach to new adoption information and tracing legislation, which he promised would be enacted by the end of 2021, and to the establishment of a redress scheme. The project was stated in August 2022 to have been abandoned.

Catherine Corless, whose work led to the setting up of the commission, said that she was disappointed with aspects of the report, saying it was "vague" about illegal adoption. She said survivors were still waiting for meaningful acknowledgment from the institutions responsible. She called for actions to back up the state apology.

Multiple advocacy groups described the report as incomplete. The Irish First Mothers Group accused the inquiry of absolving Church and State of systemic responsibility. Irish Traveller survivor Mary Teresa Collins, who was interviewed by the commission, said the state apology is meaningless to her and other survivors.

The commission was criticised by survivors and Oireachtas members for twice refusing to appear before the Oireachtas Children's Committee in order to give a briefing and answer questions on the final report. This criticism was revisited and repeated in June 2021, when it emerged that members of the commission were presenting at an academic seminar in Oxford University, on the work of the commission. The Tánaiste, Leo Varadkar, describing it as "disrespectful."

Many survivors criticised the report, in particular for concluding that there was a lack of evidence of forced adoption and abuse, despite testimonies contradicting this, and it was confirmed that the Investigative Committee was given more weight than testimony presented to the Confidential Committee. Some survivors said that their testimonies were amended or misrepresented. Later in June, the former Commission members again refused to appear before the Children's Committee, provoking further criticism from survivors and committee members. Some survivors and members of Oireachtas called on the Minister to repudiate the report. Catherine Corless described the commission's response "an eye-opener" and said the process of gathering and recording witness testimony had turned out to be a "complete waste of survivors' time."

=== Apologies, acknowledgements and redress ===
Despite criticisms of the report, the publication did trigger long-awaited public apologies from both the government and religious orders. In addition to the full apology in the Dáil from Taoiseach Micheál Martin, he also pledged a programme of supports for survivors, including access to counselling, medical cards, and personal records, along with a planned system of reparations.

Several religious orders that had operated mother and baby homes also released statements. The Bon Secours Sisters, who ran the Tuam home, acknowledged their failure to uphold basic human dignity and compassion. Their statement admitted to the disrespectful burial of children on the premises but pledged participation in a forthcoming restorative recognition scheme. The Daughters of Charity, who operated Saint Patrick's Mother and Baby Home (also known as Pelletstown) in Dublin, expressed deep regret for not doing more to support women, many of whom were abandoned by their families and wider society. They welcomed the report and voiced hope that Ireland had changed permanently. The Sisters of the Sacred Hearts of Jesus and Mary ran Bessborough House in Cork. This institution had a particularly high infant mortality rate and current controversy surrounds the location of burials of children on the grounds and the order's plans to have the lands developed. The order apologised for the particularly high infant mortality at their institution and expressed sorrow over the lack of clarity surrounding the burial locations of many children. They stated that they had worked with a professional historian to help the commission investigate this issue, though they acknowledged the difficulty in achieving legal certainty.

== Aftermath of the final report ==
=== Restorative recognition and action plan ===
In the aftermath of the publication of the commission's final report, in November 2021, the government announced that it was to introduce a series of measures to address the issues raised and the resulting calls for justice. These included:

- The enactment of legislation to allow the release of birth information to adopted people; this became the Birth Information and Tracing Act, 2022.
- The establishment of a "National Centre for Research and Remembrance", to be built on the grounds of a former Magdalene Laundry in Sean McDermott Street, Dublin.
- Restorative recognition, in the form of:
  - access to counselling and medical services, and
  - a payment scheme, to offer compensation to those who had been in Mother and Baby Homes.
- Dignified burial, with legislation being introduced to allow for the exhumation, identification (where possible) and reburial of remains.

While most aspects of the action plan were welcomed, the payment scheme was heavily criticised by survivors' groups for only including those who had been in a Mother and Baby Home for longer than six months, and then only if they had been in certain named homes - the scheme does not cover all of them. The Irish Council for Civil Liberties claimed that over 40% of survivors would be excluded.

=== Criticisms ===
Following publication of the final report, survivors sought access to their own records by making subject access requests (SARs) to the Department of Health. This resulted in forms used by the commission to compile their report from witness testimony being shown to be unfit for purpose, according to survivors and their families. The daughter of one survivor said that it was "incomprehensible that options such as rape, incest, extra-marital and casual encounter are included under 'current relationship status' without anyone saying this is an issue. Also, it shows they never expected this to get into the public domain. In what world is rape or incest a relationship status?"

Some of those who received access to their records claim that material on their file was forged. For example, one survivor was given a letter from her file, in June 2021, that was purportedly written by her, thanking Ard Mhuire Mother and Baby Home for their help. She denies ever writing such a letter, and points out phrasing in the letter she would never have used.

In July 2021, it was announced that two test judicial review cases were being taken by Mother and Baby Home survivors Philomena Lee and Mary Harney. Their cases seek to quash elements of the commission's final report, with Lee's court submission stating "numerous findings of the Commission in its final report which are at odds with the testimony of [Lee] provided on affidavit to the Commission." The commission did not provide Lee with a draft or extract, as required by section 34 of the Commissions of Investigation Act 2004. A third case taken by Mari Steed sought to quash that part of the commission's finding that there was no evidence any child was harmed by vaccine trials carried out at the institutions. The cases were heard in late 2021. On 17 December 2021, the High Court issued its judgement, declaring that the Commission of Investigation had treated survivors unlawfully.

=== Alternative report ===
In the aftermath of the publication of the commission's final report, ongoing media commentary focused on the discrepancies between the findings in the report's executive summary and actual witness testimony that directly contradicts those findings.

The discrepancies led to calls for the report to be repudiated by the government. One such call was made by Caitríona Crowe, former head of special projects at the National Archives of Ireland, who said "[The report's] conclusions are disputed, not just by survivors, but by many commentators who do not share the commission's view that Church and State were not the primary movers and operators of this vast system of incarceration and family separation. The repudiation of these findings would not be seen by most as a loss; on the contrary, many survivors view their rejection, as the State's official view of what happened to them, to be essential."

In July 2021, a group of 25 researchers and academics announced that over the months since the publication of the original report, they had established a project to explore whether the commission could have come to different findings, using the evidence available to it. They concluded that the commission had sufficient evidence before it to find multiple abuses of key human rights provisions. Their "alternative report" was published on 15 July 2021.

== See also ==
- Ferns Report
- Industrial school
- Magdalene asylum
- Murphy Report
- St Joseph's Industrial School, Letterfrack
