= Mary E. Daly =

Irish historian and academic

- Born: Mary Elizabeth Daly
- Education: University College Dublin
- Occupation: Historian

Mary Elizabeth Daly, MRIA is an Irish historian and academic. She is Professor Emerita of Modern Irish History at University College Dublin. From 2014 to 2017, she served as the President of the Royal Irish Academy.

== Academic career ==
Daly studied history and economics at University College Dublin (UCD), graduating in 1969 with a Bachelor of Arts (BA) degree. She remained at UCD to attain a Master of Arts (MA) degree in history, which she completed in 1971. She undertook postgraduate studies at the University of Oxford, completing her Doctor of Philosophy (DPhil) degree in 1978. Her doctoral thesis was titled "Government Policy and the Depressed Areas in the Inter-War Years".

Since 1970, Daly has held teaching and research positions within University College Dublin. She was promoted to Professor of Modern Irish History in 2006.

Since 2008, Daly has been the deputy chair of Higher Education Authority. She has been a Commissioner of the Mother and Baby Homes Commission of Investigation since its establishment in 2015. From 2014 to 2017, she served as the President of the Royal Irish Academy, the first woman to hold this role.

== Honours ==
In 1991, Daly was elected a Member of the Royal Irish Academy (MRIA). In May 2021 Daly was awarded the Academy Gold Medal in the Humanities.

== Selected works ==
- Daly, Mary E. (1984). Dublin, the deposed capital: a social and economic history, 1860–1914. Cork: Cork University Press. ISBN 978-0902561274.
- Daly, Mary E. (1986). The famine in Ireland. Dublin: Dundalgan Press. ISBN 978-0852211083.
- Daly, Mary E. (1992). Industrial Development and Irish National Identity, 1922–1939. Syracuse, NY: Syracuse University Press. ISBN 978-0815625612.
- Daly, Mary E. (2006). The Slow Failure: Population Decline and Independent Ireland, 1920–1973. Madison, WI: University of Wisconsin Press. ISBN 978-0299212902.
