= Magdalene laundries in Ireland =

Predominantly Roman Catholic institutions

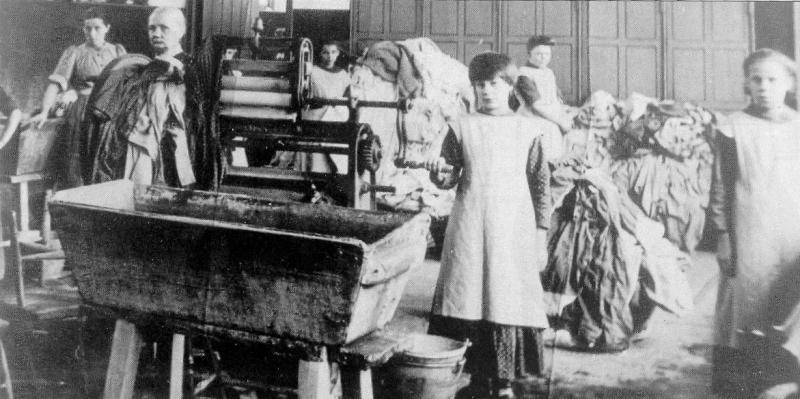
Irish Magdalene laundry, c. early 20th century

The Magdalene laundries in Ireland, also known as Magdalene asylums, were institutions run by a broad range of Protestant and Catholic individuals and groups. Over the years they came to be run primarily by Roman Catholic orders, and operated from the 18th to the late 20th century. They were run ostensibly to house "fallen women", an estimated 30,000 of whom were confined in these institutions in Ireland. They functioned as penitentiary workhouses in which women did laundry for income for the religious individuals and groups who ran them.

In 1993, unmarked graves of 155 women were uncovered in the convent grounds of one of the laundries. This led to media revelations about the operations of the secretive institutions. A formal state apology was issued in 2014, and a compensation scheme for survivors was set up by the Irish Government, which by 2022 and after an extension of the scheme had paid out €32.8 million to 814 survivors. The religious orders and churches which operated the laundries have rejected appeals, including from victims and Ireland's Justice Minister, to contribute financially to this programme.

== History ==
The Dublin Magdalen Asylum, sometimes called the Magdalen Asylum for Penitent Females, at 8 Lower Leeson Street was the first such institution in Ireland. It was run by the Church of Ireland and accepted only Protestant women. It was founded in 1765 by Lady Arabella Denny. In 1959 it moved to Eglinton Road, Donnybrook and in 1980 changed its name to Denny House. It closed in 1994 and having changed its purpose before the foundation of the State was "Ireland's longest serving Mother and Baby Home" while also the longest running institution to be a laundry.

There were many Protestant-run laundries, particularly around Dublin where up to 12 were in operation for various periods through the 19th and 20th century, exceeding the number of Catholic laundries that would later come to be investigated across Ireland in the McAleese Report. All would close, merge or change their purpose to a Mother and Baby Home before the foundation of the State in 1922.

Ireland's Catholic-run Magdalene asylums survived the longest, through to 1996. Ireland's Magdalene laundries were quietly supported by the state, and operated by religious communities for more than two hundred years. On laundries, James Smith asserts that the "Irish variety took on a distinct character". Inmates were required to work, primarily in laundries, since the facilities were self-supporting. Andrea Parrot and Nina Cummings wrote, "The cost of violence, oppression, and brutalization of women is enormous" and in their struggle to survive, the inmates suffered not only physically, but spiritually and emotionally.

In Belfast the Church of Ireland-run Ulster Magdalene Asylum was founded in 1839 on Donegall Pass, and closed in 1916. Similar institutions were run in Belfast by Catholics on Ormeau Road, and by Presbyterians on Whitehall Parade.

=== Penitential regime ===
Mary Magdalene, who the laundries drew inspiration from in their names, was a symbol for the institutions as the exemplar of both spiritual regeneration and repentance; the symbol was analogous to laundries’ ostensible goal to “establish or make good each and every citizen's relationship with ‘their Creator’”. When entering most institutions, penitents were told to forget and not speak of their past and were assigned new names. In the religious-run laundries, women were often given names of saints, whilst in lay asylums such as the Leeson Street institution inmates were assigned numbers. The practice aimed to maintain the anonymity of the women admitted to the institutions, but historian Frances Finnegan points out that the assigned names also suppressed the individual identities of penitents. Labour in the laundries, despite contributing as an economic activity, was perceived as a means of spiritual improvement, and was described as a way for “the mind to be tranquillised [sic]”, purportedly having “made the penitents more amenable to religious instruction”.

The day-to-day life of inmates was managed under a penitential regime, which aimed to “bring penitents to God” by developing their virtuous habits. “The Rule of Silence,” which was enforced for several hours in a day, was a way of preventing “dissipation and dangerous conversations”, but Frances Finnegan argued also that the silence was implemented to maintain control and "quick discipline" of the penitents, especially in the laundries with greater numbers of penitents like the Good Shepherds. According to Finnegan, most women admitted "found the regime intolerable" as they were mandated to participate in "long hours of prayer and devotion", particularly incompatible with the educational background of a majority of the inmates.

In the institutions managed by the Sisters of Our Lady of Charity of Refuge, inmates were divided into three classes: the ordinary penitents, the Children of Mary, and the 'consecrated'—also referred to as “‘the class of perseverance’”; penitents were able to move up amongst these class levels "by demonstrating piety and discipline”. Those who reached the highest class, the ‘consecrated’, were expected to take a vow similar to that of the nuns, but were never allowed to become “‘real’ nuns” or be fully “integrated into the community”.

== "Fallen women" ==
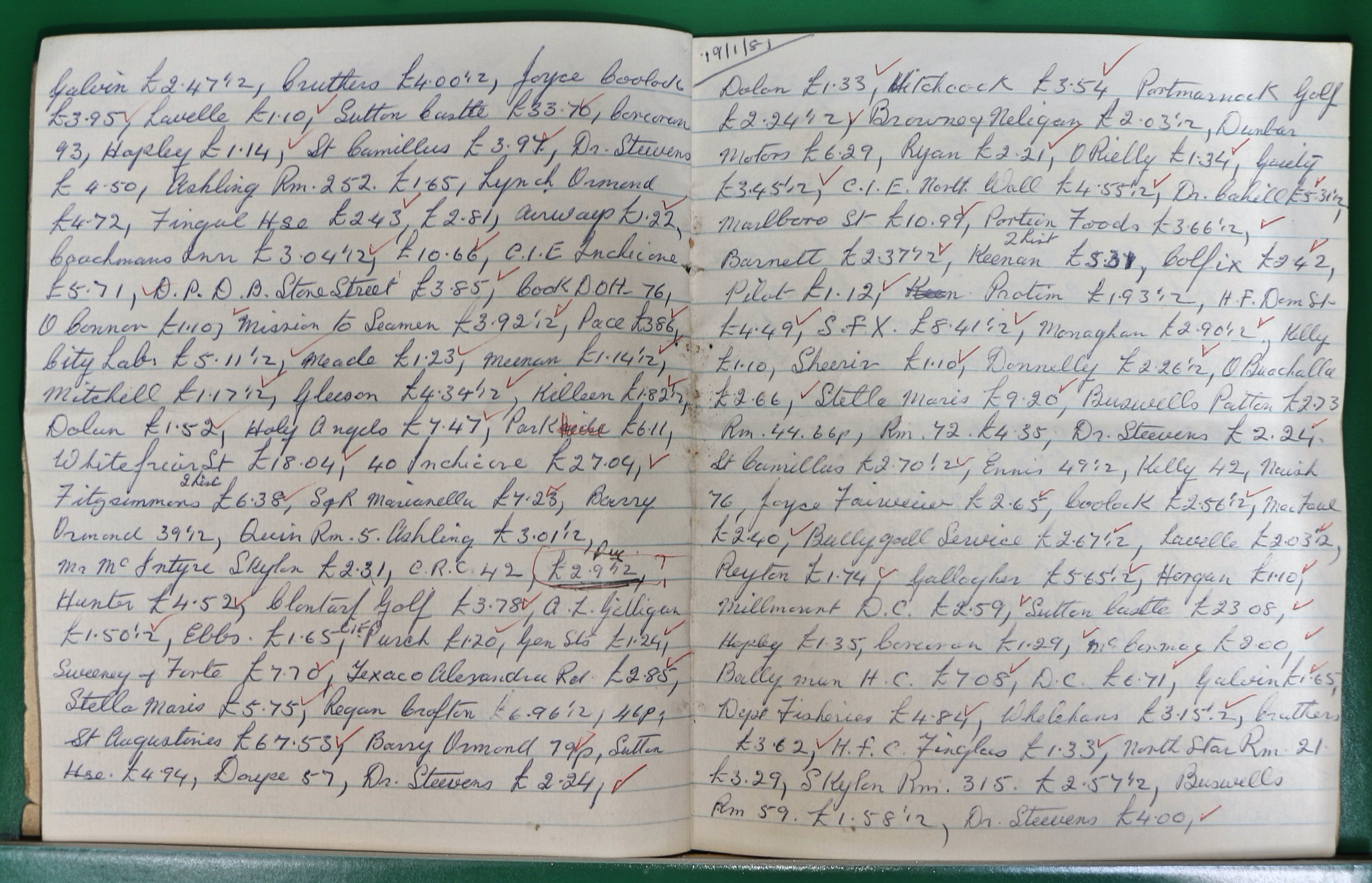
1981 ledger listing various clients of a Magdalene laundry

In the late 18th century, the term "fallen women" primarily referred to prostitutes, but by the end of the 19th century, Magdalene laundries were filled with many different kinds of women, including girls who were "not prostitutes at all", but rather "seduced women". Some of the "fallen women" had not willingly participated in sex (i.e., those who were victims of rape and/or incest), and some women and girls in the laundries were there not due to intercourse but rather because they were orphans, abused, deserted by their families, or did not conform to societal norms of the time. According to Frances Finnegan, author of Do Penance or Perish: A Study of Magdalen Asylums in Ireland, "Missionaries were required to approach prostitutes and distribute religious tracts, designed to be read in 'sober' moments and divert women from their vicious lives." Furthermore, "the consignment even of genuine prostitutes" to these laundries "seldom reduced their numbers on the streets, any more than did an individual prostitute's death," because, according to Finnegan, "so long as poverty continued, and the demand for public women remained, such losses were easily replaced."

Mary Raftery wrote that the institutions were failing to achieve their supposed objective: "the institutions had little impact on prostitution over the period," and yet they were continuing to multiply and expand due to their self-supporting free labour. Since they were not paid, Raftery asserted, "it seems clear that these girls were used as a ready source of free labour for these laundry businesses."

Additionally, the state of Ireland and its government were heavily intertwined with religion. Finnegan wrote:

The issue of continued demand for prostitutes was barely confronted, so absorbed were moralists with the disgraceful and more visible evidence of supply. And while acknowledging that poverty, overcrowded slum housing and lack of employment opportunities fuelled the activity...they shirked the wider issues, insisting on individual moral (rather than social) reform.

Finnegan wrote that based on historical records, the religious institutes had motivations other than simply wanting to curtail prostitution; these multiple motivations led to the multiplication of these facilities. According to Finnegan, as the motivations started to shift from a need to maintain social and moral order within the bounds of patriarchal structure to a desire to continue profiting from a free workforce, Magdalene laundries became a part of a large structure of suppression.

With the multiplication of these institutions and the subsequent and "dramatic rise" in the number of beds available within them, Finnegan wrote that the need to staff the laundries "became increasingly urgent." This urgency, Finnegan claims, resulted in a new definition of "fallen" women: one that was much less precise and was expanding to include any women who appeared to challenge traditional notions of Irish morality. She further asserted that this new definition resulted in even more suffering, "especially among those increasing numbers who were not prostitutes but unmarried mothers—forced to give up their babies as well as their lives." And as this concept of "fallen" expanded, so did the facilities, in both physical size and role in society.

Some argue that women were branded as both a mother and a criminal if they happened to have a child out of wedlock. The choices the women at the time had were very limited. They had no social welfare system; therefore, many resorted to prostitution or entered these mother-and-child homes, also known as Magdalene laundries.

Comparatively more is known about laundries in the 20th century due to detailed interviews with women who spent time in these institutions. In this later phase, the laundries lost their association with sex out of wedlock. None of Ireland's 20th-century laundries, except one, admitted pregnant women. Instead, women entered via the criminal justice system, reformatory schools, health and social services sector and self-admittance.

== Expansion ==
Several religious institutes established even more Irish laundries, reformatories and industrial schools, sometimes all together on the same plot of land, with the aim to "save the souls primarily of women and children". Examples were Sisters of Our Lady of Charity of Refuge and the Congregation of the Sisters of Mercy, who ran the largest laundries in Dublin. These "large complexes" became a "massive interlocking system…carefully and painstakingly built up…over a number of decades"; and consequently, Magdalene laundries became part of Ireland's "larger system for the control of children and women" (Raftery 18). Both women and "bastard" children were "incarcerated for transgressing the narrow moral code of the time" and the same religious congregations managed the orphanages, reformatory schools and laundries. Thus, these facilities "all helped sustain each other – girls from the reformatory and industrial schools often ended up working their entire lives in the Magdalen laundries".

Almost all the institutions were run by female religious congregations," i.e. sisters, and were scattered throughout the country "in prominent locations in towns and cities". In this way, according to Raftery, they were powerful and pervasive, able to effectively control the lives of women and children from "all classes". This second incarnation of Magdalen laundries vastly differed from the first incarnation, due to their "longevity" and "their diverse community of female inmates, including hopeless cases, mental defectives…[and] transfers from industrial and reformatory schools". These particular institutions intentionally shared "overriding characteristics, including a regime of prayer, silence, work in a laundry, and a preference for permanent inmates", which, as Smith notes, "contradicts the religious congregations' stated mission to protect, reform, and rehabilitate".

As this expansion was taking place and these laundries were becoming a part of a large network of institutions, the treatment of the girls was becoming increasingly violent and abusive. According to Finnegan and Smith, the asylums became "particularly cruel", "more secretive" in nature and "emphatically more punitive". Though these women had committed no crime and had never been put on trial, their indefinite incarceration was enforced by locked doors, iron gates and harsh sisters. By 1920, according to Smith, Magdalen laundries had almost entirely abandoned claims of rehabilitation and instead, were "seamlessly incorporated into the state's architecture of containment".

According to historian Frances Finnegan, in the beginning of these asylums' existence, because many of the women had a background as prostitutes, the women (who were called "children") were regarded as "in need of penitence", and until the 1970s were required to address all staff members as "mother" regardless of age. To enforce order and maintain a monastic atmosphere, the inmates were required to observe strict silence for much of the day.

As the phenomenon became more widespread, it extended beyond prostitutes to petty criminals, orphans, mentally disabled women and abused girls. A 2013 report made by an inter-departmental committee, chaired by Senator Martin McAleese, found no evidence of unmarried women giving birth in the asylum.

Given Ireland's historically conservative sexual values, Magdalen asylums were a generally accepted social institution well into the second half of the twentieth century. They disappeared with changes in sexual mores and a loss of faith in the Catholic Church due to repeated revelations of scandals. Though Finnegan suggests that a more critical reason is that they ceased to be profitable: "Possibly the advent of the washing machine has been as instrumental in closing these laundries as have changing attitudes."

== Numbers of women ==
An estimated 30,000 women were confined in these institutions in the 19th and 20th centuries, about 10,000 of whom were admitted since Ireland's independence in 1922. Smith asserts that "we do not know how many women resided in the Magdalen institutions" after 1900. Vital information about the women's circumstances, the number of women, and the consequences of their incarceration is unknown. "We have no official history for the Magdalen asylum in twentieth-century Ireland", Smith wrote. Due to the religious institutes' "policy of secrecy", their penitent registers and convent annals remain closed to this day, despite repeated requests for information. As a direct result of these missing records and the religious institutes' commitment to secrecy, Magdalen laundries can only exist "at the level of story rather than history". Though Ireland's last Magdalen asylum imprisoned women until 1996, there are no records to account for "almost a full century" of women who now "constitute the nation's disappeared", who were "excluded, silenced, or punished", and who Smith says "did not matter or matter enough" to a society that "sought to negate and render invisible their challenges" to conceived notions of moral order.

== Exposure and public reckoning ==
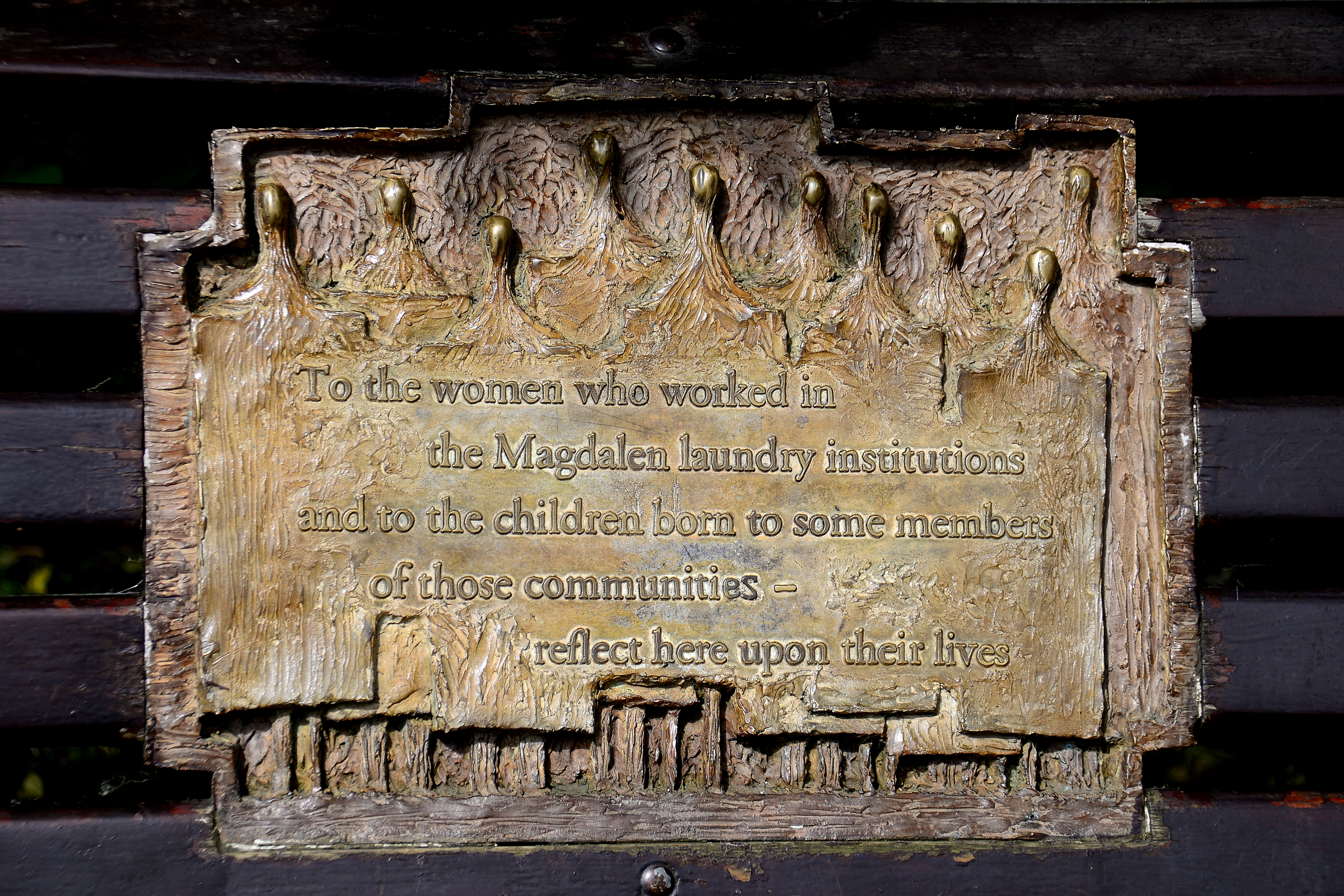
Magdalene seat, St Stephen's Green, Dublin

In Dublin in 1993, the Sisters of Our Lady of Charity – owners and operators of the laundry in High Park, Drumcondra – had lost money in share dealings on the stock exchange; to cover their losses, they sold part of the land in their convent to a property developer. This led to the discovery of 133 unmarked graves. The Sisters arranged to have the remains cremated and reburied in a mass grave at Glasnevin Cemetery, splitting the cost of the reburial with the developer who had bought the land. It later transpired that there were 22 more corpses than the sisters had applied for permission to exhume and death certificates existed for only 75 of the original 133, despite it being a criminal offence to fail to register a death that occurs on one's premises. In all, 155 corpses were exhumed, and cremated.

Though not initially reported, this eventually triggered a public scandal, bringing unprecedented attention to the secretive institutions. The 1997 Channel 4 documentary Sex in a Cold Climate interviewed former inmates of Magdalene Asylums who testified to continued sexual, psychological and physical abuse while being isolated from the outside world for an indefinite amount of time.

In 1999, former asylum inmates Mary Norris, Josephine McCarthy and Mary-Jo McDonagh gave accounts of their treatment.

Allegations about the conditions in the convents and the treatment of the inmates were made into a 2002 film The Magdalene Sisters, written and directed by Peter Mullan.

A number of campaigns and remembrance services have been undertaken to request the identification and reburial of those buried in mass graves. For example, Mary Collins (herself a survivor of the industrial school system), has campaigned with her daughter Laura Angela Collins for the right to the removal of her mother's remains from a mass grave, which is owned by the Religious Sisters of Charity.

== Government response ==
Since 2001, the Irish government has acknowledged that women in the Magdalene laundries were victims of abuse. However, until 2011, the Irish government resisted calls for investigation and proposals for compensation, maintaining that the laundries were privately run and that abuses at the laundries were outside the government's remit.

In June 2011, Mary Raftery wrote in The Irish Times that in the early 1940s, some Irish state institutions, such as the army, switched from commercial laundries to "institutional laundries" (Magdalene laundries). At the time, there was concern in the Dáil that workers in commercial laundries were losing jobs because of the switch to institutional laundries. Oscar Traynor, Minister for Defence, said the contracts with the Magdalene laundries "contain a fair wages clause", though the women in those laundries did not receive wages.

The Irish Times revealed that a ledger listed: Áras an Uachtaráin (the official residence of the President of Ireland), Guinness, Clerys, the Gaiety Theatre, Dr Steevens' Hospital, the Bank of Ireland, the Department of Defence, the Departments of Agriculture and Fisheries, CIÉ, Portmarnock Golf Club, Clontarf Golf Club, and several leading hotels amongst those who used a Magdalene laundry. This was unearthed by Steven O' Riordan, a young Irish film-maker who directed and produced a documentary, The Forgotten Maggies. It is the only Irish-made documentary on the subject and was launched at The Galway Film Fleadh 2009. It was screened on the Irish television station TG4 in 2011, attracting over 360,000 viewers. The documentary's website notes that a group called Magdalene Survivors Together was set up after the release of the documentary because so many Magdalene women came forward after its airing. The women who appeared in the documentary were the first Magdalene women to meet with Irish government officials. They brought national and international attention to the subject.

=== 2013 publication of inquiry report ===
Having lobbied the government of Ireland for two years for an investigation of the history of the Magdalene laundries, advocacy group Justice for Magdalenes presented its case to the United Nations Committee Against Torture, alleging that the conditions within the Magdalene laundries and the exploitation of their labourers amounted to human rights violations. On 6 June 2011, the panel urged Ireland to "investigate allegations that for decades women and girls sent to work in Catholic laundries were tortured." In response the Irish government set up a committee chaired by Senator Martin McAleese, to establish the facts of the Irish state's involvement with the Magdalene laundries.

Following the 18-month inquiry, the committee published its report on 5 February 2013, finding "significant" state collusion in the admission of thousands of women into the institutions. The report found over 11,000 women had entered laundries since 1922. Significant levels of verbal abuse to women inside was reported but there were no suggestions of regular physical or sexual abuse. The report also noted that, according to its analysis, the laundries were not generally highly profitable. Elderly survivors said they would go on hunger strike over the failure of successive Irish governments to set up a financial redress scheme for the thousands of women enslaved there. The Taoiseach, Enda Kenny, while professing sorrow at the abuses revealed, did not issue an immediate apology, prompting criticism from other members of Dáil Éireann. Kenny promised "there would be a full Dáil debate on the report in two weeks' time when people had an opportunity to read the report". Survivors were critical that an apology had not been immediately forthcoming.

=== State apology and compensation ===
On 19 February 2013, the Taoiseach, Enda Kenny, issued a formal state apology. He described the laundries as "the nation's shame" and said,

Therefore, I, as Taoiseach, on behalf of the State, the government and our citizens deeply regret and apologise unreservedly to all those women for the hurt that was done to them, and for any stigma they suffered, as a result of the time they spent in a Magdalene Laundry.

The Taoiseach also outlined part of the compensation package to be offered to victims of the Magdalene Laundries. He stated:

That's why the Government has today asked the President of the Law Reform Commission Judge John Quirke to undertake a three-month review and to make recommendations as to the criteria that should be applied in assessing the help that the government can provide in the areas of payments and other supports, including medical card, psychological and counselling services and other welfare needs.

A compensation scheme for survivors was set up by the Irish Government, which by 2022 and after an extension of the scheme, had paid out €32.8 million to 814 survivors. In March 2026, after a review of the Magdalen Restorative Justice Ex-Gratia Scheme by Senior Counsel Mary O'Toole, 134 out of 217 cases reviewed resulted in increased compensation ranging from €1,000 to €44,500, bringing a total increase in compensation of €1,311,400.

The religious orders which operated the laundries have rejected appeals, including from victims and Ireland's Justice Minister, to contribute financially to this programme.

== Catholic reaction ==
In February 2013, a few days after the publication of the McAleese Report, two religious sisters gave an interview for RTÉ Radio 1 under conditions of anonymity for themselves and their institute. They described the Irish media coverage of the abuse at the laundries (which they claimed not to have participated in), as a "one-sided anti-Catholic forum". They displayed no remorse for the institutes' past: "Apologize for what? Apologize for providing a service? We provided a free service for the country". They complained that "all the shame of the era is being dumped on the religious orders... the sins of society are being placed on us". On hearing the interview, a survivors' group announced to the press that they were "shocked, horrified and enormously upset" by the sisters' portrayal of events.

In a detailed commentary by Bill Donohue, the president of the Catholic League, a U.S.-based advocacy group, published in July 2013, Donohue wrote, "No one was imprisoned, nor forced against her will to stay. There was no slave labor, ... It’s all a lie." Donohue alleged that the women in the asylums were, "prostitutes, and women seen as likely candidates for the 'world’s oldest profession'. Unmarried women, especially those who gave birth out-of-wedlock, were likely candidates. Contrary to what has been reported, the laundries were not imposed on these women: they were a realistic response to a growing social problem [prostitution]."

In 1955, while the abuse of inmates was still occurring, the Scottish writer Halliday Sutherland was touring Ireland to collect material for his book Irish Journey. When he applied for permission to visit the Galway asylum, Michael Browne, the local bishop, reluctantly granted him access only on condition that he allow his account to be censored by the Mother Superior. The uncensored manuscript was discovered by Sutherland's grandson in 2013 and published in 2014.

The religious institutes, the Sisters of Mercy, Sisters of Our Lady of Charity of the Good Shepherd, and Religious Sisters of Charity, have refused demands from the Irish government, the UN Committee on the Rights of the Child and the UN Committee Against Torture to contribute to the compensation fund for surviving victims, an estimated 600 of whom were still alive in March 2014.

Commemorations honouring the religious orders that had operated the laundries have drawn criticism. In 2011, a monument was erected in Ennis at the site of the former Industrial School and Magdalene laundry in appreciation of the Sisters of Mercy. In 2015, Ennis Municipal Local Council decided to rename Friars Walk, a road which ran through the site of the former Industrial School and Laundry, in honour of the Sisters of Mercy. The new name is Bóthar na Trócaire (Road of Compassion).

== Media representations ==
=== The Magdalene Sisters ===
The Magdalene Sisters, a 2002 film by Peter Mullan, is centred on four young women incarcerated in a Dublin Magdalene laundry from 1964 to 1968. The film is loosely based on and "largely inspired" by the 1998 documentary Sex in a Cold Climate, which documents four survivors' accounts of their experiences in Ireland's Magdalen institutions. One survivor who saw Mullan's film claimed that the reality of Magdalen asylums was "a thousand times worse".

James Smith wrote that "Mullan offsets the long historical silence" that allowed the laundries and the violations by the religious institutes to "maintain their secrecy and invisibility".

The film is a product of a collective, including the four survivors (Martha Cooney, Christina Mulcahy, Phyllis Valentine, Brigid Young) who told their story in Sex in a Cold Climate, the historical consultant and researchers of the documentary who contributed historical information (Miriam Akhtar, Beverely Hopwood and Frances Finnegan), the directors of both movies (Steve Humphries and Peter Mullan, respectively), the screenwriter of The Magdalene Sisters who created a narrative (Peter Mullan again) and the actors in the film. The 2024 series, The Woman in the Wall, concerns survivors of the laundries.

=== Other film and stage ===
- An Triail, an Irish language play written by Máiréad Ní Ghráda, was first performed in 1964 featuring a scene in a Magdalene laundry.
- Eclipsed, a play about the Magdalene laundries, was written by Patricia Burke-Brogan in the 1980s. Burke-Brogan had worked in the laundries in the 1960s. Eclipsed was first performed in 1992.
- Les Blanchisseuses de Magdalene, a 1998 France 3/Sunset Presse documentary (historical consultant: Frances Finnegan).
- The Magdalen Whitewash, a play about the laundries, was written by Valerie Goodwin and performed by the Coolmine Drama group at the Draíocht Arts Centre in Dublin, in 2002.
- Sinners (2002), TV movie. Director Aisling Walsh, writer Lizzie Mickery, editor Scott Howard Thomas.
- The Quane's Laundry, a play about the Magdalene laundries, is set in Dublin in 1900 and written by Imelda Murphy in 2007.
- Laundry (2011), a play by ANU Productions, directed by Louise Lowe.
- "The Magdalen Martyrs", episode 3, season 1 of Jack Taylor, September 2011, focuses on a Magdelene laundry in Galway.
- Philomena is a critically-acclaimed 2013 drama film starring Judi Dench, based on the book by Martin Sixsmith.
- The Devil's Doorway, a horror movie from 2018. (In the fall of 1960, Father Thomas Riley and Father John Thornton were sent by the Vatican to investigate a miraculous event in an Irish home for 'fallen women', only to uncover something much more horrific.)
- The Woman in the Wall (2023) is a fictional BBC TV series featuring survivors of a Magdalene laundry.
- Small Things Like These (2024), an adaptation of the 2021 Claire Keegan novella. It is directed by Tim Mielants and led by Cillian Murphy.

=== Literature and reportage ===
- In her 2021 memoir, Rememberings, Sinéad O'Connor wrote about her teenage years living at the An Grianán Training Centre in Dublin.
- In the short story "Clay" in James Joyce's Dubliners, the Dublin by Lamplight Laundromat is a place for "fallen women", homeless and otherwise unattached women to work in a laundry and get meals and a place to stay. It is a Protestant charitable institution in Ballsbridge, run by spinsters, that tolerates Maria, a Catholic.
- In James Joyce's Ulysses, there is a veiled reference by Bloom to the Protestant-run Magdalene Asylum in Leeson Street, for the rescue of fallen women, in the Circe episode.
- Sex in a Cold Climate, a 1998 documentary directed by Steve Humphries (historical consultant: Frances Finnegan), presented interviews of four women interred in various Magdalene asylums and orphanages because of out-of-wedlock pregnancies, being sexually assaulted, or just being "too pretty".
- Do Penance or Perish: Magdalen Asylums in Ireland by historian Frances Finnegan published (hardback) Congrave Press Ireland, 2001; and (paperback) Oxford University Press, 2004. The first book to be published on the topic and still the definitive study, it is based on 21 years' research. Using a wide range of sources including the Annals and Penitents' Registers of the Good Shepherd archives, the book examines the history, purpose and inmates of the institutions. ISBN 0-9540921-0-4.
- The Forgotten Maggies, a 2009 documentary by Steven O'Riordan, launched at the Galway Film Fleadh.
- James M. Smith's Ireland's Magdalene Laundries and the Nation's Architecture of Containment won the 2007 Donald Murphy Prize for a Distinguished First Book from the American Conference for Irish Studies. ISBN 978-0-268-04127-4.
- Rachel Dilworth's The Wild Rose Asylum: Poems of the Magdalen Laundries of Ireland, the 2008 winner of the Akron Poetry Prize, is a collection of poems based on the Magdalene laundries.
- In the Shadow of Eden is a short memoir by Rachael Romero. Using vintage footage and photos of what led up to her incarceration in the Convent of the Good Shepherd (Magdalene) Laundries in South Australia, Romero outlines her experience there.
- For The Love of My Mother by J.P. Rodgers tells the story of his Irish mother, born into a life of poverty and detained at the age of two for begging in the streets. Bridget Rodgers spent the next 30 years of her life locked away in one institution or another, including the Magdalene laundries.
- The Magdalen Martyrs is a 2003 crime novel written by Ken Bruen. In the third episode of Bruen's Jack Taylor series, Jack Taylor is given a mission: "Find the Angel of the Magdalene", actually a devil incarnate nicknamed Lucifer, a woman who "helped" the unfortunate martyrs incarcerated in the infamous laundry.
- Kathy's Story: The True Story of a Childhood Hell Inside Ireland's Magdalen Laundries (ISBN 978-1553651680) by Kathy O'Beirne alleges that she suffered physical and sexual abuse in a Magdalene laundry in Ireland.
- Kathy's Real Story: A Culture of False Allegations Exposed (ISBN 978-1906351007) by journalist Hermann Kelly, published by Prefect Press in 2007, alleges that O'Beirne's allegations are false.
- "Magdalene Laundry Survivor. The Irish government admits it played a major role in forcing women into work camps." CBC radio interview, 5 February 2013.
- Irish Journey by Halliday Sutherland. Sutherland visited the Magdalene Laundry in Galway in April 1955 and wrote of the visit in the book. Sutherland met the Bishop of Galway to seek permission for the visit. Permission was granted on condition that anything he wrote about the Laundry be approved by the Mother Superior of the Sisters of Mercy. Accordingly, Sutherland's account in "Irish Journey" was censored. Following the discovery of the publisher's manuscript in a cellar in 2013, the uncensored version was published on hallidaysutherland.com in an article "The Suitcase in the Cellar".
- Ireland's Forced Labour Survivors, BBC radio documentary, 26 October 2014.
- The Lost Child of Philomena Lee, by Martin Sixsmith, published in 2010, is the true story of Philomena Lee's 50-year-long search for her forcibly adopted son, and Sixsmith's efforts to help her find him. It was adapted into the critically-acclaimed film, Philomena.
- The Magdalen Girls (2017) by V.S. Alexander is a novel set in a Magdalene laundry in the 1960s. ISBN 978-1-4967-0613-3.
- The Tinker Menace; the diary of an Irish Traveller (2019) by Laura Angela Collins tells the story of her mother Mary Teresa Collins, who entered an industrial school and became a child visitor to her mother, Angela Collins, at the laundry where she worked. The book also focuses on the life of Mary's mother, Angela, who worked for 27 years until she died in a Magdalene laundry and was then put into a mass grave, while Angela's children were adopted or put into other institutions in Ireland. The author reflects upon Irish Traveller history around the institutions and highlights the difficult fight for justice for a family within an ethnic minority group. ISBN 9781091090767
- Small Things Like These (2021) by Claire Keegan. A novella set in the town of New Ross featuring Bill Furlong's discovery of the convent's concealed misdeeds. Its afterword sheds light on the forced institutionalization and abuse suffered by these women.
- Magdalene Laundries, Liberate Grace (2024.1 Edition) ISBN 979-8-22-460133-2: The true story of the scandals and abuses of the Irish governments perpetrated against the young women of the Magdalene laundries and the Mother and Baby Homes from 1765 to 2024.
- In the 2023 documentary Crass: The Sound of Free Speech (The Story of Reality Asylum), the Magdalene Laundries are discussed extensively in the context of the English punk band Crass's song Shaved Heads.
- In 2023, Criminal (podcast) released episode #216 which is about the Magdalene Laundries. This includes interviews with survivor Elizabeth Coppin, brothers Declan, Andy, and Hugo McEntee who helped women and girls escape the Laundries, and expert on the topic Professor Katherine O'Donnell.

=== Music ===
- The Mars Volta has a track titled "Asilos Magdalena" on their 2006 album Amputechture.
- Frances Black has a song titled "Magdalen Laundry" on her 2003 album How High the Moon.
- A song called "Magdalene Laundry" written by J. Mulhern appears on the 1992 album Sentimental Killer by Mary Coughlan, with the chorus line "Ooh Lord, won't you let me wash away the stain."
- Joni Mitchell recorded "The Magdalene Laundries", a song about the atrocities for her 1994 album Turbulent Indigo. She re-recorded it with The Chieftains on their 1999 album Tears of Stone. Emmylou Harris covers the song on the multi-artist album A Tribute to Joni Mitchell. Christy Moore performs it on his 2005 album Burning Times and his 2006 album Live at the Point.
- British indie-folk group Bear's Den wrote a song titled "Magdalene" for their 2014 album Islands. in honor of the "daughters of Magdalene".
- French singer-songwriter Cécile Corbel wrote a song entitled "petit fantôme", about a child in Galway who grows up without his mother as she had been imprisoned in a Magdalene laundry after his birth.
- Irish singer-songwriter Sinéad O'Connor sings a portion of "The Magdalene Song" – an unreleased song – in the last episode of the BBC show The Woman in the Wall.
- The Kansas City-based folk rock group The Elders released a song about the Magdalene laundries, titled "Nation of Love", on their 2004 album American Wake.

== Memorial ==
In 2022 the Dublin City Council agreed to turn the building on Sean McDermott Street, the building of the last laundry that closed in Ireland in 1996, into a memorial and research centre. In 2022 a Journey Stone was unveiled by survivors of the Magdalene Laundries in Dublin. The Journey Stone memorial, situated at St. Stephen’s Green in Dublin, is meant to remember the suffering of the women who were incarcerated in Magdalene laundries and similar institutions. One of the group of survivors that unveiled the stone stated that it felt more appropriate to her than the centre, as she was actually involved in the decision-making process, unlike with the centre.

== See also ==
- Bethany Mother and Child Home
- Bon Secours Mother and Baby Home
- Castlepollard Mother & Baby Home
- Cavan Orphanage fire
- Dublin Female Penitentiary
- Dublin Magdalen Asylum
- Poorhouse
- Prostitution in the Republic of Ireland
- Roman Catholicism in Ireland
- Stranorlar County Mother & Baby Home
- Ulster Female Penitentiary and Laundry (Edgar House)
- Ulster Magdalene Asylum
- Women's Protection Board (Francoist Spain)
- Workhouse
