= St Patrick's Mother and Baby Home =

Former institution in Dublin, Ireland

St Patrick's Mother and Baby Home (originally known as Pelletstown) was an institution for unwed mothers and babies which operated for 81 years on the Navan Road in Dublin, Ireland.

== History ==
Originally known as Pelletstown, the home was built as a workhouse for the poor. It was renamed a mother and baby home, probably in 1904 with conversion works undertaken in 1906, which cost £11,000. The home was owned and funded by the Poor Law Guardians and the Dublin Union. It was operated on their behalf by the Daughters of Charity of Saint Vincent de Paul. It was the largest of Ireland's nine mother and baby homes, with up to 12,000 residents over its history. It was allowed to provide up to 149 beds for mothers and up to 560 places for children at any one time. In 1985 the land was sold for development and St Patrick's moved across the city to Eglinton House, a period house at 75 Eglinton Road in Dublin 4, previously the family home of Taoiseach Garret FitzGerald.

== Investigation ==
Historical records show that infant mortality rates at St Patrick's were up to 50% (in 1920) when the national rate was 6.6% (in 1922). The majority were buried in Glasnevin cemetery. Outbreaks of infectious disease spread rapidly in overcrowded and cramped conditions. Records show about 18,000 children passed through the home; of these about 42% were known to be adopted, while 27% returned to their families of birth. Records are unclear on the outcome of many of the children born in the home Survivors describe regular physical, psychological, and sexual abuse, particularly while being boarded out. While there is no documentary evidence of racism in the records, some sources suggest that staff may have had a negative bias to mixed-race babies though reports are conflicting. They were commonly transferred from other homes to St Patrick's. Only about half of mixed-race children were recorded as adopted, and non-adopted children sometimes moved to industrial schools once they were old enough, where they experienced similar abuse and neglect.

In the 1940s, conditions began to improve. The intervention of Chief Medical Adviser Doctor James Deeny in the Bessborough Home in Cork, which led to its temporary closure owing to poor conditions, had a significant impact on other such homes, including St Patrick's. Another important influence was the increased demand for adoptive babies among couples in the United States which meant that healthy Irish children became a valuable commodity. More than 250 babies were exported from St Patrick's to the United States.

In 2015, the Government of Ireland announced the Mother and Baby Homes Commission of Investigation into historical mistreatment of women and children at several institutions, including St Patrick's.

== Records ==
In 2020, records for St Patrick's and several other Mother and Baby Homes were transferred to the Child and Family Agency (Tusla). The transfer of data caused national discussion and controversy, with strong criticism from survivors of Mother and Baby Homes and their supporters. Concerns centred on the Government's plans to seal records for 30 years.

== Notable residents ==
- Niall Boylan, radio broadcaster, was born in the home in 1963
- Kevin Sharkey, artist and entertainer, was born in the home in 1961

== See also ==
- Mother and Baby Homes Commission of Investigation
