= Cavan Orphanage fire =

1943 deadly fire at St. Joseph's Orphanage in Cavan, Ireland

Coordinates: 53.991909°N 7.359652°W

The Cavan Orphanage fire occurred on the night of 23 February 1943 at St Joseph's Orphanage in Cavan, Ireland. 35 children and one adult employee died as a result. All of the lay teachers and nuns survived the fire. Much of the attention after the fire surrounded the role of the Poor Clares, the order of nuns who ran the orphanage, and the local fire service.

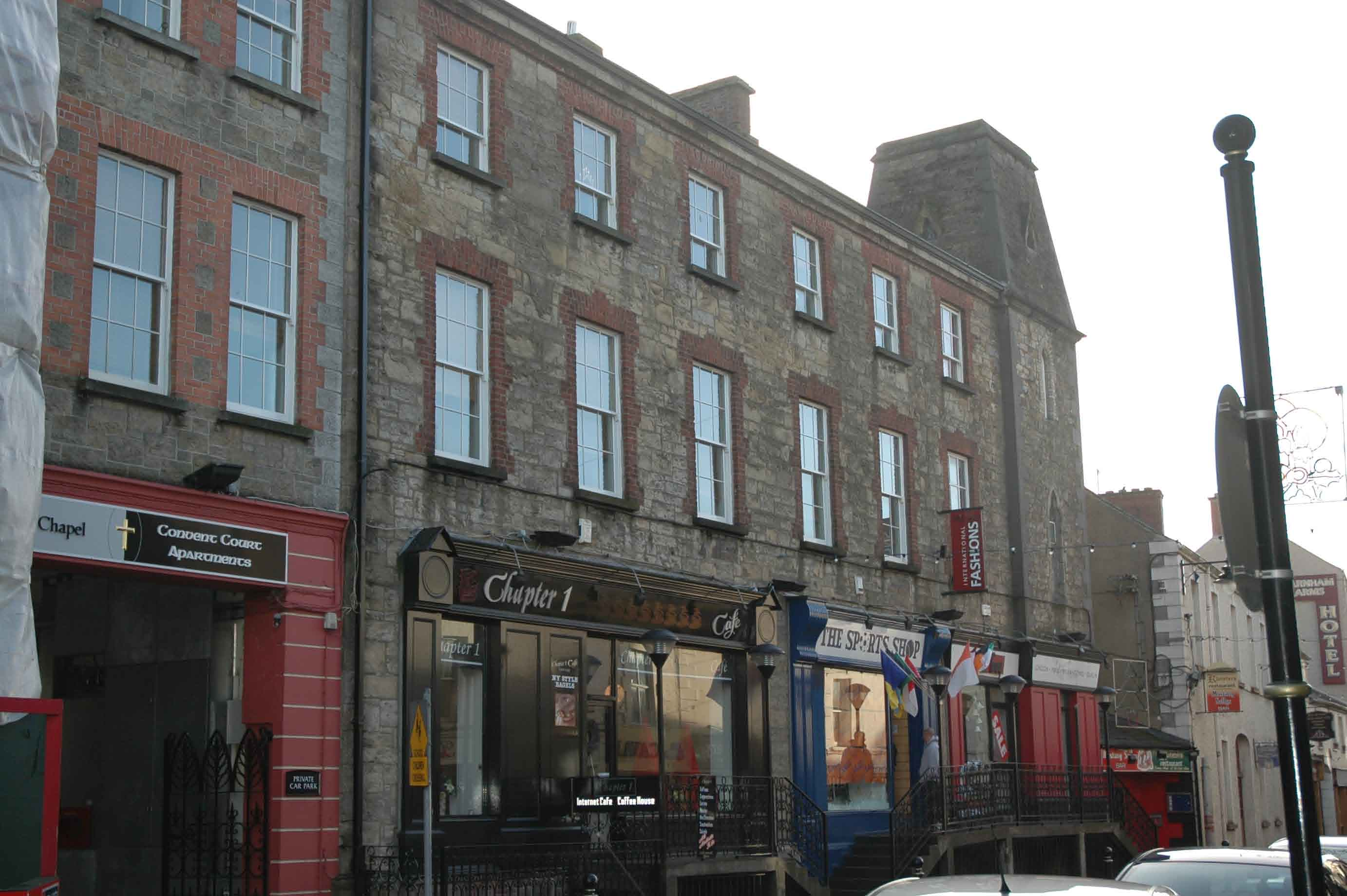
The site of the orphanage in 2007

== History of the orphanage ==
The Poor Clares, an enclosed contemplative order, founded a convent in Cavan in 1861 in a large premises on Main Street. In 1868 they opened an orphanage, designed by William Hague Jr. At that time young petty criminals could be educated and learn a trade in a reformatory; however, orphaned and abandoned children were not accorded the same opportunity. The Industrial Schools Act 1868 sought to address this by the establishment of the industrial school system. In 1869 a school, attached to the convent, was established and became known as the St. Joseph's Orphanage & Industrial School.

== Events of 24 February 1943 ==
=== Smoke is detected and the alarm is raised ===
A fire started in the early morning hours of 24 February 1943 in the ground-floor laundry and was not noticed until about 2 a.m. The subsequent investigation attributed it to a faulty flue. The laundry was on the ground floor and had a door opening onto an internal stairwell with wooden stairs. This stairway gave access to the first and second floors. Our Lady's Dormitory was on the first floor and the Sacred Heart Dormitory & St. Clare's Dormitory were on the second floor. All the dormitories had doors leading directly onto the wooden stairway. On the second-floor landing there was an emergency exit leading to an iron stairway outside in an enclosed courtyard. There was also a second internal stairway accessible from Our Lady's Dormitory on the first floor down to the ground floor.

The Tribunal of Inquiry broke the event into three phases; the first phase was estimated to be six minutes and started when smoke was first detected on the second floor just after 2 a.m. The laundry door was left open and smoke made its way from the ground floor up the wooden stairs. The door to the Sacred Heart Dormitory on the second floor was left open. The children in that dormitory were the first to notice the smoke. The smoke was not a difficulty at this point. There were no lights or bell as the electrical circuits were turned off. The children called their teacher Miss O’Reilly who also slept in the dormitory. She brought the children downstairs to the first floor to Sister Felix's cell.

Around this time, Miss Harrington in Our Lady's Dormitory on the first floor heard the noise from the floor above. She led the children in her dormitory out to safety.

Miss O’Reilly went back upstairs to the second floor using the wooden stairs to St. Clare's Dormitory. Finding it relatively free of smoke she directed the children into it. St. Clare's was right next to the Sacred Heart Dormitory where Miss O’Reilly and the children had been sleeping before the fire. The subsequent Tribunal of Inquiry believed at this point the children of both dormitories on the second floor could have been saved by either exiting down the wooden stairs, or by taking the emergency exit leading to the iron stairs outside. Miss O'Reilly subsequently fled the dormitory to safety with most of the children remaining dying in the fire.

=== Members of the public help ===
The sight of smoke coming out of the building alerted people on Main Street. They went to the front entrance and tried to gain entry. Six minutes after the fire was first detected the electrical circuit was switched on providing light and allowing the door bell to ring. A child, Rosemary Cafferty, opened to front doors and voluntary helpers entered the courtyard. At least two nuns arrived at the courtyard during this time. The Tribunal of Inquiry marked the entry of volunteers as beginning the second phase of the incident which they estimated lasted approximately ten minutes.

All of the girls were now in St Clare's Dormitory on the second floor. At this stage it would have been possible to evacuate all of the children but instead the nuns persuaded the local people to attempt to put out the fire. It has been widely claimed that the reason the orphans were not evacuated was that the nuns did not think it "decent" for the girls to be seen in public in their nightgowns. This is the claim of the RTE documentary "The Orphans That Never Were." The documentary includes an interview with Eileen Maloney who was the head of the Red Cross in Cavan at the time and witnessed the fire. She stated that the local people and the Red Cross wanted to save children in the building but "[w]e were being blocked by the nuns. They locked the doors and wouldn’t allow any – above all a man – didn’t get in. We could hear children crying, you know and you could hear voices. I remember hearing a voice saying 'Oh, you can’t go in there. You can’t go in there', you know that sort of thing." Eventually, local man John Kennedy, broke down the doors and got in. Another local man, Michael Holmes, stated "I have it from a reliable source that one of the reasons the children weren't taken out was because the nuns didn't want them to be seen in their nightgowns." Yet this source is never disclosed. Accounts from the orphans who survived the fire do not mention the nuns avoiding the public due to being in their nightgowns. One of the survivors, Catherine Graham, who was about fourteen years old at the time, remembered that she was "half dressed and we made our way down the stairs,” and that "[t]here was a fire escape at the top of the stairs, but we couldn’t use it because the nuns had the keys." The official tribunal and inquiry into the fire makes no mention of the nuns refusing to evacuate the children due to fear of the children being seen in their nightgowns.

The volunteers broke down the door of the refectory which was next to the laundry. The laundry door had been opened by a child who had been given keys by Sister Dymphna. The clothes drier in the laundry was on fire. Fire extinguishers were obtained, together with extinguishers from a nearby house. Two men (John Kennedy and John McNally) went down to the laundry to try to put the fire out. The flames were now too intense for this to be possible and McNally only survived by being carried out by Kennedy.

Some volunteers ran up the iron stairs in the courtyard to the second-floor emergency exit. Rosemary Cafferty had gone up the internal wooden stairs and had opened the emergency exit from the inside. The volunteers were separated from St Clare's Dormitory merely by the width of the internal landing i.e. 7 feet 6 inches (2.3 m). They did not enter onto the internal landing due to heavy smoke and having no knowledge of the internal structure of the building, or how to move in smoke. The volunteers returned down the iron stairs.

The Tribunal of Inquiry were satisfied that the volunteers genuinely believed that rescue work was impossible from that door. However, the Inquiry believed that rescue work would have been possible from that door if the volunteers had any fire-fighting knowledge. The reason being was that after the volunteers went down the outside iron stairs, a child, who had remained in the Sacred Heart Dormitory on the first floor, went down and exited using the inside wooden stairs by covering her face. Two further children who had come up the wooden staircase (including the one who opened the emergency exit from the inside) then left using the emergency iron stairs, again after volunteers had left. Around this time elder children in St Clare's Dormitory attempted to leave the dormitory but were deterred by smoke.

Miss Harrington deterred Sister Clare from going up the wooden stairs and when she instead went up the iron stairs, she met the volunteers returning. They told her that they were going to try to get the children out by Sullivan's yard. None of the volunteers remember this incident but based on the fact that they did directly go to Sullivan's yard the Inquiry accepted the nun's testimony.

The Inquiry believed that up until the end of the second phase all of the children could still have been evacuated with safety.

=== Rescue attempts from Sullivan's yard ===
By this point it was no longer possible for the girls to get out through the main entrance or the fire escape. The local fire brigade had then arrived but their equipment was not sufficient for this fire. Wooden ladders were not long enough to reach the dormitory windows. In the absence of any other solution girls were encouraged to jump. Three did so, though with injuries; however, most were too frightened to attempt it. At some point, a local electricity worker, Mattie Hand, arrived with a long ladder, and a local man, Louis Blessing, brought five girls down. One child left by way of the interior staircase while it was still accessible. One child made it down the exterior fire escape. One child escaped by way of a small ladder held on the roof of the shed. The fire completely engulfed the dormitory and the remaining girls died.

== Casualties ==
The following 35 children died:

- Mary and Nora Barrett (12-year-old twins from Dublin)
- Mary Brady (7 years old from Ballinagh)
- Josephine and Mary Carroll (10 and 12 years old, respectively, from Castlerahan)
- Josephine and Mona Cassidy (15 and 11 years old, respectively, from Belfast)
- Katherine and Margaret Chambers (9 and 7 years old, respectively, from Enniskillen)
- Dorothy Daly (7 years old from Cootehill)
- Bridget and Mary Galligan (17 and 18 years old, respectively, from Drumcassidy, County Cavan)
- Mary Harrison (15 years old from Dublin)
- Elizabeth Heaphy (4 years old from Swords, County Dublin)
- Mary Hughes (15 years old from Killeshandra)
- Mary Ivers (12 years old from Kilcoole, County Wicklow)
- Mary Kelly (10 years old from Ballinagh)
- Frances and Kathleen Kiely (9 and 12 years old, respectively, from Virginia, County Cavan)
- Mary Lowry (17 years old from Drumcrow, County Cavan)
- Margaret and Mary Lynch (10 years and 15 years, Cavan)
- Ellen McHugh (15 years old from Blacklion)
- Mary Elizabeth and Susan McKiernan (16 and 14 years old, respectively, from Dromard, County Sligo)
- Ellen Morgan (10 years old from Virginia)
- Mary O'Hara (7 years old from Kilnaleck)
- Ellen and Harriet Payne (8 and 11 years old, respectively, from Dublin)
- Philomena Regan (9 years old from Dublin)
- Kathleen Reilly (14 years old from Butlersbridge)
- Mary Roche (6 years old from Dublin)
- Bernadette Serridge (5 years old from Dublin)
- Teresa White (6 years old from Dublin)
- Rose Wright (11 years old from Ballyjamesduff)
- Nate Filson (6-7 years old from Virginia)

The one adult who died was 80-year-old Margaret Smith, who was employed as a cook.

== Aftermath and inquiry ==
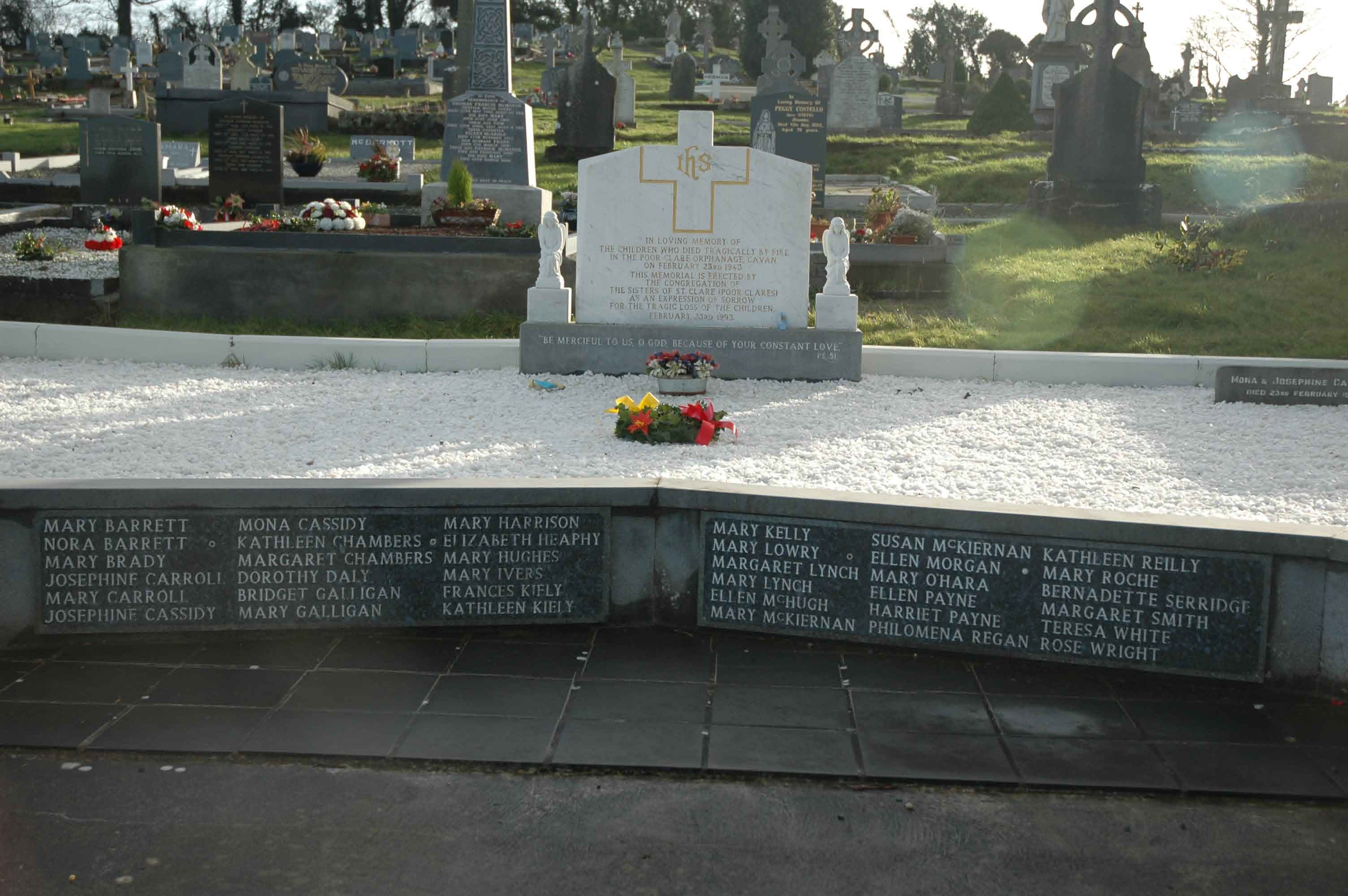
The grave containing the remains of the 36 victims.

Over concerns about the causes of the fire and the standard of care, a public inquiry was set up. The report's findings stated that the loss of life occurred due to faulty directions being given, lack of fire-fighting training, and an inadequate rescue and fire-fighting service. It also noted inadequate training of staff in fire safety and evacuation, both at the orphanage and local fire service.

This finding has been disputed by many, including in a limerick written by the secretary to the inquiry, Brian O'Nolan, better known as the author Flann O'Brien, and one of the counsel representing the Electricity Supply Board, Tom O'Higgins, later Chief Justice of the Supreme Court and presidential candidate.

In Cavan there was a great fire,

Judge McCarthy was sent to inquire,
It would be a shame,
If the nuns were to blame,

So it had to be caused by a wire.

— Flann O'Brien & Tom O'Higgins

It was alleged that the nuns prevented firefighters entering the building in case they saw the girls inside in a state of undress. Also, the structure of the orphanage, with many locked and barred doors, has been compared to a "fortress", presumably intended to safeguard the chastity of the inmates. Yet contemporary sources do not mention the nuns attempting to stop the fire brigade. According to contemporary accounts the fire brigade could not access the dormitory due to the massive flames and the insufficient length of their ladders. Further accounts show the nuns encouraged the girls to jump from the dormitory windows, which some did, despite being dressed in a dressing gown. As, according to multiple eye-witness contemporary report, the nuns did try to encourage the girls to escape, it is likely the claim about hiding girls in their nightgowns is false.

Due to the nature of the fire, the remains of the dead girls were placed in 8 coffins and buried in Cullies cemetery in Cavan. A new memorial plaque was erected in 2010 just inside the convent gates at Main Street, Cavan. The plaque was anonymously donated to the Friends of the Cavan Orphanage Victims group.

== Response to the fire ==
The town did not have any sort of formal or professional fire brigade. Although the stand-pipes connected to the public water main had recently been improved and increased, the apparatus for delivering water was wholly unsuitable – little more than a cart and a hose pipe (which, according to the inquiry, may have been faulty). The council had attempted to obtain a trailer pump, but this had been delayed by the war emergency. There was no pumping equipment and formal, organised structure of fire officers. On the night of the fire, the brigade in Dundalk was summoned by telephone. By the time the Dundalk Fire Brigade (which was a professional unit) had covered the forty-five or so miles of twisting road, there was nothing to be done. Enniskillen is about ten miles closer to Cavan than Dundalk and the roads are more direct. However, there is nothing to suggest that the Enniskillen Fire Brigade was summoned, even though Northern fire brigades had in the past crossed the border to assist in the South.

In 1950, as a direct result of the inquiry, the Department of Local Government issued a forty-seven-page fire safety recommendation entitled Fire Protection Standards for Public Buildings and Institutions. Its safety instructions covered areas for which "a Department of State has any responsibility or for which [it] has power to make rules or regulations in respect of the maintenance of inmates."

== See also ==
- 2022 Ürümqi fire – High-rise fire in Xinjiang, China
- 2002 Mecca girls' school fire – Incident in Saudi Arabia
