= Galway Suburban Rail =

Galway Suburban Rail (Irish: Iarnród Bruachbhailteach na Gaillimhe) is a suburban rail service currently operating on the Dublin–Galway line between Galway, Oranmore and Athenry.

== Services ==
Commuter services in the Athenry–Galway corridor consist of the following:

- Early morning and late evening services between Athlone and Galway serving the County Galway towns of Ballinasloe, Woodlawn and Attymon
- Morning and evening Intercity service originating from Limerick serving the County Galway towns of Gort, Ardrahan and Craughwell
- Evening services which continue to Athlone and Heuston Station, Dublin

Between these routes, there are 20 eastbound and 19 westbound services each weekday in this section, with 12 services from Galway and 11 services from Athenry on Sundays.

== Future developments ==
As of 2024, Iarnród Éireann were developing Ceannt Station, Galway to have five platforms, and developing a passing loop and second platform at Oranmore Station.

Under the Transport 21 plan, service is also planned between Tuam and Galway via the closed line to Claremorris. However, funding for this has not been identified and no Railway Order has been sought.

== See also ==
- Rail transport in Ireland
- Commuter (Iarnród Éireann)
