= Ennis railway station =

Railway station in Ennis, County Clare

Ennis Inis
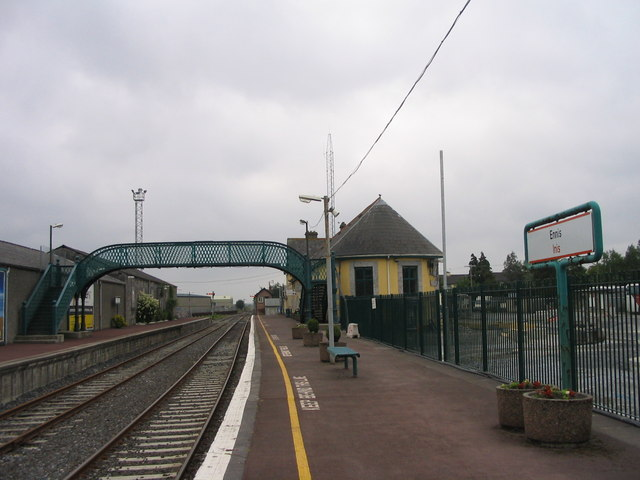

General information
- Location: Station Road, Ennis; County Clare, V95 WY02; Republic of Ireland
- Coordinates: 52°50′20″N 8°58′31″W
- Owner: Iarnród Éireann
- Operator: Iarnród Éireann
- Platforms: 2
- Bus operators: Bus Éireann; City Direct; TFI Local Link
- Connections: 51; 317; 317A; 318; 330; 330X; 333; 335; 336; 337; 342; 344; 350; NS1; NS2

Construction
- Structure type: At-grade

Other information
- Station code: 181

History
- Opened: 2 July 1859

Key dates
- 2 July 1887: Narrow-gauge services start
- 1 February 1961: Narrow-gauge services end
- 5 April 1976: Station closed
- 1984: Station reopened
Location

Ennis railway station serves the town of Ennis in County Clare, Ireland.

Ennis is the terminus station of the Limerick to Ennis Commuter service (intermediate stop Sixmilebridge) and a station on the Limerick to Galway intercity service. Passengers for Dublin/Cork or Waterford transfer at Limerick.

The station forms part of the Western Railway Corridor, the name given to a group of lines in the west of Ireland between Limerick and Sligo.

Five services pass through Ennis on the Limerick–Galway service with more just running Limerick–Ennis.

The Limerick Colbert to Galway Ceannt service calls at Sixmilebridge, Ennis, Gort, Ardrahan, Craughwell, Athenry and Oranmore.

== History ==
The regular passenger service Limerick–Claremorris through Ennis shut on 5 April 1976. Limerick–Ennis recommenced on Thursdays from 4 August 1984, two days a week from 12 April 1988, four days a week from 19 February 1993 and six days a week from 16 May 1994.

It was proposed to utilise the National Development Plan to fund regeneration of the railway in the west. The rail line between Ennis and Athenry was funded to enable a Limerick to Galway service (Phase one of Transport 21 Western Rail Corridor project). Opening of the Limerick to Galway service took place officially on 29 March 2010 and for the public on 30 March 2010.

== Facilities ==
There are two platforms in the station; Platform 2 is built on a passing loop. Access between the platforms is via a footbridge. There is a canopy over a section of Platform 1. Both platforms have benches, bins and information displays. Platform 1 has a help point. Inside the station there is a ticket office with hatches and ticket machines. There is also a waiting room which has vending machines. The station is beside the bus station.

== Closures Due to Flooding ==
In mid-February 2008, the train service between Ennis and Limerick was suspended due to severe flooding on a section of the line running through Newmarket-on-Fergus. Further flooding in the winter of 2009/2010 delayed the completion of the Western Rail Corridor project whose first timetable carried a January 2010 issue date even though it was 29 March 2010 before the first train ran.

Further flooding occurred in early 2014 leading to a 3-month closure.

The line was again closed owing to flooding from late November 2015 to May 2016

In March 2024, Irish Rail announced that the line would again be closed “until further notice” due to flooding. The line reopened in late April 2024.

== Interchange for Shannon Airport ==
Buses and taxis connect with Shannon Airport.

== See also ==
- List of railway stations in Ireland

Preceding station	Iarnród Éireann	Following station
Sixmilebridge	InterCity; Western Railway Corridor	Gort
Sixmilebridge	Commuter; Limerick Suburban Rail	Terminus
