= Ó Creachmhaoil =

Family name

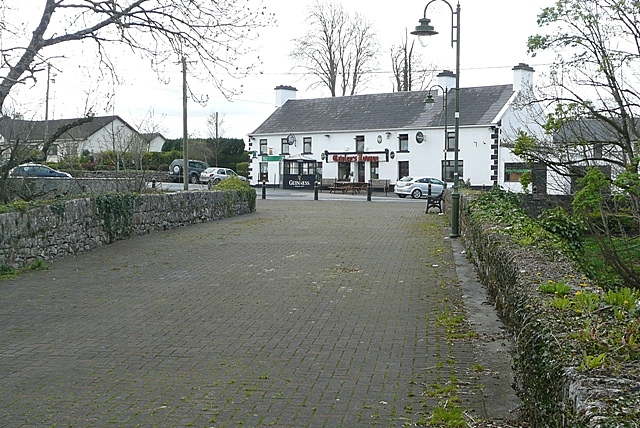
- The village of Creachmhaoil in County Galway, the presumed source of the surname

Origin
- Origin: Gaelic
- Region of origin: County Galway, Ireland

Other names
- Variant forms: Craughwell, Croughwell, Crockwell, Cragwell, Croghwell, Crachwell, Crachuell, Crackwell

Ó Creachmhaoil is an Irish surname, often anglicised as Craughwell, Croughwell, Crockwell, and Croghwell. Several sources, including Edward MacLysaght's Surnames of Ireland, associate the surname with the village of Craughwell (Irish: Creachmhaoil) in County Galway.

== Etymology ==
Ó, in Irish surnames, indicates a descendant of the person whose given name it precedes (as in Ó Briain: [descendant] of Brian). Creachmhaoil is not used as a given name in Ireland, and is instead a toponym - composed of two Irish (Gaelic) words. Creach, which is related to craig, and creag, and the English word crag, referring to a rock. Together with the word maoil (a hill).

An alternate etymology of creach is plunder, presumably in reference to herds of cattle, which were often targets of thefts and cattle raids amongst the Gaels. The usual Gaelic word for cattle is crodh, often Anglicised in place-names as crow, although the words cro, crocharsach, and crò are all connected with sheep, sheep enclosures or meadows.

A maol is a round-shaped hill or mountain, bare of trees. It is anglicised as mull, and is common in Irish and Scottish place names such as the Mull of Kintyre.

The complete toponym is used, today, to connote the village in Galway, but may have been adopted from a nearby hill. The village is too small to have been known far afield, and the surname is largely restricted in Ireland to County Galway. Ó Creachmhaoil, therefore, is presumably a toponymic surname adopted by villagers from Creachmhaoil (meaning "of Creachmhaoil") upon their moving to other areas.

== History ==
The surname was largely unknown outside of the south-east of County Galway, where the village of Craughwell (Creachmhaoil) is located, until the latter end of the 19th century. At that time, emigres established branches of the family in Cornwall and Devonshire (where it is sometimes mistaken for a variant of the surname Crocker), Liverpool, and London, in England, Newfoundland, Bermuda, Ohio and Berkshire County and Massachusetts. The surname (rendered Cragwell, Crockwell, Crogwell, Crachuell, Crackwell, Crackwill, Crockwill, Crockwile, Crachwell, and Crickwell) evidently arrived in Barbados in the 17th century (probably as part of the involuntary Irish immigration to Barbados that followed the Cromwellian invasion of Ireland)/ The Crockwells of Bermuda may descend from a single Barbadian who settled there in the 19th century, that spelling now appearing to be extinct in Barbados, possibly as a result of re-emigration.

== People ==
Notable bearers of the name include American painter Douglass Crockwell, Irish senator Gerard Craughwell, Bermudian football referee, Carlyle Crockwell, Bermudian footballer Mikkail Crockwell, Bermudian cricketer Fiqre Crockwell, and English cricketer Leslie Crockwell.
