= Athenry railway station =

Station in County Galway, Ireland

Athenry Baile Átha an Rí
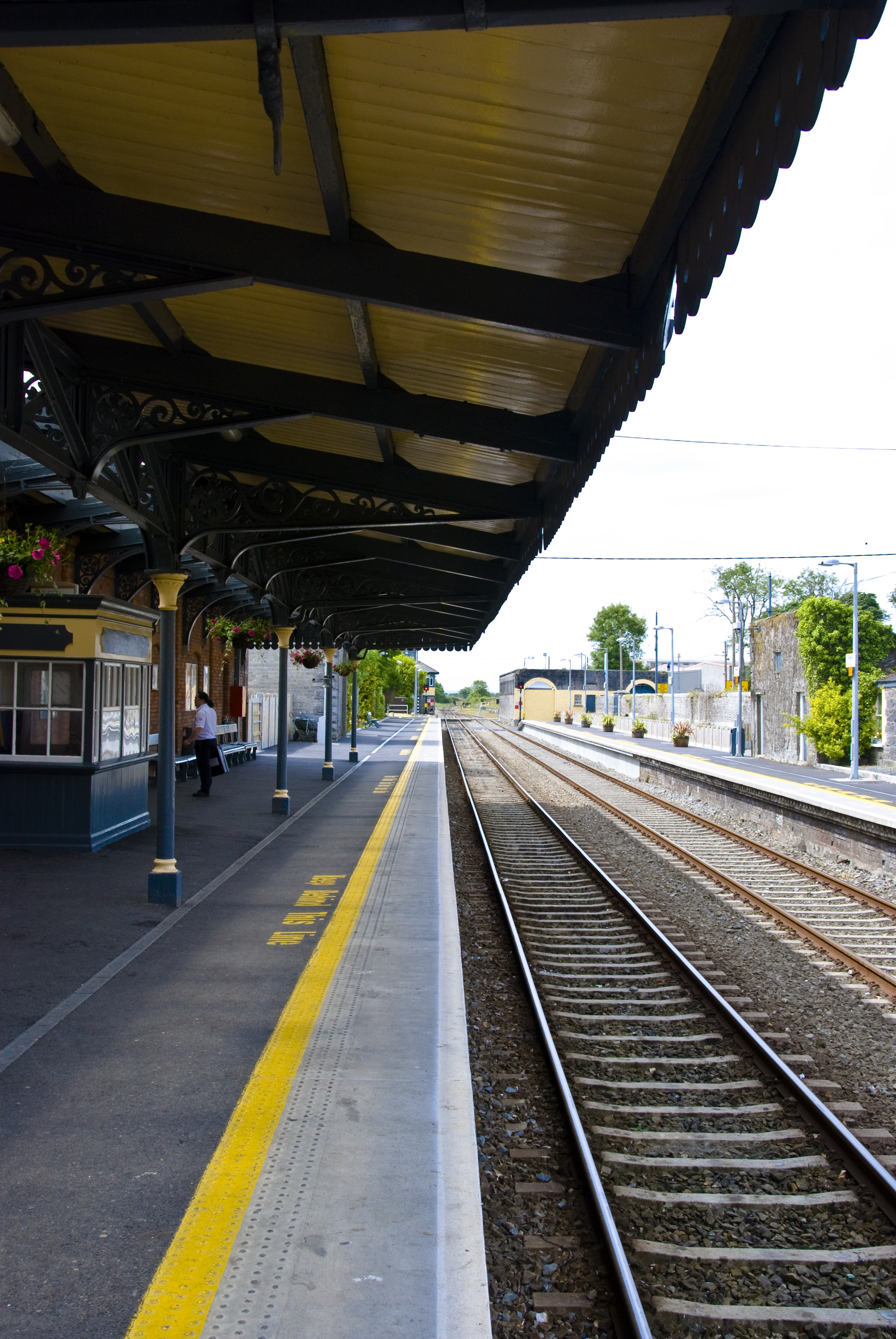
- Platform at Athenry

General information
- Location: Church Street; Athenry, County Galway; Ireland
- Coordinates: 53°18′3″N 8°44′59″W
- Elevation: 42 metres (138 ft)
- Owner: Iarnród Éireann
- Operator: Iarnród Éireann
- Lines: Dublin-Westport/Galway; Limerick-Galway
- Platforms: 2
- Tracks: 2

Construction
- Structure type: At-grade
- Parking: Yes
- Cycle facilities: yes

Other information
- Station code: ATHRY
- Fare zone: N

History
- Opened: 1 August 1851 (175 years ago)

Services
Preceding station	IÉ	Following station
Attymon	InterCity; Dublin–Westport/Galway railway line	Oranmore
Craughwell	InterCity; Western Rail Corridor	Oranmore
Terminus	Commuter; Galway Suburban Rail	Oranmore
	Future	
Craughwell	InterCity; Limerick-Tuam	Ballyglunin
Location

Athenry railway station serves the town of Athenry in County Galway.

The station lies on the Dublin to Galway intercity service, Galway to Limerick and Galway to Athenry commuter services.

Passengers for Westport and Ballina travel to Athlone and change trains.

It was once connected to Tuam and Claremorris in the north. This service may be resumed (see Western Rail Corridor).

== History ==
The station was opened on 1 August 1851, by the Midland Great Western Railway. In November 2016, it was announced the station could lose its connection to Ennis again by 2018 with the closure of the Ennis to Athenry line to save money; however, as of 2024 the line remains open.

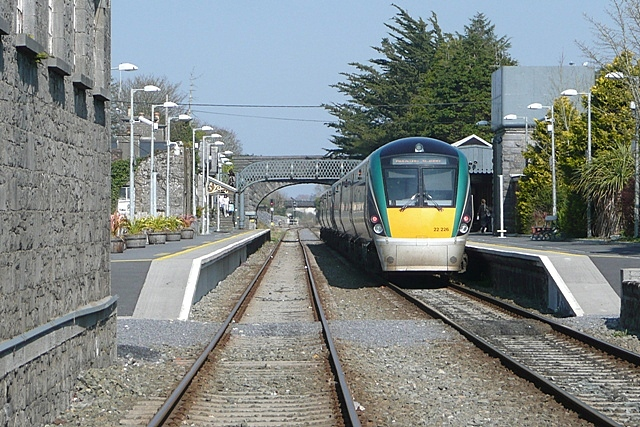
Athenry with a train heading to Galway

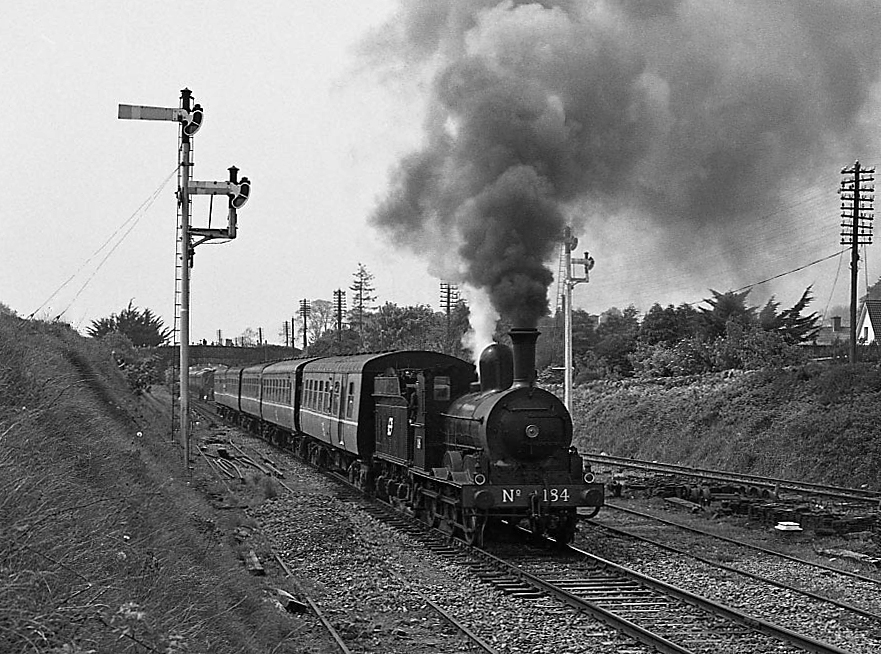
A steam hauled railtour in 1988

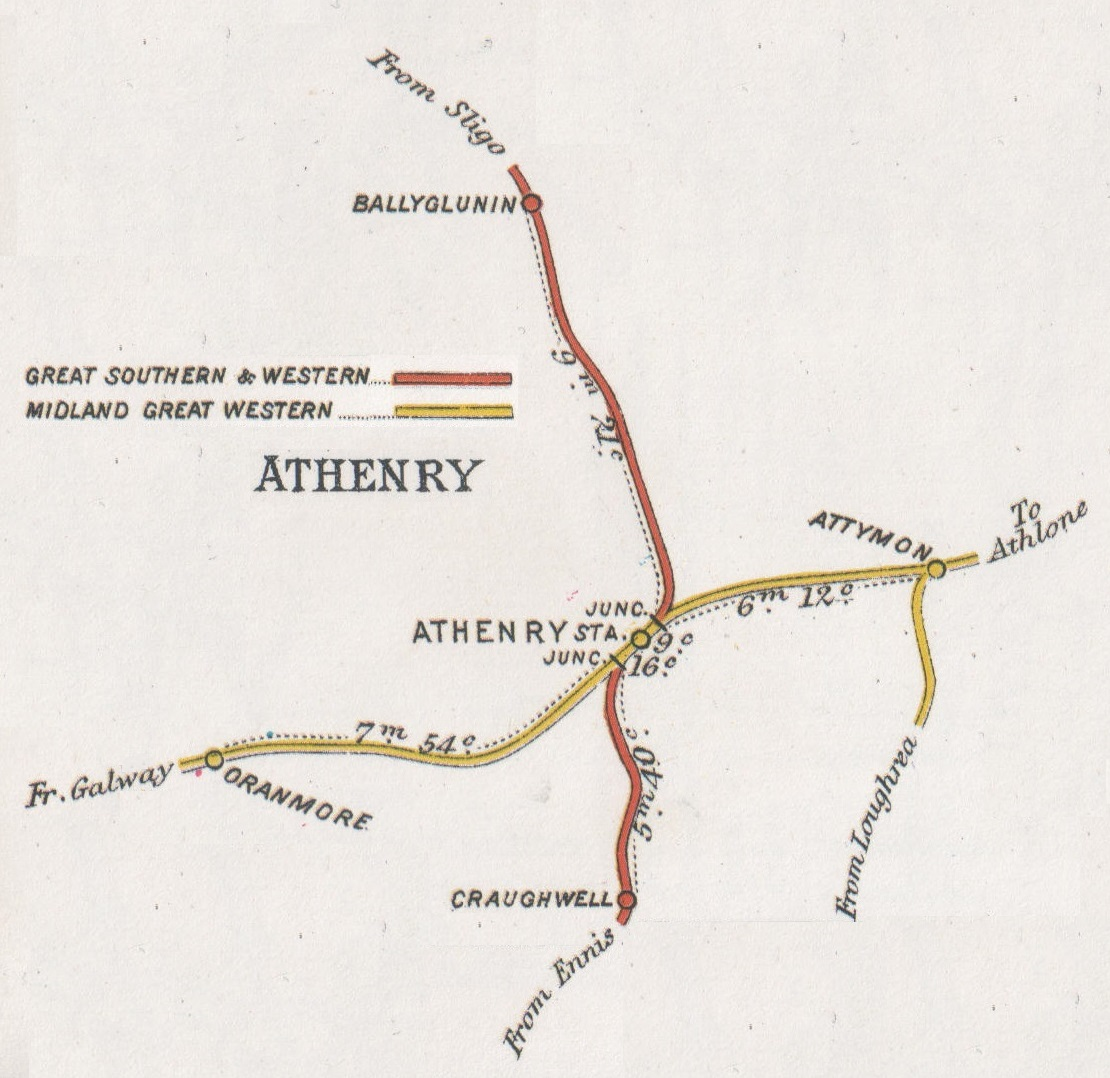
Athenry rail connections in the 1900s

== See also ==
- List of railway stations in Ireland
