= Craughwell =

Village and townland in County Galway, Ireland

Craughwell Creachmhaoil
- Village and townland
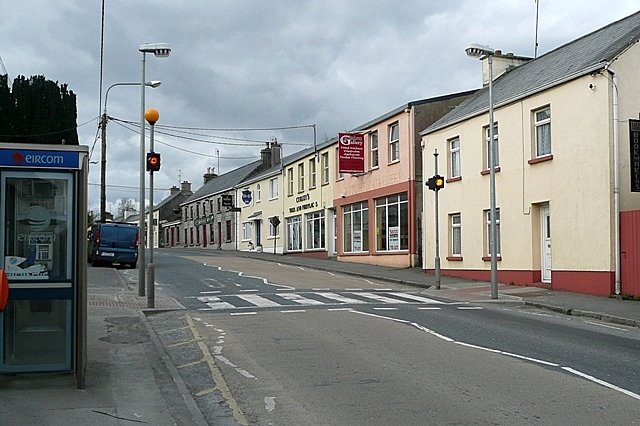
- The R446 regional road passes through Craughwell

- Location in Ireland
- Coordinates: 53°13′34″N 8°43′59″W
- Country: Ireland
- Province: Connacht
- County: County Galway
- Elevation: 62 m (203 ft)

Population (2022)
  - Total: 1,034
- Time zone: UTC+0 (WET)
  - Summer (DST): UTC-1 (IST (WEST))
- Irish Grid Reference: M510197

Craughwell (historically Creaghmoyle, from Irish: Creachmhaoil) is a village and townland in County Galway, Ireland. As of the 2022 census, the village had a population of approximately 1,000 people.

Craughwell is 8 km (5 mi) south of Athenry, 12 km (7 mi) west of Loughrea, and 22 km (14 mi) east of Galway city. It is on the R446 road, and is also served by Craughwell railway station on the Western Railway Corridor.

== Etymology ==
A number of derivations are given for the meaning of the Irish language place name Creachmhaoil or Creamhchoill.

In one derivation, the name is given as being composed of two Irish words: creach (meaning "plunder") and maoil (a hill). It is suggested that this is a reference to a place where herds of plundered cattle (the targets of thefts and cattle raids amongst the Gaels) were placed and kept.

A further etymology of creach is related to craig, and creag, and the English word crag, referring to a rock or the crest of a hill; and maol, a word referring to a round-shaped hill or mountain, bare of trees.

Patrick Weston Joyce, the pioneer of Irish placename studies, also speculated that the name in Irish was Creamhchoill, meaning 'garlic wood'. He was unaware of the local spelling and pronunciation but confirmed in a later work that the village was called Creachmhaoil in Irish.

The name Craughwell is also used as a surname, Ó Creachmhaoil, sometimes anglicised as Croghwell, Croughwell or Crockwell.

== History ==
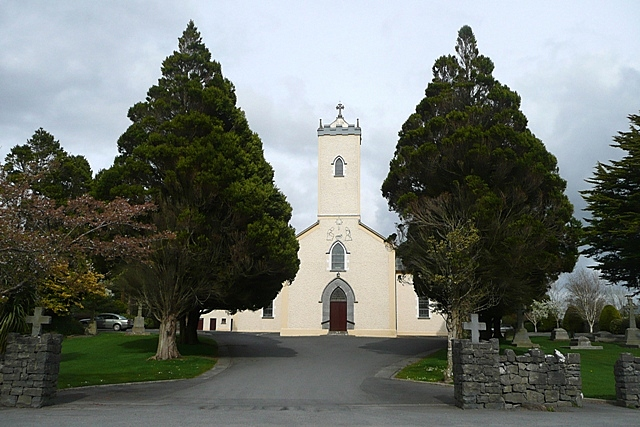
Saint Colman's Catholic Church was built c. 1840

Evidence of ancient settlement in the area includes a number of ring fort and souterrain sites in the townlands of Craughwell, Ballymore and Killora. A ruined medieval church and graveyard is also located in Killora townland. The current Roman Catholic church in Craughwell, Saint Colman's Catholic Church, was built c. 1840. Ballymore Park, a Georgian country house in Ballymore townland, was built c. 1750.

The poet Antoine Ó Raifteirí (born in County Mayo in 1779), was buried in Killeenin near Craughwell in 1835. A commemorative slab was erected over his grave, in 1900, by Augusta Lady Gregory.

During the Land War of the late 19th century, there were a number of violent incidents in the area around Craughwell. In May 1881, for example, a farmer named Peter Dempsey was shot and killed, on his way to Mass with his young daughters, because of a dispute over his tenancy of a vacant farm.

== Amenities ==
The community sporting facilities in the village include the grounds of Craughwell GAA, which has three pitches and a ball wall. The primary school has an all-weather astroturf track and a walking trail. Craughwell AC has an 8-acre park with an 800m trail surrounding a 400m running track. Just outside the village, Coleman's Park has outdoor soccer pitches and a gravel 400m running track. The local association football (soccer) club is Craughwell United FC.

== Transport ==
The R446 regional road, which connects Galway city to Kinnegad in County Westmeath, passes through the village. Prior to the construction of the M6 motorway, the R446 formed part of the main N6 road connecting Dublin and Galway.

Craughwell has a City Link stop on the Galway-Dublin commuter route, while Healy Bus also operate commuter services between Loughrea and Galway.

As part of Iarnród Éireann’s Western Railway Corridor project, under the Transport 21 plan, Iarnród Éireann reopened Craughwell railway station in 2010, having built a new single platform facility and car park close to the original site. There are five trains in each direction daily. The original station was opened in 1869 by the Athenry & Ennis Junction Railway, later part of the Great Southern and Western Railway, on the line from Athenry to Limerick.

== Notable people ==
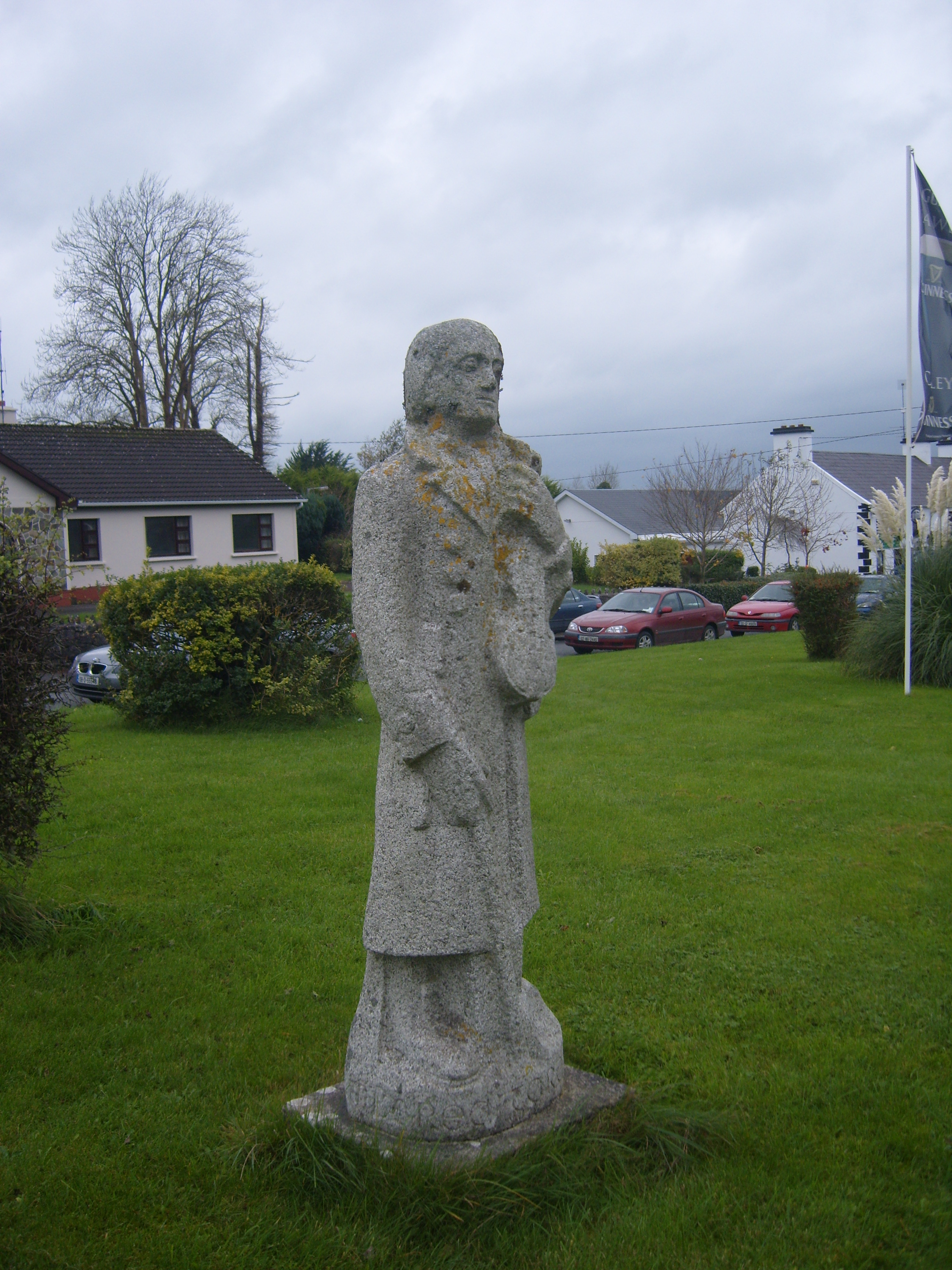
Statue of Antoine Ó Raifteirí in Craughwell

Notable people associated with the village include:

- Dominic Burke (c.1622–1704), Bishop of Elphin
- Fergal Healy (born 1977), hurler with Craughwell GAA
- Veronica Curtin (born c. 1980), Kinvara-born camogie player who played with Galway and Craughwell
- Niall Healy (born 1985), hurler with Craughwell GAA and Galway
- Denise Gilligan (born c. 1979), member of the 1996 Galway camogie team which won the Senior All Ireland Camogie title.
- Anjelica Huston (born 1951), daughter of John Huston who spent part of her youth in Craughwell.
- John Huston (1906–1987), American film-maker who owned St Clerans House near Craughwell from 1954 to 1971
- Thomas Monaghan (born 1997), hurler with Craughwell and Galway
- Robert O'Hara Burke (1821–1861), leader of the ill-fated Burke and Wills expedition into Australia.
- Antoine Ó Raifteirí (1779–1835), poet from County Mayo who died and was buried in the area.

== See also ==
- List of towns and villages in Ireland
