= Ballinasloe railway station =

Station in County Galway, Ireland

Ballinasloe Bhéal Átha na Slua
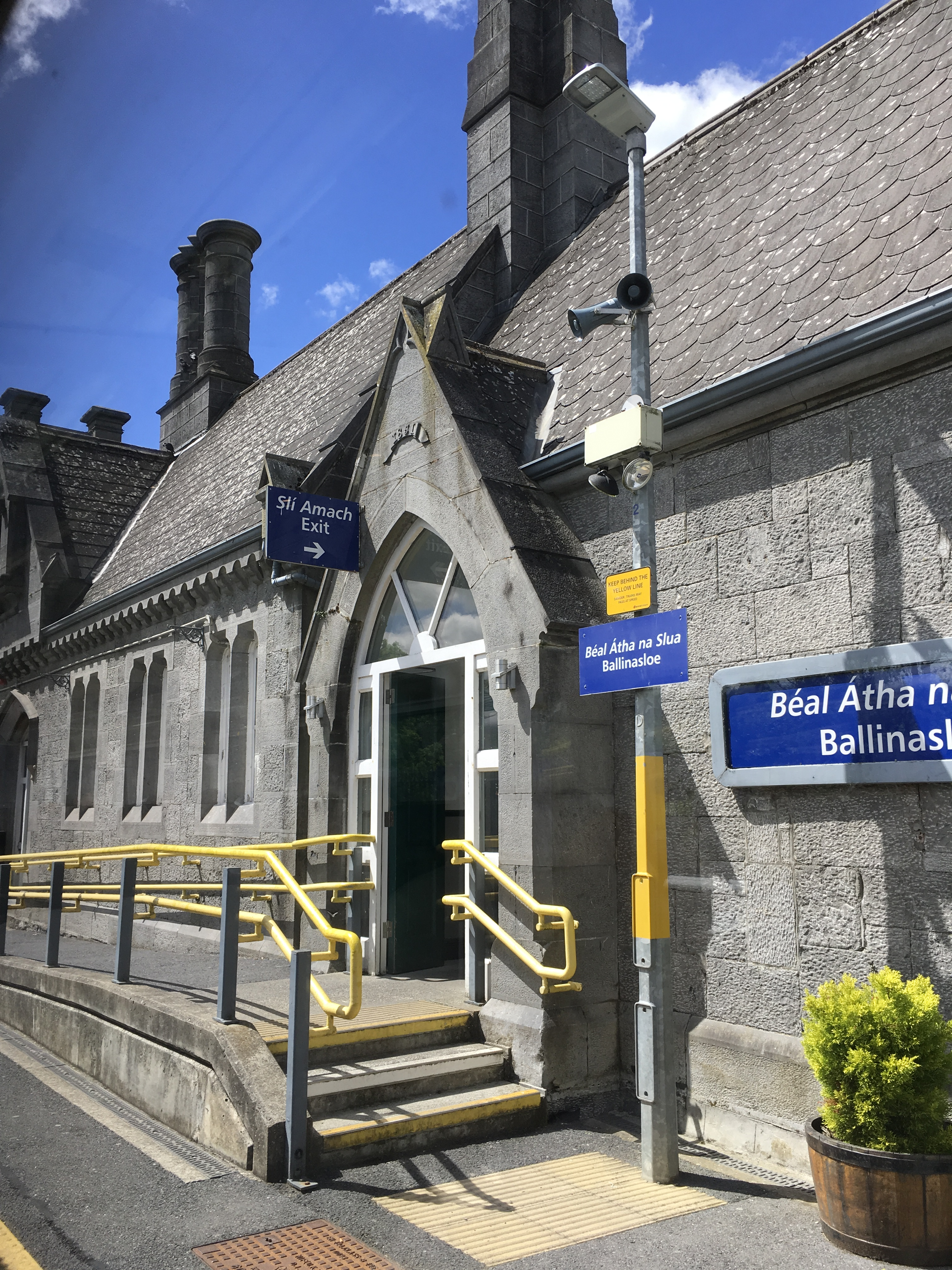

General information
- Location: Station Road, Ballinasloe; County Galway, H53 X657; Ireland
- Coordinates: 53.336255°N 8.240800°W
- Owner: Iarnród Éireann
- Operator: Iarnród Éireann
- Line: Dublin-Galway line
- Platforms: 2
- Tracks: 2
- Bus routes: 546; 547; 548
- Bus operators: TFI Local Link Galway

Construction
- Structure type: At-grade

Other information
- Station code: BSLOE
- Fare zone: L

Key dates
- Opened: 1 August 1851
- Iarnród Éireann; CIÉ; IÉ railway stations
Route map
Location

Ballinasloe railway station (Irish: Stáisiún Iarnróid Bhéal Átha na Sluaighe) is a railway station in Ballinasloe, County Galway. It is operated by Iarnród Éireann (IÉ). Opened in 1851, this railway station is a fine and imposing Tudor style building, designed by George Wilkinson.

The station is on the Dublin to Galway Rail service. Passengers to or from Westport travel to Athlone and change trains. Passengers to or from Limerick and Ennis travel to Athenry and change trains.

== History and design ==
The station was opened on 1 August 1851 by the Midland Great Western Railway. It is designed by George Wilkinson, and has been well-maintained since it was opened. The building is dressed with many gables that serve to articulate the roofline. The railway station is of considerable social and historical significance, having been built as part of the Great Midland and Western Railway network development in Ireland that improved the efficiency of public transport and linked remote areas of the country with larger urban settlements and ports.

== Services ==
Train Services

Preceding station	Iarnród Éireann	Following station
Athlone	InterCity; Dublin–Westport/Galway railway line	Woodlawn

Bus Services

TFI Local Link Galway operate services from the road outside the station serving destinations such as Loughrea, Portumna, Castlerea Station & Ballinasloe Hospital

== See also ==
- List of railway stations in Ireland
