= Cusack Park (Ennis) =

Gaelic games stadium in County Clare, Ireland

- Páirc Uí Chíosóg

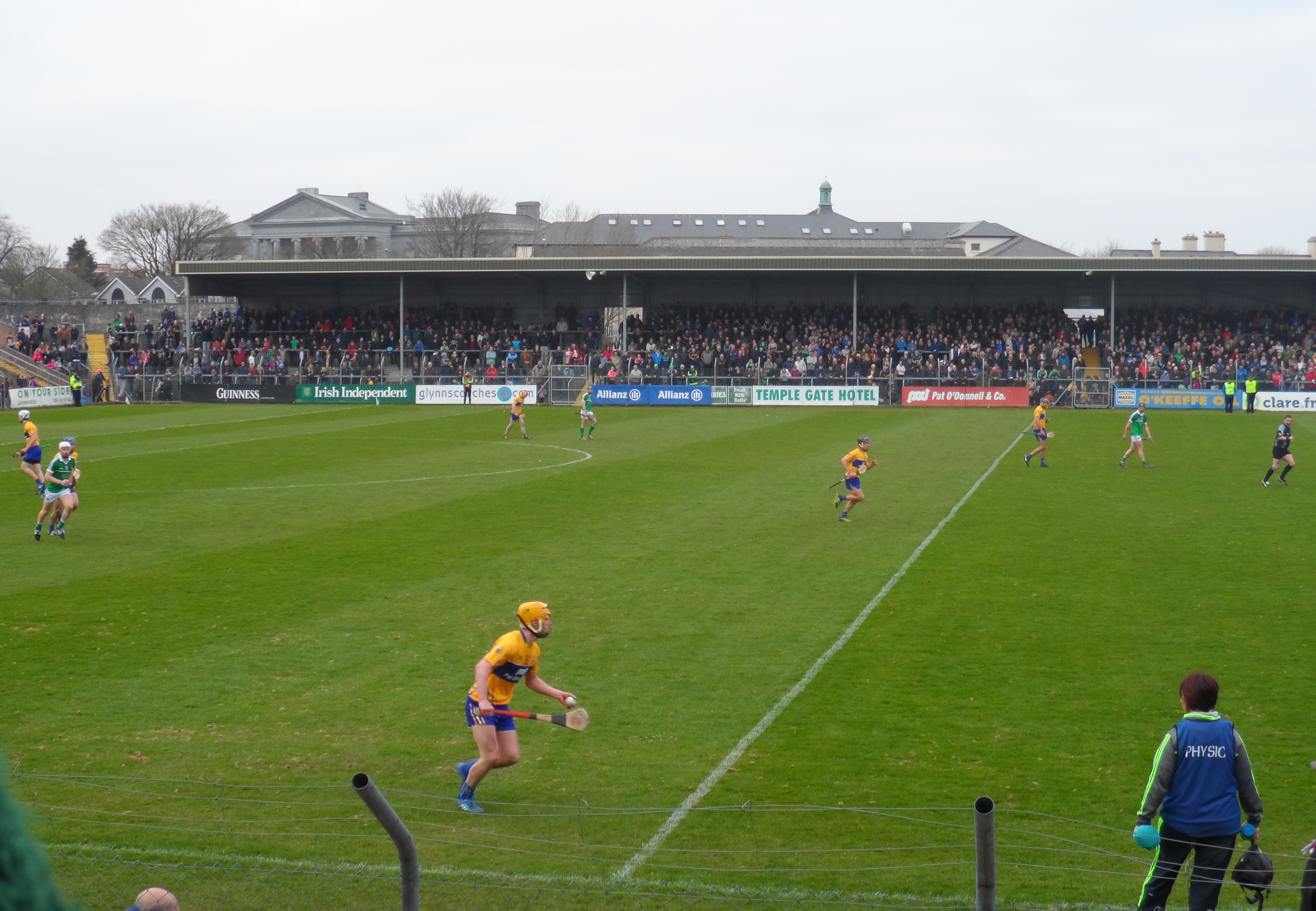

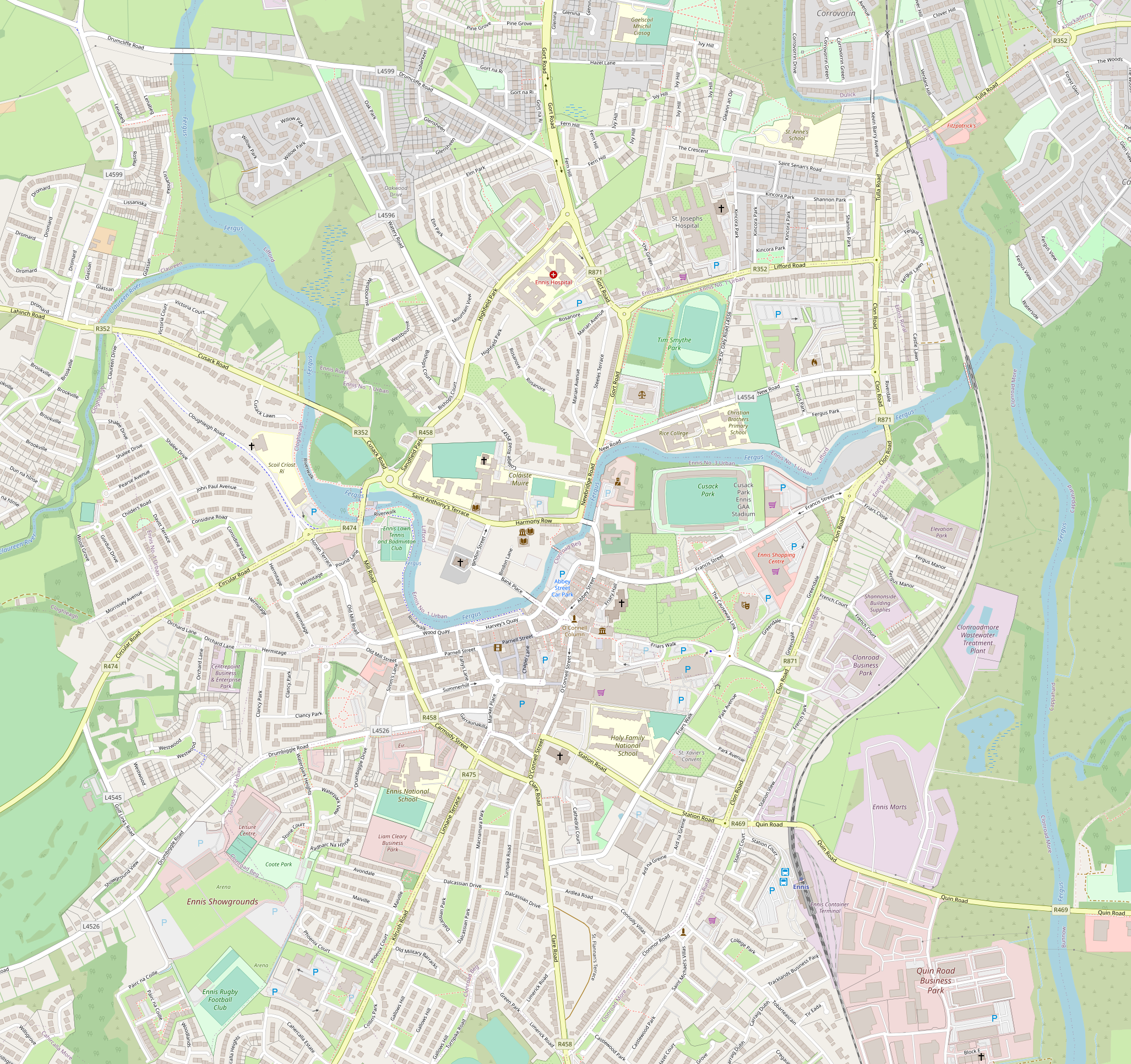
- Location within Ennis Location within Ireland
- Full name: Zimmer Biomet Páirc Uí Chíosóg
- Location: Francis St, Ennis, County Clare, V95 YP98, Ireland
- Coordinates: 52°50′46.73″N 8°58′43.18″W
- Owner: Clare GAA
- Capacity: 20,800 Capacity history: 27,846 14,864 (2011–2017) 19,000 (2018–2023) 20,800 (2024–present)
- Surface: Grass
- Field size: 145 x 90 m
- Public transit: Ennis railway station Dunnes Stores Friars Walk bus stop (Bus Éireann routes 343, 348)

Construction
- Opened: 1936
- Renovated: 2018

Website
- clare.gaa.ie/cusack-park/

Cusack Park (Páirc Uí Chíosóg in Irish) is a Gaelic Athletic Association (GAA) stadium in Ennis, County Clare, Ireland. It is the primary home of the Clare hurling, Gaelic football, camogie and Ladies' Gaelic football teams at all grades.

Named after the founder of the GAA, Michael Cusack, the ground had an original capacity of about 28,000 (mostly terraced), but following a 2011 safety review, the certified capacity was reduced to 14,864.

Three sides of the ground are terraced - the two areas behind the goals and one terraced length of the pitch which is also covered.

In 2006 there were media reports of substantial offers from property developers to buy the stadium and relocate it to a new 42,000 capacity site outside the town centre. However, by 2009 it appeared unlikely given the recent Celtic Tiger crash that this would happen. Between 2009–12, Clare GAA invested over €500,000 in refurbishment works including pitch drainage and fencing around the pitch. In 2015 a major renovation started, this included the demolition and re-erection of the main stand and construction of a new entrance/exit at the north side of the stadium. Once completed in late 2017 the official capacity was increased to 19,000 people for the start of the 2018 season.

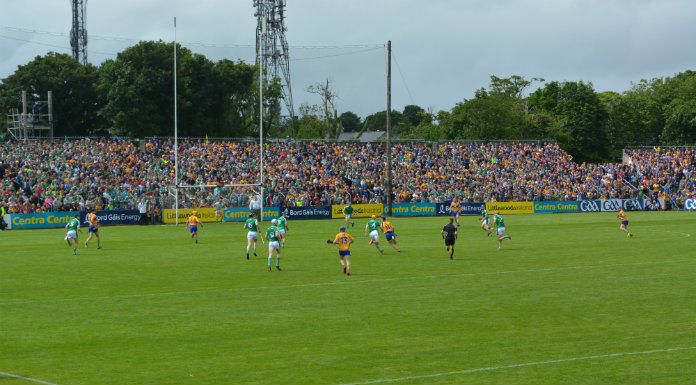
Clare vs Limerick in the Munster Hurling Championship, June 2018

On 17 June 2018 the stadium was completely sold out for the first time since re-opening for the visit of local rivals Limerick GAA

The knockout stages of the Clare Senior Hurling Championship and the Clare Senior Football Championship are held annually in the stadium.

A naming rights deal with Zimmer Biomet meant that, from March 2025, the stadium would be known as "Zimmer Biomet Páirc Uí Chíosóg" for sponsorship reasons.

== See also ==
- List of Gaelic Athletic Association stadiums
- List of stadiums in Ireland by capacity
