= Tuam railway station =

Station in County Galway, Ireland

Coordinates: 53.511576°N 8.853333°W

Tuam Tuaim
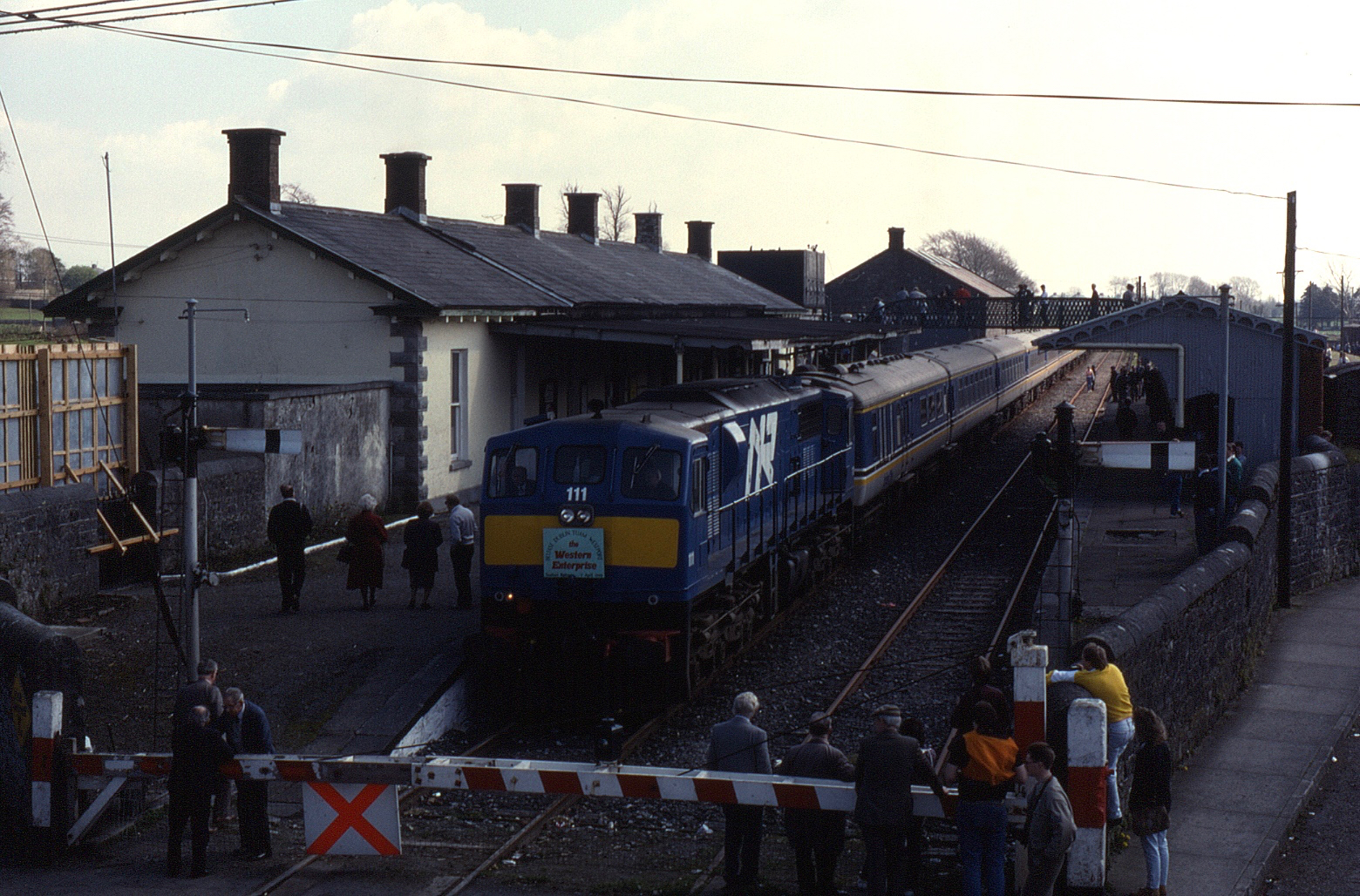
- 112 at Tuam railway station on 7 April 1990

General information
- Location: Sean Purcell Rd. Tuam, County Galway; Ireland
- Elevation: 119 feet (36 m)
- Owner: Iarnród Éireann
- Operator: Iarnród Éireann
- Platforms: 2
- Tracks: 2

Construction
- Structure type: At-grade

Other information
- Station code: TUAM
- Fare zone: N

History
- Original company: Waterford, Limerick and Western Railway
- Pre-grouping: Great Southern and Western Railway
- Post-grouping: Great Southern Railways

Key dates
- 1 August 1851: Station opened
- 1976: Station closes to passenger services
- 1993: Station closes fully
Location
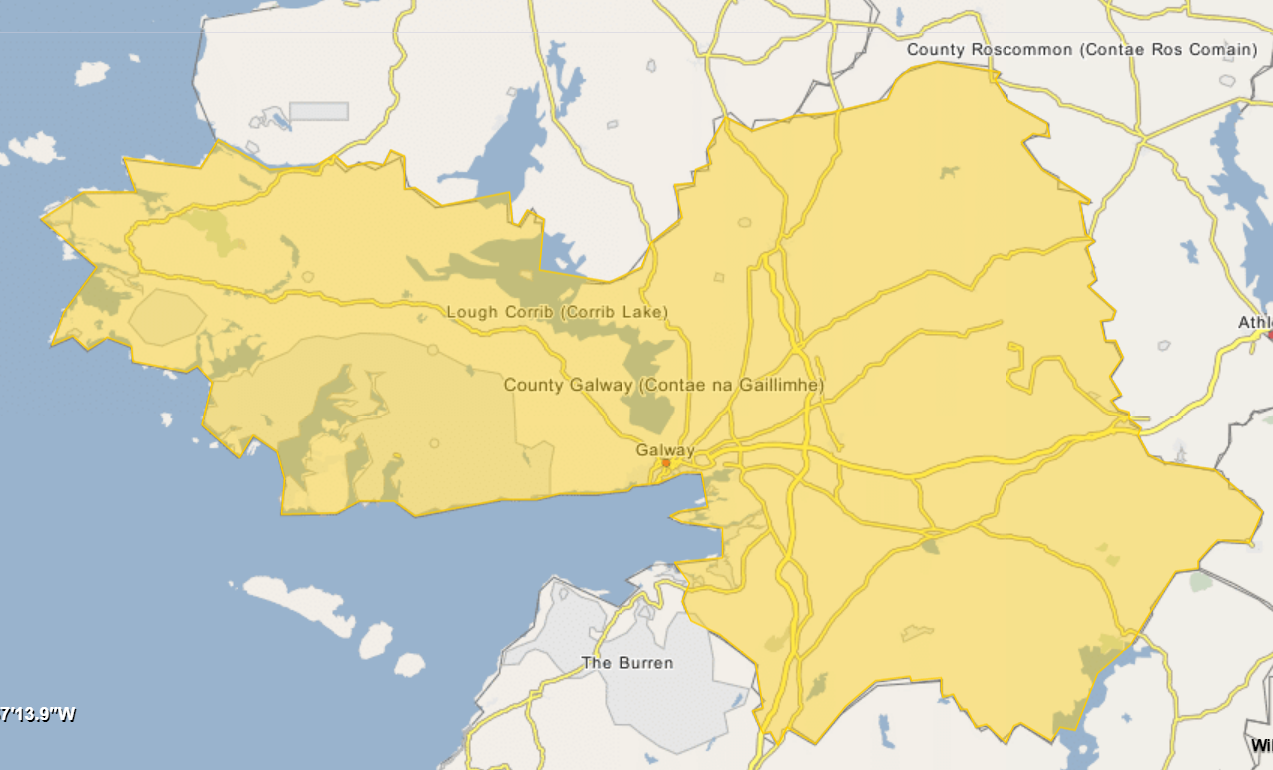
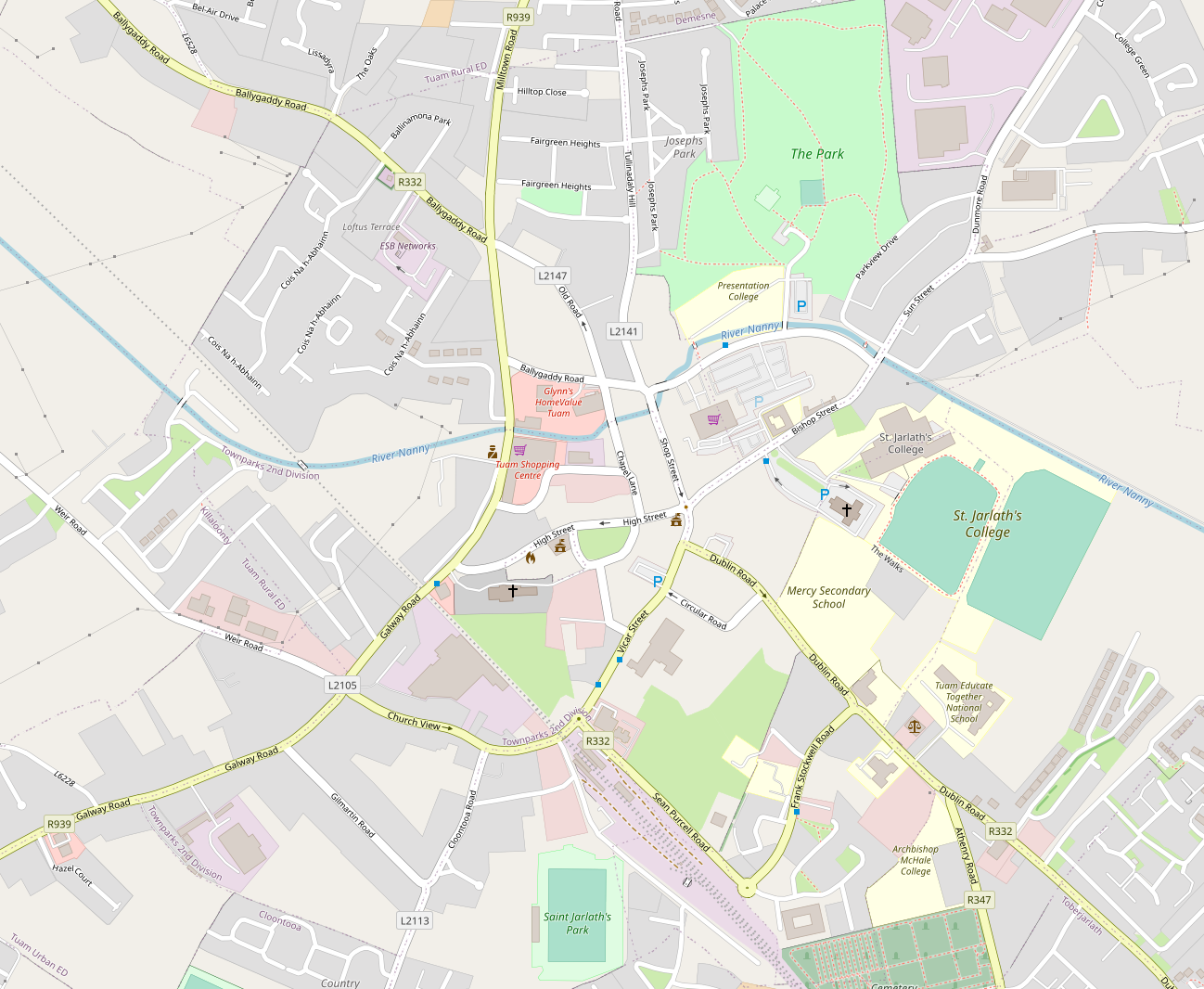
- Location within Ireland Location within County Galway Location within Tuam

Tuam railway station is a largely disused railway station in Tuam, County Galway, Ireland.

== History ==
The station was originally opened in 1860 as part of the Waterford, Limerick and Western Railway route between Limerick and Sligo, and was the major stop on the section between Athenry and Claremorris, being the only station on this section with two platforms and a passing loop. In 1901, the WLWR was purchased by the Great Southern and Western Railway, and thus became part of the GSWR's network. Tuam also featured an extensive goods yard and locomotive facilities. The station was closed, along with the whole route, in 1976 during Córas Iompair Éireann's rationalisation of the rail network.

After its closure to passenger trains, the goods facilities at Tuam continued to be heavily used, as the route remained a significant one for freight. The carriage and locomotive sheds were also used by a group called Westrail. This was a railway preservation group that operated trains between Athenry, Tuam and Claremorris until 1993, when Tuam station was closed as a block post.

== Railfreight ==
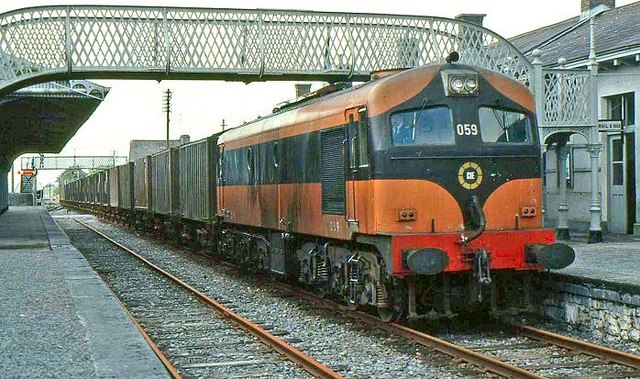
Former Asahi liner train bringing intermodal containers through the station in 1985

Like many railway stations in the country at the time, Tuam station handled goods on a daily basis up until the 1970s, when the general goods wagons used were replaced with heavy shipping containers that required forklifts or cranes to be loaded. Tuam was not one of the stations to be given this lifting equipment. The bulk transport of sugar beet pulp, sugar and other products for the Tuam Sugar Factory continued until the factory closed in 1987. After that, the line through the station was only used for freight trains passing through.

== Proposals ==
As part of the Transport 21 plan (published in 2005), the Limerick-Sligo route was to be rebuilt in stages as the Western Railway Corridor. The reopening of the Athenry-Claremorris section was planned in two sections. Section 1 expected the section between Athenry and Tuam to reopen, with an intermediate stop at Ballyglunin; the section between Tuam and Claremorris was to open as Section 2. Due to financial constraints in public finances, both sections were indefinitely postponed — though Irish Rail's Rail Vision 2030 report (published in 2012) recommended that Galway-Tuam be a priority for review if finances become available.

The 2024 All-Island Strategic Rail Review recommended that the rail line between Athenry and Claremorris be restored noting that the town of Tuam would "probably generate demand for a passenger service". In November 2025, funding for the reopening of the line between Athenry and Claremorris was granted, with Minister of State for Transport, Seán Canney stating that the project was designated as a targeted priority in the Department of Transport’s National Development Plan and that works on the line could commence within 18 months from the announcement. As of early 2026, preliminary clearance works had begun at Tuam station. As of September 2026, major enabling works on the line were expected to take place during 2027, with funding provided for full construction to commence in 2028.

Preceding station	Iarnród Éireann	Following station
	Proposed: WRC Phase 2	
Ballyglunin	InterCity; Limerick-Tuam	Terminus
	Proposed: WRC Phase 3	
Ballyglunin	InterCity; Limerick-Claremorris	Milltown
