= Moate railway station =

Former station in County Westmeath, Ireland

Coordinates: 53.39926°N 7.724472°W

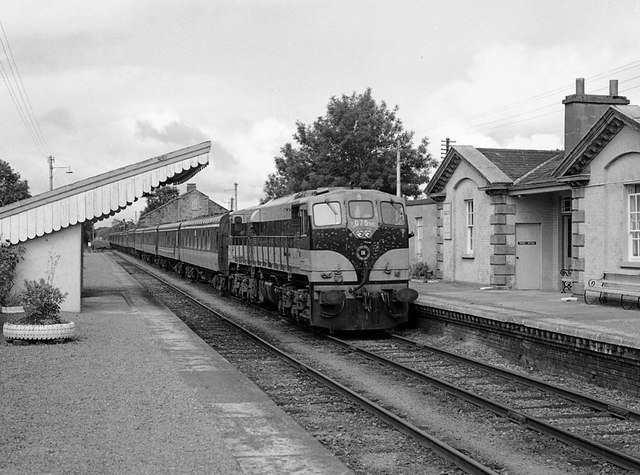
Train at Moate station (1987)

Moate railway station is a former railway station which served the town of Moate in County Westmeath, Ireland. Previously a stop on the Midland Great Western Railway's main line to Galway and later on the main route between Dublin and stations in County Mayo, the station was closed in 1987. As of 2015, the line and station at Moate form part of the Athlone to Mullingar Cycleway.

== History ==
The station was first opened in 1851, and located on the Midland Great Western Railway's line to Galway. The station formed part of the main route between Dublin, County Galway and County Mayo until 1973, when Córas Iompair Éireann transferred the majority of these services to the Great Southern and Western Railway route from Portarlington. At this point, services were cut back until finally the station was closed in 1987, severing the rail link between Athlone and Mullingar. Developments in the Irish economy in the 1990s and 2000s led to a re-evaluation of the need for an extended railway network, and the Irish government's Transport 21 plan had seen several rail expansion projects implemented, to restore several sections of the rail network. However, the line from Mullingar to Athlone via Moate was not included in these proposals, in spite of the Strategic Rail Review which led to the Transport 21 proposals recommending that it be reopened. This led to criticism in 2006 from the local community, and calls for Iarnród Éireann to rethink this. Ultimately however, the line and station remained closed.

== Cycleway ==
The proposal to reopen the line was dropped in favour of creating a cycling route known as the Dublin-Galway Greenway. Part of this cycleway uses the Athlone-Mullingar rail route.

Work began in early 2015 including works at Moate station. The Mullingar (West) to Garrycastle (Athlone East) section of the Galway to Dublin Cycleway was opened on 3 October 2015 by the then Taoiseach Enda Kenny in Moate.

Preceding station	Disused railways	Following station
Streamstown	Iarnród Éireann; Dublin-Galway (via Mullingar)	Athlone

== In popular culture ==
The station was used as one of the filming locations for the 1978 movie The First Great Train Robbery, starring Sean Connery and Donald Sutherland.
