= Ballyglunin railway station =

Former railway station in County Galway, Ireland

Ballyglunin Béal Átha Glúinín
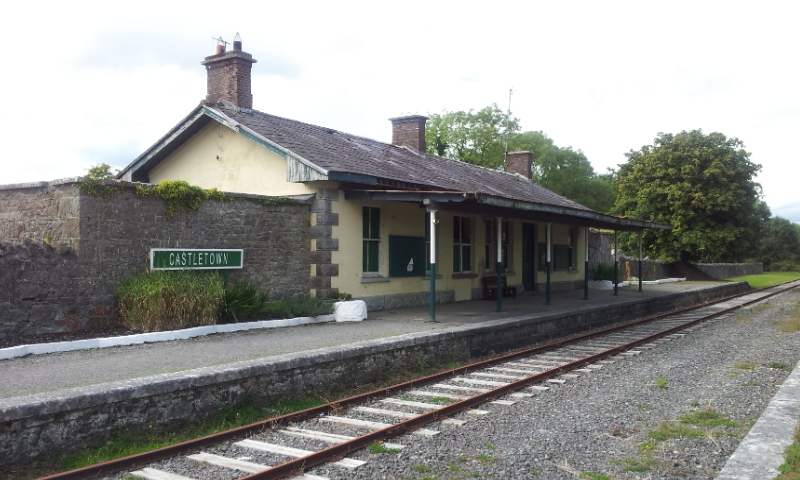
- Ballyglunin station, in 2014, with signage indicating the fictional name (Castletown) used in The Quiet Man

General information
- Location: Ballyglunin, County Galway; Ireland
- Coordinates: 53.4311°N 8.7937°W
- Line: Limerick to Claremorris

History
- Opened: 1860
- Closed: 1976
Location

Ballyglunin railway station (Irish: Stáisiún traenach Bhéal Átha Glúinín) is a disused railway station close to the village of Ballyglunin in County Galway. Closed in 1976, the station building is a protected structure which is known for its association with the 1952 film, The Quiet Man.

== History ==
The station is on the line from Limerick to Claremorris, and was originally opened in 1860 by the Waterford, Limerick and Western Railway. Operation was transferred to the Great Southern and Western Railway when it purchased the WLWR in 1901.

The station was used during the filming of the film The Quiet Man starring John Wayne and Maureen O'Hara in 1952. As part of the rationalisation of the rail network by Córas Iompair Éireann (CIÉ) in the 1960s and 1970s, the station was closed along with the rest of the line for passenger services in 1976.

In the 2000s, a local community group, the Ballyglunin Railway Restoration Project, sought to restore the station buildings and site as a heritage tourism attraction. This project, which focused on the station's association with The Quiet Man, resulted in a number of restoration and conservation activities. In late 2019, the project received additional government funding to facilitate development "as a visitor attraction".

The station building is listed on Galway County Council's Record of Protected Structures.

== Development proposals ==
The Irish Government's Transport 21 plan proposed that the Limerick-Claremorris line, with a stop at Ballyglunin, be re-opened as part of the Western Railway Corridor project. The first section of this line, between Limerick and Athenry stations, opened in 2010. Development of the second proposed section, between Athenry and Tuam via Ballyglunin, was not progressed. However, the reopening of the Athenry to Tuam section was included as a recommendation in the 2024 All-Island Strategic Rail Review. In November 2025, funding for the reopening of the Athenry-Claremorris line and was granted, with Minister of State for Transport, Seán Canney stating that the project was designated as a priority in the Department of Transport's National Development Plan and that works on the line could commence within 18 months of the announcement. In October 2026, it was reported that a station at Ballyglunin was being considered for inclusion in the restoration of the Athenry-Claremorris line, projected to commence in 2028, and that a new bridge over the N63 at Ballyglunin was being designed.
