= Ballyglunin =

Townland in County Galway, Ireland

Coordinates: 53.420°N 8.806°W

Ballyglunin or Ballyglooneen (Irish: Béal Átha Glúinín, meaning 'ford-mouth of the little knee') is a townland in the civil parish of Kilmoylan in County Galway, Ireland. The townland, which has an area of approximately 1.92 square kilometres (0.74 sq mi), had a population of 50 people as of the 2011 census.

Evidence of ancient settlement in the area includes a number of ringfort, tower house and ecclesiastical enclosure sites within Ballyglooneen and the neighbouring townland of Brooklodge Demesne. Ballyglunin Park (formerly known as Ballyglooneen House) is an 18th century country house built alongside the Abbert River. Built on the site of an earlier structure, the house is historically associated with the Blake family. It was extended in the 19th century by Martin Joseph Blake (1790–1861).

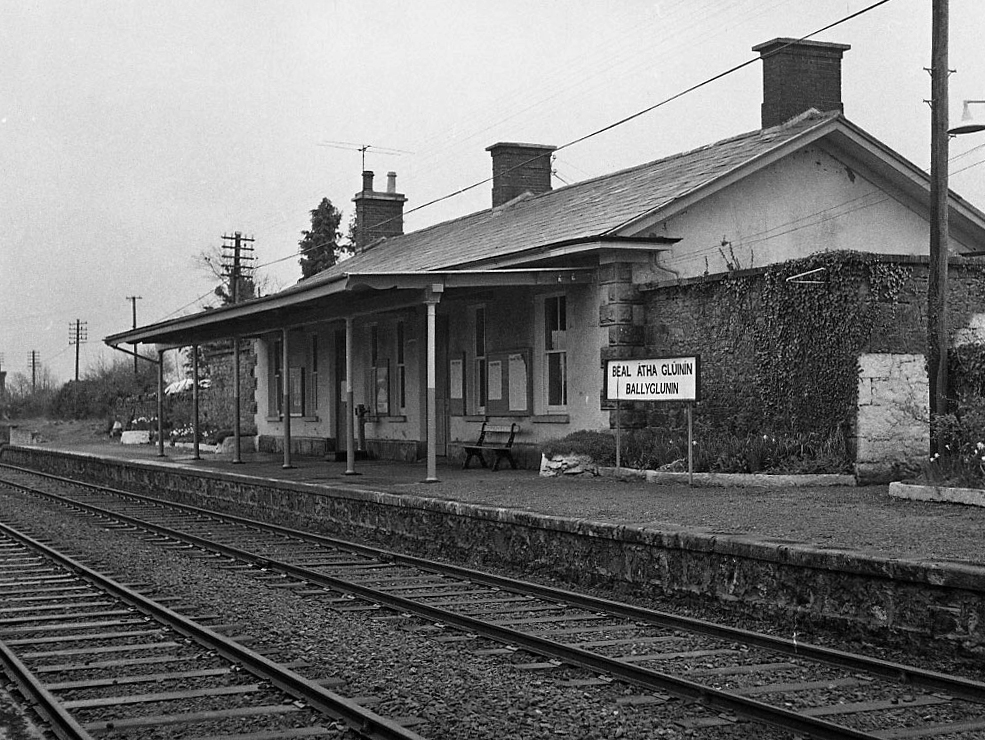
Ballyglunin station in 1976

Ballyglunin railway station, within Coolfowerbeg townland, was built by the Midland Great Western Railway company c. 1860. Closed, as an active railway station, since the 1970s, it was used as a filming location for The Quiet Man (1952) and now operates as a visitor centre.
