= Oranmore railway station =

Railway station in County Galway, Ireland

Oranmore Órán Mór
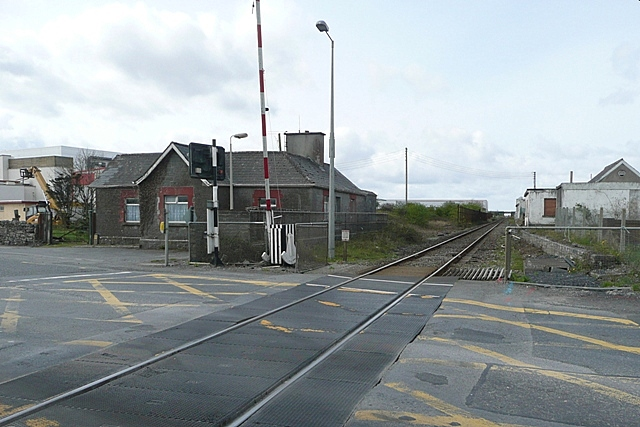
- Level crossing at Oranmore

General information
- Location: Gurraun South; Oranmore; Ireland
- Coordinates: 53.2758°N 8.9453°W
- Elevation: 12 metres (39 ft)
- Owner: Iarnród Éireann
- Operator: Iarnród Éireann
- Lines: Dublin-Westport/Galway; Limerick-Galway
- Platforms: 1
- Tracks: 1
- Bus operators: TFI Local Link
- Connections: 351

Construction
- Structure type: At-grade
- Parking: Yes
- Cycle facilities: Yes

Other information
- Station code: ORNMR
- Website: Irish Rail Oranmore Website

History
- Opened: August 28, 2013

Key dates
- August 1851: Original Station opened
- June 1963: Original Station closed

Services
Preceding station	IÉ	Following station
Athenry	InterCity; Dublin-Westport/Galway railway line	Galway
Athenry	InterCity; Western Rail Corridor	Galway
Athenry	Commuter; Galway Suburban Rail	Galway
Location

Oranmore railway station is a railway station that serves the town of Oranmore and its surrounding areas in County Galway, Ireland.

== Services ==
Oranmore is a stop on the Dublin – Galway intercity service and the Galway – Athenry/Athlone and Galway – Limerick Commuter services. Journey time is approximately 10 minutes from Oranmore to Galway Ceannt.

Bicycle parking and car parking facilities are provided. The 140 space car park at the station is owned and operated by Galway County Council.

From Oranmore along the Western Rail Corridor connecting trains in Limerick provide onward links to Limerick Junction (for Tipperary, and Waterford) and Cork.

== History ==
The original Oranmore station was opened in 1851 by the MGWR on its route from Dublin to Galway. The station was open until the rationalisation of the railway network by Córas Iompair Éireann saw it closed in 1963, with the building sold as a private residence.

== Development ==
The station serves as a park and ride for commuters into Galway. As a consequence of this, the old station was not rebuilt; instead, the new station is located at Garraun. Oranmore serves as an intermediate stop both for services to Galway from Limerick, and for the Galway Suburban Rail services from Athenry.

Oranmore was not included in the initial opening of Phase 1 of the Western Rail Corridor. Originally planned for opening in 2011. It reopened on Sunday 28 July 2013.
