= Athlone railway station =

Train stop in central Ireland

Athlone Baile Átha Luain
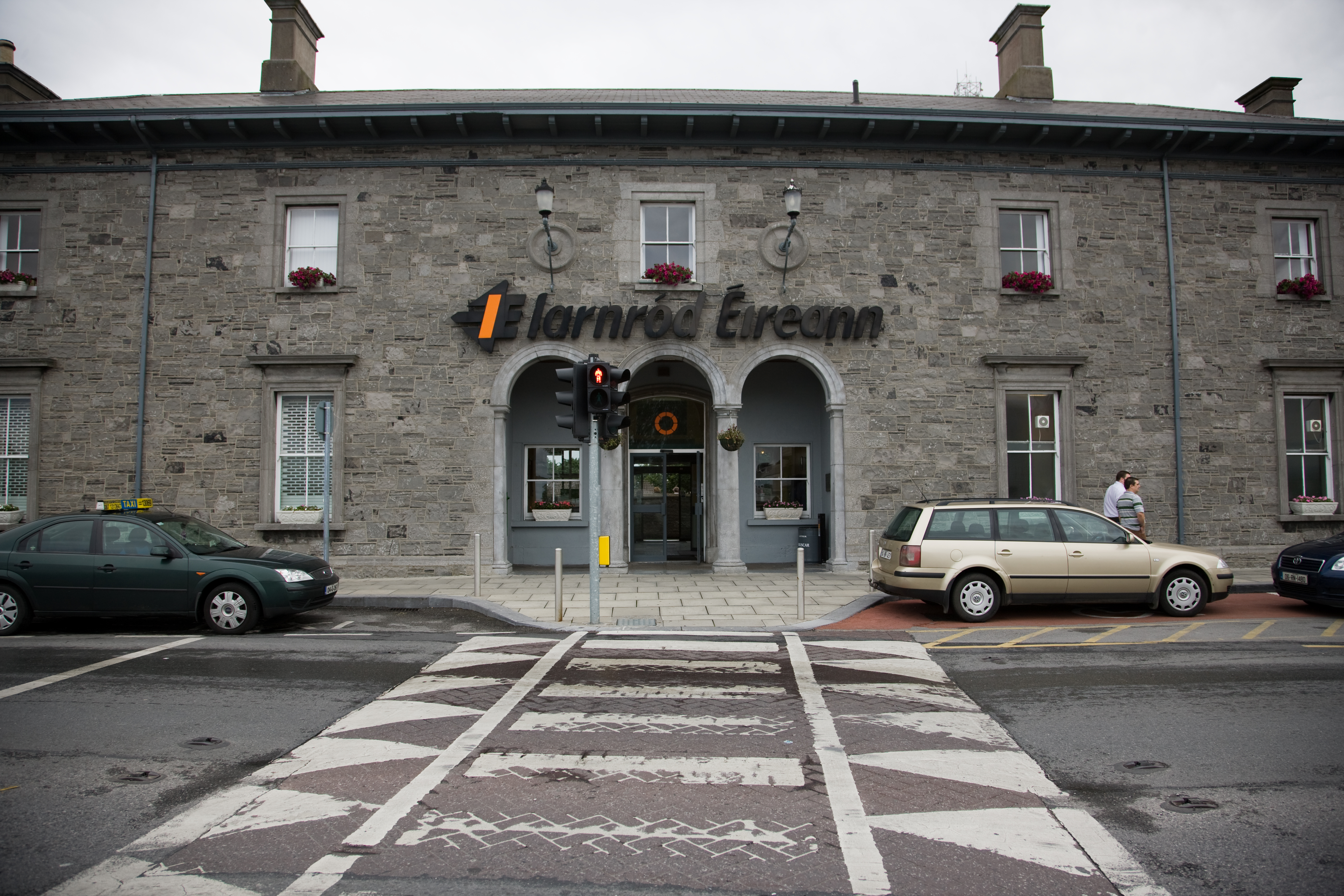

General information
- Location: Southern Station Road, Athlone; County Westmeath, N37 DF24; Ireland
- Coordinates: 53°25′36.7″N 7°56′08.4″W
- Owner: Iarnród Éireann
- Operator: Iarnród Éireann
- Platforms: 3
- Bus operators: Bus Eireann; TFI Local Link
- Connections: 70; 72; 73; 190; 440; 461; 466; 548; 815; 819; 850; A1; A2

Construction
- Structure type: At-grade

Other information
- Station code: ATLNE
- Fare zone: K

History
- Opened: 1859
Location

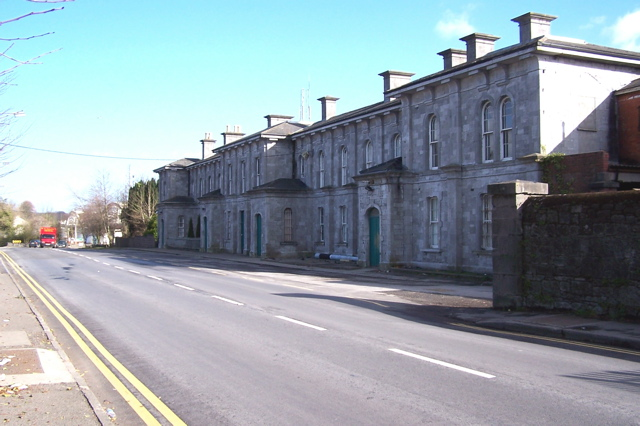
The old MGWR station, designed by John Skipton Mulvany.

Athlone railway station is a station which serves the town of Athlone in County Roscommon and County Westmeath. It is located in the town on the east side of the river Shannon.

The station is an interchange station between the Dublin-Galway and Dublin-Westport rail services. In addition it is located adjacent to the town's bus station.

There are three platforms, of which Numbers 2 and 3 are an island platform.

== History ==
Athlone has had two Railway stations of varying roles over time. They are on opposite sides of the River Shannon, connected by the White Bridge.

=== Midland Great Western Railway ===
The first of these was built by the Midland Great Western Railway and opened on 1 August 1851. Designed by John Skipton Mulvany, it has a long, rather austere façade, in an Italianate style. The two-storey building has a staggering seventeen-bay façade which is broken by four breakfronts. It connected Galway and Dublin via the MGWR mainline, which ran between Dublin Broadstone railway station, Mullingar and Athlone via Moate. Since 1985 it has served as engineering offices and stores for Irish Rail.

=== Great Southern and Western Railway ===
The second was opened in 1859 by the Great Southern and Western Railway that reached Galway via a branch of the Cork main line. For many years there was great rivalry between the two railway companies who developed the railway stations in Athlone but this was subsequently solved by arbitration.

In the 1920s this station was designated as the goods station for Athlone and served in that capacity until 1985 when it became the mainline railway station for the town. The design, by Wilkinson, is a simple but elegant Italianate style of five-bays and two storeys. The success of the design is in its simplicity and in the decorative features. The entrance with its three arches supported on Doric pillars and the attractive ashlar architraves on the windows all add elegance to this piece of Irish railway architecture.

=== Great Southern Railways ===
In 1924, the MGWR and GSWR were merged into a single company, Great Southern Railways, which rationalised all passenger services to Galway through the old MGWR station in Athlone, leaving the GSWR station primarily as a goods terminal. This changed in the 1970s and 1980s, when the national transport operator Córas Iompair Éireann switched most of its passenger services to the GSWR route via Portarlington, with the consequence that the old GSWR station was renovated and the MGWR station closed.

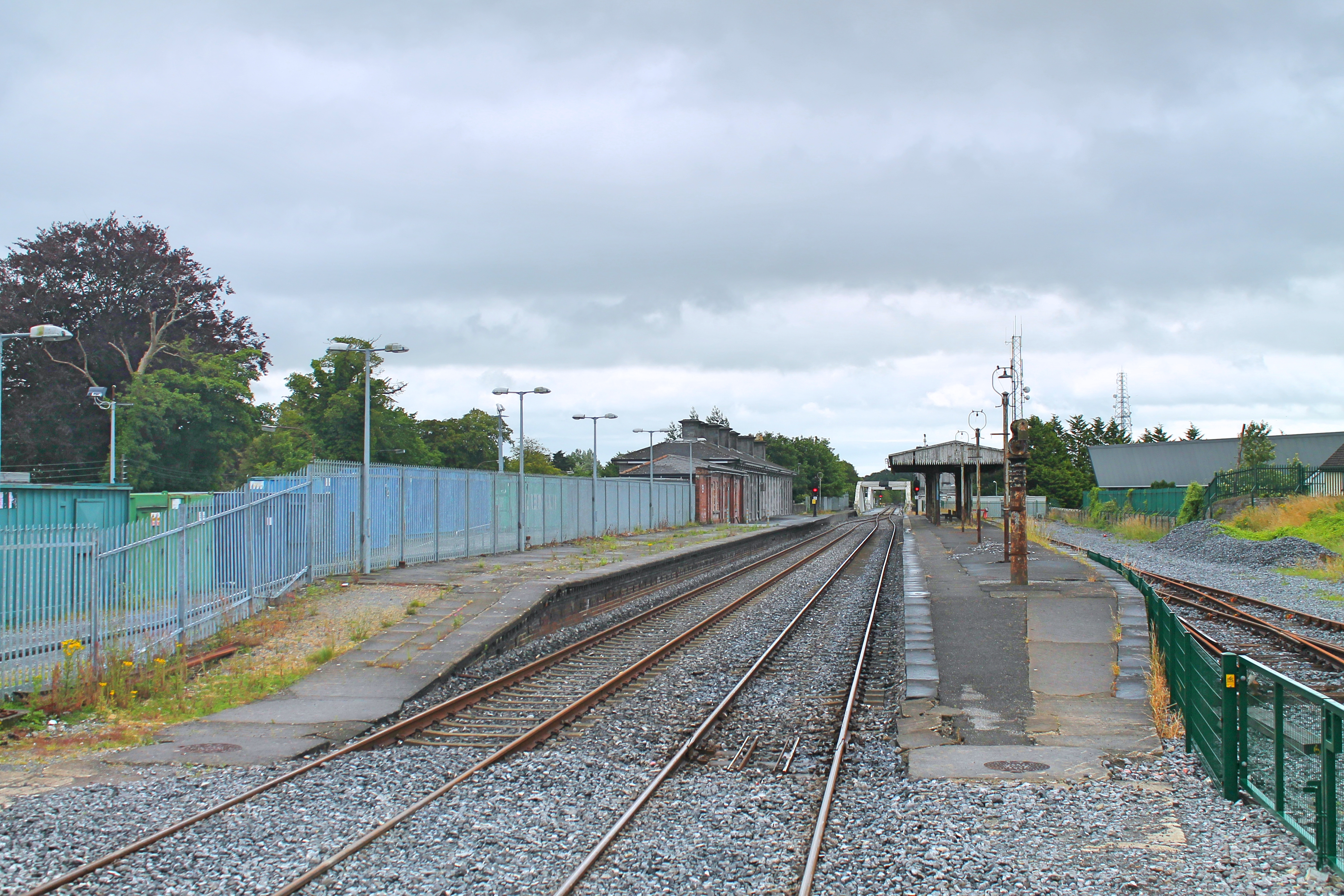
The closed MGWR station, seen from a passing train.

== See also ==
- List of railway stations in Ireland

Preceding station	Iarnród Éireann	Following station
Clara	InterCity; Dublin–Westport/Galway railway line (via Portarlington)	Ballinasloe
Clara	InterCity; Dublin–Westport/Galway railway line (via Ballyhaunis)	Roscommon
	Disused railways	
Moate; Line and station closed	Midland Great Western Railway; Dublin-Galway (via Mullingar)	Ballinasloe
