= Carlyle Crockwell =

Bermudian football referee

Carlyle Crockwell MBE
- Full name: Carlyle McNeil Eugene Crockwell
- Born: 22 February 1932; Bermuda
- Died: 28 June 2015 (aged 83)
- Other occupation: Retired
Years		Role

International
Years	League	Role

Carlyle McNeil Eugene Crockwell MBE (22 February 1932 – 28 June 2015) was a FIFA-certified Bermudian football referee.

== Early life ==
Crockwell (often referred to as Carlisle) was born in Bermuda in 1932, a great-grandson of the first Crockwell to settle in the British Overseas Territory, Barbados-born seaman and steam-engineer Robert Nathaniel Crockwell (also known as Robert Hughes). All of Bermuda's Crockwells descend from the children of his paternal grandparents, Bermudian-born mariner Robert Randolph Clark Crockwell and his wife, born Angelina Eleanor Wilmot, who raised their family in Pembroke East, near to North Village, Devonshire and in the shadow of Prospect Camp.

== Military career ==
His grandmother's father, David Wilmot, had been posted to the Bermuda Garrison as a Private soldier in what was to become the Duke of Cornwall's Light Infantry. Crockwell, like many of his relatives, emulated his military forebear by serving part-time in the army. His great-uncle, Adrian Wilmot (one of Bermuda's noted singers), had served on the Western Front during the First World War as a Gunner in the Bermuda Contingent of the Royal Garrison Artillery (a draft from the Bermuda Militia Artillery (BMA)). Carlyle Crockwell's father, also named Robert Nathaniel Crockwell, served in the BMA also from 1938 through the Second World War (as a Gunner, carrying out the duties of an NCO for the last two-and-a-half years of his service), as did Carlyle Crockwell himself and his brother Jerome A. Crockwell (a Lance-Corporal) throughout the 1950s. Crockwell enlisted in 1951 with the rank of Gunner, and was promoted to Sergeant in January, 1958, receiving his discharge in 1964 (the year before the Bermuda Militia Artillery amalgamated with the Bermuda Rifles to form the Bermuda Regiment (since 2015, the Royal Bermuda Regiment). He continued to be involved with military affairs even after his discharge. By 1962 he was the Secretary, and by 1972 the Chairman, of the Ex-Artillerymens' Association (this organisation had been formed between the two world wars by former soldiers who - at a time when motor vehicles were banned from Bermuda's roads - had difficulty commuting to St. George's Garrison, the location of the Bermuda Branch of the Royal Artillery Association). By 1994 he was the Charirman, and by 1996 the President, of the Bermudian Branch of the Royal Artillery Association.

Crockwell remained in Government service, working as an officer of Her Majesty's Prison Service, Bermuda (which was renamed the Department of Corrections in 2002). In 1977, when he was a Divisional Officer, he was appointed a Member of the Civil Division of the Most Excellent Order of the British Empire in the Silver Jubilee and Birthday Honours.

== Sporting career ==
Carlyle Crockwell brought his military discipline to football, becoming a long-serving member of the Bermuda Referees Association. He refereed Bermuda Football Association matches in Bermuda, as well as World Cup qualifiers for FIFA, the Pan American Games, and matches sanctioned by CONCACAF. The first international match he refereed as a FIFA official was a World Cup preliminary between Canada and the United States that took place in Newfoundland (two other Bermudian referees, Dave Parsons and Charles Marshall, were also present).

Crockwell was appointed an Honorary Vice-President of the Bermuda Football Association, and in 2001 an Honorary Life Vice-President.

Many of Carlyle Crockwell's relatives have also been active in football and other sports in Bermuda. His cousin, Custerfield Desmond Crockwell (a Police Inspector of the Bermuda Police Service), was a noted local boxer and cricket player. His son, Carlyle Crockwell Jr., was a goalkeeper for Pembroke Hamilton Club (PHC), and other sporting relatives include footballers Denzel Crockwell, of Ireland Rangers FC, Mikkail Kristopher Crockwell of Dandy Town Hornets, and cricketer Fiqre Crockwell.

== Death ==
Crockwell died after a lengthy illness on 28 June 2015.
