= Fiqre Crockwell =

Bermudian cricketer (1985–2016)

Personal information
- Full name: Fiqre Salassie Crockwell
- Born: 8 July 1985; Bermuda
- Died: 20 June 2016 (aged 30); Pembroke Parish, Bermuda
- Batting: Right-handed
- Role: Wicket-keeper

Career statistics
Competition	ODI	FC	LA	T20
Matches	2	3	15	5
Runs scored	68	45	237	142
Batting average	34.00	7.50	15.80	28.40
100s/50s	0/0	0/0	0/0	0/0
Top score	45	17	45	47
Catches/stumpings	0/–	1/–	8/–	4/–
- Source: CricketArchive, 26 January 2025

Fiqre Salassie Crockwell (8 July 1985 – 20 June 2016) was a Bermudian cricketer who represented the national team at One Day International level twice in April 2009. He was an opening batsman.

Crockwell's ODI appearances, along with three other matches which had List A but not ODI status, were all during Bermuda's unsuccessful 2009 ICC World Cup Qualifier campaign in South Africa. Crockwell's top score of 45 came in one of the ODIs, a match against Kenya.

Crockwell's sporting relatives include FIFA-certified referee Carlyle McNeil Eugene Crockwell and footballer Mikkail Kristopher Crockwell.

On 20 June 2016, Crockwell was found dead in the Pembroke parish area of Bermuda, shot by a gunman who was lying-in-wait. He was found fatally wounded shortly before 3 am.
