= Craughwell railway station =

Railway station in County Galway, Ireland

Craughwell Creachmhaoil
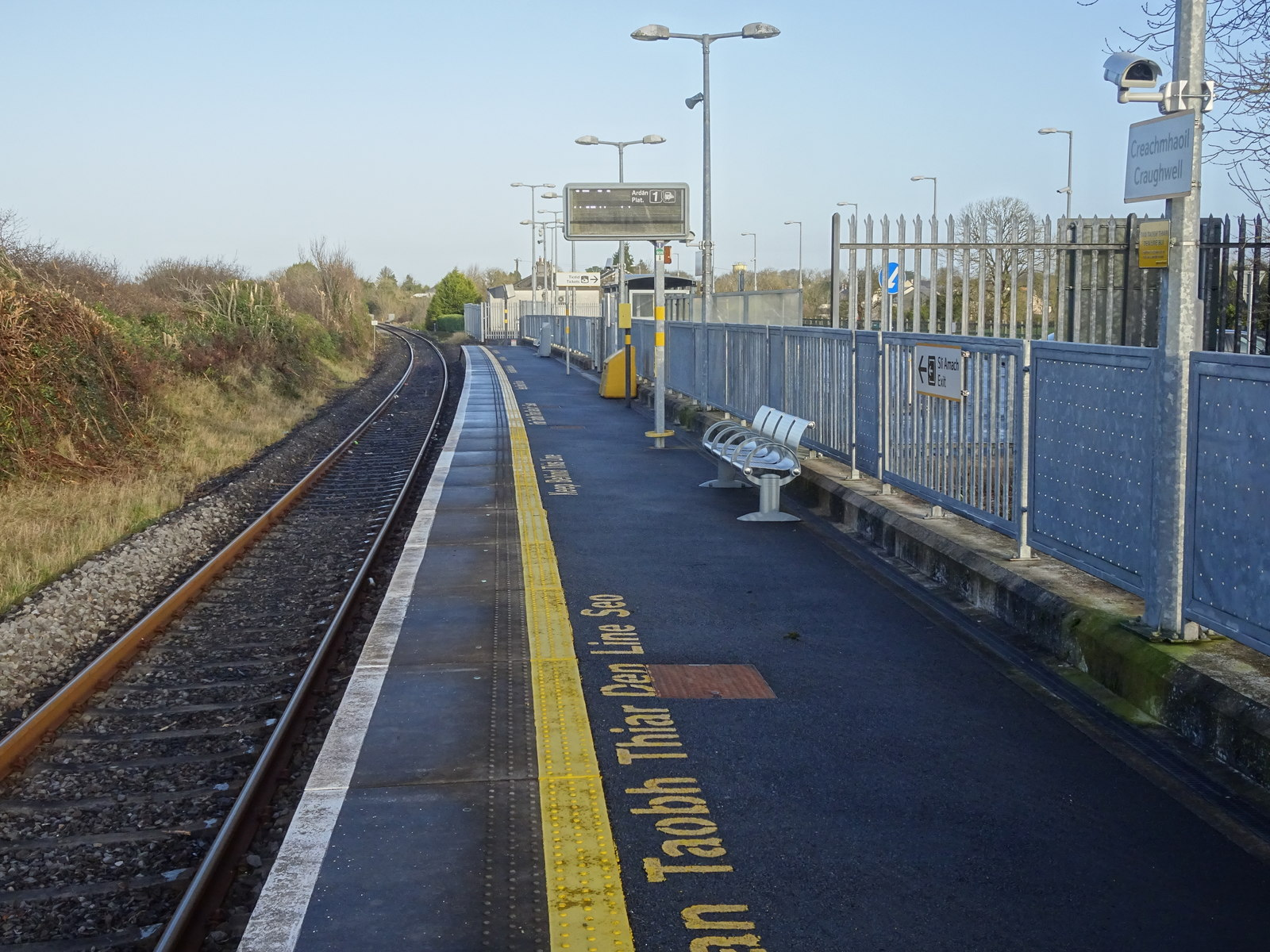
- Platform at Craughwell railway station

General information
- Location: Killora, Craughwell; County Galway; Ireland
- Coordinates: 53.2257°N 8.7350°W
- Elevation: 27 metres (89 ft)
- Owner: Iarnród Éireann
- Operator: Iarnród Éireann
- Line: Western Railway Corridor
- Platforms: 1
- Tracks: 1

Construction
- Structure type: At-grade
- Parking: Yes

Other information
- Website: Irish Rail Craughwell Website

History
- Opened: 1860s
- Closed: 1976
- Rebuilt: 2010
- Original company: Waterford, Limerick and Western Railway
- Post-grouping: Iarnród Éireann

Services
Preceding station	Iarnród Éireann	Following station
Ardrahan towards Limerick Colbert	InterCity Limerick–Galway	Athenry towards Galway Ceannt
Location

Craughwell railway station is a railway station serving the village of Craughwell in County Galway, Ireland. It is an unstaffed single-platform station.

== History ==
A station existed in the town (originally on the Waterford, Limerick and Western Railway) from the mid-19th century, until the closure to passengers of the line from Ennis-Athenry in 1976.

As part of Iarnród Éireann's Western Rail Corridor project, under the Transport 21 plan, Iarnród Éireann reopened the station, having built a new single platform facility and car park close to the original site.

In November 2026, construction tenders were issued for the extension of platforms at stations along the Galway-Limerick route. A 55m extension is planned for the platform at Craughwell, which will allow the station to be served by six-car trains. Work is expected to commence in the first quarter of 2027.
