= Mikkail Crockwell =

Bermudian footballer

Personal information
- Full name: Mikkail Kristopher Crockwell
- Date of birth: 20 February 1990 (age 36)
- Place of birth: St. David's, Bermuda
- Height: 6 ft 0 in (1.83 m)
- Position: Goalkeeper

Team information
- Current team: Dandy Town Hornets

College career
Years	Team	Apps	(Gls)
2010–2013	Thomas Terriers		

Senior career*
Years	Team	Apps	(Gls)
2007–2011	Dandy Town Hornets		
2011	Bermuda Hogges	4	(0)
2011–2013	St. David's Cricket Club		
2013–	Dandy Town Hornets		

International career^{‡}
2008–	Bermuda	2	(0)
- * Club domestic league appearances and goals as of July 11, 2011 ‡ National team caps and goals as of November 14, 2011

Mikkail Kristopher Crockwell (born 20 February 1990) is a Bermudian footballer who, as of 2015, was playing for local side Dandy Town Hornets.

== Club career ==
Crockwell played for Dandy Town Hornets and joined St. David's Cricket Club in 2011. He has also played for Bermuda Hogges in the USL Premier Development League and then played 73 matches of US college soccer for Thomas College, where he was voted NAC Defensive Player of the Year in 2012. He graduated in 2014 with a Bachelor of Science Degree in Management.

== International career ==
Crockwell was part of the Bermuda U-15 squad in 2007.

He made his senior debut for Bermuda in a June 2008 friendly match against Barbados and has, as of November 2015, earned a total of 2 caps, scoring no goals. He has represented his country in 1 FIFA World Cup qualification match.

== Personal life ==
Crockwell is a son of Lovette Zuill and has two sisters.

He is a relative of FIFA-certified referee Carlyle McNeil Eugene Crockwell and cricketer Fiqre Crockwell. He is also a Lance-Corporal in the Royal Bermuda Regiment.
