= Gort railway station =

Railway station in Ireland

Gort An Gort
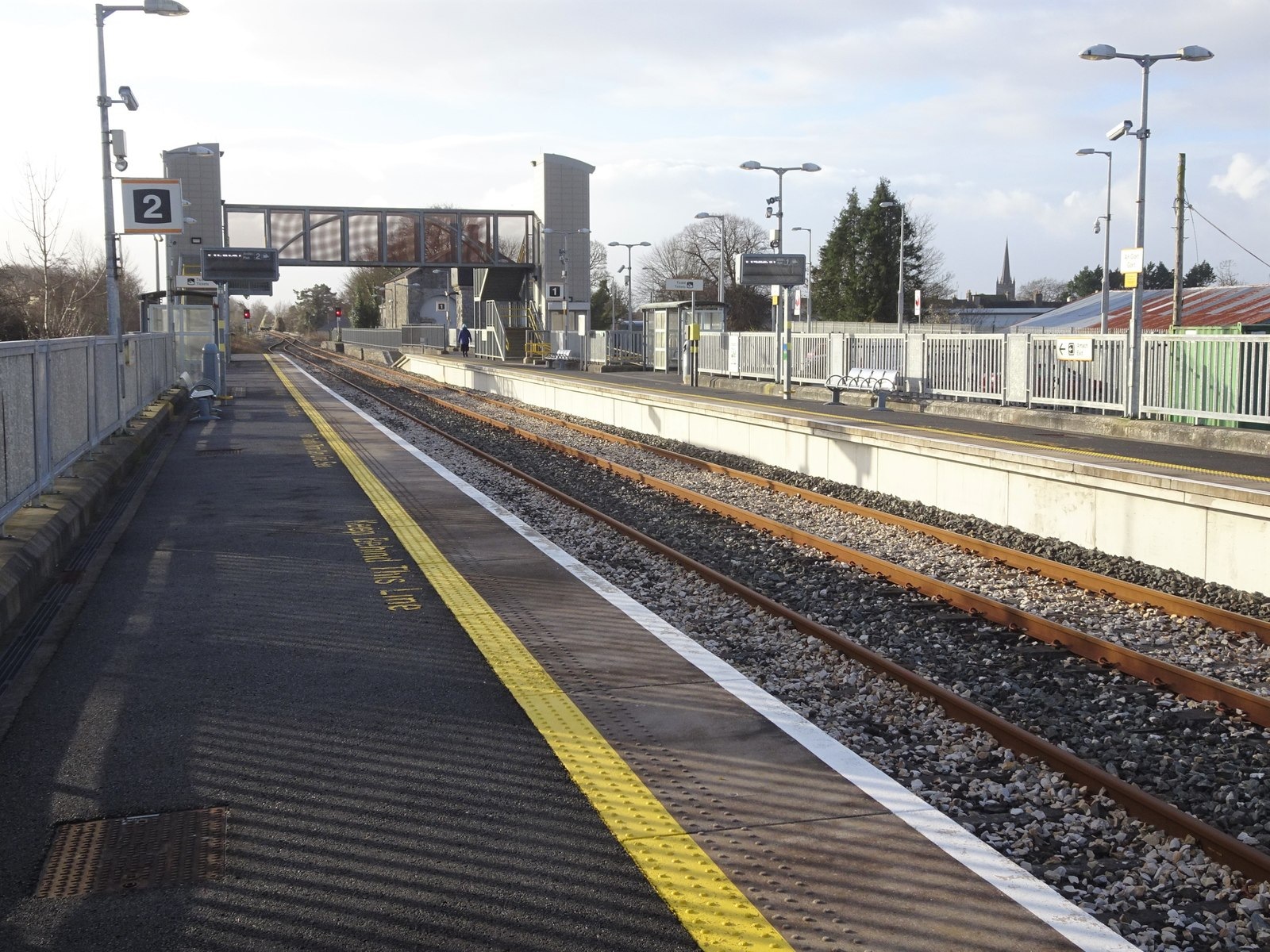
- Gort railway station, County Galway

General information
- Location: Gort, County Galway; Ireland
- Coordinates: 53°03′59″N 08°49′00″W
- Owner: Iarnród Éireann
- Operator: Iarnród Éireann

History
- Opened: 15 September 1869
- Closed: 5 April 1976
- Rebuilt: March 2010

Services
| Preceding station | Iarnród Éireann | Following station |
|---|---|---|
| Ennis | InterCity; Western Railway Corridor | Ardrahan |
Location

Gort railway station is a railway station that serves the town of Gort in County Galway, Ireland.

== History ==
The station originally opened on 15 September 1869 and closed on 5 April 1976. As part of Iarnród Éireann's Western Rail Corridor project, under the Transport 21 plan, Iarnród Éireann rebuilt the station. Work on Gort station was planned to start in 2008. However, an objection was raised by a local company on the basis of traffic hazards regarding the proposal to rebuild the old station. In January 2009, this objection was withdrawn, allowing Iarnród Éireann to begin work rebuilding the station. The new station opened in March 2010.

In November 2026, construction tenders were issued for the extension of platforms at stations along the Galway-Limerick route. A 55m extension is planned for the platforms at Gort, which will allow the station to be served by six-car trains. Work is expected to commence in the first quarter of 2027.
