= Ardrahan railway station =

Railway station in Ardrahan, Ireland

Ardrahan Ard Raithin
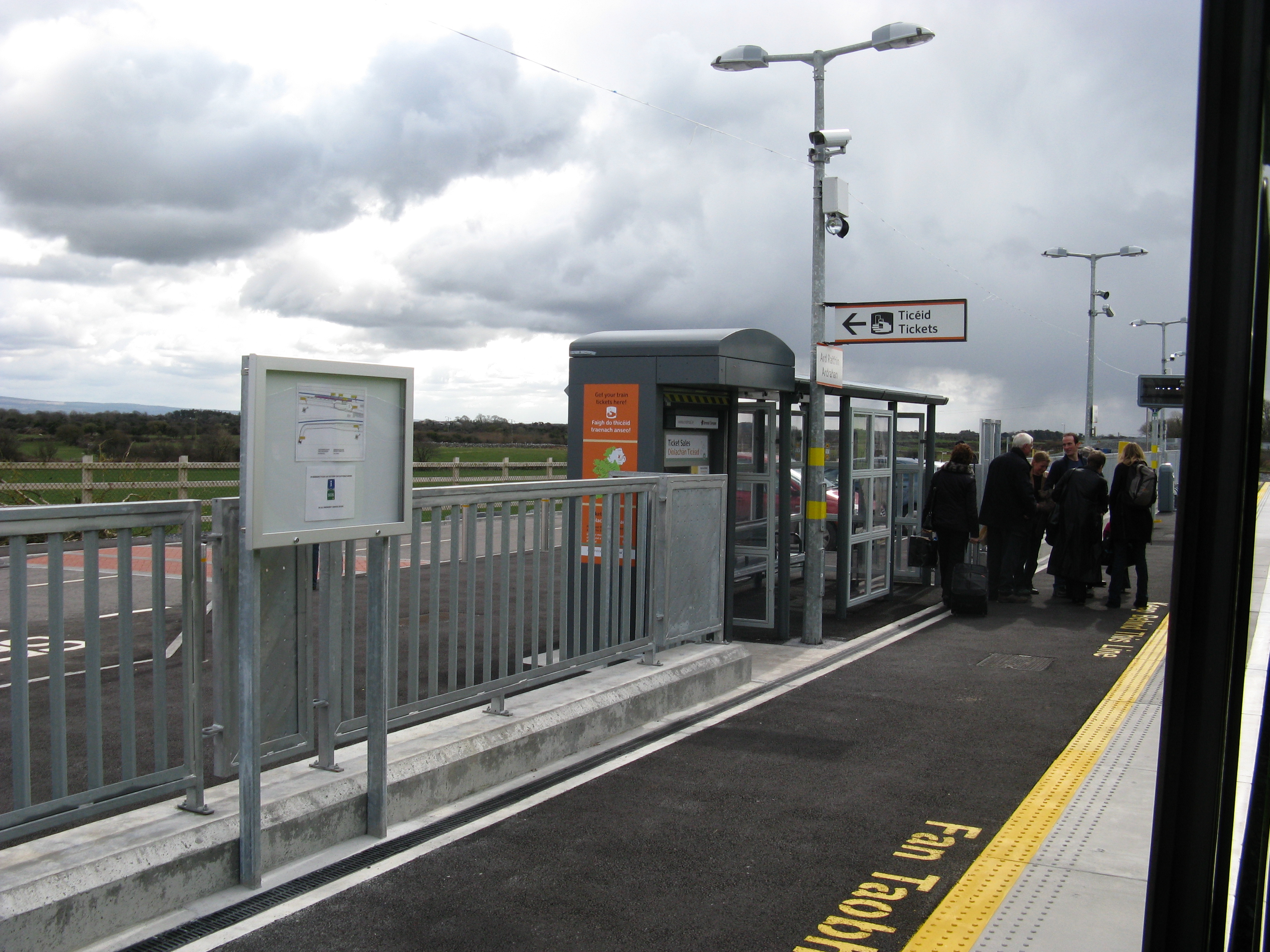

General information
- Location: Caherdaly, Ardrahan; County Galway, H91 WY9V; Ireland
- Coordinates: 53.16°N 8.81°W
- Owner: Iarnród Éireann
- Operator: Iarnród Éireann
- Platforms: 1

Construction
- Structure type: At-grade

Other information
- Station code: ARHAN, 183

History
- Opened: 15 September 1869
- Closed: 5 April 1976
- Rebuilt: March 2010

Services
| Preceding station | Iarnród Éireann | Following station |
|---|---|---|
| Gort | InterCity; Western Railway Corridor | Craughwell |
Location

Ardrahan railway station serves the village of Ardrahan in County Galway, Ireland.

== History ==
Opened by the Athenry and Ennis Junction Railway, at the beginning of the 20th century the station was run by the Great Southern and Western Railway and then Great Southern Railways.

The station was then passed to the Córas Iompair Éireann as a result of the Transport Act 1944 which took effect from 1 January 1945. Passenger services ceased in 1976.

== The site today ==
The line through the station was rebuilt as part of the Western Railway Corridor, the station reopening to passengers in March 2010.

In November 2026, construction tenders were issued for the extension of platforms at stations along the Galway-Limerick route. A 55m extension is planned for the platform at Ardrahan, which will allow the station to be served by six-car trains. Work is expected to commence in the first quarter of 2027.

== See also ==
- List of railway stations in Ireland
