= Dublin–Westport/Galway railway line =

West-east Irish transport link

Dublin–Westport Main Line Galway Main Line
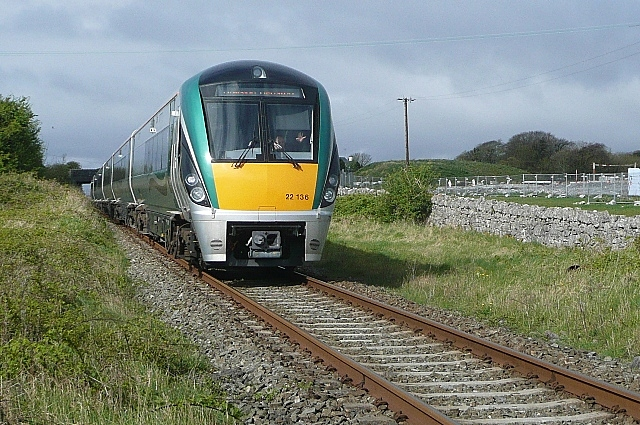
- An ICR 22136 on the Rosshill level crossing on the Galway to Dublin service.

Overview
- Status: Operational
- Owner: Iarnród Éireann
- Locale: Ireland
- Termini: Dublin Heuston; Westport Galway Ceannt
- Stations: 13 (to Galway); 12 (13 in exchange; to Westport)

Service
- Type: Commuter rail, Inter-city rail Heavy rail
- System: Iarnród Éireann
- Services: InterCity: Dublin–Galway; Dublin–Westport; Limerick–Galway; Commuter: Galway Suburban Rail
- Operator(s): Iarnród Éireann
- Rolling stock: 22000 Class

History
- Opened: 1847

Technical
- Line length: Portarlington–Athlone: 63 kilometres (39 mi); Athlone–Galway: 78.46 kilometres (48.75 mi); Athlone–Westport: 133.374 kilometres (82.875 mi)
- Number of tracks: Single track
- Character: Primary
- Track gauge: 1,600 mm (5 ft 3 in) Irish gauge
- Operating speed: Portarlington–Athlone: 160 km/h (100 mph); Athlone–Galway: 145 km/h (90 mph); Athlone–Westport: 110 km/h (68 mph)
Route map
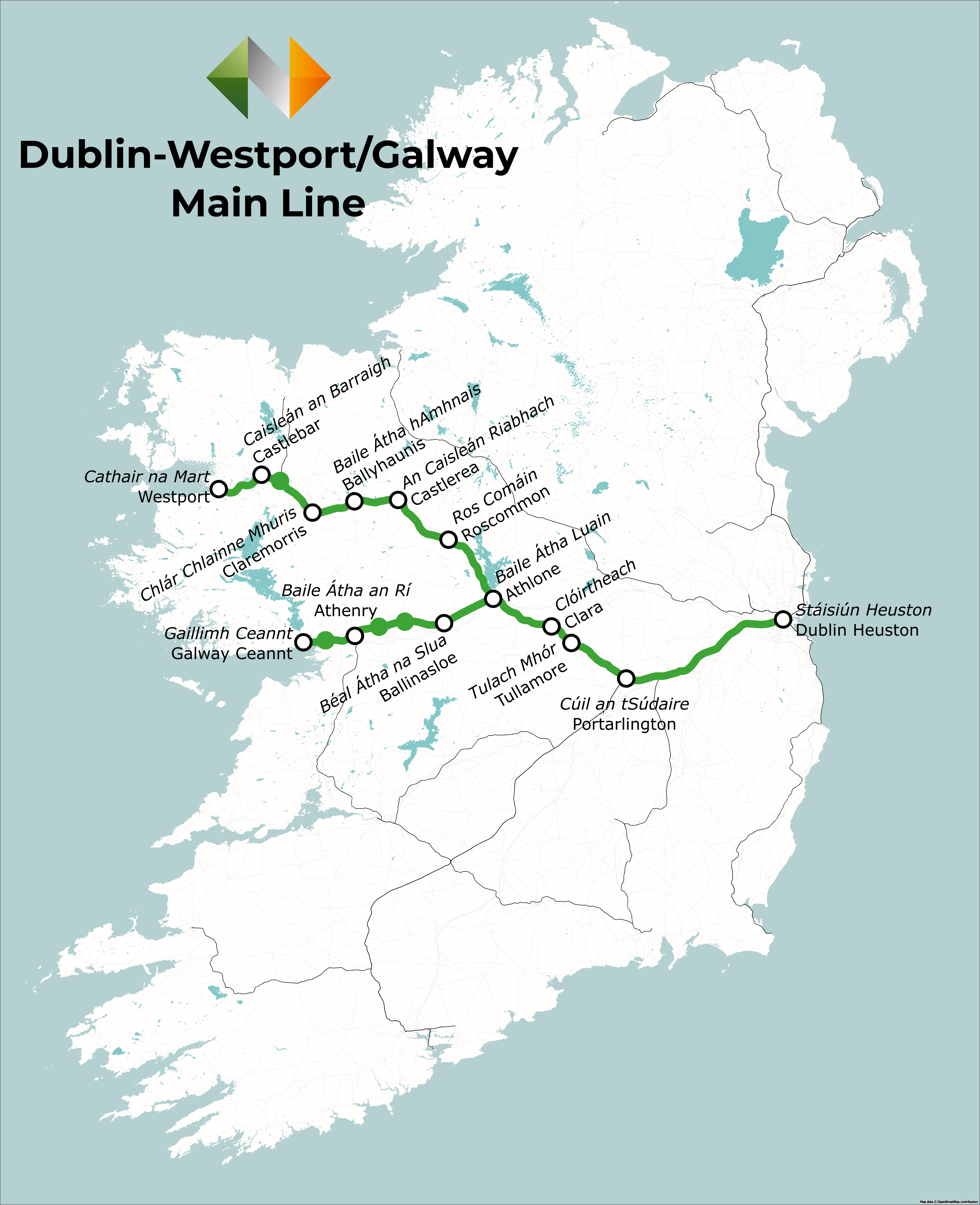
(Click to expand)

The Dublin-Westport/Galway line is a major railway route from Dublin to Galway or Westport, County Mayo. The line is part of the greater intercity rail network formed by branches of the main line between Dublin and Cork. The route to Westport and Galway branches away from the main line at Portarlington in County Laois and continues as far as Athlone in County Westmeath, where it splits again, with one branch to Westport and the other to Galway.

== Westport line ==
The Westport line was opened by the MGWR in 1866 to serve what was then a major port. At this point, services ran from Broadstone station in Dublin via Mullingar. However, the GSWR route reached Athlone in 1859, which gave a second route from Kingsbridge station. Following the rationalisation of the railway network by Córas Iompair Éireann, the GSWR route was made the main route from Dublin to the west coast after 1973.

== Galway line ==
The Galway line was opened by the MGWR in 1851, which became the primary route to the west coast city from Dublin. The GSWR route to Athlone opened in 1859, but the company also ran another route in the west of the country, when it purchased the Waterford, Limerick and Western Railway, which operated the Waterford-Collooney route that called at Athenry. In 1973, CIÉ made the former GSWR route the main one to Galway, with services on the old MGWR line slowly withdrawn, until they were ended in 1987.

== Today ==
As of March 2018 all services to both Westport and Galway are operated under the Intercity brand using the former GSWR route from Dublin Heuston. Services are operated by Iarnród Éireann's 22000 Class DMU. There are nine trains daily in each direction to and from Dublin and Galway on Monday to Thursday with 8 from Heuston to Galway and nine from Galway to Dublin. On Saturday there are 9 trains from Heuston to Galway and 8 from Galway to Heuston. On Sunday there are 6 trains in each direction from Heuston to Galway. There are 4 trains from Heuston to Westport Monday to Thursday and 5 from Westport to Heuston. On Friday there are 5 trains in each direction. On Saturday and Sunday there are 3 trains from Heuston to Westport and 4 from Westport to Heuston. These trains usually operate in 3 to 7 car ICR trains.

=== Future ===
Reopening the Loughrea route and Athlone to Mullingar line would shorten the journeys. Trains would come to and from Connolly Station as well.
