= Western Rail Corridor =

Irish transport link

Western Railway Corridor
- Railway lines in the west of Ireland. The Western Railway Corridor, and other ex-GSWR lines, are in green. The lines in red are ex-MGWR lines.

Overview
- Status: Operational
- Locale: West of Ireland
- Coordinates: 52.659°N 8.624°W
- Termini: Limerick; Athenry (2010-present) Sligo (1895–1963) Claremorris (1963–1976)
- Stations: 7

Service
- Type: Commuter rail, Inter-city rail Heavy rail
- System: Iarnród Éireann
- Services: InterCity: Limerick–Galway; Commuter: Limerick–Ennis
- Operator: Iarnród Éireann
- Rolling stock: 2800 Class (Commuter); 22000 Class (InterCity)
- Ridership: 770,000 (as of 2025)

History
- Opened: 2 July 1859
- Completed: 1 October 1895
- Closed: 5 April 1976 (Passenger); February 2000 (Freight)
- Reopened: 30 March 2010

Technical
- Line length: 60.375 miles (97.164 km) (Operational track only)
- Num of tracks: Single track
- Track gauge: 1,600 mm (5 ft 3 in) Irish gauge
- Operating speed: 50 miles per hour (80 km/h) (Limerick–Ennis); 80 miles per hour (130 km/h) (Ennis–Athenry)

The Western Rail Corridor, or Western Railway Corridor, is a partly disused railway line running through the west of Ireland. Currently two sections of the line, from Limerick via Ennis to Athenry and from Collooney to Sligo, see regular services, with other sections either closed or only technically classed as open.

== History ==
=== Historical background ===
The 240km stretch of rail from Limerick to Sligo that is today known as the Western Railway Corridor (WRC), was originally constructed over a period of approximately 40 years in the latter half of the 19th century, with the first section from Limerick to Ennis being completed in 1859, and the final stretch from Claremorris to Collooney being finished in 1895. Various private railway companies were involved in the construction of the different parts of the line, who contracted the Waterford and Limerick Railway to operate services between Limerick and Sligo. All were eventually absorbed into the W&LR, which rebranded to the Waterford Limerick and Western Railway to reflect the expansion. Through a series of amalgamations in the 20th century, the WRC ended up under state ownership as part of CIÉ in 1950.

=== Closures ===
In 1956, an inquiry committee into the affairs of CIÉ, headed by economist Dr. James Beddy, was established by the government, to investigate the increasing public funds being used by country's railway network. The committee published their report in May 1957, which recommended the closure of 65% of all railway lines and 75% of all stations. 1963 saw the withdrawal of most of the scheduled passenger services along the WRC. Galway-Limerick services, Tuam-Galway services, and all passenger trains between Claremorris and Sligo were terminated. The only remaining passenger service was a single daily return service between Ballina and Limerick. This service to Ballina ceased in 1976, with the daily train only travelling between Limerick and Ennis until the entire service was ultimately withdrawn a year later, leaving the entire WRC without any scheduled passenger trains.

Ballina-Limerick passenger train passing through Gort in 1976 before the service ceased

Freight services continued on parts of the WRC after passenger services were withdrawn. On the Claremorris to Colooney line, freight trains continued to operate after 1963, with the final services occurring in October 1975. Since then, the section between Claremorris and Collooney has seen no trains, with the exception of two unusual movements in 1981 and 1988 (an inspection train and the transfer of carriages for the railway museum in Kiltimagh). On the Mayo-Limerick stretch of the line, freight trains continued until February 2000, when the last service, a fertiliser train between Limerick and Ballina, ceased operating, marking the first time in 140 years that the Western Rail Corridor was without any train services.

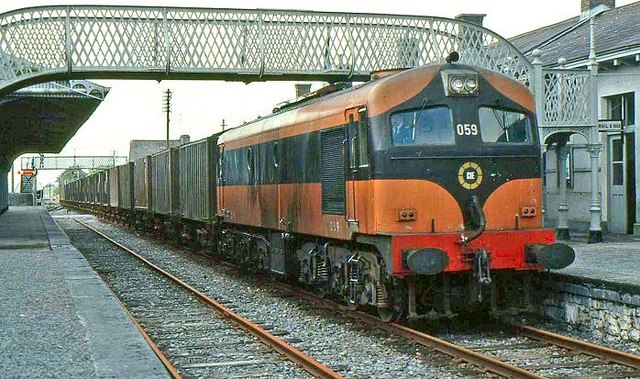
An Asahi Liner freight train stopped in Tuam in 1985, travelling between Ballina and Foynes

=== Campaign for reopening ===
In 2003, community campaign group West on Track was formed with the aim of preserving and eventually reopeing the Western Rail Corridor. The group received the backing of local authorities, chambers of commerce, trade unions and development groups, and collected in excess of 100,000 signatures on a petition in support of reopening the railway, which was presented to the Minister for Transport at the time, Seamus Brennan, at Kiltimagh station in 2004. In June of that year, Minister Brennan established an expert working group, headed by Pat McCann, to examine the prospect of reopening the WRC. The report was published in May 2005, and found that "there is a strong case for the restoration of significant sections of this line", and recommended that the Limerick-Galway and Galway-Mayo lines be restored, with the Mayo-Sligo line to be preserved and re-evaluated in the future.

2005 McCann report phased reopening recommendations and estimated costs:
Section	Length	Estimated costs
Phase 1: Ennis to Athenry	58 km / 36 miles	€74.7 million
Phase 2: Athenry to Tuam	25 km / 15.5 miles	€34.7 million
Phase 3: Tuam to Claremorris	27 km / 17 miles	€58.9 million
Phase 4: Claremorris to Collooney	74.5 km / 46.3 miles	€197.4 million

In November 2005, the government launced its Transport 21 national infrastructure plan, which contained a commitment to reopen the WRC from Ennis to Claremorris, with the following planned timeline:

- 2009 – Opening of Ennis-Athenry section
- 2011 – Opening of Athenry-Tuam section
- 2014 – Opening of Tuam-Claremorris section

=== Reopening of Limerick-Galway line ===
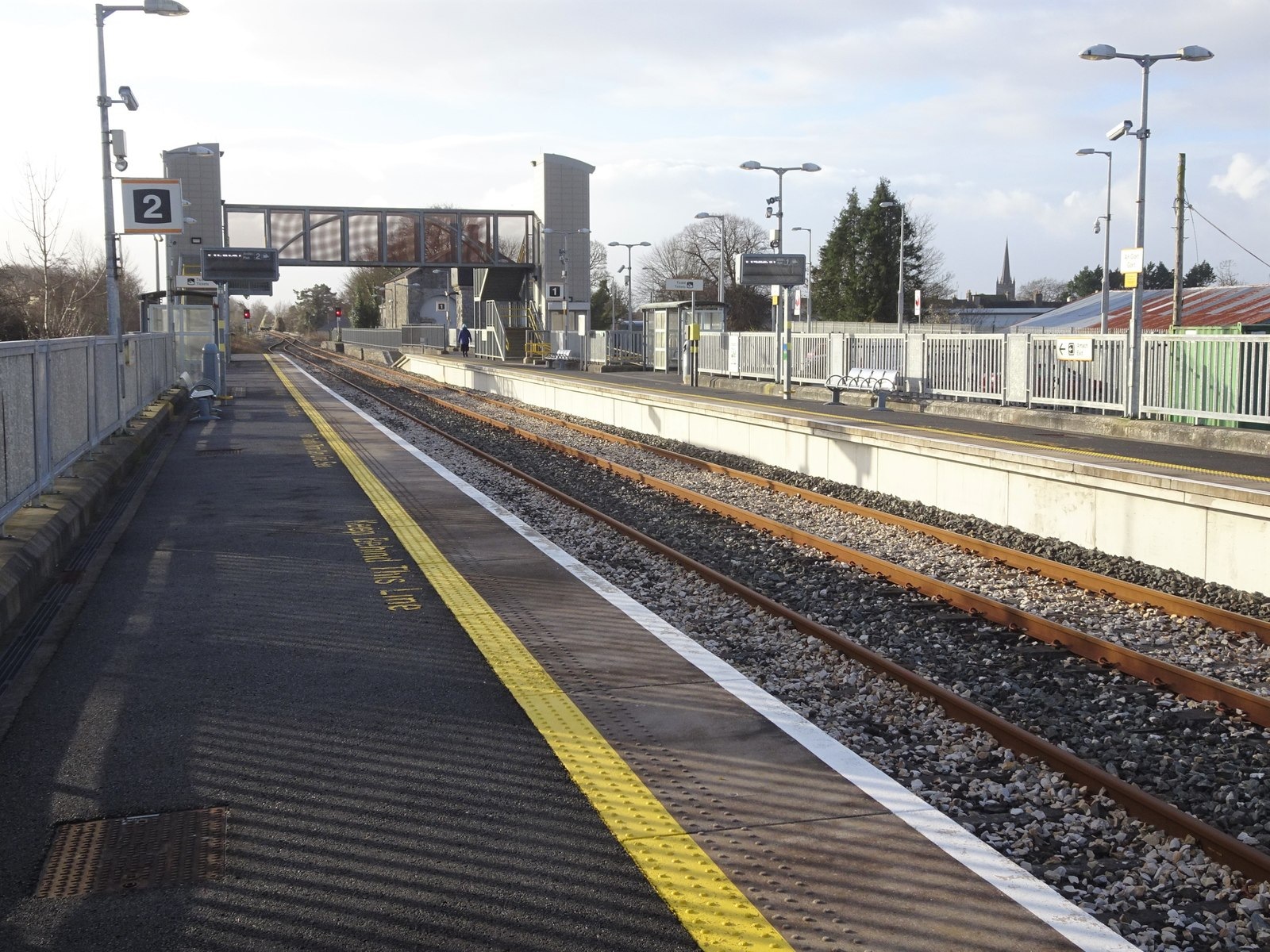
Gort station, reopened in 2010

In September 2006, the government approved funding for the restoration of the Western Rail Corridor, and gave Iarnród Éireann the go-ahead to commence the project. The first tracks were re-laid in November 2007, and the line was officially reopened on the 29th of March 2010, within budget at a cost of €106 million, reconnecting Galway and Limerick cities by rail, serving Ennis, Sixmilebridge, Gort, Ardrahan, Craughwell and Athenry along the way, and representing the first passenger trains on the line in 34 years.

=== Recession and halt of progress ===
After the reopening of the Limerick-Galway line, Iarnród Éireann expressed uncertainty over when work on the sections between Athenry, Tuam and Claremorris could progress, due to the difficulties with state finances at the time.

In comments on Midwest radio on 22 December 2014, then Taoiseach Enda Kenny said that the Western Rail corridor was "not going to happen in the foreseeable future" and that "this is not going to happen" when asked about the Western Rail Corridor.

Following those remarks, in January 2015 Kenny said at a press briefing in Lough Lannagh in Castlebar told local media in Mayo that he still saw the potential for developing freight services on the line stating, "I still see potential [on the Western Rail Corridor] from a freight point of view".

=== Planned reopening of Galway-Mayo line ===
In 2024, the government published the All-Island Strategic Rail Review which recommended the reopening of the Athenry to Claremorris rail line. The review noted that this would provide an improved link for the island's rail freight network, and that the town of Tuam would probably generate demand for a passenger service. The possibility of reinstating the Claremorris to Colooney line was not examined in the review. In November 2025, it was announced by Minister of State for Transport, Seán Canney, that the Athenry to Claremorris line would be reopened and that funding had been secured to commence works "within the next 18 months".

== Progress of works ==
=== Mayo-Galway line ===
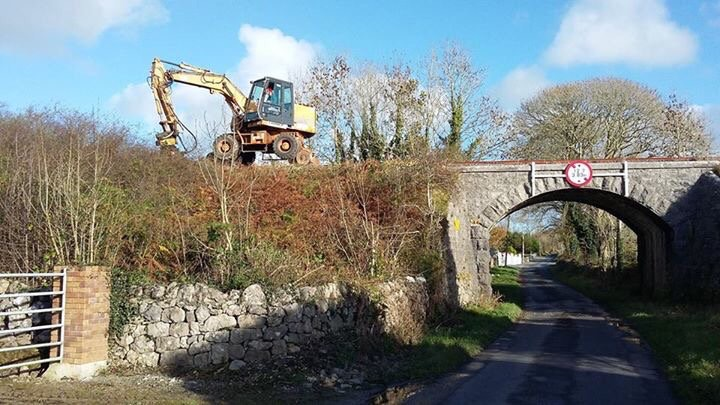
Line clearance at Athenry on Western Rail Corridor - November 2015

In November 2025, funding for the reopening of the line between Athenry and Claremorris was granted, with Minister of State for Transport, Seán Canney stating that the project was designated as a targeted priority in the Department of Transport’s National Development Plan and that works on the line could commence within 18 months from the announcement. As of early 2026, preliminary clearance works had begun on the line near Ballyglunin and Tuam station, and in September, work underway also included detailed structural surveys of bridges and embankments along with work on reinstating the bridge in Ballyglunin. Major enabling works are due to take place in 2027, with funding provided for construction to commence in 2028.

=== Other improvements ===
In October 2022, Iarnród Éireann and the government, under the Department of Transport's Pathfinder Programme, announced a study for a train station to be built in Moyross, a suburb on the northside of Limerick City. A public consultation on its location was undertaken in mid-2024, and a planning application for the proposed Moyross station was submitted in August 2025.

In April 2026, construction work started on a new 1km passing loop and platform at Oranmore railway station, which is expected to allow a doubling of services to Galway city along the currently single line track. The works are planned to be completed by the end of 2027.

In November 2026, construction tenders were issued for the extension of platforms at stations along the Galway-Limerick route. A 55m extension is planned for Gort, Ardrahan and Craughwell and a 12m extension for Ennis, with the intent of allowing trains with up to six cars to operate along the route. Work is expected to commence in the first quarter of 2027.

== Services ==
=== Current services ===
A Limerick-Galway train stopped in Athenry

The current services on the Western Rail Corridor are an intercity passenger service between Galway Ceannt and Limerick Colbert railway station, with 5 services each way Monday-Saturday, and 4 each way on Sunday. There are also commuter services, which provide an additional 4 services each way between Limerick and Ennis railway station, and an additional 6 services each way between Athenry and Galway city.

=== Potential future services ===
The planned reopening of the Athenry-Claremorris line is expected to allow passenger services connecting Mayo towns such as Claremorris, Castlebar and Westport with Athenry and by extension, Galway and Limerick, with discussions occurring about a potential direct service between Westport and Galway city.

The reopening is also expected to allow freight traffic from Mayo to access the Port of Waterford without using congested lines near Dublin, as well as Foynes Port via the reopened Limerick-Foynes railway line.

== Patronage ==
In 2011, The Irish Examiner reported that passenger numbers were "still quite low" in 2010.

Four years after the opening of the route an online booking facility was introduced in December 2013. On 6 January 2015, Iarnród Éireann reported that following the introduction of online booking and new adult fares, passenger numbers on the Galway-Limerick railway (Western Rail Corridor) for 2014 were in excess of 220,000, including a 72.5 per cent increase in passenger journeys through the Ennis- Athenry section of the line.

The Irish Times noted the 2015 figures as follows "Of particular note was the growth in passenger numbers on the western rail corridor, which saw a 72.5 per cent increase from 29,000 to 50,000 journeys through the Ennis-Athenry section of the line". By 2017, the Ennis-Athenry section carried nearly 100,000 passengers.

In 2025, the Western Rail Corridor reportedly carried approximately 770,000 passengers.

Passenger Numbers Since Reopening
Year	Passenger Numbers
2010	185,254
2011	224,166
2012	235,555
2013	219,209
2014	225,116
2015	278,532
2016	289,323
2017	352,706
2018	457,688
2019	531,336
2020	N/A
2021	N/A
2022	584,469
2023	626,824
2024	735,166
2025	770,000

== Collooney-Bellaghy section as a greenway ==
The idea of opening a greenway on the section of the Claremorris-Collooney line within Sligo has been mooted since at least 2015, with the idea being supported by the Sligo Greenway Cooperative. Three public consultations were carried out, but in December 2024, Iarnród Éireann informed Sligo County Council that they could not support the development of the council's preferred route of a greenway centred on the railway alignment, but would support a greenway running parallel to the tracks. In December 2025, Sligo County Council deemed that the alongside option was not feasible to them, due to a requirement to acquire private land and an increased ecological impact, effectively shelving the project.

In November 2025, Minister of State for Transport, Seán Canney reportedly again ruled out the possibility of the line becoming a greenway, stating that it was "preserved for rail use".

== Sligo to Derry ==
The idea for the development of a North-Western Rail Corridor is the suggested construction of a railway connecting Sligo, Bundoran, Ballyshannon, Donegal Town, Letterkenny and Derry, where it would connect with the Belfast-Derry railway line. This proposal, however, is not included in the TEN-T European Transport policy. An alternative route that has been suggested is the reopening of a line from Sligo through Enniskillen to Omagh where it would reconnect with the restored Portadown-Derry Railway known as the "Derry Road". The All-Island Strategic Rail Review, published in 2024, recommended the reopening of the Derry Road railway.

== See also ==
- Rail transport in Ireland
- History of rail transport in Ireland
- Wild Atlantic Way
