= Galway railway station =

Railway station in Ireland

Galway Ceannt Stáisiún Cheannt
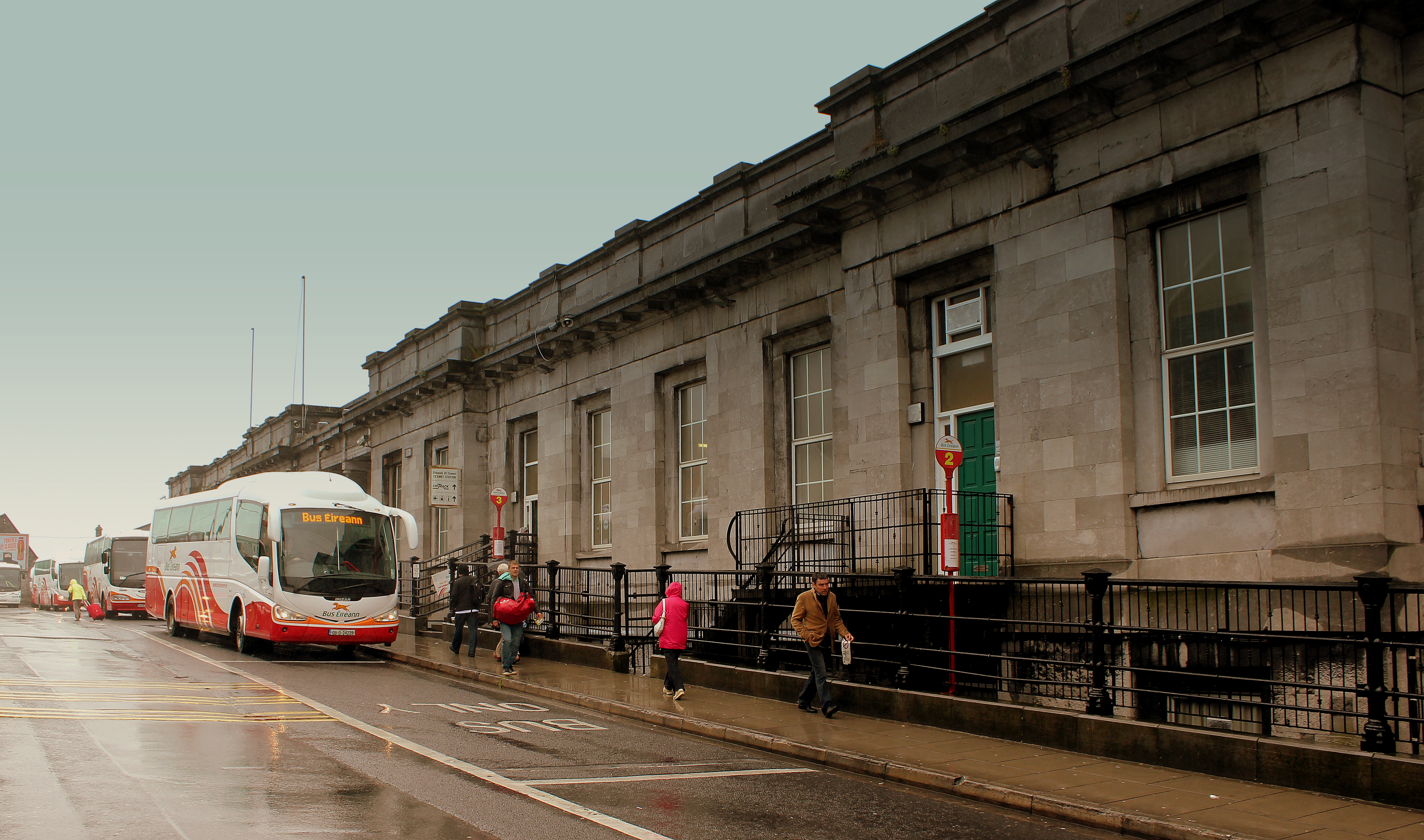
- Galway Ceannt Station

General information
- Location: Station Road; Galway; Ireland
- Coordinates: 53.2736°N 9.0468°W
- Elevation: 10 metres (33 ft)
- System: Regional
- Owner: Iarnród Éireann
- Operator: Iarnród Éireann
- Lines: Dublin-Westport/Galway; Limerick-Galway
- Platforms: 2
- Bus operators: Bus Éireann; Citylink
- Connections: 51; 52; 64; 65; 251; 350; 417; 419; 424; 425; 425A; 429; 434; 456

Construction
- Structure type: At-grade
- Parking: Yes
- Cycle facilities: Yes
- Accessible: Yes
- Architect: John Skipton Mulvany

Other information
- Station code: GALWY
- Fare zone: P
- Website: Irish Rail page on Ceannt Station

History
- Opened: 1 August 1851
Location

Galway Railway Station (Ceannt Station, Irish: Stáisiún Cheannt) is a railway station which serves the city of Galway in County Galway. The station is located in Eyre Square.

It is the terminus station for the Dublin to Galway intercity service and the Limerick to Galway and Athenry to Galway commuter services.

== Description ==
There are two platforms at Galway Ceannt; Platform 1 and Platform 2. Platform 2 can only be reached via Platform 1. Platform 1 is used for terminating/departing trains to Dublin Heuston while Platform 2 (a much shorter platform) is used for departing Limerick services.

The services which are provided at the station include ticket machines, a booking office, heated waiting rooms, toilets, a café (Starbucks), vending machines, and a telephone box.

The station also serves as the Bus Éireann depot for Galway City.

== History ==
The station was originally planned to be constructed in Renmore, however, the railway authorities were convinced by Fr. Peter Daly to construct the Lough Atalia Bridge to bring trains into Eyre Square. The bridge was designed by Midland Great Western Railway Engineer in Chief George Willoughby Hemans and the iron castings were supplied by James Stephens Iron Works and engineered by CW Stephens in 1851.

The station opened on 1 August 1851 and was designed by John Skipton Mulvany, who also designed the adjacent Hardiman Hotel, which was opened on 16 August 1852. The original roof was designed by iron founder Richard Turner.

This made Galway the western terminus of the Midland Great Western Railway giving the city a direct main line to its Broadstone Station terminus in Dublin.

As the 19th century progressed the rail network in Connacht was expanded, making Galway an important railhead. The nearby town of Athenry became a railway junction, giving Galway links to Ennis, Limerick and the south in 1869 and Sligo and the north in 1894. In 1895 the MGW opened an extension between Galway and Clifden.

The 20th century brought increasing road competition, and this led the Great Southern Railways to close the Clifden branch in 1935. In the 1970s the state railway authority Córas Iompair Éireann closed the Sligo-Athenry-Ennis line to passenger services. It later closed to freight as well.

In 1936, the original Lough Atalia Bridge was replaced.

On 10 April 1966, the station was named Ceannt Station in commemoration of Éamonn Ceannt, one of the executed leaders of the Easter Rising of 1916.

== Developments ==
In 2007, CIÉ proposed a series of updates to the station as part of a projected new urban quarter development in the area. This proposed development, referred to as the "Ceannt Station Quarter", was projected to cost €1 billion and include the development of offices and a hotel as well as "four rail platforms, 24 bus bays, 500 car spaces, dedicated taxi drop off and collect facilities, and 300 cycle spaces" at the station. This CIÉ project had been "abandoned" by 2012.

In 2013, 1 million euros was reportedly allocated on a "bus/rail/taxi interchange at the station, with widened footpaths, 'properly designed' bus bays, and revised taxi arrangements". In addition, approximately €100,000 was allocated for design work on an "interchange area for bus and rail passengers [..] a seated waiting area, retail units, vending area and a new office for bus inspectors". By 2014, an additional €600,000 was allocated for further work on the interchange area, and a related planning application was submitted to Galway City Council.

In early 2020, it was reported that a planning application, overlapping somewhat with the earlier "Ceannt Station Quarter" proposal, was due to be lodged with the city council. This proposed development, titled "Augustine Hill", would cover an eight-acre site around Ceannt Station "if planning permission is granted". While planning was conditionally approved, in 2021 the developer appealed the removal of several buildings (and the reduction in height of others) from a "scaled-back version" of the Augustine Hill proposal. In mid-2023, while approving permission for much of the project, An Bord Pleanála upheld the decision that "some residential aspects of the design [..] are not suitable and cannot be built".

Work commenced in early 2024 for the €24 million redevelopment of the station, with key features including an increase in platforms from two to five, a new southern entrance and façade, a glass dome roof, customer facilities, retail units and upgraded toilet facilities. The project entered a new phase in April 2026, with the opening of the southern concourse.

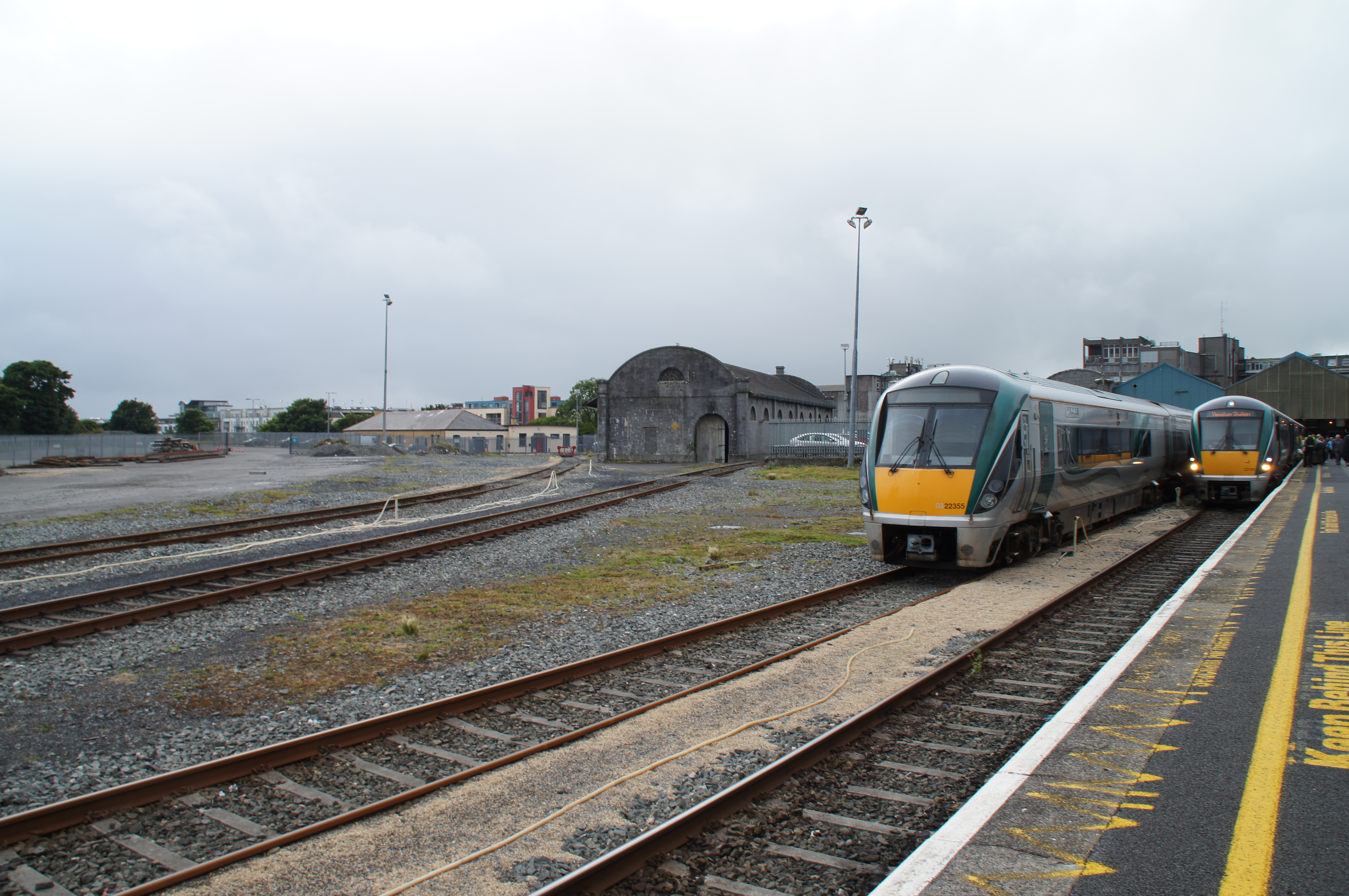
2 ICR sets at Galway Ceannt station.

== See also ==
- List of railway stations in Ireland
- Western Railway Corridor
- The Hardiman Hotel

Preceding station	Iarnród Éireann	Following station
Oranmore	InterCity; Dublin–Westport/Galway railway line	Terminus
Oranmore	InterCity; Western Rail Corridor	Terminus
Oranmore	Commuter; Galway Suburban Rail	Terminus
