= Tuam =

Town in County Galway, Ireland

Tuam Tuaim (Irish)
- Town
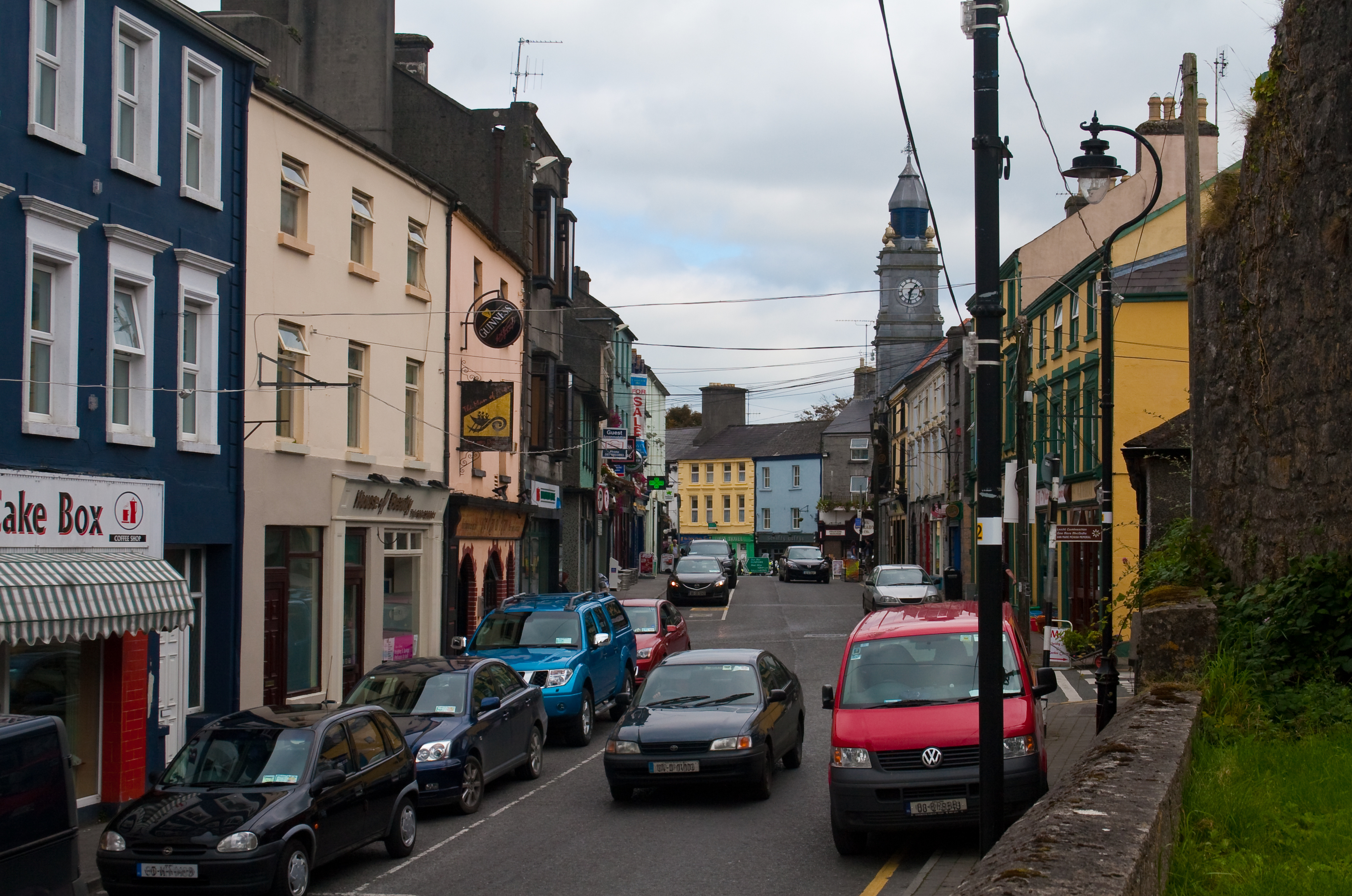
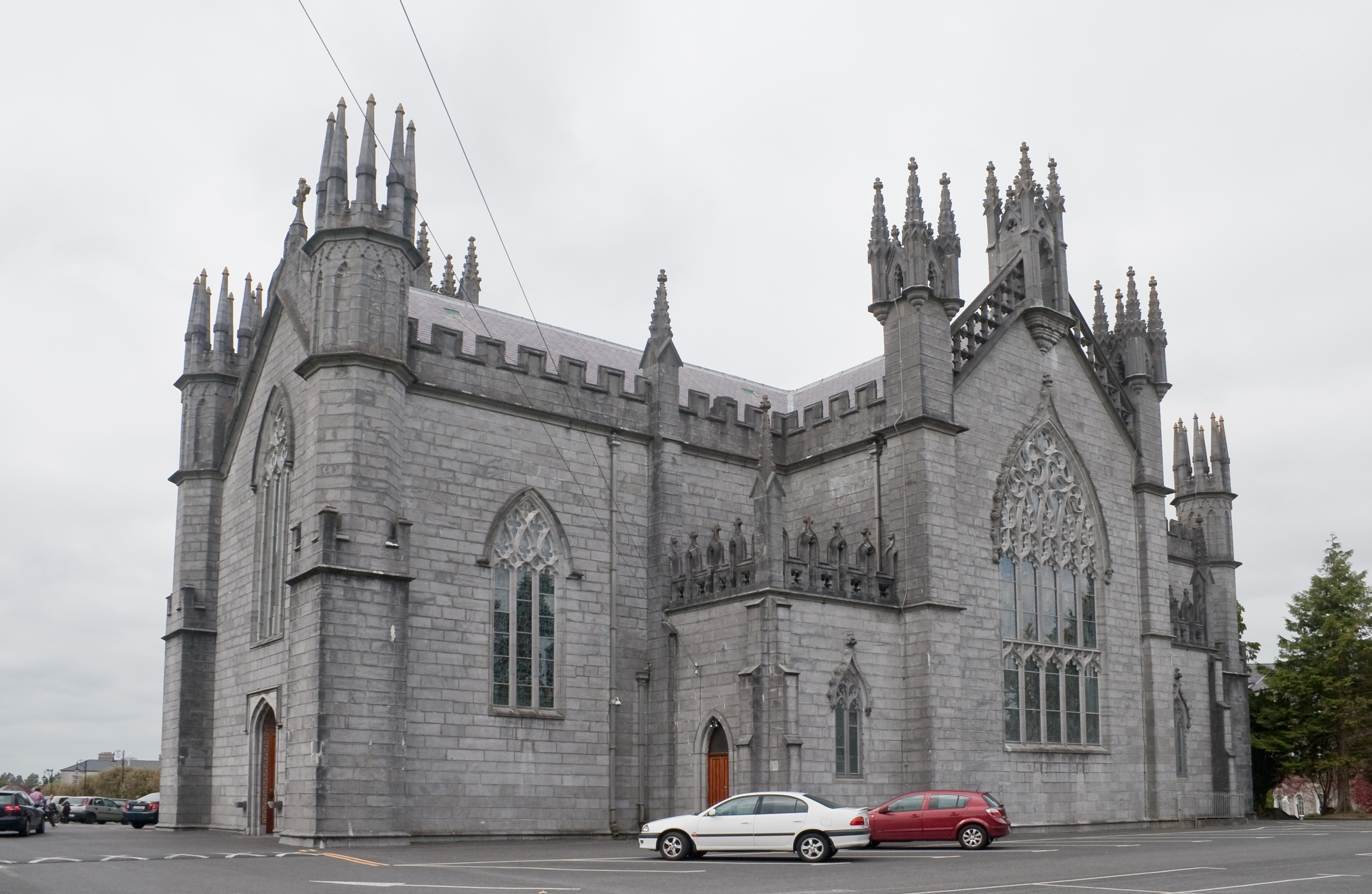
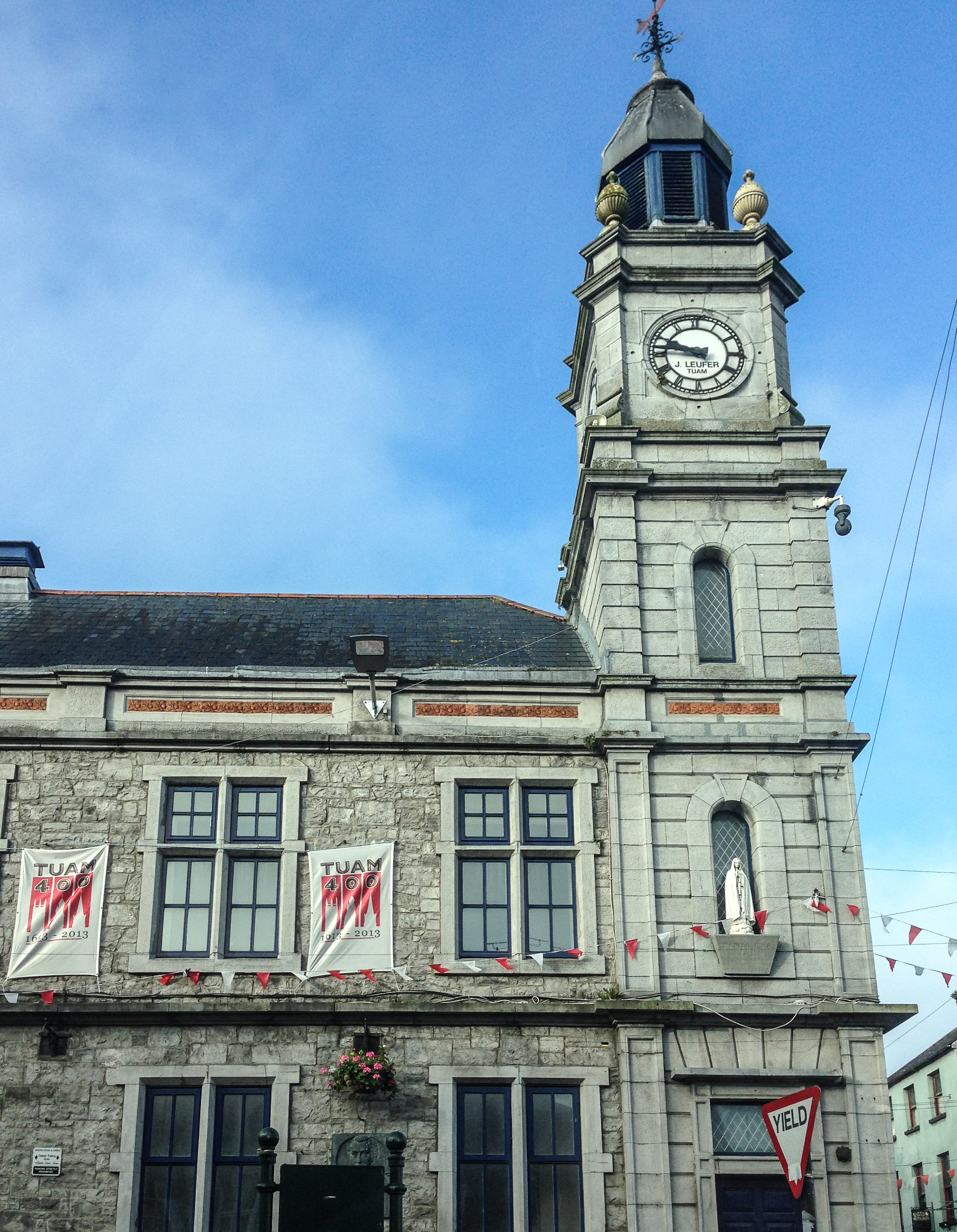
- From the top, Tuam High Street, Cathedral of the Assumption, Tuam Town Hall

- Coat of arms
- Motto: Irish: Tuath Thuama go Buan "Long Live the People of Tuam"
- Location in Ireland
- Coordinates: 53.515°N 8.851°W
- Country: Ireland
- Province: Connacht
- County: County Galway
- Municipal District: Tuam
- Dáil constituency: Galway East

Area
  - Total: 6.5 km^{2} (2.5 sq mi)
- Elevation: 44 m (144 ft)

Population (2022):
  - Total: 9,647
  - Density: 1,500/km^{2} (3,800/sq mi)
- Eircode routing key: H54
- Telephone area code: +353(0)93
- Irish Grid Reference: M436521
- Website: tuam-guide.com

Historical population
Year	Pop.	±%
1821	4,571	—
1831	6,883	+50.6%
1841	6,034	−12.3%
1851	4,929	−18.3%
1861	4,563	−7.4%
1871	4,223	−7.5%
1881	3,567	−15.5%
1891	3,012	−15.6%
1901	2,896	−3.9%
1911	2,980	+2.9%
1926	3,293	+10.5%
1936	4,181	+27.0%
1946	3,868	−7.5%
1951	4,010	+3.7%
1956	4,789	+19.4%
1961	4,732	−1.2%
1966	4,742	+0.2%
1971	4,952	+4.4%
1981	6,093	+23.0%
1986	6,039	−0.9%
1991	5,540	−8.3%
1996	5,627	+1.6%
2002	6,027	+7.1%
2006	6,885	+14.2%
2011	8,242	+19.7%
2016	8,767	+6.4%
2022	9,647	+10.0%

Tuam (/ˈtjuːəm/; Irish: Tuaim [ˈt̪ˠuəmʲ], meaning 'mound' or 'burial-place') is a town in Ireland and the second-largest settlement in County Galway. It is west of the midlands of Ireland, about 35 km (22 mi) north of Galway city. The town is in a civil parish of the same name.

Humans have lived in the area since the Bronze Age while the historic period dates from the sixth century. The town became increasingly important in the 11th and 12th centuries in political and religious aspects of Ireland. The market-based layout of the town and square indicates the importance of commerce.

The red Latin cross of the coat of arms is representative of Tuam's importance as an ecclesiastical centre. The double green flaunches at the sides, represent the two hills or shoulders of Tuam's ancient name, Tuaim Dhá Ghualainn. The two crowns recall the High Kings, Tairrdelbach and Ruaidrí, who were based in Tuam. The broken chariot wheel is a reference to the foundation of the monastic town when St Jarlath's chariot wheel broke. The motto of the town, Tuath Thuama go buan, translates as 'long live the people of Tuam'.

== History ==
The record of human settlement in Tuam dates back to the Bronze Age when an area adjacent to Shop Street was used as a burial ground. The name Tuam is a cognate with the Latin term tumulus ('burial mound'). The town's ancient name was Tuaim Dá Ghualann, i.e. the burial mound of two shoulders. The name probably refers to the high ground on either side of the River Nanny, overlooking a probable fording point over the River Nanny (or Corchra). In 1875, a Bronze Age burial urn was discovered in the area by workmen, dating from c. 1500 BC.

Records date from the early sixth century and mention that a monk called Jarlath was a member of a religious community at Cloonfush some 6 km (4 mi) west of Tuam and adjacent to the religious settlement at Kilbannon. According to the Life of Brendan of Clonfert, Brendan eventually told Jarlath "Not here at all shall be thy resurrection". When Jarlath asked where this may be, Brendan responded: "Have a new chariot made for thou art old; and go thy way in it, and wherever the two hind shafts of the chariot will break, there will be thy resurrection, and that of many others with thee". Jarlath's wheel broke at Tuam (N.B: There is no evidence that the wheel actually broke at Tuam, or even that Saint Jarlath came in a chariot; it is likely that he simply picked the area to establish a monastery as there was already settlement there) and he established a monastery there, known as the School of Tuam. In Ireland, early settlements typically arose through the establishment of a religious site, around which a town subsequently grew. In this way, Tuam grew up around the monastery and has kept the broken chariot wheel as its heraldic symbol.

In 1049, Aedh O'Connor defeated Amalgaid ua Flaithbertaigh, King of Iar Connacht, making the O'Connors provincial kings of Connacht. He then built a castle at Tuam and made it his principal stronghold. This event was directly responsible for the subsequent rise in the importance of the town. Its position dominated the Iar Connacht heartland of Maigh Seóla.

In the 12th century, the town became the centre of Provincial power during the 50-year reign of Tairrdelbach Ua Conchobair (r. 1106–1156). He also brought Tuam its most prominent status as seat of the High King of Ireland which he achieved by force of arms during his long career.

About 1140 Tairrdelbach founded an Augustinian priory in Tuam with possession over three church sites in Ciarraige Airne, east County Mayo. At the Synod of Kells in 1152, the centre of government also became the ecclesiastical centre, as Tuam was elevated to an Archbishopric, with Áed Ua hOissín as the first Archbishop.

Tairrdelbach Ua Conchobair, as High King of Ireland from 1128–1156, was a great patron of the Irish Church and it was due to his patronage that Tuam became the home of some masterpieces of 12th century Celtic art, including the Cross of Cong. Tairrdelbach was succeeded by his son Ruaidrí Ua Conchobair, the last native High King of Ireland. In 1164, Ruaidrí had a "wonderful castle" erected, with a large courtyard defended by lofty and massive walls and a deep moat into which the adjacent river was diverted through. This was the first Irish built stone castle. A small part of the castle still stands. Following the destruction of the first Cathedral in 1184, Ruaidrí Ua Conchobair left Tuam and retired to Cong Abbey, where he entrusted the Church valuables from the Cathedral at Tuam into the care of the abbot. This left Tuam as a small settlement and it wasn't until the early 17th century that it began to grow in importance again.

Throughout history, Tuam has been an important commercial centre with fairs and markets being an important part of commerce in the region. One of its fairs dates to 1252 when letters patent were granted to Archbishop MacFlynn by Henry III of England. Other fairs were authorised by Charters granted by James VI and I and George III.

The Annals of the Four Masters record that in 1488 "A whirlwind attacked a number of persons, as they were cutting turf on the bog of Tuaim-Mona, which killed one of them, and swelled the faces of the rest; and four others were killed by the same wind in Machaire-Chonnacht."

The High Cross of Tuam was brought to Dublin for the Great Exhibition of 1852. However, prior to its return to Tuam, a disagreement arose between the two Churches. Catholic Archbishop Dr John MacHale claimed the Cross rightfully belonged to Catholics, with Dean Charles Seymour of the Church of Ireland asserting a Protestant claim. Agreement was reached with the Cross erected halfway between both Cathedrals and positioned so that it was visible from all main streets of the town. It was in the square in the town centre in 1874.

In July 1920, Tuam Town Hall and other properties were attacked and badly damaged by armed Royal Irish Constabulary men, after two had been killed in an ambush by the Irish Republican Army near the town the day before.

A monumental "Chair of Tuam" was unveiled in May 1980 by the late Cardinal Tomás Ó Fiaich. The 1980s saw the High Cross re-erected in the south transept of St Mary's Cathedral.

=== Mass infant graves scandal ===
The Bon Secours Mother and Baby Home (St Mary's Mother and Baby Home), or simply The Home, was a maternity home for unmarried mothers and their children that operated between 1925 and 1961 in the town. It was run by the Bon Secours religious order of nuns. From its construction in the mid-19th century until the early 20th century, before it was operated by the Bon Secours sisters, the building served as a workhouse for the poor.

Exploratory excavations carried out between November 2016 and February 2017 that had been ordered by the Mother and Baby Homes Commission of Investigation, under Judge Yvonne Murphy, found a "significant" quantity of human remains, aged from 35 foetal weeks to two to three years, interred in a disused former cesspit with twenty chambers. Most of the burials date from the 1950s.

The report on the 2016/2017 excavations said: "The Commission has not yet determined what the purpose of this structure was but it appears to be related to the treatment/containment of sewage and/or waste water. The Commission has also not yet determined if it was ever used for this purpose." Carbon dating confirmed that the remains date from the timeframe relevant to the operation of the Mother and Baby Home by the Bon Secours order. The Commission stated that it was shocked by the discovery and that it is continuing its investigation into who was responsible for the disposal of human remains in this way.

An 18‑strong team of experts commenced a forensic investigation of the site on 14 July 2025, an operation expected to last two years, conducted by the Office of the Director of Authorised Intervention, Tuam (ODAIT). This exhumation is the result of a decade of effort by local people, survivors, campaigners, and journalists since the matter first came to public attention in 2014 through research by local historian Catherine Corless. Approximately 800 dead infants are thought to present.

== Administration ==
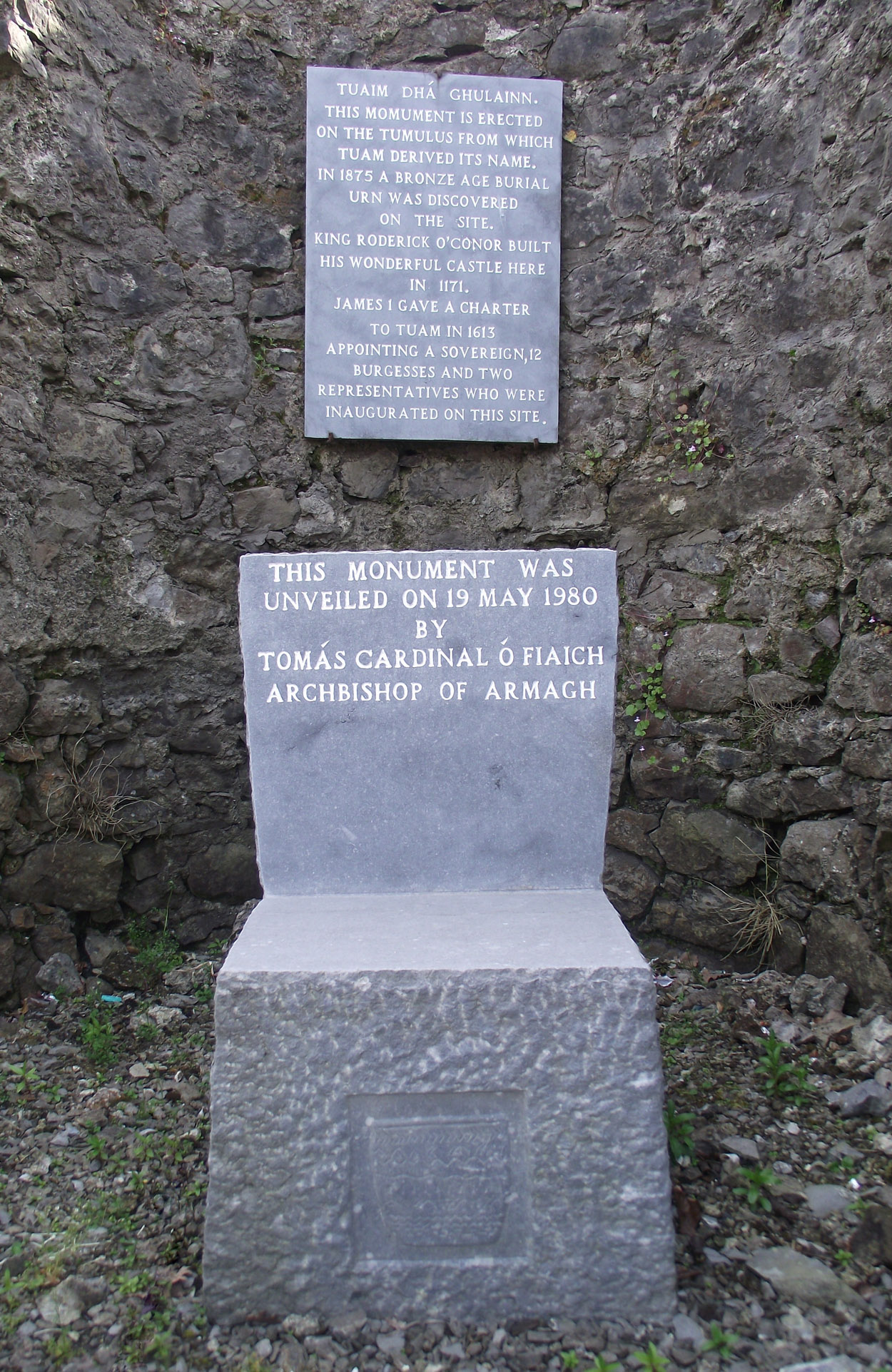
Chair of Tuam Monument

On 30 March 1613, Tuam received a royal charter from James I, which enabled the Tuam constituency to send two representatives to Irish House of Commons until its abolition in 1801. The town was laid out as a market town to its present plan with all the streets converging on the central square. The charter also established a formal local council with an elected sovereign and 12 burgesses. The sovereign was sworn into office at the site of the "Chair of Tuam" which is believed to be within the remaining tower of Ruaidrí Ua Conchobair's castle. The borough was abolished under the Municipal Corporations (Ireland) Act 1840.

The town was later granted town commissioners under the Towns Improvement (Ireland) Act 1854. This body became a town council in 2002, under the Local Government Act 2001. Along with other similar town councils in Ireland, the body was abolished in 2014 under the Local Government Reform Act 2014. The local electoral area of Tuam elects 7 councillors to Galway County Council and forms the Municipal District of Tuam.

== Climate ==
Climate data for Tuam (Airglooney) (1981–2010)
Month	Jan	Feb	Mar	Apr	May	Jun	Jul	Aug	Sep	Oct	Nov	Dec	Year
Mean daily maximum °C (°F)	8.7 (47.7)	9.0 (48.2)	10.7 (51.3)	13.0 (55.4)	15.7 (60.3)	18.3 (64.9)	19.4 (66.9)	19.3 (66.7)	17.3 (63.1)	14.1 (57.4)	11.4 (52.5)	8.9 (48.0)	13.8 (56.9)
Daily mean °C (°F)	5.2 (41.4)	5.5 (41.9)	6.9 (44.4)	8.4 (47.1)	10.9 (51.6)	13.4 (56.1)	15.1 (59.2)	14.9 (58.8)	12.9 (55.2)	10.1 (50.2)	7.8 (46.0)	5.5 (41.9)	9.7 (49.5)
Mean daily minimum °C (°F)	1.7 (35.1)	2.0 (35.6)	3.1 (37.6)	3.9 (39.0)	6.1 (43.0)	8.5 (47.3)	10.8 (51.4)	10.6 (51.1)	8.6 (47.5)	6.0 (42.8)	4.2 (39.6)	2.0 (35.6)	5.6 (42.1)
Mean monthly sunshine hours	42.70	61.82	93.31	142.80	169.26	144.00	126.79	124.93	104.70	86.18	52.80	33.79	1,183.08
Source: Met Éireann

== Transport ==
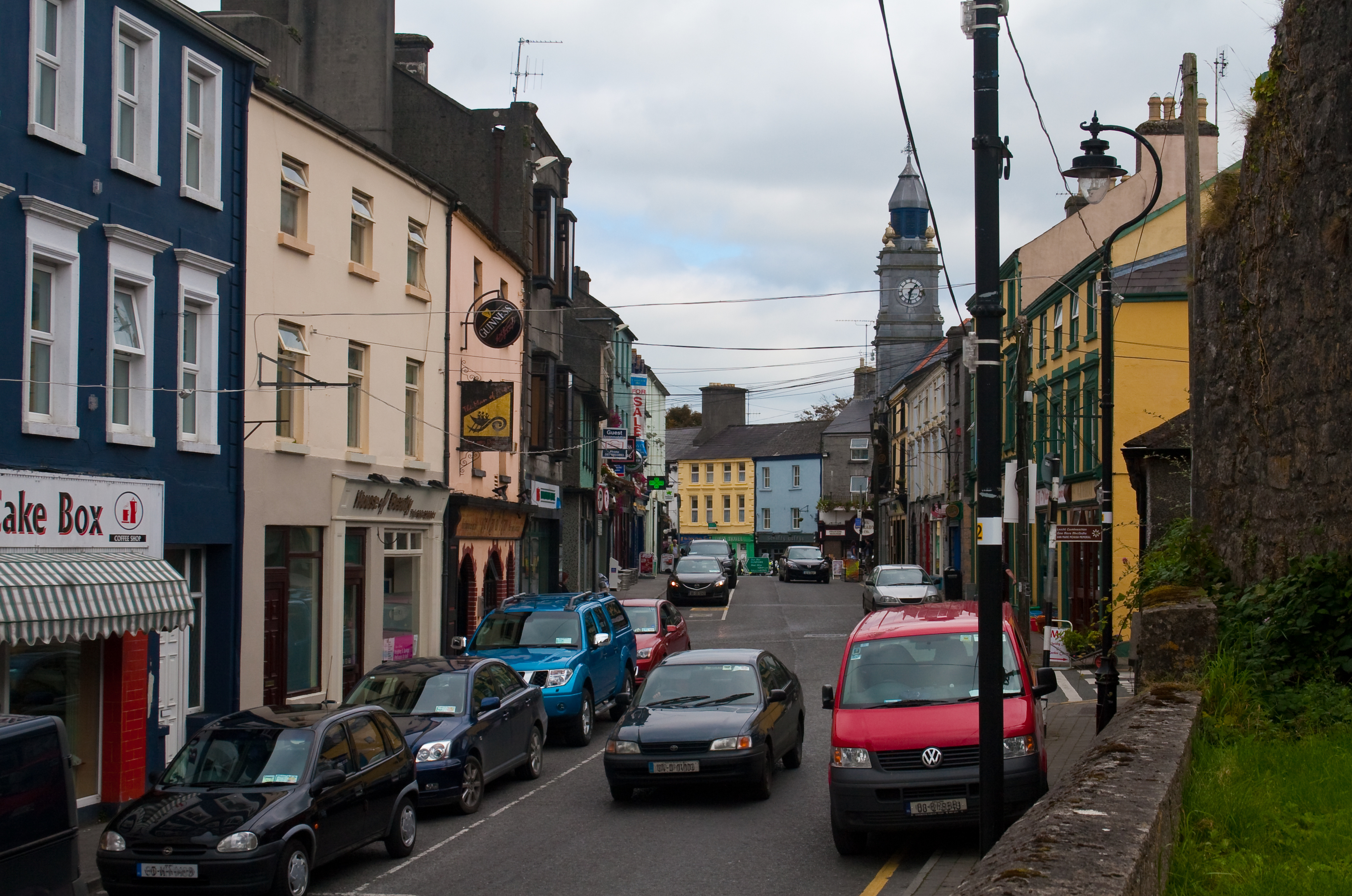
The High Street in Tuam is the west-most section of the N83.

Tuam is served by the N17 road (to Collooney) and the N83 road (Galway to Sinolane Cross) as well as the R332 and R347. A bypass of the N17, avoiding congestion to the west of the town, involved acquisition of land by Galway County Council in late 2006. The design of this road includes a bridge over the existing closed railway lines, allowing for future re-opening of the line. The M17 was opened ahead of schedule on 27 September 2017.

Tuam railway station (which is disused; the building still stands but has fallen into severe disrepair) is located on the disused railway line from Athenry to Sligo. There was a part-successful campaign by West-on-track to have the line reopened as a Western Railway Corridor which was recognised in the Transport21 project. Construction work to reopen the line between Ennis and Athenry was completed in 2009. Passengers trains run between Limerick and Athenry (where connections to Galway can be made) with further extensions planned. Tuam railway station opened on 27 September 1860, closed to passenger traffic on 5 April 1976 and finally closed altogether on 18 December 1978. The railway lines were heavily used by trains transporting sugar beets to the Irish Sugar Factory (Comhlucht Siúcra Éireann Teo.) formerly located off the Ballygaddy Road. The railway line was used during the filming of The Quiet Man, and can be seen when John Wayne disembarks at Ballyglunin, around 6 km (4 mi) from Tuam.

Tuam is served by multiple Bus Éireann routes.

== Education ==
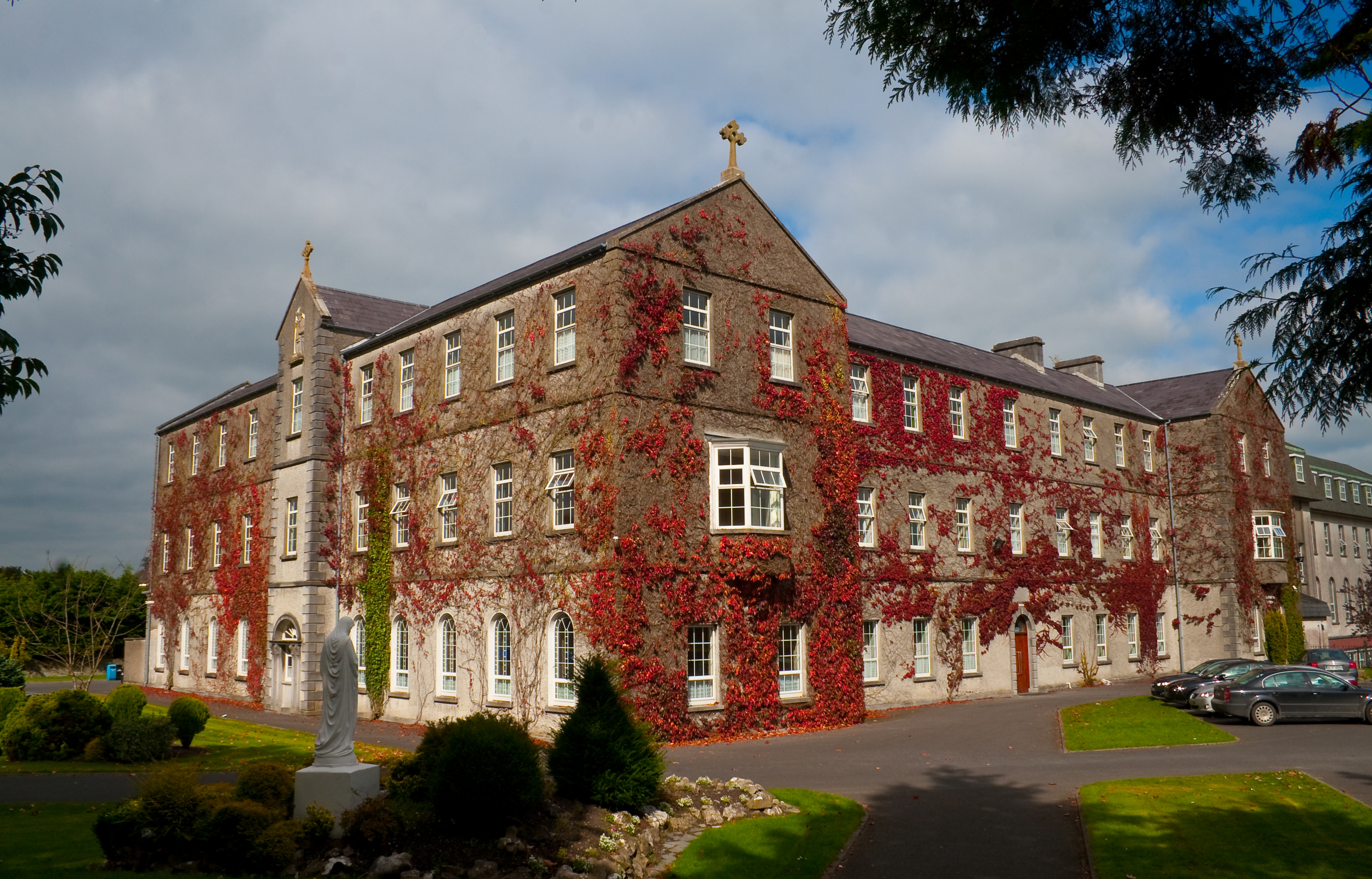
St Jarlath's College, founded in 1800

Tuam is the location of several second-level educational institutions, St Jarlath's College, Archbishop McHale College, Presentation College Currylea, and St Bridget's Secondary School. In September 2023 both Presentation College and St. Bridget's amalgamated into High Cross College. St Patrick's College (formerly Tuam Christian Brothers School), was amalgamated with St Jarlath's College in June 2009. There are five main primary schools: the Mercy Convent and the Presentation Convent, St Patrick's Primary School, the Educate Together National School and Gaelscoil Iarfhlatha, an Irish language primary school (bunscoil lán Ghaeilge).

== Economy ==
Tuam is home to several large employers, the largest of which is Valeo Vision Systems, which currently employs over 1,000 people.

== Religion ==
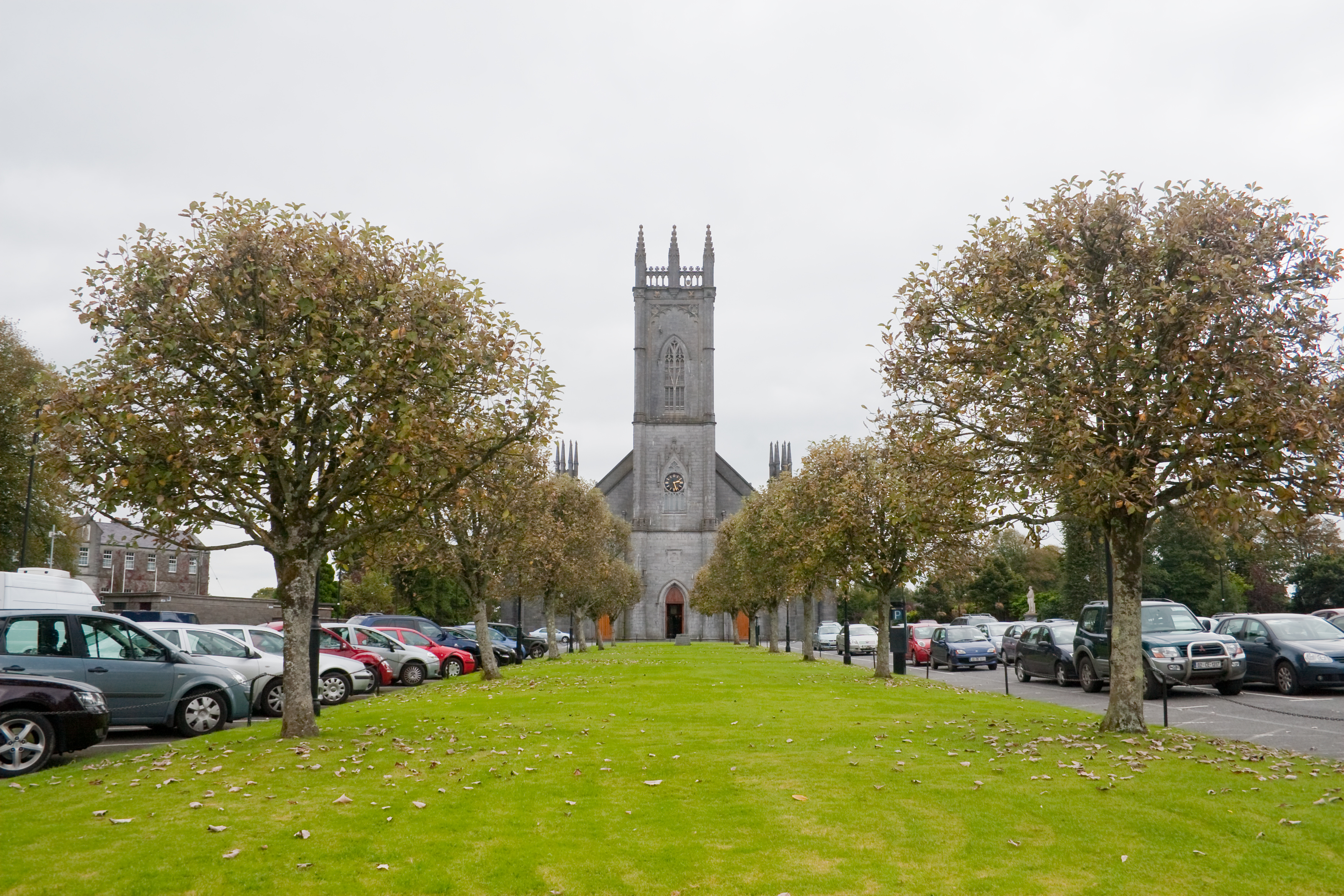
Cathedral of the Assumption, built in 1827–1837

Tuam has two cathedrals, Cathedral of the Assumption of the Blessed Virgin Mary, Tuam, which is the seat of the Roman Catholic Archdiocese of Tuam, and the Church of Ireland's St Mary's Cathedral. The town's patron saint is Saint Jarlath. The ancient monastic site of Kilbannon, founded by Benignus of Armagh in the fifth century, lies 3.7 km (2.3 mi) to the northwest of Tuam.

== Sport ==
=== Gaelic games ===
Tuam Stars, founded in 1888, is the local Gaelic football team, and are one of Galway's most successful clubs. From 1953 to 1960, Tuam Stars were a dominant force in the Galway County Championship winning seven titles in a row, with players such as Seán Purcell and Frank Stockwell playing at the time. St Jarlath's College, Tuam has won the Hogan Cup (national championship for secondary schools) a record 12 times since the competition began in 1946. The parish has a second Gaelic football club, Cortoon Shamrocks, founded in 1888.

Tuam Stadium St Jarlath's Park was officially opened on 21 May 1950 by the Archbishop of Tuam, Rev. Dr. Walsh. It became "the home of Galway football" and has hosted many important matches including Connacht Senior Football Finals. A €5 million redevelopment project has been granted planning permission including a new 6,400 capacity stand and ancillary facilities. Tuam Stadium Development Committee is currently fundraising for this project.

=== Soccer ===
There are also two soccer clubs in Tuam. Tuam Celtic A.F.C., founded in 1974, play their home matches at Celtic Park, Cloonthue. Dynamo Blues, founded in 1978, whose temporary home was the College Field Athenry Road, are now back in their original home, Dynamo Blues pitch behind Parkmore Estate.

=== Rugby ===
Tuam Rugby Football Club is a rugby union club based on the outskirts of Tuam in Garraun Park. The club fields two adult junior-standard teams in J1A and J1C, senior women's teams, and different youth age groups, both boys and girls. While football was primarily the first choice sport for many, the rugby club has grown annually since its foundation in 1969.

=== Golf ===
Tuam Golf Club was established on 17 October 1904 with the original clubhouse at Cloonascragh on the Athenry Road. The club relocated to Mayfield, on the Dunmore Road in 1937 due to a deterioration of the Cloonascragh course. In March 1940 a new club called the Commercial Golf Club was established, which renovated the course and remained for many years at Cloonascragh. World-renowned Irish golfer Christy O'Connor Snr joined Tuam Golf Club as club professional in 1948.

To develop an 18-hole course, Tuam Golf Club relocated to Barnacurragh (close to the original Cloonascragh course) and a new clubhouse. The first nine holes were opened in 1975. 18 holes came into play by 1979, on the course designed by golf architect, Eddie Hackett. Improvement works have continued over the years with Christy O'Connor Jnr advising the club on course improvement works. The most recent design work has been under the guidance of golf architect Ken Kearney.

=== Athletics ===
Tuam Athletics Club is a club which, in addition to its many juvenile training sessions, holds training sessions and meets for adults.

In June 2020, Tuam hosted the Rob Heffernan Academy Grand Final. This event, involving 40 youngsters who race walked in 1 km competitions, was the culmination of a virtual challenge in which young athletes were invited to race walk 100 metres in under 30 seconds and submit videos to 2013 world 50 km race walking champion and 2012 Olympic bronze medalist Heffernan. Of the 197 entrants, Heffernan initially selected the best ten to be part of the academy, which was subsequently expanded to over 50 athletes who received online coaching from the man himself and former international team-mate / Tuam resident, Pierce O'Callaghan

=== Gymnastics ===
Tuam All Star Gymnastics Club runs classes from its Athenry Road base. In 2010 the club reached the semi-finals of the All Ireland Talent Show.

=== Swimming ===
Tuam Swimming Club has been promoting swimming in the Tuam area since its foundation in 1950. The club season runs from September to the end of June each year.

== Culture ==
=== Arts ===
The Marian Choral Society was formed in 1974, with an initial aim to sing church and secular music. Then, in 1977, the first musical production was staged, with an annual show each October since.

Earwig! Tuam Community Arts Group was formed in October 2003 to provide Tuam and its surroundings with an outlet for its creative talent. Since 2003, the group has organised an arts festival which includes visual arts, theatre, drama, spectacle, children's arts workshops, street performance and music. Earwig! also takes part in the annual St Patrick's Day parade in Tuam with an emphasis on bringing movement and spectacle.

=== Music ===
While The Saw Doctors are perhaps the town's most famous band, in the 1960s, Tuam was known as 'The Showband Capital of Ireland'. At the time, a number of showbands called the market town home, including the Johnny Flynn Showband. In 2009, a compilation CD of over 50 original songs, all by musicians from Tuam, entitled Songs from the Broken Wheel, was released. Tuam is referenced in song "The Rocky Road to Dublin", popularised by The Dubliners and various other Irish folk artists. The song details a man's experiences as he travels to Liverpool, England from his home in Tuam.

=== Old Tuam Society ===
The Old Tuam Society was founded in 1942 with a view to preserving a record of the town's past and to foster and promote that knowledge for the benefit of future generations. The new society was open to "all those who are interested in its aims, namely the preservation and study of the antiquities of Tuam and district." An invitation was issued to Tuam people scattered far and wide to join the circle for an annual subscription of two shillings and six pence. The Society publishes an annual called JOTS (Journal of the Old Tuam Society).

=== Market day ===
The Tuam market was revived in 2006 by the Energise Tuam, a group which organised by local traders in conjunction with Tuam Chamber of Commerce in an effort to promote shopping in the town. It currently takes place on the last Saturday of every month, at the plaza in front of Tuam Shopping Centre. In the future, Galway County Council has earmarked the Shambles car park nearer the town centre as the market's location on a permanent basis.

=== Media ===
The Tuam Herald is a weekly local newspaper, founded in 1837 by Richard Kelly, which serves the town of Tuam and the surrounding areas of north County Galway, south Mayo and west Roscommon. It is County Galway's oldest newspaper and the fifth oldest newspaper in the Republic of Ireland.

=== Public library ===
Tuam Library services the area of Tuam. It is a public library operated by Galway County Council. The library offer a wide range of fiction and non-fiction titles, including children's books, fiction, and reference among other, more niche, categories. It offers some resources unique to it, such as local history records of the town and surrounding areas. A microfilm facility offers records of local newspapers and historic Census records. The library is part of the Libraries Ireland network, meaning that if a book is not in their own catalogue, it can be ordered from any other library within the Republic of Ireland.

This can be done in person at the library, or online using the Spydus 10 system, operated by Civica, on the Galway Libraries website. Other resources are available at the library, including the use of desktop computers and tablets, public WiFi and printing. All services necessitate a library membership, which is free for all. All services are free, excepting the printing service, which charges a small fee to cover the cost of ink cartridges and paper.

== International relations ==
=== Twin towns ===
Tuam is twinned with Straubing in Germany.

== Places of interest ==
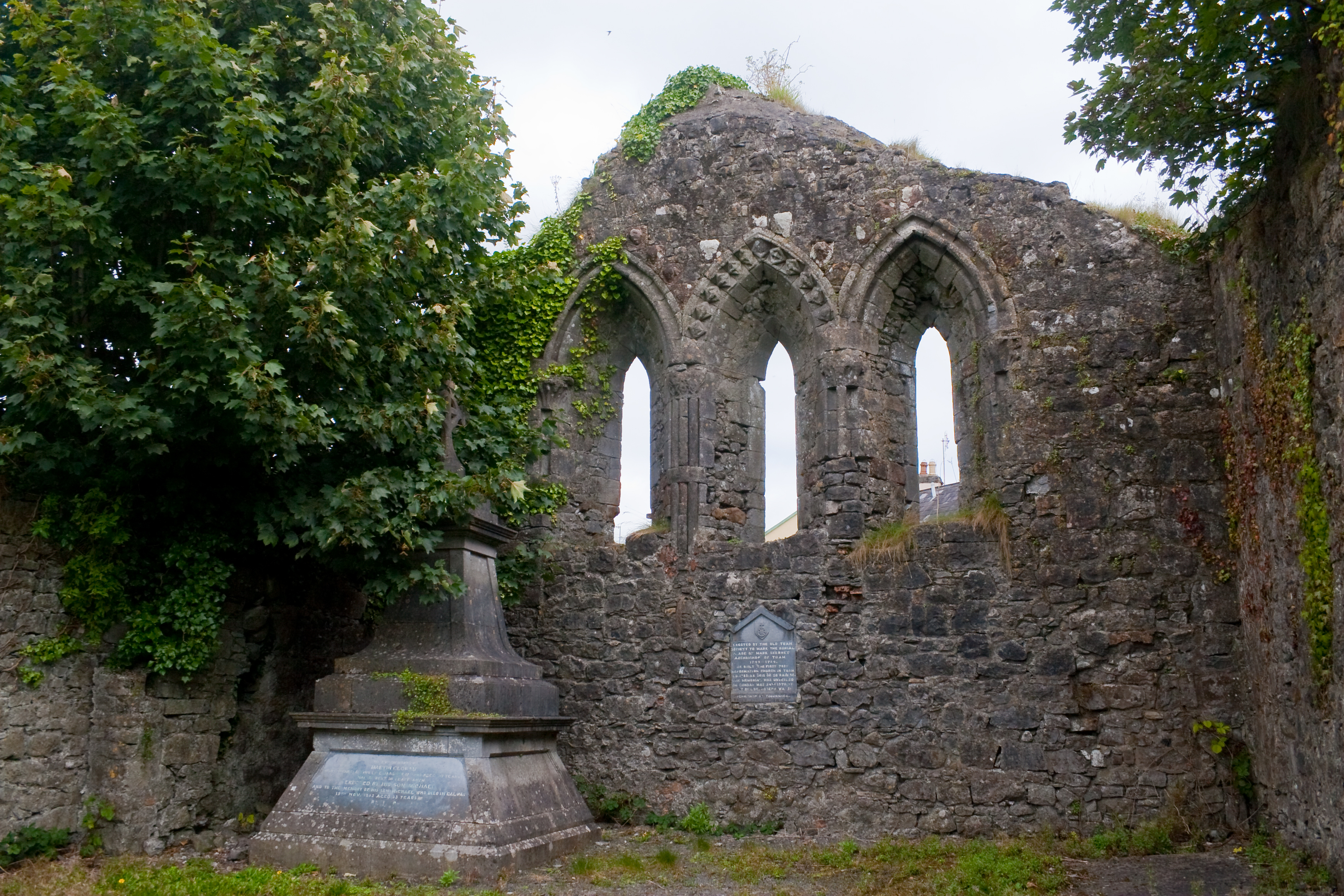
13th-century east window of Temple Jarlath

- Temple Jarlath at High Street, marks the site of the earliest monastic settlement in Tuam, established by St Jarlath circa 526–527 AD. Temple Jarlath is near the town centre. It marks the site of an early monastic settlement dedicated to St Jarlath, Tuam's sixth century patron. The surviving ruins include a late 13th-century parish church containing an east window in Transitional style.
- The Mill Museum – This undershot water wheel mill found off Shop Street, which traces its origin to the 17th century, was in operation until 1964. It is the only preserved corn mill in the West of Ireland. The Mill Museum complex, located beside the river Nanny, consists of the restored corn mill with operating water wheel, an audiovisual museum and Tourist Information Office.
- Cathedral of the Assumption – Roman Catholic Archdiocese of Tuam in County Galway.

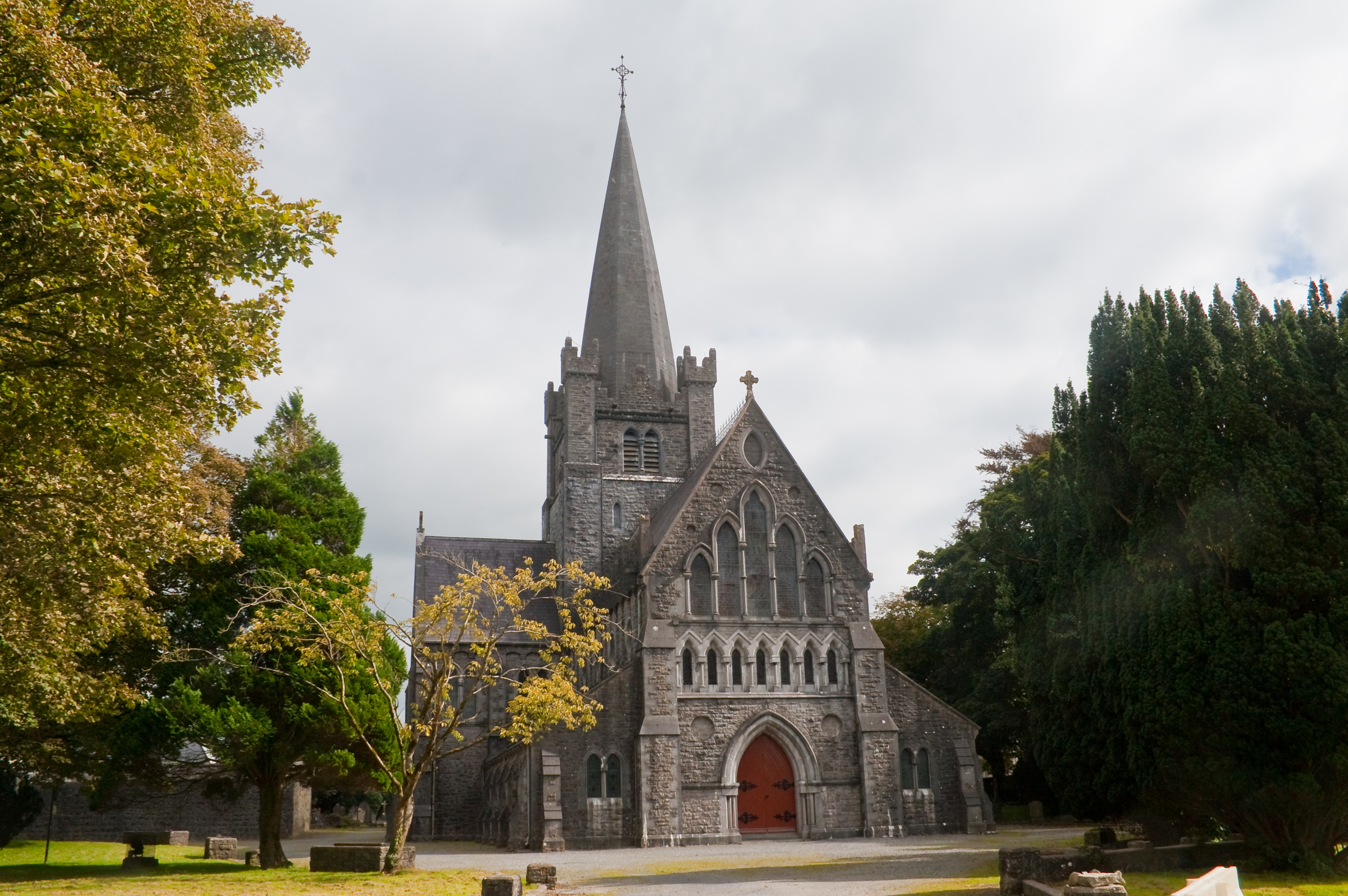
St Mary's Cathedral

- St Mary's Cathedral – The Church of Ireland Cathedral was built 1861–1878, incorporating a 12th-century arch and sanctuary, and a 14th-century chancel.
- Castlehacket – a 13th-century tower house near Tuam, was home of the Hacket family at first; later of the Kirwans after the Cromwellian settlement. Many scenes from the 1969 film Alfred the Great were filmed in the environs of Castlehacket and Knockma.
- Feartagar Castle, a Burke castle located 8 km (5 miles) northwest of Tuam.

=== High crosses of Tuam ===
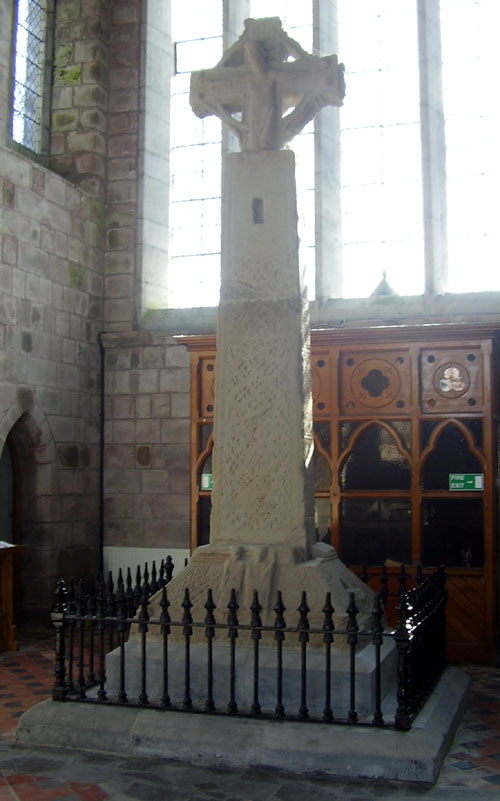
High Cross of Tuam

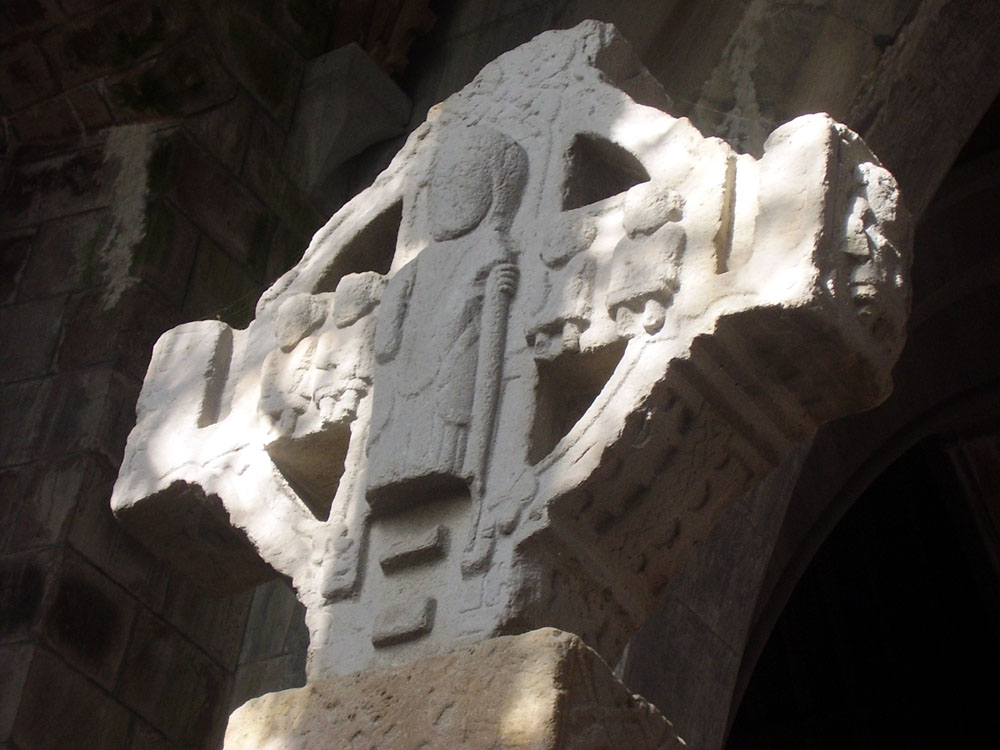
Headpiece of the High Cross of Tuam

The High Cross of Tuam was erected in 1152 possibly to commemorate the appointment of the first Archbishop of Tuam, Archbishop Áed Ua hOissín. An inscription at the base calls for "A prayer for O'hOisín; for the Abbot; by whom it was made". It is reputed to have been the tallest of the High Crosses of Ireland, but its artistry is scarred by the absence of the top portion of the main shaft. The sandstone Cross was originally erected in proximity to the earliest Cathedral erected in the town, a part of which still remains and is incorporated into St Mary's Cathedral (12th-century red sandstone chancel arch in Irish Romanesque architecture, which is a National monument). The original High Cross or Market cross may have been erected close to what is now the Market Square and High Street.

When the first Cathedral collapsed after being destroyed by fire in 1184, the High Cross was dismantled into pieces, each under different ownership. The archaeologist George Petrie discovered the base of the High Cross around 1820 and later discovered two other pieces in other locations. The High Cross contains a portion from another High Cross, the ringed cross-section on top. In addition to the Market Cross, it is likely that there were at least four other carved stone crosses from the Connor's reign in the town. An area close to the town square, known as the Shambles, which continued to function as a market place until recently, was at one point the location of the Market Cross until 1721.

The Cross was brought to Dublin for the Great Exhibition of 1852. However, prior to its return to Tuam, a disagreement arose between the two Churches. Catholic Archbishop Dr John MacHale claimed the Cross rightfully belonged to Catholics, with Dean Charles Seymour of the Church of Ireland asserting a Protestant claim. Agreement was reached with the Cross erected halfway between both Cathedrals and positioned so that it was visible from all main streets of the town. It was in the square in the town centre in 1874.

By the late 1980s, it was evident that the decorative stone carving of the Cross was deteriorating due to weathering and pollution. Experts thought that there was a danger from traffic passing nearby. After lengthy discussions, the Office of Public Works removed the monument from the square in April 1992. Following cleaning and minor restoration, the High Cross was re-erected in the south transept of St Mary's Cathedral, where it now is, near its original location. St Mary's Cathedral also houses the shaft of a third Cross fashioned from limestone. It is thought that all of the High Crosses would have marked the boundaries of the monastic section of Tuam.

== Notable people ==
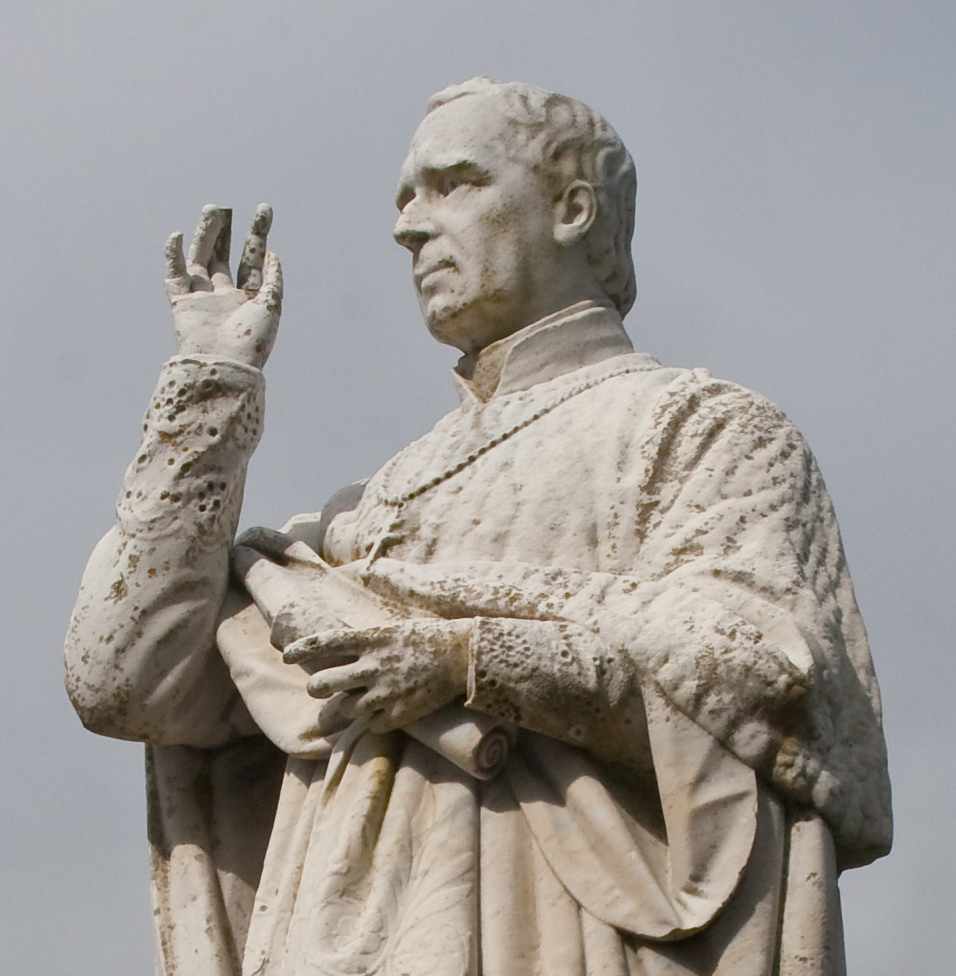
Statue of John MacHale at the Cathedral of the Assumption

- Amergin of Maigh Seóla (fl. c. 550) – father of Saint Finbar
- Blaze X – punk band
- Augustus Nicholas Burke (1838–1891) – artist
- Robert Malachy Burke (1907–1998) – Christian Socialist, better known as Bobby Burke
- Sir Theobald Burke, 13th Baronet (1833–1909) – Baronet and soldier
- Thomas Henry Burke (1829–1882) – Permanent Under Secretary at the Irish Office; killed during the Phoenix Park Murders
- Edward "Doc" Byrne (fl. 1880–1884) – author and editor of The Freeman's Journal newspaper
- Seán Canney (born 1960) – Independent politician and a Teachta Dála (TD) for the Galway East
- Tairrdelbach Ua Conchobair (1088–1156) – King of Ireland
- Mike Cooley (1934–2020) – Trade union activist
- Catherine Corless (born 1954) – Local historian, Mother and Baby home activist
- Paul Cunniffe (1961–2001) – Singer-songwriter, musician
- Bernard Davenport (1939–2018) – Retired Ambassador to Argentina, also the Holy See
- Raymond Deane (born 1953) – modernist classical composer
- Richard W. "Dick" Dowling – Fought in the U.S. Civil War for the Confederacy
- Andrew Egan (c.1810–1863) – Architect and "Builder of Tuam"
- Jarlath Fallon (born 1973) – Gaelic footballer
- Rúaidhri Ua Flaithbheartaigh (c. 1020–1061) – King of Iar Connacht
- James Ellis Fleming (fl. 1824–1832) – claimant to the title of 20th Baron Slane
- John Fury – Boxer and father of Tyson Fury
- Áed Ua hOissín (Hugh O'Hession) – first Archbishop of Tuam
- Colm Keaveney (born 1971) – Politician
- Colonel Patrick Kelly – American Civil War Commander
- Mark Killilea Jnr – Fianna Fáil politician
- Mark Killilea Snr – Fianna Fáil politician
- Sir Gerard Lally – Irish Jacobite and French military officer
- John MacHale – Archbishop of Tuam
- Peter Maher – Heavyweight champion boxer
- Jack Mangan – Gaelic footballer
- Finian McGrath – Independent politician
- Paddy McHugh – Independent politician
- Stephen Moore – Australian International rugby player
- Leo Moran - (born 1964) Musician, lead guitarist of The Saw Doctors
- Michael Moran – Republican
- Myles Moylan (c.1837–1909) – United States Army officer
- Tom Murphy – Playwright
- Brendan Murray – Member of band HomeTown and Irish 2017 Eurovision entrant
- Seán Ó Maolalaidh – Chief of the Name (Lally)
- Tomás Ó Maolalaidh – Bishop of Clonmacnoise and Archbishop of Tuam
- Joseph O'Neill – Novelist, playwright and Secretary of the Department of Education
- Mughron Ua Níoc – (d.1032) Abbot of Tuam
- Seán Purcell – Gaelic footballer
- Frances P. Ruane – Former director of the Economic and Social Research Institute (ESRI)
- Mark F. Ryan – Author and nationalist
- Rossa Ryan – Flat horseracing jockey
- The Saw Doctors – band
- So Cow – Irish band
- Frank Stockwell – Gaelic footballer
- Brian Talty – Gaelic footballer

== Places named after Tuam ==
- Tuam Street, Christchurch, New Zealand is named after the Irish (Anglican) bishopric of Tuam. It was named by Captain Joseph Thomas, the Canterbury Association's Chief Surveyor and his assistant Edward Jollie.
- Tuam Street, in Houston, Texas, US, is named in honour of Richard W. "Dick" Dowling, who was born in Tuam.
- Tuam Road is located in Plumstead, in the Borough of Greenwich in London, SE18.

== See also ==
- Diocese of Tuam, Killala and Achonry
- List of towns and villages in Ireland
