= Adrian Hardiman =

Irish supreme court judge (1951–2016)

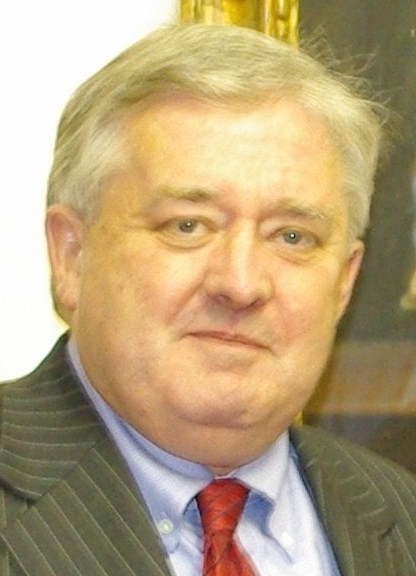

Judge of the Supreme Court
- In office 7 February 2000 – 7 March 2016
- Nominated by: Government of Ireland
- Appointed by: Mary McAleese

Personal details
- Born: 21 May 1951 Coolock, Dublin, Ireland
- Died: 7 March 2016 (aged 64) Portobello, Dublin, Ireland
- Spouse: Yvonne Murphy (m. 1981)
- Children: 3
- Education: University College Dublin; King's Inns

Adrian Hardiman (21 May 1951 – 7 March 2016) was an Irish judge who served as a Judge of the Supreme Court from 2000 to 2016.

== Early life and education ==
Adrian Hardiman was born on 21 May 1951, in Coolock, Dublin. His father was a teacher and president of the Association of Secondary Teachers, Ireland (ASTI).

He was educated at Belvedere College, Dublin, and University College Dublin, where he studied history, and the King's Inns. He was president of the Student Representative Council at UCD and Auditor of the Literary and Historical Society (UCD) and won The Irish Times National Debating Championship in 1973.

== Family ==
Hardiman was married to Judge Yvonne Murphy, from County Donegal, a judge of the Circuit Court between 1998 and 2012, who conducted important inquiries relating to sex abuse including the Murphy Report and the Cloyne Report. She has been chair of the Commission of Investigation into Mother and Baby homes.

Justice Hardiman and Judge Murphy had three sons, one of whom, Eoin, is a barrister and has been a member of the Mountjoy Prison Visiting Committee; Hugh, who was a personal assistant to Michael McDowell, when McDowell was Minister for Justice, Equality and Law Reform; and Daniel, a Doctor.

== Political career ==
While involved with Fine Gael, he subsequently joined Fianna Fáil while a student in University College Dublin, and stood (unsuccessfully) for Fianna Fáil in the local elections in Dún Laoghaire in 1985. In 1985, he became a founder member of the Progressive Democrats, but left the party when he was appointed to the Supreme Court. He remained very friendly with the former party leader and ex-Tánaiste, Michael McDowell, who was a close friend at college, a fellow founding member of the party, and best man at his wedding.

== Legal career ==
Hardiman was called to the Irish Bar in 1974, where he had a successful practice as a barrister, focusing on criminal law and defamation. In 2000, he received the rare honour of being appointed directly from the Bar to the Supreme Court, Ireland's highest court.

In a tribute following his death in 2016, President Michael D. Higgins said Justice Hardiman "was one of the great legal minds of his generation", who was "always committed to the ideals of public service". He was described as a "colossus of the legal world" by Chief Justice Susan Denham.

Politically, Hardiman supported the liberal side in Ireland's debates over abortion, being active in the "anti-amendment" campaign during the 1983 Abortion Referendum and later represented the Well Woman Centre in the early 1990s. After his death, he was described by Joan Burton as a liberal on social issues. But he could be an outspoken opponent of political correctness and a supporter of judicial restraint, such as when he rejected the Equality Authority's attempt to force Portmarnock Golf Club to accept women as full members. He also believed that certain decisions, such as those involving public spending, were better left to elected politicians rather than unelected judges, regardless of how unpopular that might sometimes be in the media (which he tended to hold in low esteem) and among what he described as the "chattering classes".

One commentator wrote that "Hardiman’s greatest contribution ...was the steadfast defence of civil liberties and individual rights" and that "He was a champion of defendants' rights and a bulwark against any attempt by the Garda Síochána to abuse its powers". His concern for individual rights was not confined to Ireland: in February 2016, he criticized what he described as the radical undermining of the presumption of innocence, especially in sex cases, by the methods used in the UK's Operation Yewtree inquiry into historical sex allegations against celebrities, and he also criticized "experienced lawyer" and then US presidential candidate Hillary Clinton for allegedly declaring in January that "every accuser was to be believed, only to amend her view when asked if it applied to women who had made allegations against her husband", former US President Bill Clinton.

== Key judgments ==
Hardiman wrote a number of important judgments since joining the Court. He also presided (as does each Supreme Court judge on a rotating basis) over the Court of Criminal Appeal. The following is a selection of judgments delivered by Justice Hardiman, in reverse chronological order:

2007

- O'Callaghan -v- Judge Mahon: dissent; holding that Tribunal of Inquiry should be prevented from further inquiring into the applicants; cites R -v- Lynch (1829) – the Doneraile Conspiracy case – in which by skilful cross-examination Daniel O'Connell secured acquittals on capital charges; concluded that the contrary approach "would represent a very marked coarsening of our standards of procedural fairness."
- Shortt -v- The Commissioner of An Garda Síochána: one of two judgments, in which the Court more than doubled (€1.9m to €4.7m) the damages granted to a man wrongfully imprisoned for over two years after two members of the Garda Síochána concocted evidence against him
- P.H. -v- D.P.P.

2006

- D.P.P. -v- Anthony Barnes: discusses and restates the criminal law of self-defence in the case of burglary
- McK. -v- Homan
- N -v- Health Service Executive: one of five judgments given by the Court; this case concerned the circumstances in which a parent may exercise the right provided for in Irish law to rescind initial consent to adoption.
- A. -v- The Governor of Arbour Hill Prison: one of five judgments; the case concerned a "collateral" challenge by a prisoner to the lawfulness of his detention following the judgment in C.C. -v- Ireland (see immediately below).
- C.C. -v- Ireland: striking down as unconstitutional part of the law on statutory rape, due to the absence in any circumstances of a defence of honest mistake as to age.

2005

- O'Callaghan -v- The Hon. Mr. Justice Mahon

2003

- Gough -v- Neary
- Lobe -v- Minister for Justice, Equality and Law Reform: one of seven judgments in a case concerning whether the State could deport the parents of Irish citizens who were still minors; the Court by a majority (5–2) dismissed the appeal and allowed the deportation of the family.

2002

- Dunne -v- D.P.P.: one of a series of cases, beginning with Braddish v D.P.P., in which the Court considered the contours of the Garda Síochána's duty to seek out and preserve evidence relevant to a criminal trial.
- Ardagh -v-. Maguire: this case concerned the procedures to be applied by a parliamentary inquiry into an incident in which members of the Garda Síochána shot dead a civilian, John Carthy.

2001

- DPP -v-. Davis: on causation, and the relationship which must be shown between the injuries caused by the defendant and the death of the victim.

== Death ==
Hardiman died on 7 March 2016 at the age of 64. The eulogy at his funeral, which took place in the Church of the Holy Name in Ranelagh, was delivered by Michael McDowell. He said: "The fates have robbed us of someone who simultaneously excelled in his many different personae as husband, father, grandfather, an original thinker, an advocate and, for so many who are here, simply that of a loyal friend."

President Michael D Higgins and his wife Sabina, US Ambassador Kevin O'Malley and Chief Justice Ms Justice Susan Denham all paid their respects. Ex-TDs Lucinda Creighton, Mary Harney, Des O'Malley and Pat Rabbitte were also among those who signed a book of condolence, with Taoiseach Enda Kenny represented by his aide-de-camp.

Upon his death, his colleague Justices of the Supreme Court released an extensive statement acknowledging Hardiman's contributions to the court system and to the country.

== Bibliography ==
- Hardiman, Adrian (2017). Joyce in Court. London: Head of Zeus. ISBN 9781786691583.

== See also ==
- Auditors of the Literary and Historical Society (University College Dublin)
