= Andrew Egan =

Irish architect and builder

Andrew Egan (c.1810 – 9 October 1863) was an Irish architect and builder.

Egan was a member of a noted County Galway family, Mac Aodhagáin. He is thought to have been born on Tuam's Old Road or at Cloonsheen. His father was a stonemason and he had siblings Patrick, Thomas, Bridget and Elizabeth. He began his apprenticeship in 1826, the same year as the foundation stone of Tuam's new Catholic Cathedral. By the late 1830s, Egan had progressed far enough to be entrusted with a supervisory role in the erection of the Bell Tower of the cathedral.

In 1838, the local Roman Catholic Free School was constructed, and it is believed that Egan was the contractor. By 1839 he was classed a Master Builder and was obtaining commissions from Tuam diocese. He married Margaret Lyons of Tuam on 20 October 1839. Their children were Mary Jane (born 1841, died young), William (1843), Thomas Andrew (1847), John Joseph (1852), Emilea Patricia (1854), Isabel Cecily (1857) and Mary, who also died young.

From 1839 until his death, Egan was in continuous work. His most notable work was the construction of Tuam Town Hall, the foundation stone been laid in 1857. Others include the Glenamaddy workhouse, the bridge at Dunmore, the Presentation Convent, the Presbytery, as well as houses for middle-class and gentry families – Castlegrove, Toghermore, Oakmount and Brownesgrove. In addition, he was responsible for constructing various properties in the suburbs, Dublin Road, Waterslade Place, Foster Terrace, Eastland Row, the Square. Because of this, he is considered 'the builder of Tuam'.

In addition, his obituary stated that he was responsible for erecting nearly all the churches, convents and public buildings within twenty miles of Tuam. These include Kilbannon church.

== Sources ==
- The Mark of a Man:The Life of Andrew Egan, Builder and Architect of Tuam, Deirdre Goggin, pp. 39–62, Journal of the Old Tuam Society, volume one, 2004.
