= Mughron Ua Níoc =

Mughron Ua Níoc (died 1032) was Abbot of Tuam.

Mughron was the first known abbot of Tuam to be mentioned in the annals since the death of Cormac mac Ciaran in 879.

His surname would nowadays be rendered as Ó Niadh and Nee, and is still found in County Galway.

Events which occurred in Ireland and Connacht in his time included:

- 1006 - Death of Fiachra Ua Focarta of Clonfert.
- 1009 - Deaths of Cathal mac Conchobhar, King of Connacht, and his aunt, Dearbhail inion Tadhg mac Cathal .
- 1014 - Battle of Clontarf. The army of Bréifne raid Magh nAi, taking hostages.
- 1023 - Gadhra Mór mac Dundach plunders Clonmacnoise, and carried off many hundred cows from thence.
- 1024 - Murder of Cúán úa Lothcháin.
- 1027 - Death of Gadhra Mór mac Dundach in battle in Osraighe.
- 1032 - Mac-Connacht, i.e. Ua Dunadhaigh, lord of Sil-Anmchadha, was slain.
