= Catherine Corless =

Irish amateur historian

- Born: Catherine Farrell; 1954 (age 71–72); Tuam, County Galway, Ireland
- Occupation: Local historian
- Known for: Investigating the Bon Secours Mother and Baby Home

Catherine Corless (née Farrell; born 1954) is an Irish historian, known for her work in compiling the information concerning the deaths of children at the Catholic Bon Secours Mother and Baby Home in Tuam, Galway.

After gaining an interest in local history from attending an evening course, Corless decided to write an article about the mother and baby home inspired by her own childhood memories of the institution. She spent her spare time searching records in libraries, churches and council offices, and uncovered that 796 children died in the home. She found death certificates but identified that there were no burial records. The bodies were eventually found to have been disposed of in a disused septic tank on the property. She has received a number of awards in recognition of her work, including a People of the Year Award in 2018. Following the 2020 government report on deaths and abuses at Mother and Baby homes, the Irish Taoiseach Micheál Martin called Corless a "tireless crusader of dignity and truth".

== Investigation into the Bon Secours Mother and Baby Home ==
=== Initial research ===
After she wrote a piece for the local history journal on landlords, the editors of the journal were impressed by her work and asked if she would consider submitting another article. Her own memories of the children's home, and attending school with children from the home, sparked her interest in the topic. Corless has related on a number of occasions how she feels guilty about a trick she once played on one of the children from the home, copying a classmate by wrapping up a stone in a sweet wrapper and offering it to a girl who grabbed it, thinking it was a treat.

Corless found that very little had been written concerning the mother and baby home and that extensive research would be required for her article. She started by asking locals on the estate that has been built on the site of the home and was shown the site of a mass grave believed by locals to be famine victims. Corless next turned to Ordnance Survey maps of the area, which indicated the site of the grave to be a septic tank in 1890. She asked for information from the Bon Secours, but was not provided with anything of use. Corless next obtained death certificates for some of the children in the home and realised there was no indication of where the children had been buried. She wrote up her article for the local journal, covering all aspects of the home, and asked the question at the end of her article: had the dead children been buried in the septic tanks?

The article did not gain the attention Corless expected from the authorities and so she did further research into the number of children who had died in the home. Between 2011 and 2013, by paying 4 euro for each record, she obtained 798 death records for children who died in the home, but no burial records.

=== Media coverage ===
Corless initially approached the local media in 2013 concerning the results of her investigations, with the aim of raising funds for a larger memorial on the site, but only a small article was printed. This was followed in February 2014 with a further piece in the Connacht Tribune, again concentrating on the call for a plaque to be installed at the site with the names of those children who had died. She continued her research, talking to several people who had been born in the home or thought relatives may be buried there.

The story broke nationally in 2014, with front-page coverage from the Irish Mail on Sunday. Corless then found herself receiving many requests from the international media. Corless was reportedly upset by some of the speculative nature of the reports, such as the assumption all of the children who died at the home were buried in the septic tank.

In 2017, a Commission of Investigation concluded that remains in an underground structure on the site, which appeared to have been a septic tank, did contain remains of infants that died during the time period the mother and baby home was operating. Corless made several more media appearances following this announcement. She appeared on The Late Late Show in March 2017 to talk about her research. She received a standing ovation from the audience at the conclusion of her interview. She was also featured on the BBC Radio 4 programme Profile and then in 2018 on PM in a segment called The Home Babies.

Corless appeared in the RTÉ documentary No Country for Women in 2018, presenting the story of Julia Carter Devaney who spent the first 45 years of her life in the Tuam mother and baby home. In July 2018, she gave a lecture at the Galway International Arts Festival.

=== Criticism of Corless ===
Corless has received criticism for her research. She has stated that many locals expressed that the matter should have been left alone. She also claimed that she had been told to drop her research and regarding the bodies that she should "just leave them there". Local woman Mary Moriarty also reported hearing locals stating that the matter should be left alone. After the story appeared in the national media, Corless has stated she was contacted by the Bon Secours headquarters in Cork and told that she had upset the older religious sisters and that her information was untrue.

After the Mother and Baby Homes Commission of Investigation concluded that the bodies in the mass grave at the site of the home did date from the time the home was open and were not famine victims, it was widely reported that Corless had been vindicated by the conclusions. Her husband commented that he had not realised there was so much doubt surrounding the conclusions of Corless' research.

=== Support for exhumation ===
Corless has several times made statements supporting the exhumation of the mass grave in Tuam. In 2017, speaking after receiving a Human Rights Award for her work, she said "The ideal would be to exhume those little bodies and just show them some dignity and reverence and to perhaps reinter them in the main Tuam graveyard which is only across the road." She was critical of the consultation process on the future of the site put in place by Galway County Council, and called on the public to show a preference for the option of a full forensic examination, stating this would "bring the long-awaited justice to the families of the babies buried in this tank". She raised the issue again in April 2018, after receipt of her Person of the Year Award.

Critical of the fact money was a factor in the potential future options for the site, Corless said, "There are some suggestions to memorialise the site, but I think that is disrespectful and not acceptable. A full exhumation is now needed. We need to remove the remains of these innocent children – it is no place for them – and give them a respectful burial. It would be part of the healing process for all of the families involved. The only thing stopping a full exhumation is money, and that is not good enough."

Corless turned down an invitation to a reception for Pope Francis's visit to Ireland, and attended a vigil that was held at the same time as the Papal Mass, stating that she was "taking a stand with the babies". In 2020 she wrote to Archbishop Jude Thaddeus Okolo, the Pope's ambassador to Ireland, regarding reinterment of the remains and received a reply that the Archbishop shared the views of the Archbishop of Tuam, that the remains be given a dignified reinterment.

In September 2024, Corless attended a leg of a 62km memorial walk to highlight the 796 missing children and babies at Tuam, with a guard of honour formed by the public. At the end of the walk the names of the children were read from the pages of Corless' book and the Chapel Street Gospel Choir sang. Event founder Valerie Jennings said that: "Catherine was very emotional and very humbled by the event, and to hear the choir. Catherine is a beacon for these children, a huge light. It was very important for us to name the babies, because that is what's all about, and to think of their mothers, but very much to give Catherine Corless appreciation because without her none of us would have known the babies' names and definitely without her [the remains of] these little children would not be exhumed next year."

== Awards ==
Corless has received a number of awards in recognition of her investigation into the Bon Secours Mother and Baby Home. In 2017 she received the Bar of Ireland Human Rights Award in recognition of "exceptional humanitarian service". In her acceptance speech, she said:

I couldn't get my mind around how the sisters could leave that home in 1961, close the gates when it closed down, with 796 children buried beneath in the tunnels in coffins, a lot of them in the sewage tank area as we now know. What kind of mentality would leave that place without acknowledging that so many burials were there, so many precious lives were lost? The ideal would be to exhume those little bodies and just show them some dignity and reverence and to perhaps reinter them in the main Tuam graveyard which is only across the road. Hopefully, the commission of inquiry will give them [the survivors] justice. All they want is an apology and an acknowledgement of what happened to them and their mothers. My work campaigning on behalf of the survivors of mother and baby homes continues and I hope that this special award will give even more survivors the strength to come forward to tell their story. With each and every testimony, the truth is uncovered further and our campaign for justice to prevail is strengthened. I share this award with the all survivors – this is for them.

— Catherine Corless

In the same year she received a Special Award for Investigative Research at Newsbrands Ireland Journalism Awards 2017.

She was made one of Galway's People of the Year in February 2018. In April 2018 Corless was one of The Rehab Group People of the Year Award recipients. She received a standing ovation at the ceremony and was widely praised on Twitter.

The President of Ireland, Michael D Higgins, praised the work of Catherine Corless whilst speaking at the Galway International Arts Festival. Of Corless, Higgins said,"She has demonstrated not only courage and perseverance but a remarkable commitment to uncovering the truth, to historical truth and to moral truth. All of us in this republic owe a debt of gratitude to Catherine for what was an extraordinary act of civic virtue."

In October 2018, Corless was awarded an honorary doctorate by NUI Galway. Making the award, Professor Caroline McGregor of NUIG's School of Political Science and Sociology said Corless' research "sought to re-subjectify the children who had died and their families and relatives because, in the moment of their death, they were treated more like objects to dispose of rather than subjects with right for dignity, justice and respect in life and in death. Her work is not just about a focus on those who died but also those who continue to live with the pain, trauma and hurt in the present."

Corless received an honorary degree from Trinity College Dublin in December 2018. On the same day, the Trinity Long Room Hub hosted an event, "In Conversation with Catherine Corless."

Corless was awarded an Honorary Doctorate of Literature by University College Dublin on 4 September 2019, "For the values of humanity Catherine exemplifies and for the difference she has made to the world."

== Personal life ==
Corless was born in Tuam and has lived in the area since then. She married her husband, Aidan Corless, in 1978. She was a secretary in a textile factory before she gave up work outside the home to be a full-time mother to her four children. She studied local history in an evening course. She discovered her own mother was illegitimate, with no father listed on her birth certificate, and had been raised by foster families.
