= Tuam Town Hall =

Municipal building in Tuam, County Galway, Ireland

- Halla an Bhaile Tuaim
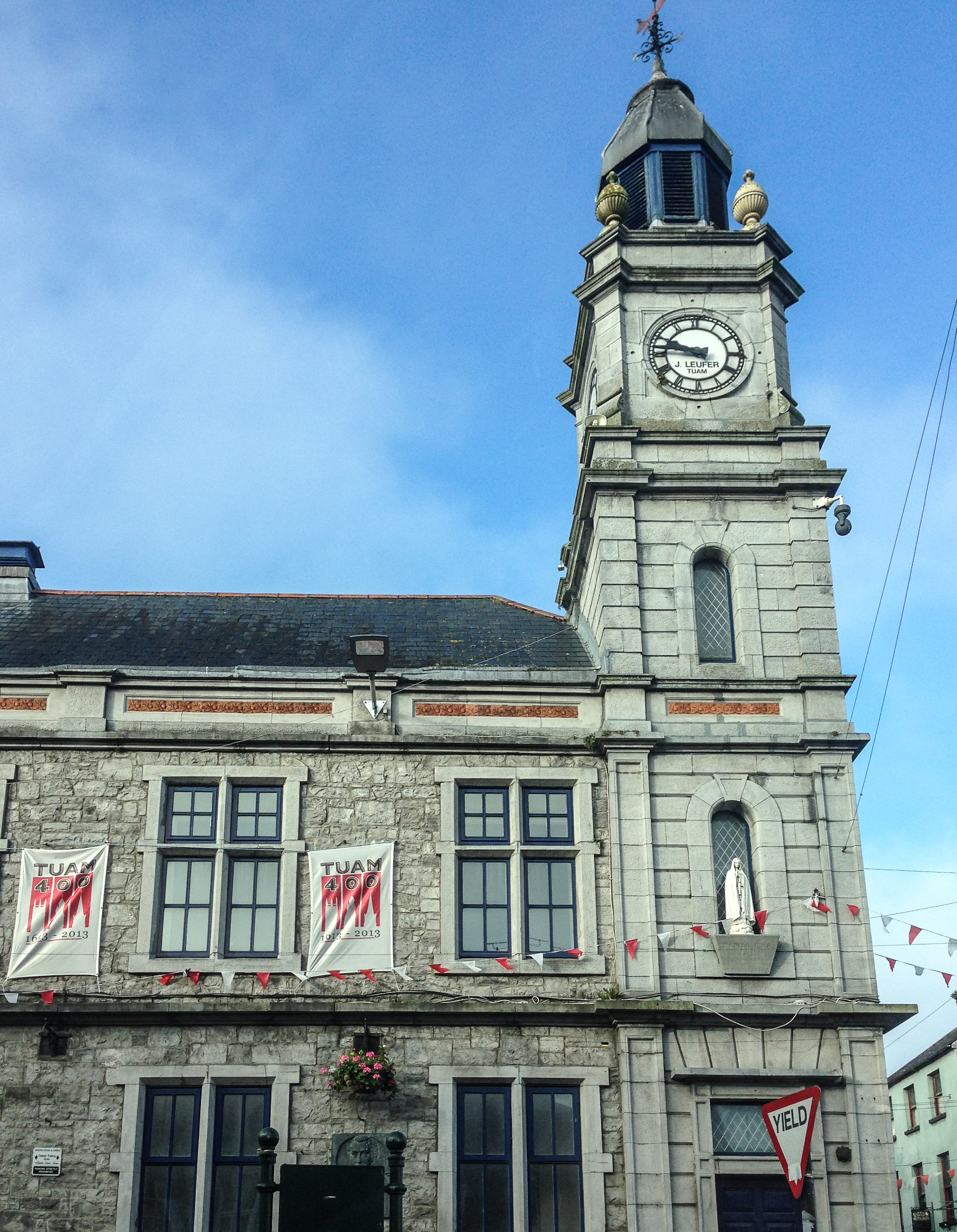
- Tuam Town Hall

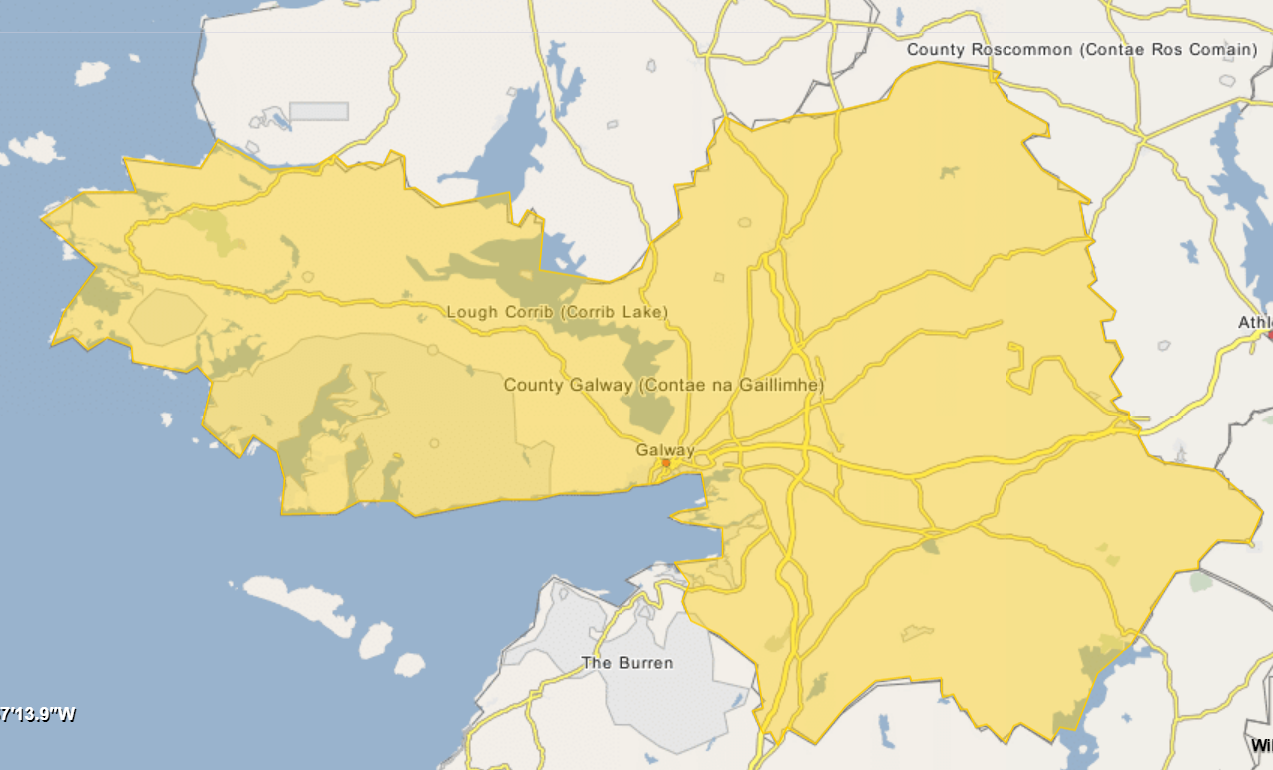
- Location within County Galway

General information
- Architectural style: Neoclassical style
- Location: Market Square, Tuam, Ireland
- Coordinates: 53.5147°N 8.8514°W
- Completed: 1857

Design and construction
- Architect: James Joseph Boylan

Tuam Town Hall (Irish: Halla an Bhaile Tuaim) is a municipal building in the Market Square at Tuam, County Galway, Ireland. It is currently used as a community events venue.

== History ==
The first municipal building in the town was a small market house which was built on the southwest side of the Market Square in 1700. It was arcaded on the ground floor, so that markets could be held, with an assembly room for the use of Tuam Corporation on the first floor. The corporation was abolished under the Municipal Corporations (Ireland) Act 1840 and the building lay empty until town commissioners were appointed in 1843. The town commissioners decided to demolish the old market house and to replace it with a more substantial structure. The site was made available by the local landowner, John Stratford Handcock of Carrowntryla House, on a leasehold basis at a nominal rent.

The foundation stone for the new building was laid by the landowners' wife, Elizabeth Penelope Handcock, on 24 September 1857. It was designed by James Joseph Boylan in the neoclassical style, built by Andrew Egan in coursed limestone and was completed in 1857. The design involved an asymmetrical main frontage of six bays facing onto the Market Square. The main block of five bays was fenestrated by mullioned windows with architraves on the ground floor and by mullioned and transomed windows with architraves on the first floor. The right-hand bay, which was faced in ashlar stone, featured a four-stage tower, which was flanked by full-height pilasters. There was a doorway with a rectangular fanlight in the first stage, recessed round headed lancet windows in the second and third stages, and clock faces in the fourth stage, which was enhanced by canted corners and finials. The tower was surmounted by an octagonal lantern. At roof level, there was a parapet with terracotta panels. Internally, the principal room was the assembly hall on the first floor.

The building was extended by three bays to the south to a design by Edward Townsend in 1886. Following an ambush in which two police officers were killed on 19 July 1920, the Black and Tans set fire to the town hall in retribution. The building was gutted internally by the fire, but the shell remained intact and the building was completely restored in 1926.

A plaque was installed on the front of the building, intended to commemorate the life of the local historian, John Waldron, following his death in 1987. Additional plaques were installed, in 1998, to commemorate the life of the Christian socialist and philanthropist Robert Malachy Burke, following his death that year, as well as the life of the locally born soldier, Major Richard W. Dowling, who led the Confederate troops to victory at the Second Battle of Sabine Pass during the American Civil War. A fourth plaque, intended to commemorate the lives of local service personnel who had died all wars, foreign and domestic, was installed in 2013.

In September 2017, an independent councillor proposed removing the plaque relating to Dowling, in the light of the 2017 Charlottesville disturbances. Nobody seconded the motion; a Fianna Fáil councillor said the plaque commemorated Dowling's business career and Tuam had "more important things going on".

The building was the starting point for a march, on 26 August 2018, to the site of the Bon Secours Mother and Baby Home, where the bodies of up to 800 babies and children may have been interred in an unmarked grave. The march was timed to coincide with a mass being celebrated by Pope Francis in Phoenix Park, Dublin, during his visit to Ireland.

In 2020, Galway County Council announced that it was considering proposals to convert the building, which continues to be used for community events, into an arts centre.
