= Yvonne Murphy =

Irish judge

Yvonne Murphy is a former judge of the Irish Circuit Court from 1998 to 2012. She has acted as chair of several Commissions of Investigation and an inquiry into various child abuse issues within the Catholic Church in Ireland.

== Early career ==
Before practising law, Judge Murphy, a native of County Donegal in Ulster, worked with the National Social Service Board and was responsible for setting up a network of citizens’ information centres throughout Ireland. She practised at the Bar on the Northern and Dublin Circuits and is a member of the Bar of England and Wales and of the Bar of Northern Ireland. She is a former Vice-Chair of the Employment Equality Agency and of the Employment Appeals Tribunal. While in practice at the Bar, she was co-Editor of the Irish Times Law Reports and authored several books and articles.

== Personal life ==
Murphy was married to the late Justice Adrian Hardiman, judge of the Supreme Court of Ireland; the couple had three sons.

== Commissions of Investigation and inquiry ==
In 2006, Murphy was appointed chair of the Commission of Investigation into sexual abuse by Catholic clergy from, or attached to, the Archdiocese of Dublin between 1 January 1975 and 1 May 2004. That Commission culminated in the production of the Murphy Report in 2009.

Murphy then also chaired an inquiry into sexual abuse in the Roman Catholic Diocese of Cloyne, which led to the publication of the Cloyne Report in July 2011.

In 2015, Murphy was appointed chair of the Mother and Baby Homes Commission of Investigation, following revelations about the burial of 800 children in unmarked mass graves in the Bon Secours Mother and Baby Home. The executive summary and conclusion of the report have been subject to much criticism since its publication.
