= Bon Secours Mother and Baby Home =

Maternity home and mass grave in Tuam, Galway, Ireland

Coordinates: 53.50765°N 8.84291°W

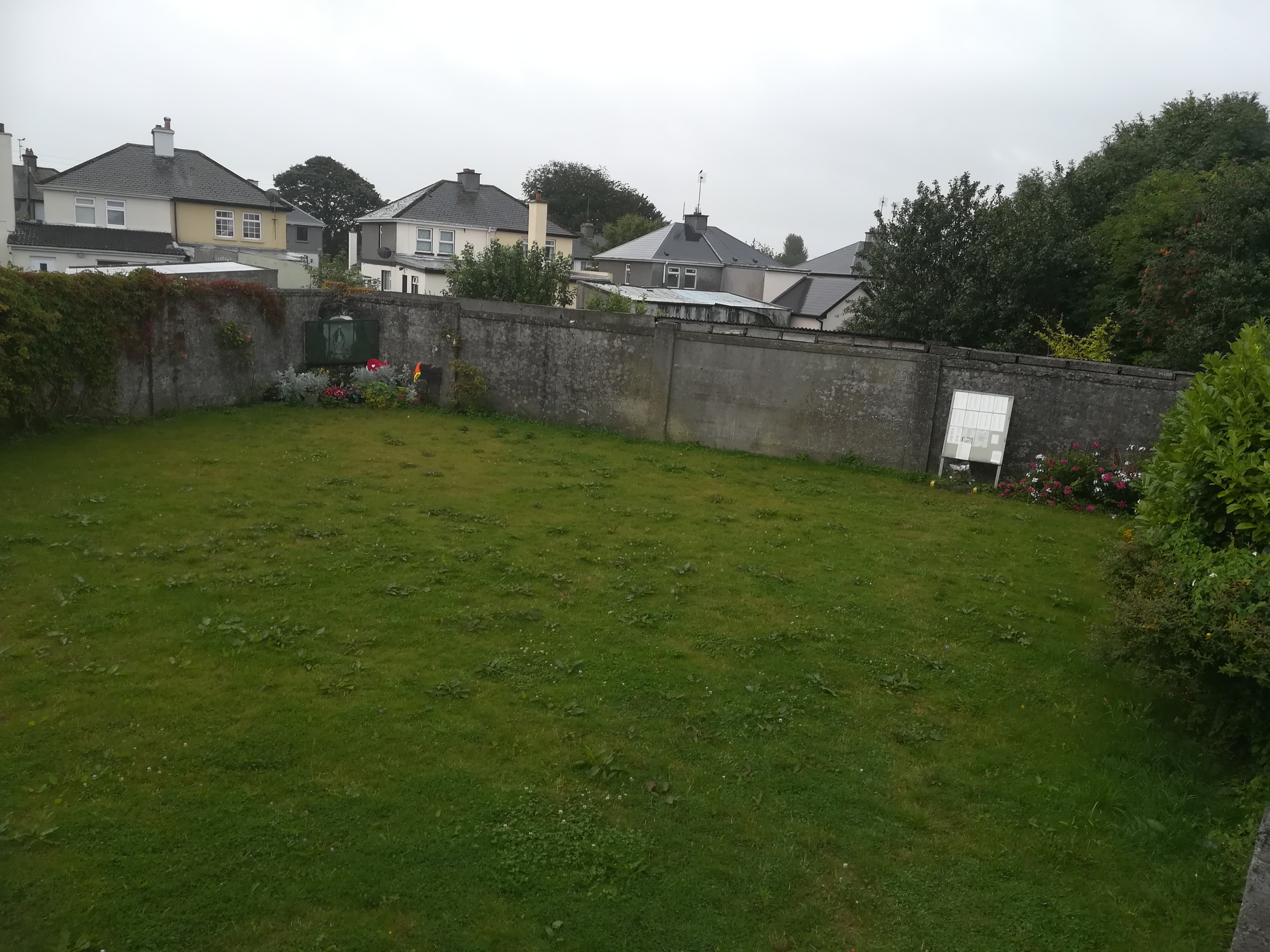
Mass grave at the Bon Secours Mother and Baby Home, Tuam, Galway

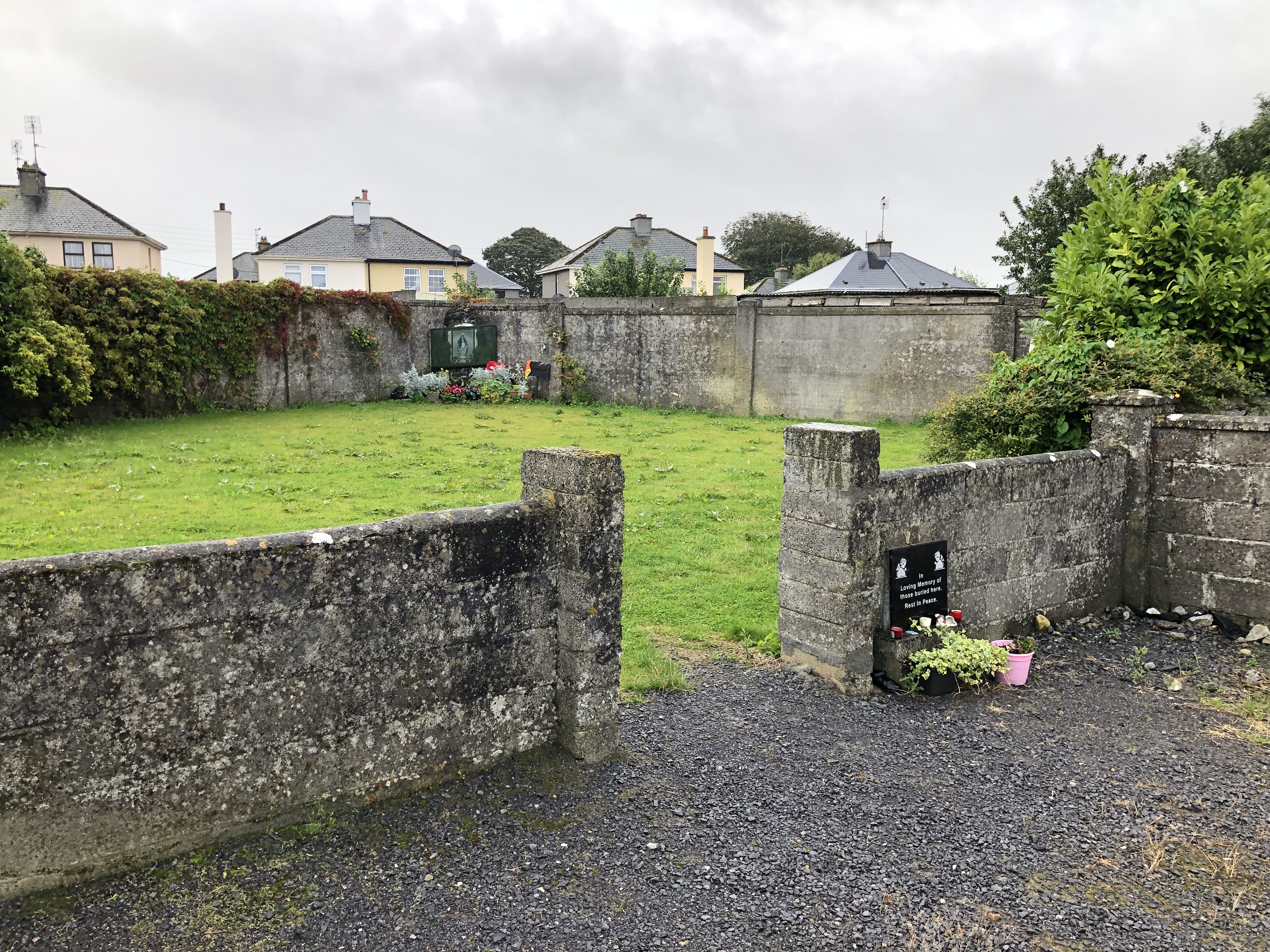
View of the mass grave at the Bon Secours Mother and Baby Home, Tuam, County Galway

The Bon Secours Mother and Baby Home, also known as St Mary's, or simply the Home, operated in Tuam, County Galway, Ireland, from 1925 to 1961 as a Catholic-run institution for unmarried mothers and their children, on behalf of Galway County Council.

Run by the Bon Secours Sisters, the Home became the focus of national scandal after historian Catherine Corless uncovered that 796 infants and children had died there, many of whom were reported to be buried in an unmarked mass grave within a former septic tank. Subsequent investigations identified high infant mortality, allegations of illegal adoptions, and systemic neglect. A 2017 excavation confirmed the presence of juvenile remains, prompting a state apology and legislation enabling full exhumation. Preparatory forensic work began in 2023, and full excavation commenced in July 2025 to recover, identify, and rebury the remains in a dedicated memorial garden at the Tuam site.

The revelations surrounding the Tuam home sparked widespread public outrage, international media coverage, and renewed scrutiny of Ireland's history of Catholic institutional abuse. Survivors, advocacy groups, and political figures called for accountability and transparency, leading to state investigations, formal apologies, and reforms addressing past practices within religious‑run facilities.

== History ==
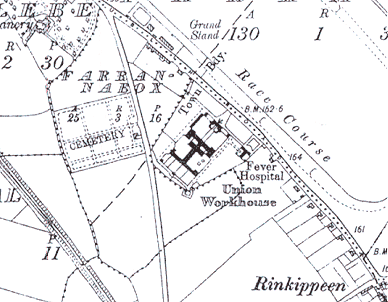
The old workhouse, on the Athenry Road, 1918.

Between 1925 and 1961 in Tuam, a town in County Galway, the Bon Secours Sisters ran a facility known locally as "The Home", officially St Mary's Mother and Baby Home, on behalf of Galway County Council. It was a Catholic institution where thousands of unmarried pregnant women were taken to give birth. The building had previously served as a workhouse and later as a military barracks.

=== Workhouse and military barracks ===
The building that eventually became "The Home" was originally built in 1841 as a workhouse under the Irish Poor Laws, intended to house destitute people during the Great Famine. Like many other workhouses, it was designed by Poor Law Commissioners' architect George Wilkinson to accommodate about 800 people. The workhouse opened in 1846, five years after construction was completed, during the height of the Famine. In addition to dormitories, the main building included an infirmary and what was then referred to as an "idiots' ward", reflecting the terminology of the period. Sheds were constructed on the property to house additional inmates and fever victims, and a fever hospital was later built next door. After the Famine, the workhouse continued to house the poor and homeless for more than 60 years.

In 1916, during the Easter Rising, British troops occupied the workhouse, evicted its residents, and repurposed the building as a barracks. Seven years later, during the Irish Civil War, six anti-Treaty IRA volunteers – Seamus Ó Máille, Martin Moylan, John Newell, John McGuire, Michael Monaghan, and Frank Cunnane – were imprisoned and executed at the site by Irish Free State forces on 11 April 1923, followed by two others in the weeks that followed. These executions were among the final carried out during the conflict. When the Sisters later assumed control of the building, they erected a crucifix in memory of the executed men.

=== Mother and Baby Home ===
The Catholic order of Bon Secours Sisters, led by Mother Hortense McNamara, took over the Tuam Workhouse in 1925 at the request of the local authority and converted it into "The Home". This followed the closure of all workhouses in County Galway by the Board of Health, and the transfer of the hospital wing from Glenamaddy Workhouse to Tuam.

Unmarried women who became pregnant were sent to give birth there, rather than at home or in hospital. The Sisters may have included trained nurses, but were extremely unlikely to have been midwives, as the Papal prohibition on nuns attending births remained in place until 1936. In 1927, the Board of Health directed that a maternity ward be added so that mothers could be housed separately from the general wards; this was built in 1929. The women were required to remain in the Home for one year, performing unpaid labour for the Sisters as reimbursement for services rendered. They were separated from their children, who were raised in the institution until they could be adopted – often without maternal consent.

Some women who had experienced two pregnancies outside marriage were sent directly to nearby Magdalene laundries after giving birth, as punishment for their perceived "recidivism", a term euphemistically used to describe repeated sexual transgression. Historian Maria Luddy notes that, "Such a stance, though not intended to be penal, allowed for the development of an attitude that accepted detention as a means of protecting society from these reoffending women."

The County Council paid the nuns £1 per week for each mother and for each child in the Home. (In 1949, average female earnings were £2.97 per week; a loaf of bread cost three pence, and a stone of potatoes (6.35 kg) cost 14 pence).

At the end of the year, the mothers left while their babies were typically kept at the Home. The children remained until they could be adopted, fostered, or were old enough to be sent to industrial boarding schools. Contemporary concerns were voiced in The Tuam Herald, which reported in October 1953 that "an effort was not always made to find the home that most suited the child or the child that most suited the home. The allowance given to foster parents was not always spent on the child's welfare." Local historian Catherine Corless documented a case in which a mother, having found work in England, paid the nuns to care for her son. Unbeknownst to her, the child had been fostered out, while the nuns continued to accept her payments. Some babies were sent to clergy in the United States for adoption by Catholic families, often without maternal consent or legal oversight.

A 1947 inspection by the Department of Local Government and Public Health found that some children at the Home were suffering from malnutrition, with 12 of the 31 infants examined described as "emaciated and not thriving". The Home was overcrowded, housing 271 children and 61 mothers. Death rates were extraordinarily high: 34 percent of children died in 1943; 25 percent in 1944; 23 percent in 1945; and 27 percent in 1946. The report noted: "The death rate amongst infants is high... The death rate had appeared to be on the decrease but has now begun to rise again. It is time to enquire into the possible cause before the death rate mounts higher." Despite this, the inspector concluded: "The care given to infants in the Home is good, the Sisters are careful and attentive; diets are excellent. It is not here that we must look for cause of the death rate."

An inspection conducted in 1949 by Galway County Council reported that "everything in the home [was] in good order" and congratulated the Sisters on "the excellent condition of their Institution".

The Bon Secours Mother and Baby Home closed in 1961, and most of the mothers and children remaining at the time were transferred to similar institutions, including Sean Ross Abbey in Roscrea. The building remained largely unused until its demolition in 1972, and a new housing estate was subsequently built on the site.

== Mass grave ==
=== 1975 find ===
In 1975, two boys, Franny Hopkins and Barry Sweeney, aged 10 and 12, were playing at the site of the former Mother and Baby Home when they discovered an underground chamber beneath a concrete slab, reportedly "filled to the brim" with children's skeletons. One of them later recalled seeing around 20 skeletons. The slab was believed by some to have covered the Home's former septic tank.

Local speculation at the time suggested the remains might belong to victims of the Great Famine, unbaptised infants, or stillborn babies from the Home. The number of bodies was then unknown, but was assumed to be small. The chamber was re-sealed shortly afterwards, following prayers said at the site by a local priest. For the next 35 years, a local couple tended the site and constructed a small grotto in its memory.

=== 2012 article ===
In 2012, local historian Catherine Corless published an article about the Tuam Home in the annual Journal of the Old Tuam Society. In 2013, at Corless's request – and at her own expense – Ann Glennon, a registrar of births, deaths and marriages at the Galway Health Service Executive, retrieved the names of 796 children whose death certificates listed "The Tuam Home" or "Tuam Children’s Home" as the place of death. Most were infants who died during the Home's operation between 1925 and 1961.

Corless studied state-issued death certificates and found causes of death including tuberculosis, convulsions, measles, whooping cough, influenza, and malnutrition – particularly marasmus-related malnutrition. She then cross-referenced the names with local graveyard records and found that only two of the children had documented burials. Based on this, Corless concluded that the most plausible location for the remains was the site where skeletons had been discovered in 1975. Historical maps indicated that this area had once housed the Home's septic tank. Corless believed that some of the remains found were located within the tank itself. The burial ground was unmarked, unregistered, and undocumented; no official records were kept. The site was widely described by international media and commentators as a "mass grave".

Corless's conclusions were supported by some local residents who recalled seeing nuns and workmen apparently burying remains there late in the evenings. A similar discovery occurred in 2010, when researchers uncovered a mass grave in Dublin containing the remains of 222 infants from Bethany Home, a Protestant-run maternity and children's institution.

=== 2014 media coverage ===
In April 2014, Corless's research into the Tuam Mother and Baby Home gained wider public attention during the dedication of a memorial to the 222 children who died at Bethany Home. Corless has since campaigned for a similar grave marker to be placed at the Tuam site.

In late May and early June 2014, numerous news outlets reported on the alleged existence of a mass grave containing the remains of up to 800 infants at Tuam, based on Corless's research. The initial story was published by journalist Alison O'Reilly in the Irish Mail on Sunday, and was soon picked up by international media. The revelations provoked widespread outrage, both in Ireland and abroad.

The Irish government came under pressure to launch an investigation. The government called the allegations "deeply disturbing" and ordered the police to begin a preliminary investigation, with the aim of launching an inquiry.

==== Reaction to the reports ====
After the issue received global attention in 2014, some commentators, in advance of official factfinding investigations, criticised the story and proffered alternative explanations for the presence of bodies in a septic tank. Some of their suggested explanations were not supported or were actively disproved by the subsequent 2017 Mother and Baby Homes Commission of Investigation interim report, following excavations of the site.

Local Gardaí initially surmised that any bones on the site likely dated from the Great Famine in the 19th century: "These are historical burials going back to famine times. There is no suggestion of any impropriety." Bones of famine victims had been found nearby in 2012, and archaeologists determined that they were 19th-century "paupers" from the same Tuam Poor Law Union Workhouse which had originally occupied the building later used for the Bon Secours Children's Home. The Gardaí were later ordered to investigate and issue a report on their findings by the Minister for Justice.

Data from the National Archives from 1947 showed that during the preceding 12 months, the death rate of children in Bon Secours was almost twice that of some other mother and baby homes. A government inter-departmental report into the records stated that an "assessment of mortality rates will need public health specialist/historical analysis of statistics on children born and resident at the home in Tuam".

Liam Delaney said the high child death rate at the Bon Secours Mother and Baby Home could not be explained by higher overall child death rates at the time, nor by the higher death rate among "illegitimate" children. He added: "This points to something serious within these institutions."

Kevin Higgins, a solicitor representing former residents, said that the number of deaths recorded at the Tuam Home over a period of over more than 30 years was "off the scale" compared to the rate of children's deaths elsewhere at the same time.

==== Additional coverage ====
An RTÉ documentary in the Would You Believe series, on the topic of the Tuam Babies, was broadcast on 12 April 2015.

In October 2017, The New York Times published an extended multimedia article, The Lost Children of Tuam, by Dan Barry and others, covering the Home, the children, and the burial site.

In November 2022, TheJournal.ie published a podcast series titled Redacted Lives. Episode 3, Tuam, focuses on the Bon Secours Mother and Baby Home.

The 2017 New York Times article, The Lost Children of Tuam, was optioned as a film by Liam Neeson. It was released in 2026, with Neeson as producer, and stars Monica Dolan as Catherine Corless, who was also a co-producer. The film premiered at the Galway Film Fleadh in July 2026, where it won the award for Best Irish Film.

== HSE child trafficking allegation ==
On 3 June 2015, the Irish Examiner published a special report which claimed that the Health Services Executive (HSE) had voiced concerns in 2012 that up to a thousand children may have been trafficked from the Home, and recommending that the then health minister, James Reilly, be informed so that "a fully fledged, fully resourced forensic investigation and state inquiry" could be launched.

The issue had arisen within the HSE when a principal social worker responsible for adoption discovered "a large archive of photographs, documentation and correspondence relating to children sent for adoption to the USA" and "documentation in relation to discharges and admissions to psychiatric institutions in the Western area".

The HSE noted that letters from the Bon Secours Mother and Baby Home to parents asked for money for the upkeep of their children and notes that the duration of stay for children may have been prolonged by the order for financial reasons. It also uncovered letters to parents asking for money for the upkeep of some children that had already been discharged or had died. The social worker had compiled a list of "up to 1,000 names". HSE reports mentioned the possibility that up to 1,000 children had been trafficked for adoption. One of those reports mentioned that it was possible that death certificates were falsified so children could be "brokered for adoption", which could "prove to be a scandal that dwarfs other, more recent issues with the Church and State."

The report noted that deaths recorded at the Bessborough mother and baby home in Cork dropped "dramatically" in 1950 with the introduction of adoption legislation, stating "This...may point to babies being identified for adoption, principally to the USA, but have been recorded as infant deaths in Ireland and notified to the parents accordingly." The Bon Secours Sisters in a statement said "As the Commission of Investigation has now been established the Sisters of Bon Secours do not believe it would be appropriate to comment further except to say that they will co-operate fully with that commission."

The October 2012 HSE memo recommended that due to the gravity of the issue, the then Health Minister be informed with a view towards launching a full inquiry. That did not happen, with the Minister only becoming involved following the revelations in the press of a mass grave at the Home in May 2014.

The report states that if thousands of babies were illegally adopted to the United States, without the willing consent of the birth mother, then this practice was facilitated by doctors, social workers, religious orders, and many more people in positions of authority. The report states that there is a real danger that some of these people may still work within the system.

Writing in a 2012 HSE report, Declan McKeown, a consultant public health physician and medical epidemiologist stated that the infant mortality rate in the Home were "similar to those recorded at Bessborough" (another mother and baby home), which were five times the rate for Ireland in 1950 and 65 times the 2012 rate. McKeown stated that these rates were equivalent to the infant mortality rate in Ireland in the 1700s.

The commission's report subsequently found that the 2012 HSE report was based on conjecture accepted as fact, and that overseas adoptions had been overestimated in the case of Tuam. The "large archive of photographs, documentation and letters" was revealed to be just two passport photographs and the original source witness had found no evidence of trafficking of babies. However, the Commission concluded that allegations of foreign adoptions for money were "impossible to prove and impossible to disprove."

== Commission of Investigation ==
Following the revelations about the mass grave, there were calls locally and internationally for an investigation of the Tuam site and an inquiry into all such mother and baby homes. The Gardaí had initially released a statement saying "These are historical burials going back to famine times. There is no suggestion of any impropriety and there is no garda investigation. Also, there is no confirmation from any source that there are between 750 and 800 bodies present." On 4 June 2014 the Irish government announced it was putting together representatives from various government departments to investigate the deaths at the Home and propose how to address the issue. The then Minister for Children and Youth Affairs Charles Flanagan said any government inquiry would not be confined to the Home in Tuam and that officials would advise the Government on the best form of inquiry before the end of June 2014.

On 6 June, two senior Gardaí were appointed to lead a "fact-finding" mission. They were asked to gather all surviving records and to carry out preliminary tests on the suspected mass grave. Gardaí said there was no criminal investigation as yet because there was no evidence of a crime, but senior sources said the review may change that.

On 16 July 2014, the Irish Government appointed Judge Yvonne Murphy to chair the Commission of Investigation into Mother and Baby homes. In October 2014, the Minister for Children and Youth Affairs, James Reilly, announced that the draft terms of reference for the inquiry had been circulated to government departments for comment.

In September 2014, a legal representative of former residents of the Home has called on the Attorney General to order coroner's inquests to be carried out into the deaths. This would necessitate excavations and exhumations of the site, which is authorised under the 1962 Coroner's Act.

On 19 February 2015, the then Minister for Children, James Reilly, announced that the terms of reference had been set out for the "establishment of the independent commission, which has a three-year deadline and which will cost approximately €21 million, followed the signing by the Taoiseach of a Government order at Tuesday's Cabinet meeting". The three-person Commission comprises Judge Yvonne Murphy as chairperson, with international legal expert on child protection and adoption Dr William Duncan, and historian Professor Mary E. Daly, appointed as Commissioners.

On 25 May 2015, a remembrance ceremony for those who died at the Bon Secours Mother and Baby Home was organised by a coalition of survivors' groups and was held outside Government Buildings. The organisers also sought:

- "A separate and immediate acknowledgment, apology and redress to an aging survivor community"
- "Full Inclusion. All single mothers and their children who were forcibly separated are to be included in the Commission of Inquiry as well as any home or institution related to these activities including all illegal activities."
- "Senator Averil Power's Adoption Bill to be passed within six months to open all lifelong sealed adoption files"

=== 2017 find ===
On 3 March 2017, the Mother and Baby Homes Commission of Investigation announced that human remains had been found during a test excavation carried out at the site between November 2016 and February 2017. Tests conducted on some of the remains indicated they had been aged between 35 foetal weeks and 2–3 years. The announcement confirmed that the deceased died during the period of time that the property was used by the Mother and Baby Home, not from an earlier period, as most of the bodies dated from the 1920s to the 1950s. The remains were found in an "underground structure divided into 20 chambers". While some speculated that this indicated that "children who died at the Home were interred on the site in unmarked graves, a common practice at such Catholic-run facilities amid high child mortality rates in early 20th-century Ireland," the Commission said "it had not yet determined what the purpose of this structure was but it appeared to be a sewage tank. The commission had also not yet determined if it was ever used for this purpose."

The Commission stated that it was continuing its investigation into who was responsible for the disposal of human remains in this way, that it had also asked the relevant State authorities to take responsibility for the appropriate treatment of the remains, and that it had notified the coroner. Minister for Children, Katherine Zappone, said that the coroner's results would determine the direction of the investigation and that the commission would determine if other sites needed to be excavated, including another part of the Tuam site.

The Adoption Rights Alliance and Justice for Magdalenes Research campaign groups demanded that Zappone publish a five-month-old report from the commission on the issue of broadening the probe's terms of reference beyond the original 18 institutions included, and said the State must ensure that all human remains buried in unmarked graves at institutions in Ireland are identified.

=== Reactions ===
==== Political reactions ====
Then Taoiseach, Enda Kenny, described the findings as "truly appalling", saying "the babies of single mothers involved had been treated like some kind of sub-species." He commended the work of Catherine Corless in bringing the issue to light. Speaking on the find in Dáil Éireann, in response to requests to widen the terms of reference of the Commission, he described the Mother and Baby Home as "a chamber of horrors".

No nuns broke into our homes to kidnap our children. We gave them up to what we convinced ourselves was the nuns' care. We gave them up maybe to spare them the savagery of gossip, the wink and the elbow language of delight in which the holier than thous were particularly fluent. We gave them up because of our perverse, in fact, morbid relationship with what is called respectability. Indeed, for a while it seemed as if in Ireland our women had the amazing capacity to self-impregnate. For their trouble, we took their babies and gifted them, sold them, trafficked them, starved them, neglected them or denied them to the point of their disappearance from our hearts, our sight, our country and, in the case of Tuam and possibly other places, from life itself.

— Enda Kenny

In the same debate, AAA-PBP T.D. Bríd Smith called for the Bon Secours order of nuns to be disbanded. She said "its hospital empire, the biggest private hospital group in the State, was built on the bones of the dead Tuam babies." Smith said "everyone was not responsible for what happened in Tuam. It was paid for by the State, which knew exactly what was going on, and there were 'headage payments' of up to $3,000 for each child sent to the United States."

The Taoiseach's speech was criticised by some. In the Dáil, independent member Catherine Connolly directly addressed the speech, stating:

A shocking discovery, according to everyone, and particularly to yourself Taoiseach. But this is something that Galway has been aware of for a long time, highlighted by Catherine Corless back in 2014, in her painstaking and self-funded research. By the witnesses, the many, many women who went before the commission of inquiry into child abuse which culminated in the Ryan Report, as far back as 2009. They told their stories about their experience in Mother and Baby Homes. It was brought to the attention of Martin McAleese when he concluded his report on the Magdalene laundries. So none of this is shocking to the survivors. What is shocking to the survivors, and to me, is the carefully crafted words that you've come into the chamber with. And, in particular, that you say 'no nuns broke into our homes to kidnap our children', 'we gave them up to what we convinced ourselves was the nuns' care' and so on. I don't doubt your bona fides, a thaoisigh, but I certainly doubt your judgement in reading that out, a carefully crafted speech with a sentence like that in these circumstances. My question: please answer. Where is the interim report that has sat with the minister since September last year? Please confirm that the site will be sealed off as any crime scene is sealed off.

— Catherine Connolly

Leader of Fianna Fáil, Micheál Martin T.D., called for a state apology for the infants, a commemoration to be held for them, and for the expansion of the Commission of Inquiry to include other institutions and sites.

The then Minister for Justice, Frances Fitzgerald, stated that "the discovery is an infinitely sad reminder of an Ireland that was a very harsh, harsh place for women and their babies" and that "it shows the tortured relationship the State and church had with pregnant women – it is a tragedy that we are now facing in its entirety."

The President of Ireland, Michael D. Higgins, speaking about the find at an International Women's Day reception, said there "are dark shadows that hang over our meeting, shadows that require us all to summon up yet again a light that might dispel the darkness to which so many women and their children were condemned, and the questions left unanswered as we moved on." President Higgins described Catherine Corless' work as "another necessary step in blowing open the locked doors of a hidden Ireland".

==== Reaction by the Catholic Church ====
The Catholic Archbishop of Tuam, Michael Neary, said that he is horrified by the confirmation that significant quantities of human remains were buried on the site of a former mother and baby home in the town. Describing the news as "a body blow", he said he had been "greatly shocked to learn of the scale of the practice during the time in which the Bon Secours ran the mother and baby home in Tuam."

The Irish Catholic Bishops' Conference apologised for the hurt caused by its part in the system, which they said also involved adoptions. They also urged parishes to ensure that the burial sites of former residents are appropriately marked, and said that "the appalling story of life, death and adoptions related to the Mother and Baby Homes has shocked everyone in Ireland and beyond."

==== Reactions of Catherine Corless and Irish media ====
Both TV3 and RTÉ broadcast documentaries on the scandal, with the latter's Claire Byrne Live including a segment listing the names of all 796 children who had died at the Home.

Corless appeared on The Late Late Show on 10 March 2017, alongside Tuam survivor Peter Mulryan, whose sister is buried in the Tuam grave, Anna Corrigan, whose two brothers were born in Tuam, and journalist Alison O'Reilly, who broke the story. Corless received a standing ovation at the end of the segment. Host Ryan Tubridy said "If that audience represents the people watching tonight, there is a hunger in this country for the truth."

Corless was awarded the Bar Council of Ireland's Human Rights Award in October 2017, an award presented for "exceptional humanitarian service". In her acceptance speech, she said:

I couldn't get my mind around how the sisters could leave that home in 1961, close the gates when it closed down, with 796 children buried beneath in the tunnels in coffins, a lot of them in the sewage tank area as we now know. What kind of mentality would leave that place without acknowledging that so many burials were there, so many precious lives were lost? The ideal would be to exhume those little bodies and just show them some dignity and reverence and to perhaps reinter them in the main Tuam graveyard which is only across the road. Hopefully the commission of inquiry will give them [the survivors] justice. All they want is an apology and an acknowledgment of what happened to them and their mothers. My work campaigning on behalf of the survivors of mother and baby homes continues and I hope that this special award will give even more survivors the strength to come forward to tell their story. With each and every testimony, the truth is uncovered further and our campaign for justice to prevail is strengthened. I share this award with the all survivors—this is for them.

— Catherine Corless

Paul McGarry, SC, chairman of Bar Council, in presenting the award, said of Corless "She has worked tirelessly on their behalf and has shone a light on a dark period of our history, passionately represented the victims and their rights at all times, often in the face of adversity. She epitomises the very essence of a humanitarian and is a very deserving recipient of this award."

In October 2018, Corless was awarded an honorary doctorate by NUI Galway. Making the award, Professor Caroline McGregor of NUIG's School of Political Science and Sociology said Corless' research "sought to re-subjectify the children who had died and their families and relatives because in the moment of their death, they were treated more like objects to dispose of rather than subjects with right for dignity, justice and respect in life and in death. Her work is not just about a focus on those who died but also those who continue to live with the pain, trauma and hurt in the present." She received an honorary degree from Trinity College Dublin in December 2018.

=== Investigation team ===
In June 2017, Zappone announced the appointment of an "Expert Technical Group" team of international experts, comprising an Irish-based forensic archaeologist, a US-based forensic anthropologist and a UK-based forensic scientist, to investigate the burial site. Zappone also said that she was considering broadening the terms of reference for the Commission, in order to "help to answer some of the questions which have been raised again in public debate". The team is led by Dr. Niamh McCullagh, who previously worked with the Independent Commission for the Location of Victims' Remains in Northern Ireland and the Joint Prisoner of War/Missing in Action Command that aimed to locate the bodies of war dead.

Zappone stated that McCullagh will identify options for government, looking at the possibility of exhuming the remains and identifying if there are any further remains on the site that have yet to be discovered.

The team conducted an extensive geophysical survey on the site in July 2017. This consisted of data collection through a variety of non-invasive techniques, over the course of five days. The team liaised with the Coroner for North Galway, the Garda Síochána, the National Monuments Services and Forensic Science Ireland, and advice was received from the International Committee for the Red Cross.

=== Expert Technical Group report ===
In December 2017, the Expert Technical Group reported to the Department of Children and Youth Affairs, outlining five possible courses of action on the Tuam site. The five possible courses of action outlined are:

- Memorialisation: No further investigative work; Return the site to being managed as a memorial; Make site safe for public access.
- Exhume known human remains: Recover human remains interred in the chambered structure identified to date and reinter elsewhere; No further forensic analysis of remains.
- Forensic excavation and recovery of known human remains: Complete forensic archaeological excavation, recovery and analysis of human remains from the chambers identified to date.
- Forensic excavation and recovery, and further evaluation/excavation of other areas of potential burial/interest: Complete forensic excavation and recovery of all human remains in memorial garden and any other targeted area, following geophysical survey, assessment of witness statements, historical records, etc.
- Forensic excavation of total available area: Full forensic and archaeological excavation of all available ground formerly occupied by the M&B Home. A total of 0.4 hectares (0.99 acres), comprising memorial garden, playground, car park etc. Excludes private built areas (houses and gardens etc. subsequently built on the former site).

Zappone said that before any decision was taken on the option to be used, she first wanted to consult with the local community in Tuam and other affected parties, such as relatives of those who were resident in the Home. She said the consultation process, which would be undertaken by Galway County Council, would take three months.

The Tuam Home Survivors Network said its members had given careful consideration to the Expert Technical Group's report and that the only appropriate action was "a complete excavation of the Tuam site to ensure the recovery of all human remains contained there". The Network are also seeking postmortems in respect of each set of human remains and cataloguing of DNA from all remains in order to create the most complete database possible.

The Technical Group also identified a number of human rights issues which were outside its terms of reference. Zappone appointed human rights expert and Special Rapporteur on Child Protection, Professor Geoffrey Shannon, to examine these issues and to report to her on his findings. Shannon's report was published on 23 October 2018, the same day as the announcement that the Tuam site would be fully excavated.

==== Excavation decision ====
On 23 October 2018, Minister Zappone announced that the Government had approved her recommendation for full forensic excavation of the available site. The approach taken will involve what is known as "Humanitarian Forensic Action" and will include:

- a phased approach to the forensic excavation and recovery of the human remains;
- the use of systematic on-site ground-truthing and test excavations to effectively locate potential burials;
- the forensic analysis of any recovered remains and, where possible, individualisation and identification, and
- arrangements for respectful reburial and memorialisation and the appropriate conservation of the site.

Zappone said "I am committed to ensuring that all the children interred at this site can have a dignified and respectful burial", and that "this comprehensive and scientific approach provides us with the best opportunity to address the many deeply personal questions to which former residents and their families need answers." Zappone said that due to the "unprecedented" nature of the site, bespoke legislation would be required in advance of the commencement of further excavations and forensic and DNA testing, and that drafting of such legislation is expected to commence in November 2018.

Catherine Corless said that the full excavation and DNA testing announced was everything that they had been campaigning for. The Tuam Babies Family Group welcomed the announcement, saying "This is an exceptionally important decision and will pave the way for all the other mother and baby homes, and the lost children of Ireland. We hope this decision will bring peace to the families of these children."

The Bon Secours Sisters have offered a €2.5 million voluntary contribution towards the costs of excavation and forensic excavation, which are estimated at between €6 and €13 million. Zappone stated that this contribution was not a settlement or an indemnity.

In December 2018, the Taoiseach announced that legislation would be required to enable the full excavation to proceed. The required legislation is expected to be passed in the first half of 2019, with procurement of specialist services and planning going ahead at the same time, with the excavations then proceeding in the latter half of 2019. Taoiseach Varadkar said "We've never really done this before in Ireland, on this scale, so we've a lot to set up, a lot to learn before we do it. We're not entirely sure what we're getting into, but as a Government we're convinced this is the right thing to do, to remove the remains and to give those children a proper decent burial they didn't get."

In March 2023 an office was set up to supervise an excavation of the graves.

Excavations began in June 2023.

=== Final report ===
The final report of the Commission was submitted to the Minister for Children, Equality, Disability, Integration and Youth on 30 October 2020 and was published on 12 January 2021. The report detailed an "appalling level of infant mortality at mother-and-baby homes," and stated that "in the years before 1960 mother-and-baby homes did not save the lives of 'illegitimate' children; in fact, they appear to have significantly reduced their prospects of survival". It found that 9,000 children had died in the 18 institutions covered by the Commission's terms of reference, between 1922 and 1998, an infant mortality rate almost double that of the general population, and that one in seven died. It was also announced that the Taoiseach, Micheál Martin, would apologise to survivors on behalf of the state.

== Pope's visit to Ireland, August 2018 ==
Zappone raised the issue of the mass grave with Pope Francis when she met him on his visit to Áras an Uachtaráin on 25 August, and presented him with a memorandum on the issue, telling him: "I hope the church will make reparations for this shameful chapter. It is important and I will write to you in detail." Speaking to members of the press, Pope Francis said "She told me, and she was brief: 'Holy Father, we found mass graves of children, buried children, we're investigating... and the Church has something to do with this.' But she said it very politely and truly with a lot of respect. I thanked her to the point that this had touched my heart."

A march from Tuam Town Hall to the Bon Secours site and a subsequent vigil were attended by more than 1,000 people on 26 August, timed to coincide with a mass celebrated by Pope Francis in the Phoenix Park, Dublin, during his visit to Ireland. The names of the dead were read out and a sculpture in memory of the dead was unveiled.

Corless had been invited to attend a state reception for the pope by the office of the Taoiseach, Leo Varadkar, but she declined the invitation, saying: "I had to take a stand with the babies. We have asked the Church to meet with survivors and to talk to us about the babies in the sewage tank. We have asked the Bon Secours sisters to give us some record, to come to Tuam, to help the survivors; to talk to them. For the last four years none of the priests or the Archbishop of Tuam indeed would entertain us." In advance of the papal visit to Ireland, Corless wrote to the Vatican to ask that the pope meet one of the survivors of the Home. She stated that her request had not been answered.

In December 2018, the Sunday Independent published excerpts from a letter from Pope Francis replying to Zappone's letter, which it interpreted as putting pressure on religious orders to accept responsibility for the treatment of children who died in mother and baby homes. The Pope wrote: "I pray in particular that efforts made by the Government and by local churches and religious congregations will help face, responsibly, this tragic chapter in Ireland's history." No mention was made of additional reparations, as sought by the Minister. The Taoiseach described the response as "more of an acknowledgement than a substantive response."

== Irish Council for Civil Liberties call, August 2018 ==
On the 2018 International Day of the Disappeared (30 August), Liam Herrick, Director of the Irish Council for Civil Liberties, called for an investigation into the Bon Secours Home and related issues such as the Magdalene Laundries and forced and illegal adoptions, saying that Ireland had several questions to answer on enforced disappearances and on what happened to unmarried mothers and their children throughout the 20th century. He said: "When we look at Tuam, we're talking here about the obligations of the State to take all measures possible to identify the children who died in Tuam. And then to, where possible, return the remains to the families. We also are talking about a full public investigation into the circumstances of what happened at Tuam and steps being taken to guarantee that nothing of this nature could ever happen in another Irish institution in the future."

== Apology by Bon Secours Sisters ==
Following the release of the final report of the Mother and Baby Homes Commission of Investigation, the Bon Secours Sisters issued an apology in 2021. It stated:

The Commission's report presents a history of our country in which many women and children were rejected, silenced and excluded; in which they were subjected to hardship; and in which their inherent human dignity was disrespected, in life and in death.

Our Sisters of Bon Secours were part of this sorrowful history.

Our Sisters ran St Mary's Mother and Baby Home in Tuam from 1925 to 1961. We did not live up to our Christianity when running the Home. We failed to respect the inherent dignity of the women and children who came to the Home. We failed to offer them the compassion that they so badly needed. We were part of the system in which they suffered hardship, loneliness and terrible hurt. We acknowledge in particular that infants and children who died at the Home were buried in a disrespectful and unacceptable way. For all that, we are deeply sorry.

We offer our profound apologies to all the women and children of St Mary's Mother and Baby Home, to their families and to the people of this country.

Healing is not possible until what happened is acknowledged. We hope and we pray that healing will come to all those affected; those who are living and those who have died. We hope that we, our church and our country can learn from this history.

— Sr Eileen O'Connor, Area Leader, Sisters of Bon Secours Ireland

The order also committed to participating in a "Restorative Recognition Scheme" to be set up to compensate survivors.

== Forensic excavation and recovery efforts (2023–present) ==
Preparations for the Tuam site excavation began in June 2023 following the passage of the Institutional Burials Act 2022. The Office of the Director of Authorised Intervention at Tuam (ODAIT), established in March 2023 and led by Director Daniel MacSweeney since May of that same year, is the statutory body tasked with overseeing the recovery efforts. While no physical excavation took place in 2023, the site underwent surveys, legal planning, and logistical setup in anticipation of full recovery work. Excavation works formally began on 16 June 2025 with the establishment of forensic control and site setup. Full-scale forensic recovery efforts commenced on 14 July and are expected to take about two years, with the aim of recovering the remains of up to 796 infants and children believed to be buried in a disused underground septic tank, identifying them where possible through DNA analysis and forensic techniques, and providing them with a dignified reburial within a dedicated memorial garden at the site. The site is enclosed by a 2.4-metre-high hoarding and monitored continuously to preserve forensic integrity, with international experts from Colombia, Spain, the UK, Canada, and the United States joining Irish specialists in the recovery effort.

Up to September 2025, the excavation team initially focused on two areas of the site, the former workhouse yard and a 3 m (9.8 ft) part of the workhouse wall, where no burials were expected, before moving on to areas with known burials. On 4 October, the excavation team announced the discovery of five sets of skeletal remains dating to the period when the site was a workhouse, from 1841 to 1918. On 5 December, Daniel McSweeney announced that the team had discovered "consistent evidence" of a second burial ground, separate from that examined in 2017, and that 11 sets of infant remains had been recovered, all buried in coffins and all dating from 1925 to 1961, when the Home was operating. Catherine Corless described the find as a "huge milestone" and a vindication, saying: "Initially they were only finding artefacts on the site, and there are groups out there who are only jumping on that, saying the Home babies are not on the ground. They keep saying 'they are not there'. This is pure evidence now that they have dated the remains to the Mother and Baby Home. Hopefully this is the start of a process that will allow for DNA testing, to match babies with their families, so they can be brought home and laid to rest with their mothers."

On 6 February 2026, the ODAIT announced that a further 22 sets of human remains had been recovered, bringing the total to 33. The latest recoveries had been buried in coffins and dated to the period when the Mother and Baby Home was operating, while some of the earlier remains were dated to the workhouse. In April, the ODAIT announced that the total number of infant remains recovered had risen to 69. The additional bodies were recovered from a wider search area of the grounds than the original excavation and dated to the period of operation of the Mother and Baby Home. They had been buried in coffins, sometimes with several bodies in a single coffin, and the coffins had decayed since burial. The ODAIT also reported that more relatives of survivors had come forward for DNA testing. A further eight sets of infants' remains, in coffins, were recovered in May, along with individual bones belonging to both adults and children; these are being examined to determine their date. By July, a further 22 sets of infant remains, buried in coffins, were recovered, bringing the total to 99. None of the remains recovered so far are from the area of the memorial garden. In October, the ODAIT announced the recovery of a further 10 infant remains, bringing the total to 109.

== Grove Hospital ==
Following the revelations about the Home, in 2017, some Tuam residents called for an investigation into the town's Grove Hospital, which had also been run by the Bon Secours order. A number of people have claimed their children or siblings were buried on the site from the 1950s to the late 1970s, although the order denies that there was a graveyard there. Galway County Council has stipulated that an archaeologist must monitor excavation work on the site in order to preserve any remains which may be buried there.

== Film ==
The Lost Children of Tuam, a film produced by Liam Neeson and starring Monica Dolan as Catherine Corless, was released in 2026.

== See also ==
- Mother and Baby Homes Commission of Investigation - Commission established as a result of the revelations about the Bon Secours home.
- Bethany Mother and Child Home
- Cavan Orphanage Fire
- St Patrick's Mother and Baby Home
- Magdalene laundries in Ireland
- Canadian Indian residential school gravesites
- Philomena (film)
