= Cornashamsogue =

Townland in Connacht, Ireland

Coordinates: 54.0805°N 8.0256°W

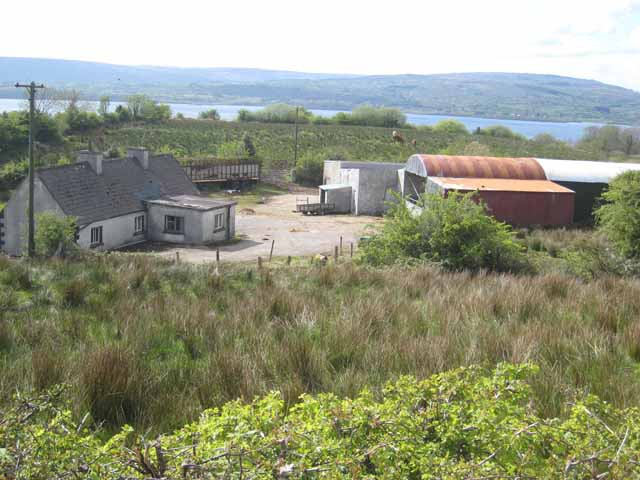
Farm in the eastern part of Cornashamsogue

Cornashamsogue is a small townland near Drumshanbo, County Leitrim, Ireland. It is located 10 minutes' drive north of Drumshanbo on the Dowra road. Its toponym derives from Cor na Seamsóg, which means "round hill of the wood-sorrel".

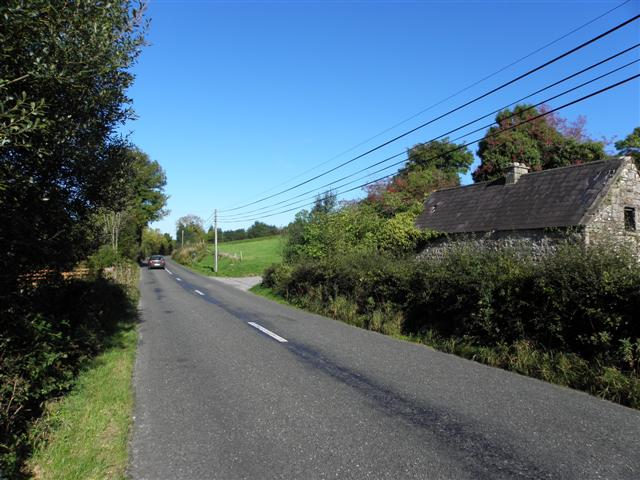
R207 road through Cornashamsogue

The R207 road passes through the western part of the townland roughly parallel to the eastern shore of Lough Allen, and a minor road through its eastern part, likewise in an approximate north-south direction. The latter is part of the Kingfisher Cycle Trail and the Leitrim Way.
