= Drumahaire (barony) =

Barony in County Leitrim, Ireland

Drumahaire Dhroim Dhá Thiar (Irish)
- Barony
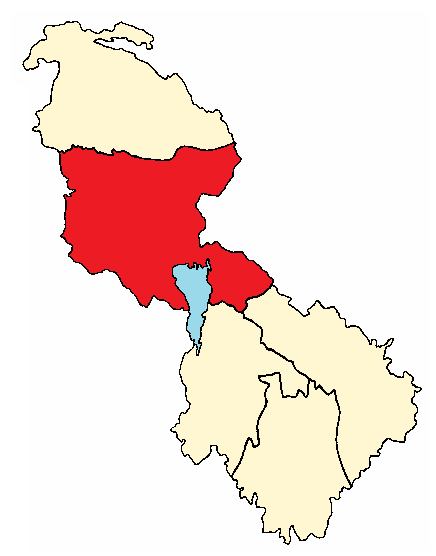
- Country: Ireland
- Province: Connacht
- County: Leitrim

Area
  - Total: 445.75 km^{2} (172.11 sq mi)

Drumahaire (Irish: Dhroim Dhá Thiar) is a barony in County Leitrim, Ireland.

== Etymology ==
Drumahaire barony takes its name from the village of Dromahair (Irish: Dhroim Dhá Thiar, "Two Demons Ridge"). The Irish thiar is a shortening of eithiar, a term that refers to a spirit of the air.

== Location ==
Drumahaire is found in central County Leitrim, stretching from the Dartry Mountains and Lough Gill to the Iron Mountains and Lough Allen.

The Barony of Drumahaire is bordered to the north by Rosclogher; to the southeast by Leitrim and Carrigallen (all the preceding baronies are also in County Leitrim); to the east by Tullyhaw, County Cavan; to the west by Carbury and Tirerril, County Sligo; and to the south by Boyle, County Roscommon.

== History ==
The Ó Ruairc (O'Rourke) were kings in this region for many centuries. O'Finn and O'Carroll were chiefs of Cálraighe, which included the civil parishes of Drumlease and Killargy. The MacKenny's (Keaney) were chiefs in an area known as Muinter Mountains, or Muintir-Kenny, an older name for the barony of Dromohair. Originally known as the Mac Consnamha, the Clan Kenny was said to originate in the parish of Innismagrath. They later were known as Mac Kinnawe and still later changed to Ford. The Mac Cagadháin (MacEgan?) were chief of Clan Fear a Muige here.

== List of settlements ==
Below is a list of settlements in Drumahaire barony:

- Ballinaglera
- Dowra (the County Leitrim side of the village)
- Dromahair
- Drumkeeran
- Fivemilebourne
- Glenfarne
- Manorhamilton
