= Irish flute =

Musical instrument

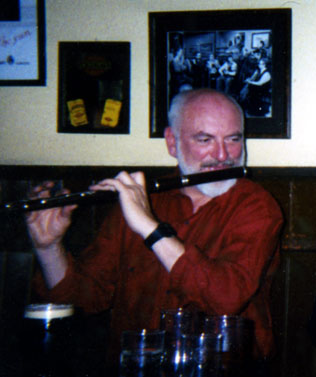
- Matt Molloy playing flute in Westport in March 2000
- Classification: Woodwind; Wind; Aerophone; Edge-blown aerophone
- Hornbostel–Sachs classification: 421.121.12 (open side-blown flute with fingerholes)

Playing range
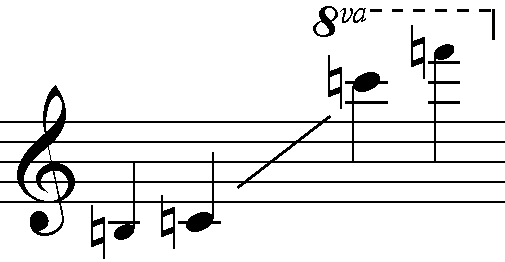
- (B3) C4–C7 (F7)

Related instruments
- Western concert flute

The Irish flute is a conical-bore, simple-system, wooden flute of the type favoured by classical flautists of the early 19th century, or to a flute of modern manufacture derived from this design (often with modifications to optimize its use in Irish Traditional Music, Scottish Traditional Music or Music of Brittany and other Celtic nations). The majority of traditional Irish flute players use a wooden, simple-system flute.

Although it is played in every county in Ireland, the flute has a strong heartland in the mid-western counties of Roscommon, Leitrim, Sligo, south Fermanagh, east Galway, Clare and west Limerick.

== Physical characteristics ==
A (keyless) wooden flute

The Irish flute is a simple system, transverse flute which plays a diatonic (Major) scale as the tone holes are successively covered and uncovered. Most flutes from the Classical era, and some of modern manufacture, include various metal keys or additional tone holes (such as a seventh, "pinky-hole", to access one lower note, typically the seventh degree of the scale) to achieve partial or complete chromatic tonality. Commonly added pads and keys, to play accidentals or various sharp or flat notes, may be added to any hole on the flute, though most commonly are given to the first, second, fourth, and fifth holes. For example, on a standard "D"-scale instrument, the addition of these extra keys would enable the player to achieve D♯/E♭, F♮, G♯/A♭, and A♯/B♭ notes with ease.

Due to its wooden construction, characteristic embouchure, and direct (keyless) fingering, the simple system flute has a distinctly different timbre from the Western concert flute, often sounding more "breathy" than the high and clear tones of classical silver flute. Most Irish flute players tend to strive for a dark and "reedy" tone, in comparison to classical flautists. Though most-commonly constructed in the key of "D"—similar to the whistle, and most traditional music played in unison is in the D, G or A-Major key signatures—, simple-system flutes are available pitched in other keys, and may be manufactured upon the orderer's request, such as in E/E♭, B/B♭, or C/C♯, amongst other keys. Although referred to as a "D flute", this is a non-transposing instrument, and "D" merely refers to the lowest note on a standard instrument tuned to D-Major, typically; if one were to play a "C", a concert-pitch "C" is sounded. Any flute built and tuned to E♭, B♭ or C are transposing instruments.

The flute has six main finger-holes. For a D flute (the most common variety), with "X" symbolizing a covered finger-hole and O symbolizing an uncovered finger-hole, all holes covered, (three fingers per hand) can be represented as XXX-XXX = D . As the scale progresses, XXX-XXO = E, XXX-XOO = F♯, XXX-OOO = G, XXO-OOO = A, XOO-OOO = B, OOO-OOO = C♯, with XXX-XXX or OXX-XXX being the higher octave D for the full D major scale.

Wooden flutes have a cylindrical bore in the head and a conical bore in the body. This bore is largest at the head end, tapering down to a smaller bore at the foot. This has the effect of shortening the flute for a given pitch.

There is some confusion with modern players in that a modern Boehm keyed system flute is typically pitched in C. This is due to the added keys that allow one to reach low C, yet when one covers just the six main finger-holes (with thumb key covered) on a modern metal Boehm system flute, (XXX-XXX) the note achieved is D. For many technical reasons, a simple system D wooden flute more closely mirrors a concert C modern Boehm system flute in the pitches achieved in its fingering positions as opposed to a simple system flute pitched in C. Theobald Boehm completely redesigned the flute to more easily access the chromatic scale. The Boehm flute has a cylindrical bore (with a parabolic bore in the head) and uses keys to enable the tone holes to be in the ideal place and to be of the ideal size.

== Historical developments ==
Despite the implication of this commonly used name, the Irish flute is not an instrument indigenous to Ireland. The simple system, conical-bore flute is what people played before the advent of the modern, Boehm system, Western concert flute in the mid-19th century. Simple-system flutes are usually made of wood (cocus, grenadilla (African blackwood), rosewood, ebony, etc.). There were several manufacturers of this type of flute, among whom was English inventor and flautist Charles Nicholson Jr, who developed a radically improved version of the transverse wooden flute.

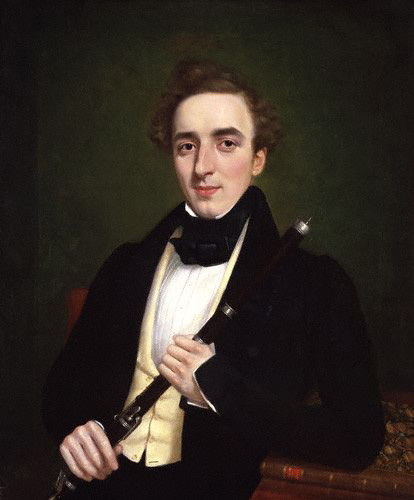
Charles Nicholson with flute, 1834 portrait

From the latter part of the 19th century, there were two main styles of large-holed flutes made by two London-based companies: Rudall & Rose and later Boosey & Co., which produced the Pratten flute devised by Robert Sidney Pratten, a prominent flautist of the 1840s and 1850s. George Rudall was an amateur player of some importance who studied for a time under the junior Nicholson before teaching on his own. He was introduced to John Mitchell Rose in c.1820 and their long association began. The Pratten has wider bore dimensions and provides a bigger sound. The Rudall & Rose flutes had a reputation for having a darker, purer tone and slightly thinner than the Pratten style flute, but the firm made flutes of many styles, primarily in cocus wood and boxwood. Many of these original flutes had a foot joint that allowed the playing of both C# and C with the use of keys, typically pewter plugs that fit into silver plates. Some modern makers forgo the addition of these keys, but maintain the longer footjoint with two holes where the keys would be, as it is thought to better emulate the pitching and tone of the 19th century originals.

Simple system flutes were not made with traditional folk musicians in mind, but were adapted by amateur flautists as the simple wooden flutes were discarded by concert musicians. Belfast-born flute-maker Samuel Colin Hamilton is of the opinion that military flute and fife bands, which were widespread in Ireland in the 19th century, played a role in familiarising Irish society with the flute as an instrument that could be used in dance music. Also, an upturn in the economic conditions in Ireland from the middle of the 19th century meant that more people were able to acquire instruments.

== Modern variations and flute makers ==
Today, transverse "simple system Irish" flutes are being made for the playing of a variety of traditional musical styles. In the Irish tradition, the material used is most commonly wood, but also Delrin, PVC, and even bamboo is used – though wood is still by far the most popular material. These modern Irish flutes can vary in the number of added metal keys, or have no keys at all. Most are tuned using modern methods and are typically better in tune with modern instruments. All have the basic six hole diatonic design as in a tinwhistle.

Today's makers emulate the designs of old, focusing often on a specific model or serial number, and maintaining tuning to today's modern pitch standard of A=440 at equal temperament. The flutes of Rudall & Rose and Pratten were made in the meantone temperament, though some were created in equal temperament.

Some modern "Irish" wooden flute makers include:

- Eamonn Cotter - based in County Clare.
- Martin Doyle - based near Liscannor, in the County Clare.
- Hammy Hamilton - based in Cúil Aodha, West Cork.
- Terry McGee - based in Australia.

== Playing technique ==
The modern playing technique within the Irish Traditional Music has much in common with tin whistle technique. This involves using a number of ornaments to embellish the music, including cuts, strikes and rolls. Common ornaments and articulations include:

Cut and strike (or tap, or pat)
Cut and strike "Cut" is rapidly lifting and putting down a finger; "Strike" is rapidly hitting and lifting an open hole with a finger.
Rolls
A roll is a note with first a cut and then a strike. Alternatively, a roll can be considered as a group of notes of identical pitch and duration with different articulations.
Cranns
Cranns (or crans) are ornaments borrowed from the Uilleann piping tradition. They are similar to rolls except that only cuts are used, not taps or strikes.

== Regional styles and players ==
The flute is associated with several regions and distinct styles of playing in Ireland.

=== Roscommon - Sligo style ===
This style is in general quite fast flowing, and ornamented. A good exponent of the Sligo style is Matt Molloy, (Ballahaderreen, County Roscommon). Other players include Eddie Cahill (born 1929 in Ballyglass, Tobercurry), John Joe Gardiner (1893-1979) who came from near Ballymote, County Sligo, Carmel Gunning, Kevin Henry, Peter Horan, Paddy Hunt, Mick Loftus, June McCormack (won the Senior All-Ireland flute title in 1998), Josie McDermott, McDonagh brothers of Ballinafad, Sonny McDonagh, James Murray (South Sligo), Colm O'Donnell (from Kilmactigue), Seamus O'Donnell, Michael J. Ryan, Roger Sherlock, Séamus Tansey.

=== Roscommon - Style ===
Matt Molloy (from Ballaghaderreen), Patsy Hanly (Killrooskey, all-Ireland winner on flute in 1972), John P. Carty (from Knockroe, Ballinameen), Bernard Flaherty (from Boyle, author of Trip to Sligo, a book about the region's music), John Wynne (from Kilteevan, brought up in Roscommon town), Catherine McEvoy (who has released several CDs in this style of music), Peg McGrath from Corrigeenroe (a founder member of the Táin Ceili Band, all-Ireland champions on several occasions), Frank Jordan (of Buckhill, Fairymount, played with the Birmingham Ceili Band and the Woodlands Ceili Band), Tommy Guihan (won the Senior All-Ireland flute title in 1978), Patsy McNamara (from the village of Croghan in North Roscommon), John Kelly (of Roscommon town), John Carlos (from Castleplunkett, played with the Killina Ceili Band), Pat Finn (from Fairymount, played with the Liverpool Ceili Band before returning to Ireland), Brian Duke (from Strokestown, recorded two albums and also toured with the bands Cian and Electric Ceili).

=== Leitrim and Northern style ===
Though beside the Sligo area, and overshadowed to some extent by the rich musical tradition of its neighbour, Leitrim preserved a separate identity and tradition based largely on the flute. The Leitrim style is highly rhythmic, less ornamented, and with much use of glottal stops and even tonguing, as in the music of John McKenna. McKenna, from Tarmon, midway between Drumkeeran and Drumshanbo, is regarded as one of the most influential flute players in the history of Irish music. Local flute players from whom McKenna is known to have learned music were Hughie Byrne and Jamesy McManus. Other Drumkeeran players at the time were John Frank Doherty and Francie Rourke.

Contemporary players associated with this style are: Desy Adams (with Na Dórsa), Harry Bradley, Michael Clarkson, Packie Duignan, Gary Hastings, Deidre Havlin (with Déanta), The Innisfree Ceili Band, Mick Mulvey (from Carrick-on-Shannon), Conal Ó Gráda and Desi Wilkinson.

=== Fermanagh style ===
This style "seems to perch geographically and musically between the plainer and more uniform approach of North-East Ulster and the more florid ornamentation characteristic of counties Sligo and Leitrim." It is exemplified by the playing of the late Eddie Duffy, who was influenced by William Carroll and Laurence Nugent, from Lack, County Fermanagh. Cathal McConnell, flutist with Boys of the Lough, took the region's music to a world-wide audience.

James McMahon (1893-1977) was a Fermanagh-born flutist and composer who settled in Belfast. He played an ivory flute and among his compositions was a jig called "The Ivory Flute", still played today. He also composed the ever-popular reel "The Banshee". He played with fellow Fermanagh musicians Fergus McTaggart (fiddle), Sean McAloon (pipes) and Tommy Maguire (accordion, father of flutist Peter Maguire). Recordings of his playing have been collected by flutist Sharon Creasey; a collection of his Fermanagh tunes was made by Liam Donnelly, from which several were selected for inclusion in Ceol Rince na hÉireann Vol. 4.

John Joe Maguire (born 1928) hailed from Kinawley, County Fermanagh. He was one of a few flute players who helped keep the music alive in the area during the 1940s and 1950s before it enjoyed a renaissance from the 1960s onwards. The John Joe Maguire Memorial Weekend is held every year in Swanlinbar in his honour.

Flute and tin-whistle player Laurence ("Larry") Nugent has based himself in Chicago since 1992 and has recorded several albums of traditional music. He comes from the little village of Lack, where his father Sean Nugent has been the leader of the Pride of Erin Ceili Band.

=== East Galway style ===
The East Galway style is more relaxed in tempo, and quite flowing. Paddy Carty played in this style, others include Mike Rafferty (from Ballinakill, County Galway, winner of the 2010 National Heritage Fellowship Award), Jim Conroy, Jack Coen, the Moloney family (Seán Moloney, his father Eddie, his son Stephen) also from Ballinakill, County Galway and Tom Morrison (1889-1958) from Dunmore, County Galway. The Ballinakill Ceilidh Band was formed in 1927 and included, as well as Stephen and Jerry Moloney, the influential flute-player Tom Whelan (after whom a number of popular tunes are named).

Vincent Broderick (1920 - 7 August 2008) was an exponent of this style. In 1953 he won the All-Ireland flute competition performing one of his own compositions.

=== Clare style ===
There are several stylistic subdivisions in County Clare. Micho Queally (great-grandfather of Michael Hynes) from Kilfenora was a well-known flute player in the 19th century. Notable flautists from the county include the Russell brothers, Kevin Crawford, Jim Ward and Paddy McMahon (long-time members of the Kilfenora Céilí Band), Peadar O'Loughlin, Paddy O'Donoghue, Eamonn Cotter, PJ Crotty, Michael, Séamus and P J Hynes (West Clare style) and Garry Shannon. Flutists with the Tulla Céilí Band included J.J. Conway (from Kilfenora), Seamus Cooley, Jim Donoghue, Paddy Donoghue, Michael Falsey, Jenifer Lenihan, Peter O'Loughlin, Jack Murphy, Michael Preston, J.C. Talty and Martin Talty.

== Other notable players of the Irish flute ==
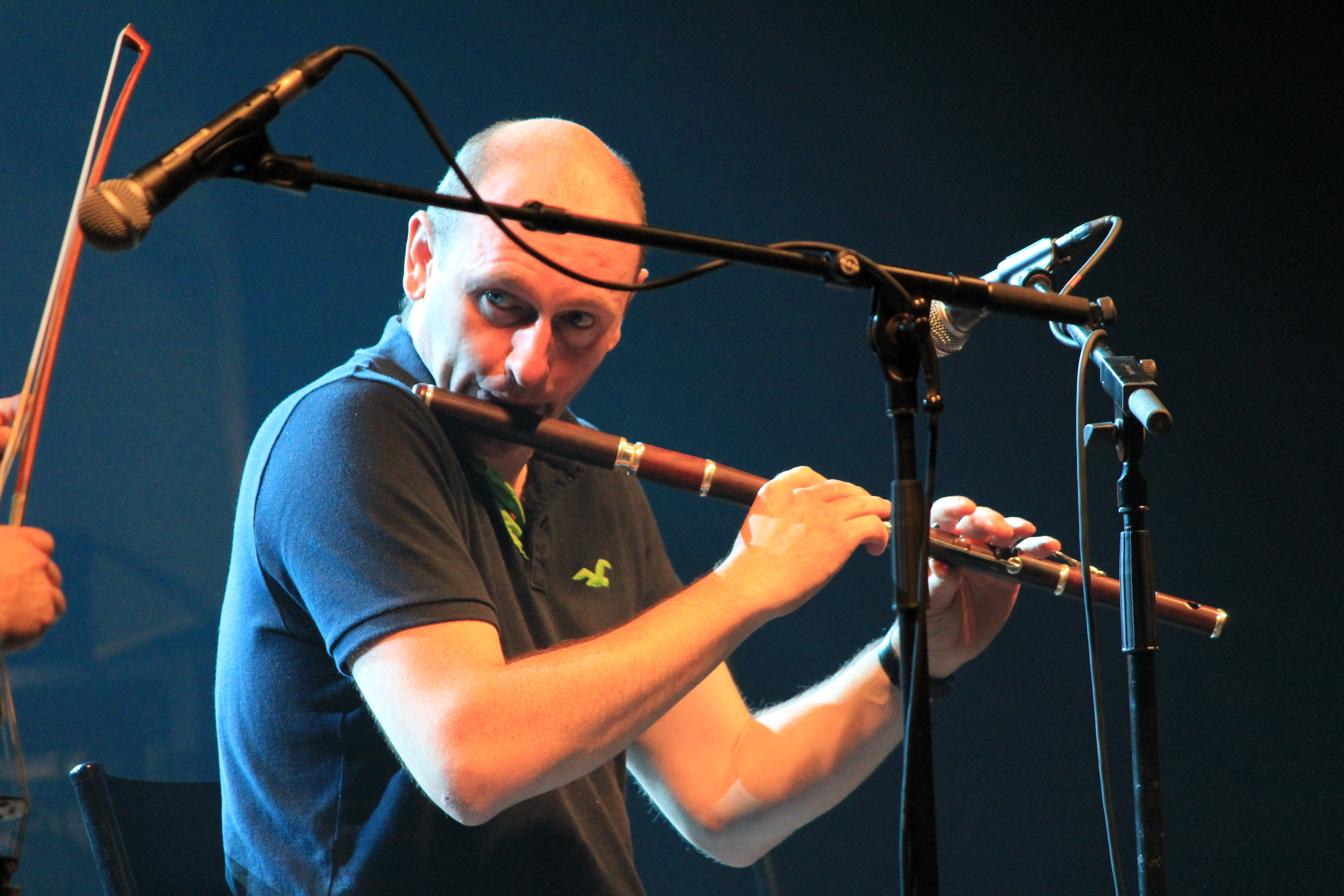
Michael McGoldrick in Lorient in 2013.

Some other players of Irish traditional music on the flute include the following:

- Billy Clifford (whose family hailed from Sliabh Luachra) played in the Star of Munster trio with his mother Julia Clifford. He made several recordings with her and his father John Clifford.
- Ciara Considine
- Tara Diamond (from County Down) and her father Leslie Bingham
- Paul McGlinchey, from Omagh, County Tyrone.
- Tom Doorley (from Glenageary, County Dublin; performed with Danú)
- Seamus Egan
- Brian Finnegan
- Steph Geremia
- Oliver Goldsmith
- Aoife Granville (traditional flute tutor in UCC's School of Music and Theatre)
- Skip Healy (from Rhode Island, also a manufacturer)
- Neansaí Ní Choisdealbha, Music Editor with RTÉ Raidió na Gaeltachta and presenter/producer of its main Irish Traditional Music programme "Ceol Binn ó na Beanna"
- Frankie Kennedy concentrated mainly on Donegal music
- Paul McGrattan from the northside of Dublin
- Seosamh Mac Grianna (known locally as Joe Mhici Jimi) from Rann na Feirste, a small rural peninsula in the Rosses, near Gweedore in the County Donegal Gaeltacht.
- Séamas Mac Mathúna (from Gower, Cooraclare, County Clare, worked full-time for Comhaltas Ceoltóirí Éireann)
- Joanie Madden
- Pat O'Donnell from Limerick; now living in Galway
- Michael McGoldrick
- Tom McHale was a whistle and flute player from Tulsk, County Roscommon, who lived for some years in Birmingham.
- Louise Mulcahy from Limerick. Female Musician of the Year in the LiveIreland Music Awards 2015.
- Caoimhín Ó Fearghail, from An Rinn in the west Waterford Gaeltacht. TG4 Young Traditional Musician of the Year in 2012.
- Chris Norman (flautist)
- Francis O'Neill
- John Skelton, born in London, played with the Irish group Shegui and later with The House Band
- Calum Stewart
- Paddy Taylor (1914-1976) from County Limerick, who played a Radcliff-system flute, was a central figure on the London scene in the 1940s.
- Michael Tubridy

== Recordings ==
- Josie McDermott: Darby's Farewell LP issued on Topic in 1977. Reissued on CD in 2000.
- Peg McGrath on flute accompanied by Kathleen Smyth on fiddle and Mary Mulholland on piano (1981). Cherish the Ladies. Belfast: Outlet solp 1043.
- Séamus Tansey: Traditional Irish Music AKA The Best of Séamus Tansey recorded in 1971 in Belfast with Josie Keegan on piano.

== Bibliography ==
- Breathnach, Breandán: Folk Music and Dances of Ireland (1971) ISBN 1-900428-65-2
- Gearóid Ó hAllmhuráin (1998). A Pocket History of Irish Traditional Music. Dublin: O'Brien Press.
- The Flute and its Patrons, Chapter XXVII of Francis O'Neill's Irish Minstrels and Musicians.
- Taylor, Barry (2013). Music in a Breeze of Wing; Traditional Dance Music in West-Clare 1870-1970. Danganella: Barry Taylor. ISBN 978-0-9927356-0-9.
