= John McKenna (flautist) =

Irish and American musician

John McKenna (January 6, 1880 – November 26, 1947) was an Irish-American musician originally from Tents, Tarmon, County Leitrim, midway between Drumkeeran and Drumshanbo. The area is a scenic mountainous area overlooking Lough Allen and the surrounding countryside.

== Life and music ==
As a young man McKenna worked in the Arigna Collieries. He married local nurse Mary Jane Keaveney on 13 September 1909 in Brigid's Church, Drumkeeran. The young couple emigrated to America following their marriage and settled in New York, having arrived on 3 October 1909. The couple went on to have nine children, six of whom survived. John McKenna took up employment with the New York City Fire Department in July 1920, but after the premature death of his wife, McKenna left his employment in 1926 to care for his young family.

McKenna's recording career spanned from 1921 to 1937. He recorded with New Republic, O'Byrne De Witt, Columbia and Decca Records, amongst others. John McKenna was responsible for reintroducing Leitrim tunes such as "Lucky in Love", "The Sailor and the Rock" and the "Happy Days of Youth". His legacy of recordings made him one of the most influential flute players in Irish traditional music – he has influenced De Dannan, Frankie Gavin and Matt Molloy.

John McKenna is buried at Calvary Cemetery, Hawthorne, New York.

A monument to McKenna's music legacy was erected in Tarmon in 1980. Shortly afterwards the John McKenna Music Festival was instituted, which takes place every year in Drumkeeran.

== Recordings ==
In 2014 a "definitive" 2-CD collection of McKenna's recordings, re-mastered by Harry Bradshaw, which includes an illustrated book containing a full account of his life and times, was released by The John McKenna Society.

== See also ==
- Irish flute
