= Simple system flute =

Classical flute

The term simple system flute refers to the type of flute manufactured and favored by classical European musicians during the Classical era, before the development of the Boehm system flute. These flutes are based on the Baroque traverso, a lineage that also gave rise to the traditional Irish flute, and to the flutes used in Cuban charanga bands. For this reason, the term is commonly used to distinguish "traditional" Irish flutes from the modern Boehm-system flute.

== Physical characteristics ==
The simple system flute had a cylindrical head joint and a reverse tapered body. The six main tone holes were heavily undercut to produce even intonation and registration while providing even finger spacing. French simple system flutes (or "five-key flutes") from this era typically had five keys that enabled the flute to play in any key. English and German models were typically designed with eight keys: the five of the five-key flute, plus an alternate F key running along the instrument, and two keys on the foot joint to extend the lower register down to middle C.

== Related links ==
Charles Nicholson (flautist)
