= Ballinaglera =

Village in County Leitrim, Ireland

Ballinaglera Baile na gCléireach
- Village
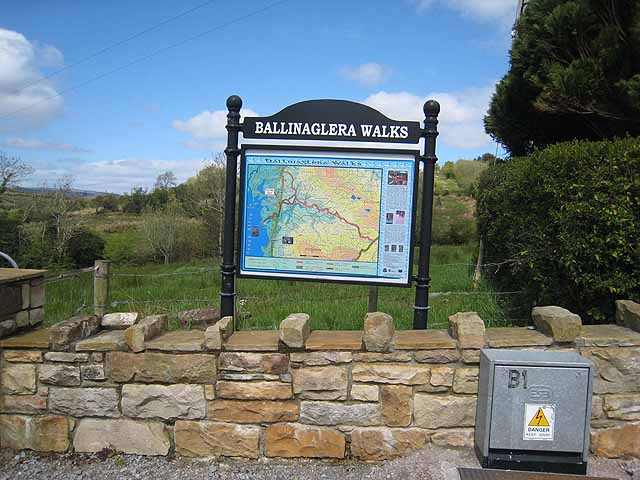
- Ballinaglera walking trail signage

- Location in Ireland
- Coordinates: 54°09′20″N 8°00′31″W
- Country: Ireland
- Province: Connacht
- County: County Leitrim
- Barony: Drumahaire

Ballinaglera, officially Ballinagleragh (Irish: Baile na gCléireach, meaning 'town of the clergy'), is a village in County Leitrim. It is on the R207 regional road, the village being very close to the north-eastern shores of Lough Allen.

== Sport ==
Ballinaglera GAA is the local GAA club.

== See also ==
- List of towns and villages in the Republic of Ireland
