= Michael Rafferty =

Michael Rafferty may refer to:

- Michael R. Rafferty, US editor and mayor
- Mike Rafferty (flautist), Irish musician
- Michael Thomas Rafferty, convicted of the murder of Tori Stafford
- Michael Rafferty, main character in the TV series Rafferty's Rules

== See also ==
- Mike Rafferty, a former member of the band Brand New Sin
