= Mary McPartlan =

Irish singer and producer (1955–2020)

- Born: 8 January 1955; Drumkeeran
- Died: 6 April 2020 (aged 65); Galway
- Education: Lehman College, City University of New York
- Known for: Traditional Irish music
- Spouse: Paddy Noonan
- Children: Mairéad, Meabh, Niamh, and David

Mary McPartlan (8 January 1955 – 6 April 2020) was a traditional Irish singer and musician as well as a music director and producer.

== Biography ==
Mary McPartlan was born in 1955 in Drumkeeran, County Leitrim. She founded folk duo Calypso in the 1970s. McPartlan was also the founder of both the Galway singers club An Riabhóg and theatre company Skehana. She was also the administrator of Galway Youth Theatre.

McPartlan worked as a lecturer for University College, Galway (UCG; now the University of Galway). She received a Fulbright Scholarship to Lehman College in the City University of New York in 2013. She taught Creative Arts and Theatre. McPartlan also worked as an arts PR and consultant with her own company Mac P.

During the 1990s, McPartlan worked with TG4 to develop the Traditional Irish Music awards, Gradam Ceoil. She worked as a producer and director of musical projects including TG4 music show Flosc, the Arts in Action programme at NUI Galway and the opening of Glór, the national Irish music centre in Ennis, County Clare. McPartlan toured with the Druid Theatre's Seán Tyrell productions of The Midnight Court.

In 2004, McPartlan released her debut album The Holland Handkerchief and followed it in 2008 with Petticoat Loose and then in 2016 with From Mountain To Mountain. She was awarded the Ireland United States Association (IUSA) Distinguished Alumni Award for her contribution to culture, education and music.

McPartlan was married to Paddy Noonan, with whom she had two daughters, Mairéad and Meabh. She was also stepmother to Niamh and David. She died on 6 April 2020 after a long cancer illness.
