= Sliabh an Iarainn =

Hill in County Leitrim, Ireland

- Slieve Anierin, Slievanierin
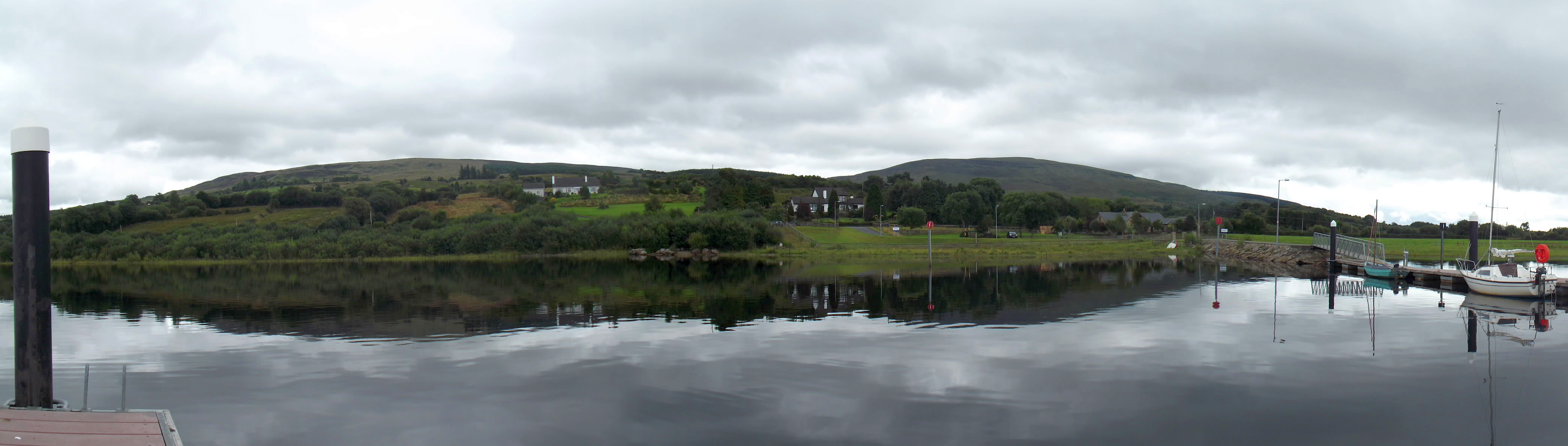
- Sliabh an Iarainn (right) viewed from Lough Allen

Highest point
- Elevation: 585 m (1,919 ft)
- Prominence: 245 m (804 ft)
- Listing: Marilyn
- Coordinates: 54°5′33.35″N 7°58′19.56″W

Naming
- English translation: Mountain of the iron
- Language of name: Irish

Geography
- Location within island of Ireland
- Location: County Leitrim, Ireland

Climbing
- Easiest route: Hike

Sliabh an Iarainn (Irish for "iron mountain"), anglicized Slieve Anierin, is a mountain in County Leitrim, Ireland. It rises to 585 metres (1,919 ft) and lies east of Lough Allen and northeast of Drumshanbo. It is part of the Cuilcagh Mountains. The mountain was shaped by the southwestward movement of ice age glaciers over millions of years, the morainic drift heaping thousands of drumlins in the surrounding lowlands. Historically there were many iron ore deposits and ironworks in the area. Irish mythology associates the mountain with the Tuatha Dé Danann, particularly the smith god Goibniu. Sliabh an Iarainn is an important natural heritage site with exposed marine and coastal fauna of paleontological interest

== Etymology ==
The name Sliabh an Iarainn means "mountain or moor of the iron" and refers to the many iron ore deposits in the area. Boate (1652) said "the mountains are so full of this metal, that hereof it hath got in Irish the name of Slew Neren, that is, Mountains of Iron". It is sometimes anglicized 'Slieve Anierin' or 'Slievanierin'.

The mountain was anciently named Sliab Comaicne, or the "mountain of the Conmaicne Rein in Connacht".

== Natural heritage site ==
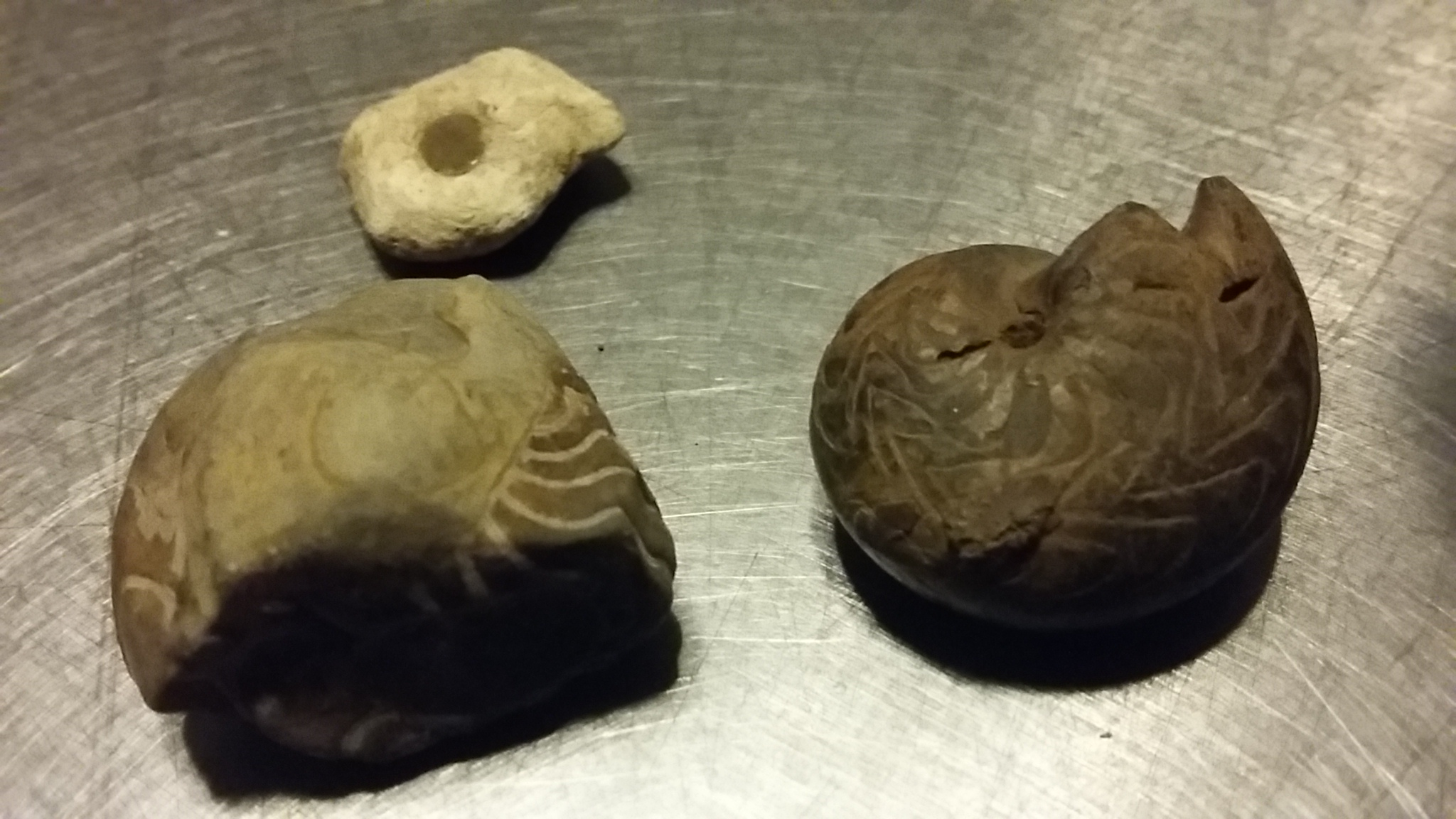
Goniatite Fossils at the shores of Lough Allen (Slieve Anierin)

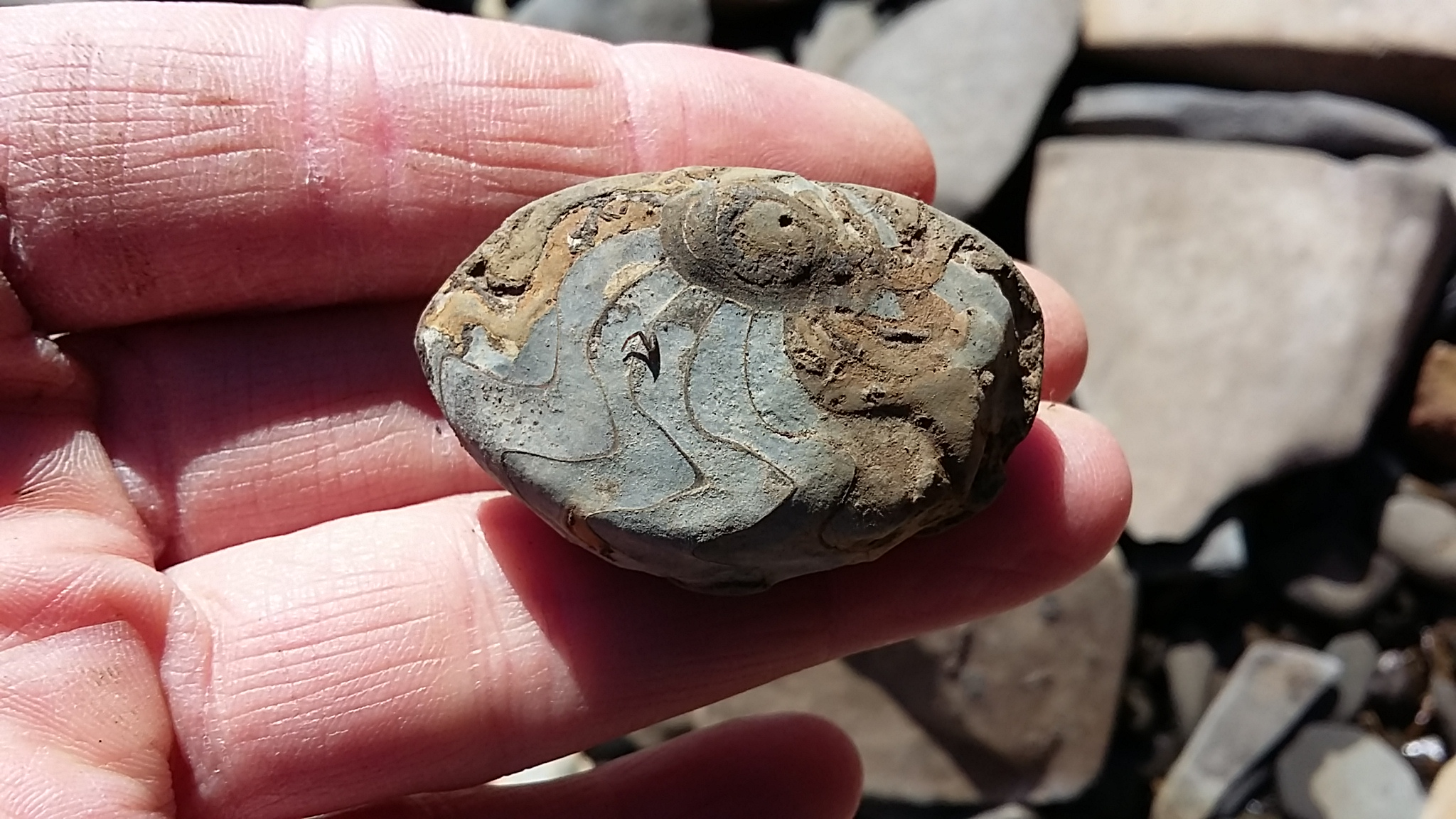
Goniatite Fossils Found on the Shores of Lough Allen

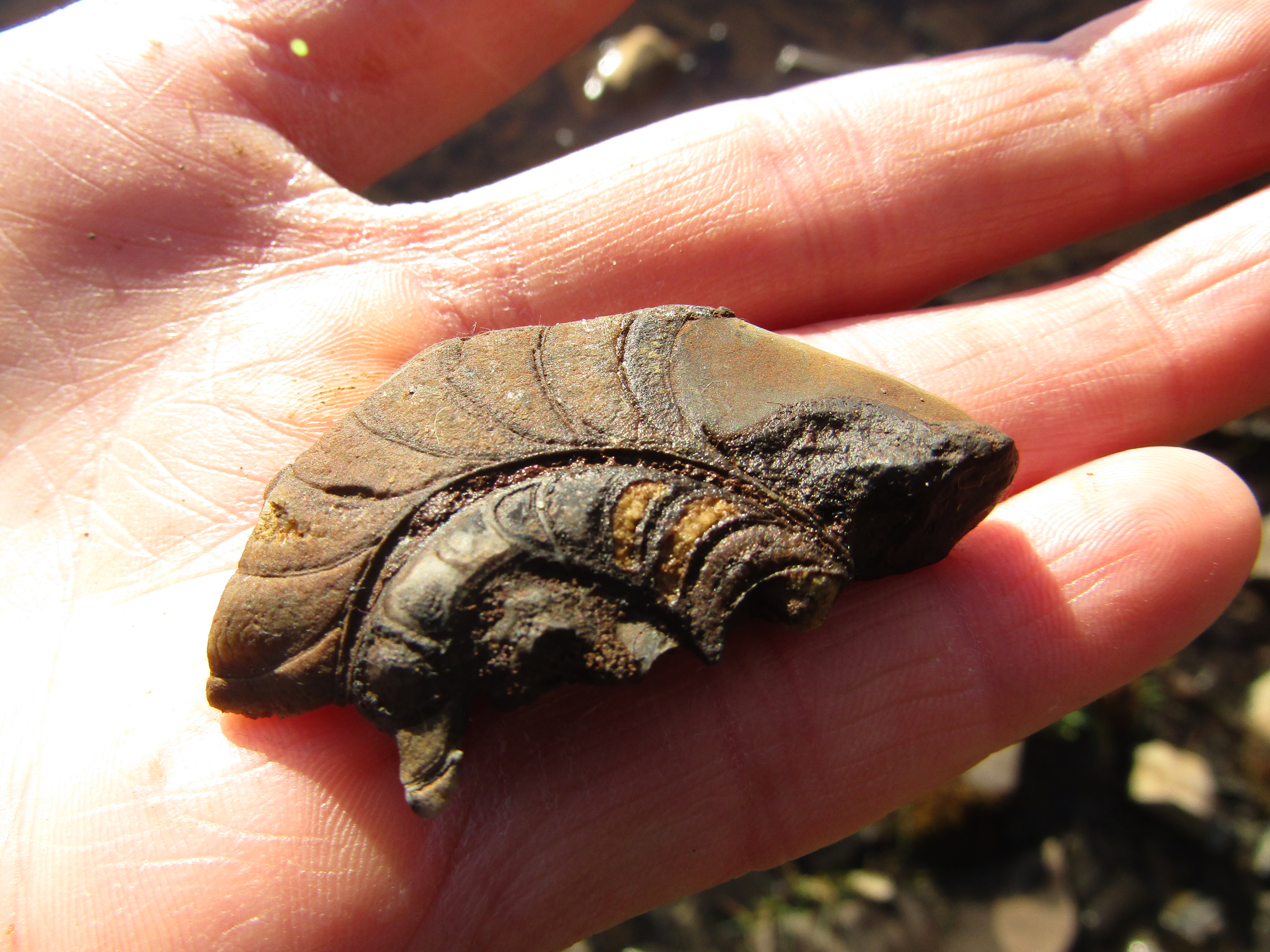
Natural Ireland.Fossils Found on Lough Allen

Sliabh an Iarainn is an important natural heritage site due to unbroken sequence of Carboniferous marine fossils present in the rock layers spanning the Namurian (326-315 million years ago) and lower Westphalian (313-304 million years ago) stages of the Silesian (series). The Geological survey of Ireland (1878) wrote "the Geologist may examine all the formations of the district from the Lower Silurian up to the outlier of Coal-measures that crowns Slieve-an-Ierin… It is a rare thing in most countries to find so much comprised in so small a space".

In her landmark study "The Palaeontology of the Namurian rocks of Slieve Anierin, Co. Leitrim, Eire", Patricia Yates (1962) demonstrated a "remarkable extent" of Namurian marine fauna bands, abundant with goniatite-Bivalvia, at Sliabh an Iarainn. (Note: "Miss Yates died on 7 August 1960 at the early age of twenty-eight, only five days before the examination of a thesis she had prepared for the Ph.D degree of the University of London. Since this work is a major contribution to Carboniferous stratigraphical palaeontology, it has been edited for publication by Dr. W. H. C. Ramsbottom and Dr. Gwyn Thomas".) She described some rock layers as particularly fossiliferous, the shale bands abundant with goniatite faunas and Bivalvia marine and freshwater molluscs. The unfossiliferous shales often contain numerous clay-ironstone bands making conditions intolerable for marine organisms. At most of the fossiliferous levels in the Namurian beds the number of goniatites and Bivalvia are usually very high with the diversity of species low. The richest and most diverse band in the succession at Sliabh an Iarainn, in terms of species present, contains Trilobites, brachiopods, gastropods, echinoids and Bryozoa. Fragments of trilobites occur abundantly at particular bands. Overall, Yates documented nearly 120 distinct fossiliferous sites around Sliabh an Iarainn, her work complemented by extensive photographs of often beautifully preserved fossils. Her study of Sliabh an Iarainn is considered important, being housed at the Murchison Museum, Imperial College, British Geological Survey Museum, and the Natural Museum in London.

== Geography ==
Sliabh an Iarainn is an imposing hill, towering over and dominating the rugged landscape. It rises from the eastern shore of Lough Allen to a summit elevation of 586-metre (1,923 ft). On this summit at 520 metres (1,706.0 ft), a Triangulation station of the Ordnance Survey is fixed on a low concrete plinth. It is part of the Cuilcagh Mountains, which stretch from Sliabh an Iarainn to Cuilcagh.

=== Geology ===
Sliabh an Iarainn is composed of Carboniferous shales, and sandstones blanketed by heather-covered moorland, and located in an area of Upper Carboniferous rocks extending from the northern extremity of Lough Erne for about 48 kilometres (29.8 mi) to the southern tip of Lough Allen. Shale is the dominant rock type throughout the Carboniferous succession, but a thick grit, with coal seams, occurs in the lower rock layers of 326-315 million years ago. At its greatest width the outcrop stretches eastwards towards Swanlinbar 32 kilometres (19.9 mi) distant. The outcrop narrows northwards, interrupted by a deep shoreline indentation of Carboniferous Limestone around the Belcoo area, to the north of which it widens before rapidly narrowing towards Lough Erne.

Sliabh an Iarainn, at the southern end of this mass, and east of Lough Allen, is a flat topped mountain with a prominent and steep grit slope, easily mistaken for the summit from a distance, when in fact another 50 metres (164.0 ft) of shales form a small residual outlier overlying this grit. There is a thick obscuring mantle of peat bog and glacial drift below the steep grit slope, with heather and peat bog forming a thick mantle over most of the upland plateau at the summit. Rocks are typically horizontal or gently dipping, except in land-slipped areas. Impressive landslides have occurred along the western face, and at the south-western and south-eastern corners of the mountain, indicating an appreciative magnitude of land-slipping.

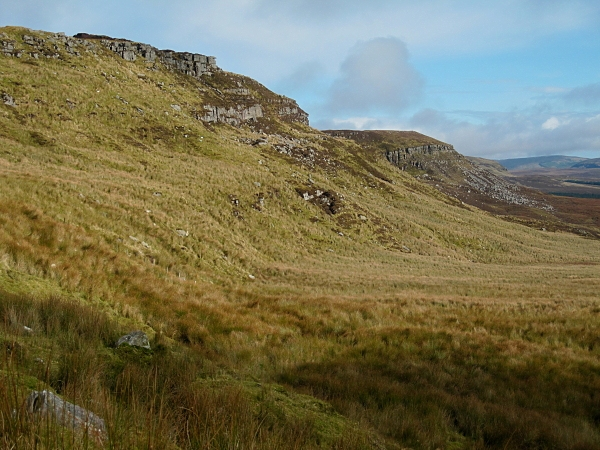
Sliabh an Iarainn Escarpment

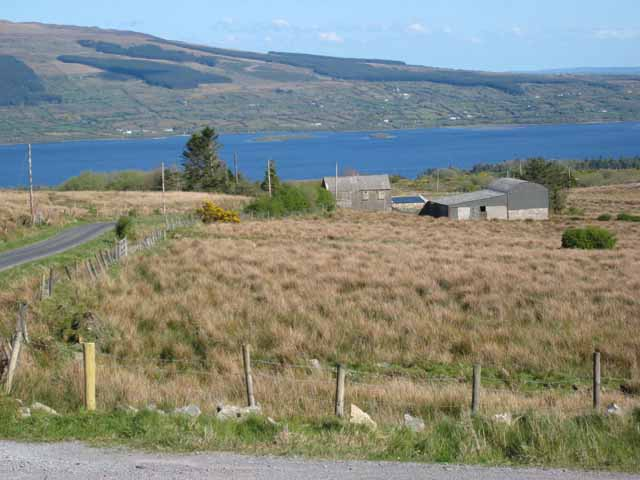
Hillside above Timpaun

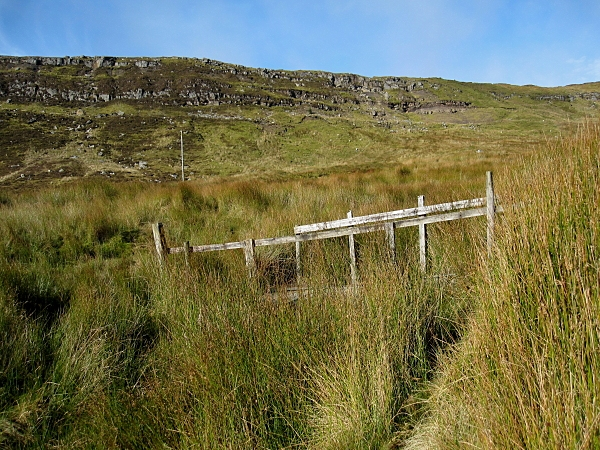
Footbridge and Cliffs

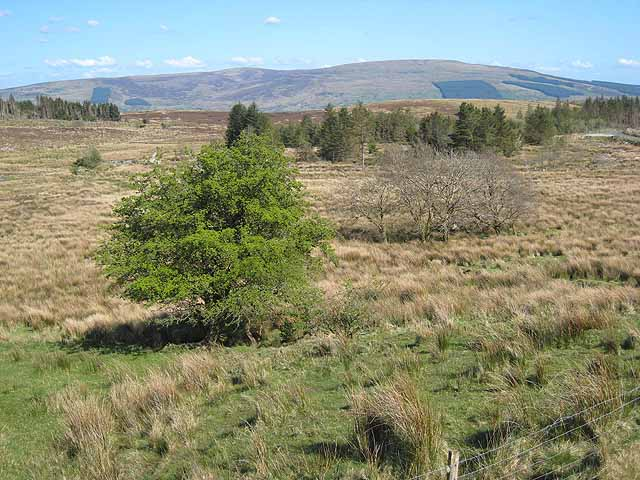
Moorland and scattered trees at Ardlougher

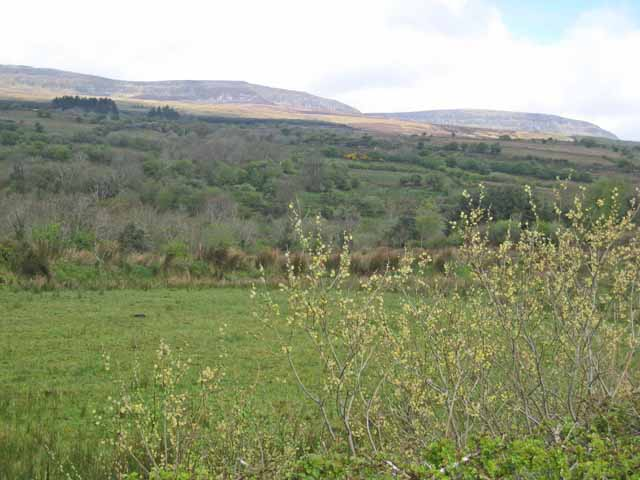
South-eastern flanks of Sliabh an Iarainn

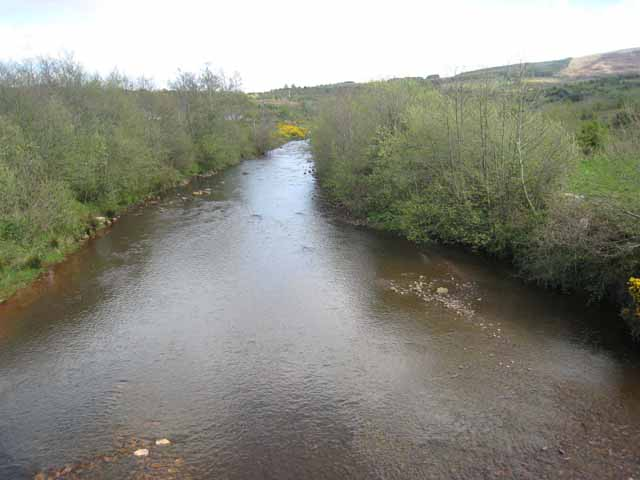
The Yellow River

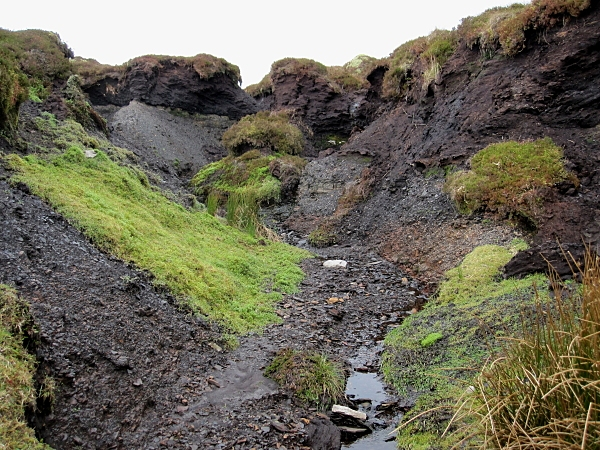
Channel eroded in the peat close to summit

=== Stratigraphy ===
The geological section from Lough Allen across Sliabh an Iarainn has the following general succession of strata-

- Yoredale Beds or Namurian base. (Note: Yates states "The term Yoredale is not particularly well chosen for these beds as goniatites are rare in those deposits. The shales on Slieve Anierin are in no way comparable with such a succession".)
  - Coarse grits. 9 metres (29.5 ft)
  - Shales, limestones, and flags. 16.4 metres (53.8 ft)
  - Shales with ironstone modules 241 metres (790.7 ft)

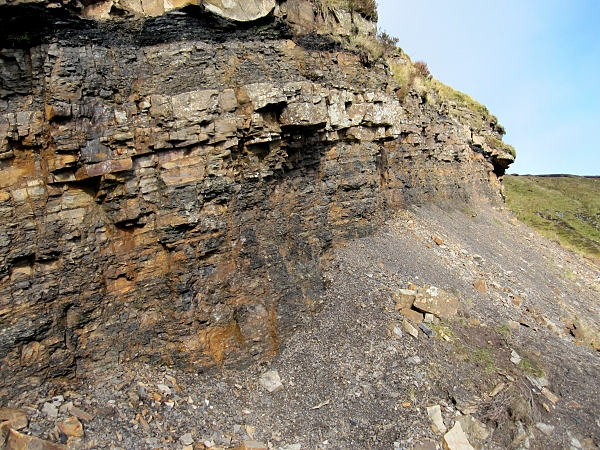
Mining operations; a seam of coal can be seen at the top edge

- Millstone Grit:
  - Crow coal with shale layers. 1.2 metres (3 ft 11.2 in)
  - Flag Grits 2.4 metres (7 ft 10.5 in)
  - Shales 500 metres (1,640.4 ft)
  - Coarse grits 11 metres (36.1 ft)
  - Coal seat, with plant remains 500 metres (1,640.4 ft)
  - Middle coal 0.3 metres (11.8 in)
  - Shales 3.7 metres (12.1 ft)
  - Coarse grits and flagstones 23 metres (75.5 ft)
- Lower coal measures:
  - Shales with marine fossils 228 metres (748.0 ft)

The so-called "Yoredale beds" extend down to the edge of Lough Allen on the west, and to the top of the Carboniferous Limestone on the south and south-east. At the base of the succession occur limestones, calcareous mudstones, and sandstones, but from the base of the Namurian upwards shales are continuous until the millstone grit horizon.

=== Coal field ===
Sliabh an Iarainn is the most eastern part of the Connacht coal field. Well-marked escarpment lines are visible, partly exposed by lines of geological fault on all sides of the mountain valleys, the collapsed layers removed by denudation. The outcrop of two coal seams, crow coals with a sandstone roof and middle coal under a slate roof, are traceable some difficulty along the grit escarpment on the western side of Sliabh an Iarainn towards the Stony River valley, becoming completely obscured by drift deposits on the southern flanks, and on the eastern flanks to a mile North of Lough Nabellbeg continuing through the townlands of Sradrinagh and Cornamucklagh South obscured by a thick blanket of peat bog, becoming visible again further north on the western side of the hill at Cleighran More and Cleighran Beg where faults are evident. The outcrop of both coal seams is also traceable for 0.8 kilometres (0.5 mi) along the south-eastern slopes of Bencroy. More than two coal seams may be present at Sliabh an Iarainn, though the only rocks observable over the coal seams (in the millstone grit) are the lower coal measure containing black and brown splintery shales of a considerable thickness at Bencroy to the east and Barnameenagh to the west.

== Heritage ==
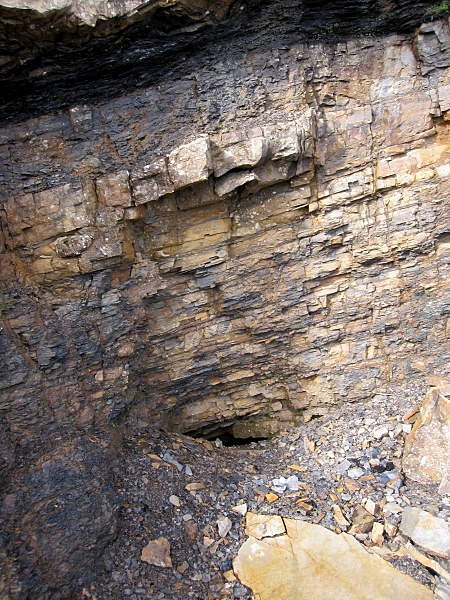
Disused Mineshaft near to Mullaghgarve and Moher, Leitrim; seems to be an entrance to one of the mining operations.

=== Literary project ===
The Sliabh an Iarainn project is a literary initiative started in 2004 to write about the history of the people who inhabited the necklace of townlands on the flanks of Sliabh-an-Iarainn and Ben Croy, in County Leitrim. The goal was to preserve a memory of the Ultachs, Catholic refugees displaced out of Ulster in 1795 who made a home on the mountain, their experiences of famine and emigration, and the resilience of the remaining communities. This social history was released in three volumes-

- Mountain Echoes, Sliabh an Iarainn's Story (Vol. 1)
- Mountain Shadows, Sliabh an Iarainn's Story (Vol. 2)
- Mountain Roots, Sliabh an Iarainn's Story (Vol. 3)

=== Ulster Plantation ===
In the 1609 Plantation of Ulster, Sliabh an Iarainn formed part of lands which were granted to John Sandford of Castle Doe, County Donegal (the father-in-law of Thomas Guyllym of Ballyconnell) by letters patent dated 7 July 1613 (Pat. 11 James I – LXXI – 38, Slewenerin). It was later sold by Sandford to his wife's uncle Toby Caulfeild, 1st Baron Caulfeild, Master of the Ordnance and Caulfield had the sale confirmed by letters patent of 12 July 1620 (Pat. 19 James I. XI. 45 Slewnerin).

=== Muintir-Eolais lake ===
In the remote mountainous Cuilcagh-Anierin uplands, an oligotrophic lake called "Lough Munter Eolas" is named after Eolais Mac Biobhsach and the Muintir Eolais, the most famous of the Leitrim sub-septs of the Conmaicne Rein). This lake straddles the border of Moneensauran townland in west County Cavan and Slievenakilla townland in south County Leitrim.

=== Iron industry ===
Iron Ore has been dug at Sliabh an Iarainn since the 1600s, the Ore rather tough like Spanish Iron. Commercial Iron works existed around Sliabh an Iarainn c. 1630, and though nearly all were destroyed during the Irish Rebellion of 1641, they were revived after the Irish Confederate Wars at the earliest, or in the 1690s after the Battle of the Boyne. Many smelting works employed English or other foreigners instead of Irish labour which generated much local hostility. The siting of Smelting works contiguous to Lough Allen allowed for the transportation of Pig Iron in boats of up to forty tons. Commercial iron mining declined after c. 1750 – c. 1760 as deforestation exhausted the fuel for burning charcoal.

==== Cornashamsoge Furnace ====
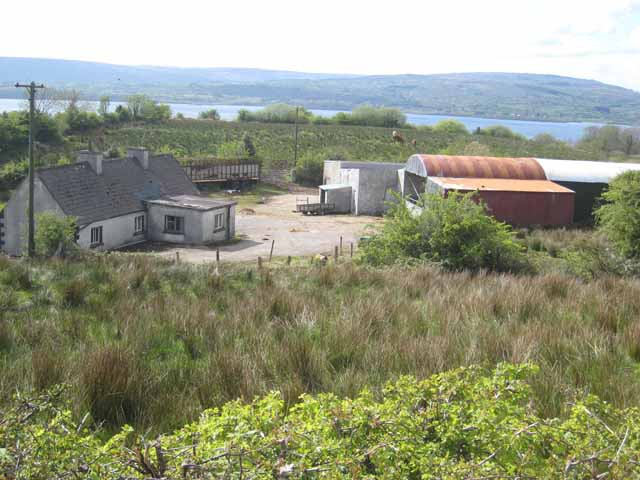
Cornashamsoge townland

In the 17th century the Cornashamsoge smelting works founded. Local tradition says "about the year 1650, there was a furnace for smelting Iron ore in the downland of Cornashameogue, situated on the east side of Lough Allen. The site of the furnace can still be pointed out, and the field in which it is situated has got the name of the Furnace Meadow". Cornashameogue is overlooked by the adjacent townland of Irish: Barnameenagh West, meaning 'top of the mines'.

==== Sliabh an Iarainn Leat ====
Local folklore recalls a so-called "Sliabh an Iarainn canal" connected with Cornashamsoge smelting works- "the ore had to be conveyed to the furnace for a distance of about 3 miles. For this purpose a canal was made. The canal ran by the foot of the mountain. Several rivers flow westward from the mountain into Lough Allen. The largest of these is the stoney river, a river that becomes a roaring torrent in times of heavy rain, often overflowing its banks, and causing great destruction, to lands, crops and houses. Build the time mentioned above, about the year 1650. The water of the stoney river was diverted into the canal. The canal then was fed principally by this river, and in a lesser degree by the other smaller rivers that ran in the same direction. All the rivers ran at right angles to the canal. The water also supplied the power that worked the furnace. As to the Slieve an Iren [Anerin] canal, there are but very meagre traces of it at the present time". His description best describes a Leat rather than a canal.

==== Drumshanbo Furnace ====
After the ironstone melted, the Pig iron was brought to Drumshanbo Finery forge to the south of Lough Allen to produce the malleable iron product which was transported to Dublin and Limerick by boat. (Note: The first ship built by the East India company in Limerick was supposedly finished with the product from Drumshanbo Iron works.) Folklore claims the "Iron ore was conveyed to the Drumshanbo furnaces by boat, on Lough Allen. The sources of supply, were, the Slieven an Iern [Anerin], Ballinaglera, Arigna mountains, all situated around Lough Allen. It is thought that the town of Drumshanbo had its origin in these industries". Drumshanbo Iron works closed in 1765.

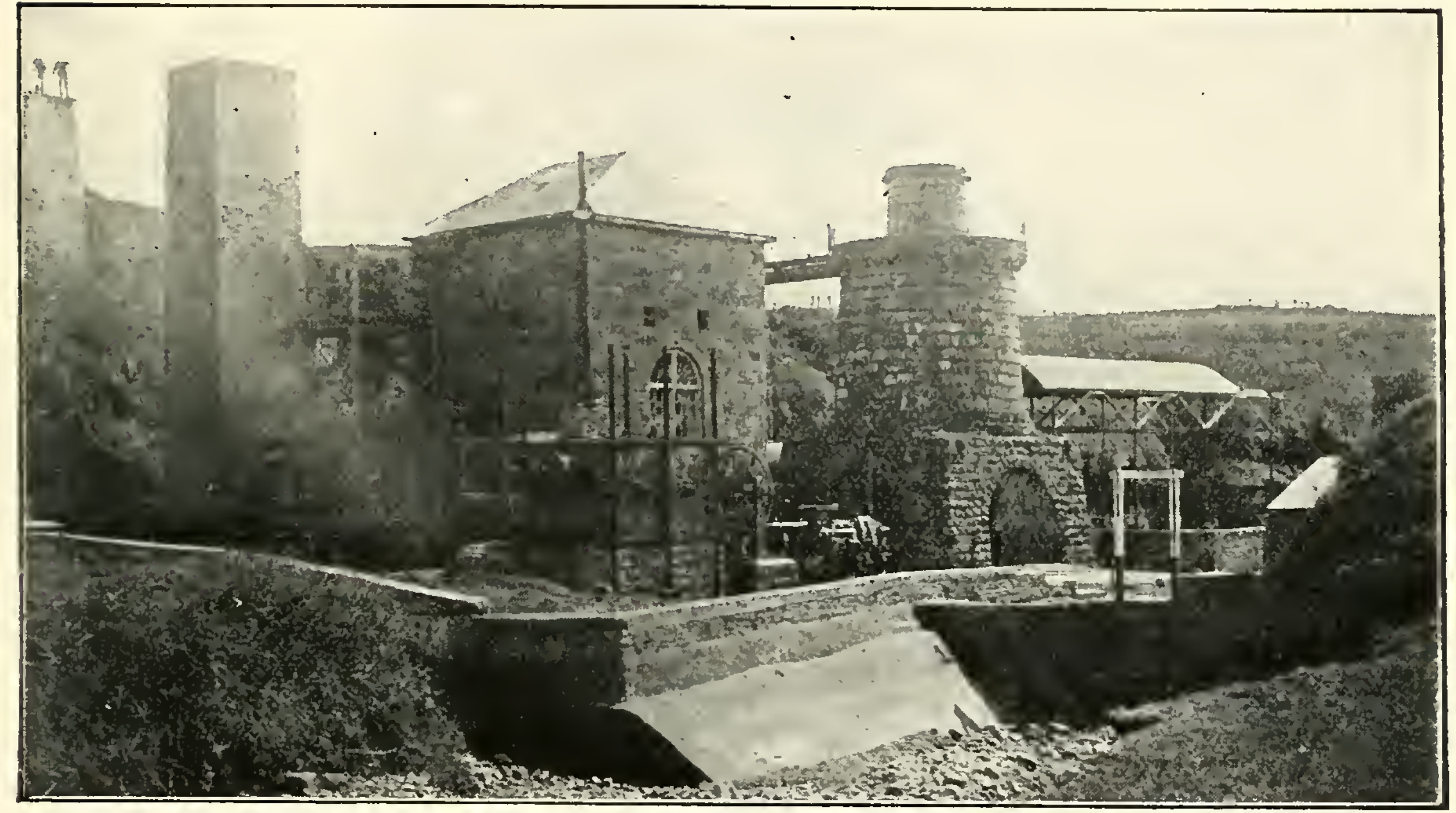
Creevlea- The last place in Ireland where Iron was manufactured.

==== Ballinamore Iron works ====
Ballinamore Iron works was established sometime after 1693 and continued production until probably 1747 when the business was put up for sale, the assets including a furnace, forge, slitting mill, mine yards, coal yards, large quantities of pig iron, mine and coals. (Note: At the same period as the Ballinamore Iron works, another Iron works at Dromod was in production.)

==== Creevlea Iron works ====
The last Iron works in Ireland, located at Creevelea in County Leitrim, closed around 1770 though they reopened again years later again. Crevelea works ceased production in 1858, and later attempts to revive the industry here complete failures.

==== Swanlinbar Iron works ====
There was an Iron works at Swanlinbar in County Cavan, right at the far north-east corner of Sliabh an Iarainn, though it had closed by 1785 according to an observer who wrote- "The furnaces of Ireland were never so forsaken and deplorable a way as they are at present... The great iron-works which were at Swanlinbar ... are abandoned".

=== Coal industry ===
In 1962, an attempt to mine the lower 1.1 metres (3 ft 7.3 in) thick coal-seam located about 366 metres (1,200.8 ft) west of the Rocking Stone ("Fionn MacCumhaill’s Rock") was abandoned, the coal being poor quality and seams non persistent. (Note: Yates states that Coal-seams are not unknown within the Millstone Grit series elsewhere, though they are typically poor in quality.) On the eastern side of Sliabh an Iarainn there is another abandoned level in the upper seam which is 0.3 metres (11.8 in) thick, the location possibly being above Aughacashel House.

=== Ancient forest ===
Long ago Ireland had been covered in Woodland, a claim echoed by a 19th-century survey of County Leitrim – "A hundred years ago almost the whole country was one continued, undivided forest, so that from Drumshanbo to Drumkeeran, a distance of nine or ten miles, one could travel the whole way from tree to tree by branches". These great forests in Leitrim and on the west side of Lough Allen were denuded for the making for Charcoal for Iron works around Sliabh an Iarainn. Immense piles of cleared timber existed at Drumshanbo in 1782.

== In mythology ==
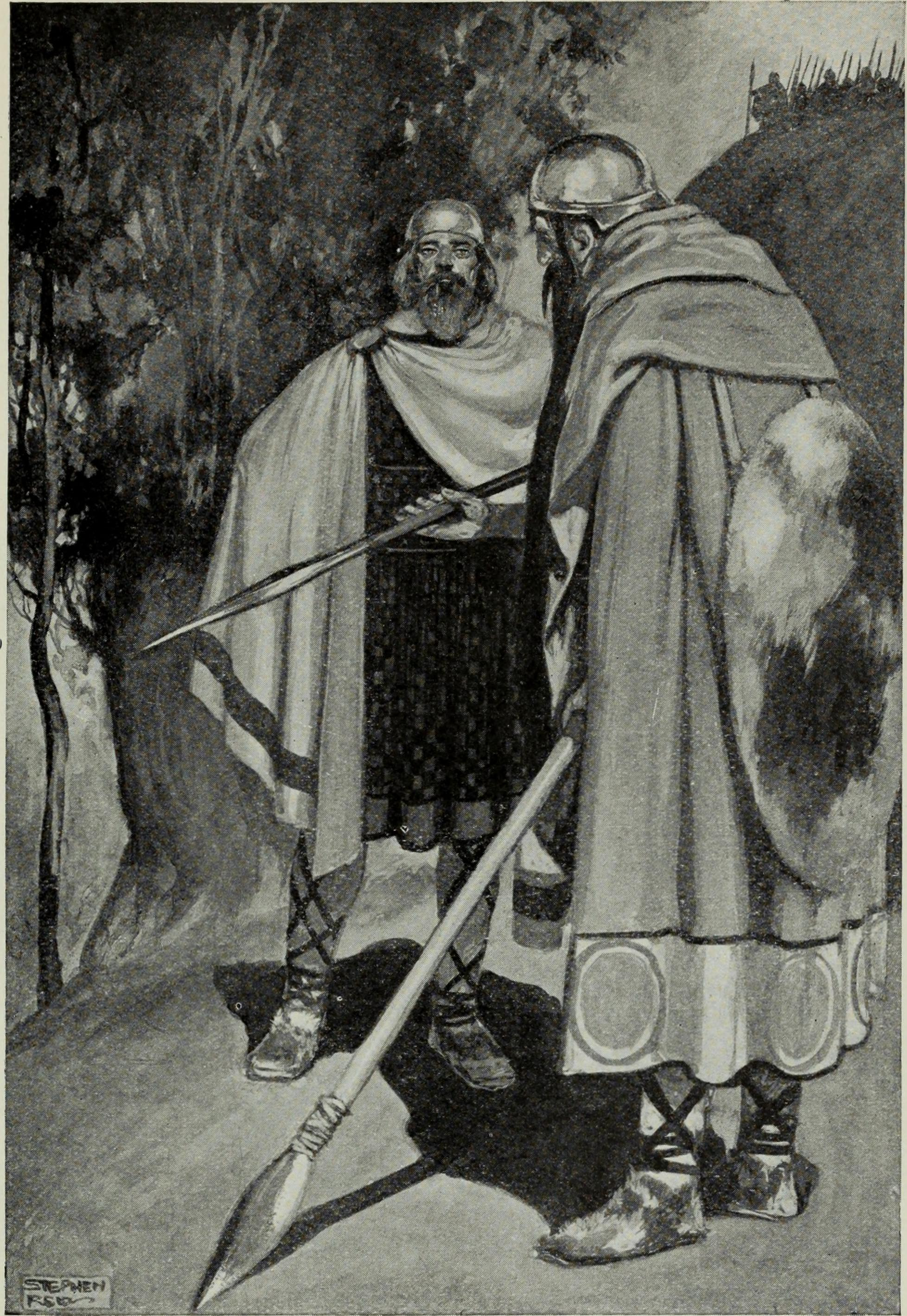
"The Two Ambassadors", by J. C. Leyendecker- Fir Bolg & Tuatha Dé Danann champions meet near Sliabh Comaicne, County Leitrim

=== Tuatha De Dannan ===
The Book of Invasions describes the Tuatha Dé Danann, tribe of the goddess Danu arriving in Mesolithic Ireland through the air before landing their floating-ships on the summit of Sliabh an Iarainn, "the mountain of Conmaicne Rein in Connacht". The men included Nuada the king, Manannan the powerful, Neit the battle god, and Goibniu the Smith. The women included Badb the battle goddess, Eadon the poets nurse, Brigit a goddess, and Dagna the goddess mother. Messengers informed Eochaid son of Ere, and king of the Fir Bolg, that a new race of people had settled in Ireland. The Firbolgs sent forward their champion Sreng and the Tuatha De Danann getting sight of his approach sent their champion Bres. The two champions had a meeting at Magh Rein below Sliabh an Iarainn but no peace was concluded. The Tuatha Dé Danann defeated the Firbolg at Battle of Moytura. (Note: An alternative oral folklore claims the battle between De Dannan and Firbolg occurred at Magh Rein.) Three centuries later the De Danann retreated to the Celtic Otherworld on being displaced by the Milesians, mythological ancestors of the Irish race.

For there by old tradition the Tuatha de Danann had first descended from heaven, giving to Sliab in larainn its peculiar sanctity. Among the old races skilled craftsmen, as we may still see in the Dublin Museum, proved their talent.

— Alice Stopford Green, History of the Irish State to 1014.

=== Gobán Saor ===
Metal workers were held in high esteem, and the Irish Pantheon Gobán Saor is synonymous with the legendary Scandinavian named Vaeland Smith and Goibniu of the Tuatha De Dannan. According to oral tradition, Gobán Saor ("Goibhenen"), Tuatha De Danann metalsmith, worked the mines here.

=== Ancient astronauts ===
Some fringe historians suggest a passage in the Book of Invasions concerning the appearance of the Tuatha Dé Danann in Ireland, records "the arrival of aliens in spacecraft with cloaking devices" at Sliabh an Iarainn. (Note: The passage approximates as "so that they were the Tuatha De Danand who came to Ireland. In this wise they came, in dark clouds. They landed on the mountains of Conmaicne Rein in Connacht and they brought a darkness over the sun for three days and three nights".)

=== Hunger stone ===
In the parish of Kiltubrid the term fear gorta (Irish for "hungry man") refers to a hunger which may supposedly afflict a person on the mountains, proving fatal if not quickly satisfied. This hunger is said to immediately seize any person who walks on a legendary "fear-gorta stone" at the base of Sliabh an Iarainn.

=== Fairies revenge ===
Oral tradition in Cavan described how a local man, "Turlough the Yellow-haired", asked the mountain fairies to destroy the Swanlinbar Iron works and send the foreigners away, and "the flood came rushing down from the mountain, from Binn Eachlainn, and it left neither mill nor wig nor man behind but swept them all down to Lough Erne".

== In popular culture ==
=== Podcasts ===
- In the Artifexian Podcast episode 36, one of the hosts, Edgar Grunewald, complains about the unfair description of Sliabh an Iarainn as an imposing "Mountain". He would later comment on the conflict over this description in episode 37 of the podcast

== See also ==
- List of Marilyns in Ireland.
- List of fossil sites worldwide.
- Geomythology

== References and notes ==
=== Sources ===
- Meehan, Joseph (1906). The Arms of the O'Rourkes : A Metal Casting from County Leitrim Seventeenth-Century Foundries (PDF). Vol. Journal of the Royal Society of Antiquaries of Ireland, Vol. XXXVI-Consecutive series, Vol. XVI-fifth series. Publisher Dublin, Ireland : The Society.
- Moody, Theodore William (1976). Theodore William Moody; Francis X. Martin; Francis John Byrne; Art Cosgrove (eds.). A New History of Ireland: Prehistoric and early Ireland. Vol. 1 of A New History of Ireland: Prehistoric and Early Ireland, Ed. by Daibhi O Croinin, W. E. Vaughan (illustrated, reprint ed.). Oxford University Press. ISBN 0198217374.
- Joyce, Patrick Weston; Sullivan, Alexander Martin (1902). A Comprehensive Atlas and Cyclopedia of Ireland [and] General History (Original from Pennsylvania State University ed.). Murphy & McCarthy.
- Meehan, Joseph B. (1926). "Cavan and Leitrim Items in 18th Century Periodicals. I." (PDF). The Breifny Antiquarian Society's Journal. II (III).
- O'Donovan, John (1858). "Elegy of Erard Mac Coise, Chief chronicler of the Gaels, pronounced over the tomb of Fergal O'Ruaric, Chief of Brefny, at Clonmacnoise". The Journal of the Kilkenny and South-east of Ireland Archaeological Society. 4 (Digitized 2014 from the original at the University of California ed.). The Society: 341–356.
- Ó Duígeannáin, Mícheál (1934). "Notes on the History of the Kingdom of Bréifne". The Journal of the Royal Society of Antiquaries of Ireland. 64–65 (1) (Digitized 2008 from the original at the University of California ed.). Royal Society of Antiquaries of Ireland: 113–140. JSTOR 25513764.
- Cockburn MacAndrew, Henry (1892). "Ireland before the Conquest". The Highland Monthly. 3 (Digitized 2007 from the original at Harvard University ed.). "Northern Chronicle" Office: 433–444.
- Correspondent (1882). The Timber, Woollen, and Pottery Industries of Ireland, review of paper by G. P. Bevan. Vol. The Furniture Gazette, XVII-New Series (An illustrated weekly journal, January - June ed.). 74, 75, Great Queen Street, Lincoln’s-Inn fields, London, W.C.
- Mulvihill, Mary (2003). Ingenious Ireland: A County-by-County Exploration of the Mysteries and Marvels of the Ingenious Irish. Simon and Schuster. ISBN 0684020947.
- Gribbon, Henry D. (1969). The history of water power in Ulster (Industrial archaeology of the British Isles) (illustrated ed.). David & Charles. ISBN 9780715344651.
- Templan, Paul (2010). "Irish Hill and Mountain Names" (PDF). mountainviews.ie. p. 14.
- Bolt Brash, Richard (1878). "The Precious Metals and Ancient Mining of Ireland". The Journal of the Royal Historical and Archaeological Association of Ireland. I. Fourth Series. Royal Historical and Archaeological Association of Ireland.
- Yates, Patricia J. (1962). "The Palaeontology of the Namurian Rocks of Slieve Anierin, Co. Leitrim, Eire" (PDF). Palaeontology. 5 (3). London : Palaeontological Association.
- Burek, Cynthia V.; Higgs, Bettie (2007). The Role of Women in the History of Geology. Vol. 281 of Special publication (illustrated ed.). Geological Society of London. ISBN 978-1862392274.
- Boate, Gerard (1652). Irelands Naturall History (Digitized 2009 ed.). Samuell Hartlib, For the Common Good of Ireland, and more especially, for the benefit of the Adventurers and Planters therein; Imprinted at London for John Wright at the Kings Head, in the Old Bayley.
- Geological Survey Ireland (1878). Explanation to Accompany Sheets 1-, Volume 60; Volumes 62-63; Volumes 65-90 (Report) (Digitized 2010 from the original at Cornell University ed.). H.M. Stationery Office.
- Buchan, Patrick (1860). "On the Composition of the Iron Ores of the Connaught Coal-field". The Journal of the Royal Dublin Society. 2 (Original from the University of California, digitized 20 Oct 2010 ed.): 1–27.
- Cooke, John (1906). Handbook for Travellers in Ireland (PDF). John Murray (Firm); London, Edward Stanford.
- Henry (1914). "Woods and Trees of Ireland". Journal of the County Louth Archaeological Society. Journal of the County Louth Archaeological Society Vol. 3, No. 3 (Dec) (3). County Louth Archaeological and History Society: 237–245. doi:10.2307/27728012. JSTOR 27728012.
- Cathbad Myers, Brendan (2006). The Mysteries of Druidry: Celtic Mysticism, Theory and Practice (illustrated ed.). Career Press. ISBN 1564148785.
- Connellan, Owen; O'Clery, Michael (1846). Philip MacDermott (ed.). The Annals of Ireland: Translated from the original Irish of the Four Masters (Digitized 20124 from the original in the Austrian National Library ed.). Geraghty.
- McLoughlin, Patrick (1938). "Slieve Anierin Canal and Cornashamsoge Furnace" (Online ed.). Cormongan, Co. Leitrim: Duchas. p. 528.
- Duncan, Leland L. (2013). Folklore of County Leitrim (Folklore History Series). Read Books Ltd. ISBN 9781447491316.
- Beveridge, Jan (2014). Children into Swans: Fairy Tales and the Pagan Imagination (reprint ed.). McGill-Queen's Press - MQUP. ISBN 978-0773596177.
- Mountain, Harry (1998). The Celtic Encyclopedia. Universal-Publishers. ISBN 9781581128901.
- Gregory, Lady (1904). Gods and fighting men : the story of the Tuatha de Danann and of the Fiana of Ireland (PDF). London : J. Murray.
- Mag Uidhir, Seán (1931). "The Iron Mill / Swanlinbar". Doegen Records Web Project, Royal Irish Academy.
- Colavito, Jason (2015). Foundations of Atlantis, Ancient Astronauts and Other Alternative Pasts: 148 Documents Cited by Writers of Fringe History, Translated with Annotations. McFarland. ISBN 978-1476619408.
- Stopford Green, Alice (1925). History of the Irish State to 1014 (PDF). Macmillan and Co.
- schoolchild (1938). "Origin of Sliabh an Iarainn and Lough Allen - Tuatha Dé Dannan". Drumshanbo: The Schools’ Collection, Volume 0207, Page 109.
- "Sliabh-an-Iarainn's Story". Sliabh-an-Iarainn Project.
- loganim.ie. "Barr na Mianach Thiar/Barnameenagh West".
