= Conal Ó Gráda =

Irish flute and tin whistle player

- Born: 1961 (age 64–65); Cork, Ireland
- Instrument: Flute
- Labels: Claddagh Records

Conal Ó Gráda (born in Cork 1961) is an Irish flute and tin whistle player and teacher.

== Career ==
Conal's debut recording The Top of Coom in 1990 is still regarded as a seminal recording of flute-playing. Conal has played, toured and recorded with many of the music's leading exponents and his second recording Cnoc Buí was released in 2008 to widespread critical acclaim.

As well as playing regularly with fiddler Maeve Donnelly, Conal is also a member of the group Raw Bar Collective, along with Offaly fiddler Dave Sheridan and Benny McCarthy of Danú fame.

In 2011, he published a flute technique book, "An Fheadóg Mhór: Irish Traditional Flute Technique".

== Discography ==
The Top of Coom Claddagh 1990

Cnoc Buí 2008

An Bodhrán with Colm Murphy

Anú Abú 2025
