= Yellow River (County Leitrim) =

Watercourse wholly in County Leitrim, Ireland

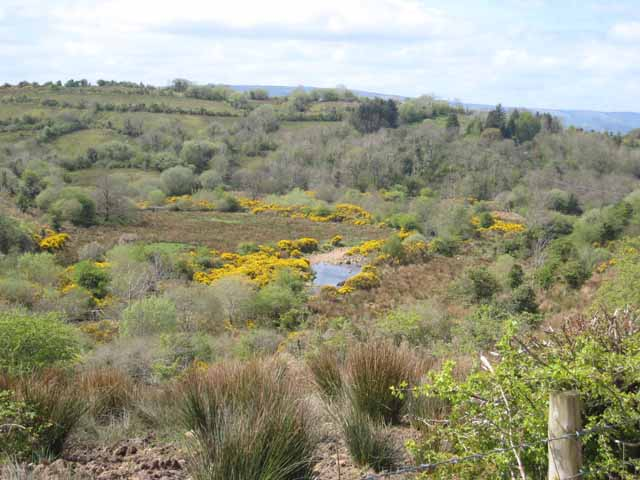
- Valley of the Yellow River

Location
- Country: Ireland

Physical characteristics
- Source
  - location: Slievenakilla, County Leitrim
  - coordinates: 54°08′23″N 7°54′10″W
- Mouth
  - location: Fahy on Lough Allen, County Leitrim
  - coordinates: 54°08′23″N 8°01′33″W

The Yellow River is a watercourse wholly in County Leitrim, Ireland. It is one of two rivers of this name in the county, the other originating at Doon, County Cavan.

== Course ==
The river is formed by the confluence of several short source arms that originate in the Slievenakilla townland, south of Benbrack Hill, near the border with County Cavan. The townland of Slievenakilla is practically divided by the Yellow River which flows initially west, passes under the road between Ballinagleragh and Stralongford, turns north and follows an approximate west-north-west course until Sranagarvanagh townland where it turns towards the southwest. At Fahy the river discharges into Lough Allen, effectively becoming a tributary of the River Shannon.

== Wildlife ==
Lapwings are customarily seen near the mouth of the Yellow River, also sandpipers and redshanks. Occasionally, little egrets have been observed, but did not breed.

== See also ==
- Rivers of Ireland
