= Mike Rafferty (flautist) =

Irish flutist

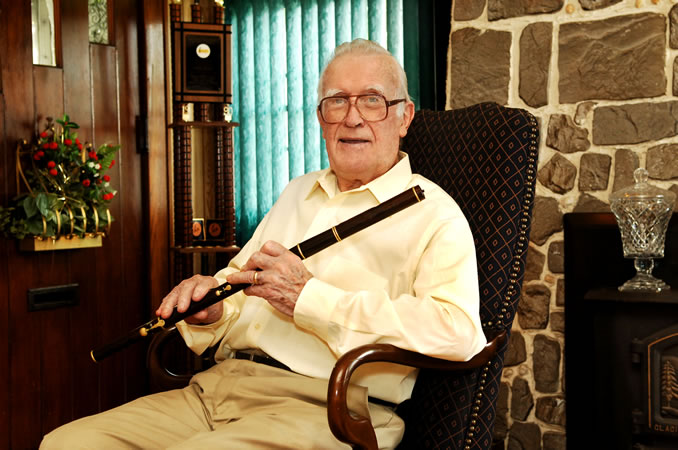
Rafferty in 2010

Mike Rafferty (1926–2011) was an Irish traditional flute player.

Rafferty was born on 26 September 1926 and grew up on a farm in Ballinakill, County Galway, Ireland. He learned music mainly from his father, Tom "Barrel" Rafferty who played the flute and uilleann pipes. Rafferty emigrated to the United States in 1949 and settled in northern New Jersey. He became known in the Irish traditional music scene in greater New York City and appeared at an extensive array of concerts and festivals all over US including the Smithsonian Institution's Bicentennial Festival of American Folklife in 1976, and toured with the Green Fields of America.

Rafferty was influential in helping Ireland's traditional music organization Comhaltas Ceoltóirí Éireann (CCE) establish itself in North America through the Martin Mulvihill Branch; since then, a branch has been named after him, the Michael Rafferty Branch in New Jersey. Rafferty made three recordings with his daughter, multi-instrumentalist Mary Rafferty Clancy, a solo recording, and a recording with fiddler Willie Kelly. He taught extensively, both privately and at The Catskills Irish Week, the Augusta Heritage Center, and the New Jersey State Council on the Folk Arts Apprenticeship Program. In 2003, Rafferty was named Irish Echo's Traditional Musician of the Year. In 2010, he was awarded a National Heritage Fellowship by the National Endowment for the Arts.

With Paddy Carty, Jack Coen, and a few others, Rafferty was known as one of the best exponents of the East Galway style of flute playing, a rolling, lyrical style that is somewhat slower and less ornamented than other Irish traditional flute styles.

== Discography ==
- The Dangerous Reel (with Mary Rafferty), 1995.
- The Old Fireside Music (with Mary Rafferty), 1998.
- The Road from Ballinakill (with Mary Rafferty), 2001.
- Speed 78, 2004.
- The New Broom (with Willie Kelly), 2009.
