= Rosclogher (barony) =

Barony in County Leitrim, Ireland

Rosclogher Ros Clochair (Irish)
- Barony
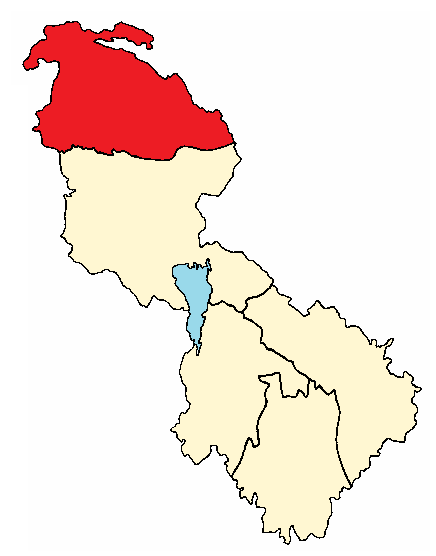
- Country: Ireland
- Province: Connacht
- County: Leitrim

Area
  - Total: 330.23 km^{2} (127.50 sq mi)

Rosclogher (Irish: Ros Clochair) is a barony in County Leitrim, Ireland.

== Etymology ==
Rosclogher barony takes its name from the townland of Rosclogher (Irish: Ros Clochair, "stony wooded height"), which gives its name to Rosclogher Castle.

== Location ==
Rosclogher is found in north County Leitrim, reaching from its 3 km (2 mi) of Atlantic coastline (the least coastline of any coastal county), past Lough Melvin, east of the Kilcoo River, up to Saddle Hill.

Rosclogher barony is bordered to the south by Drumahaire, County Leitrim; to the north by Tirhugh, County Donegal; to the east by Magheraboy and Clanawley, County Fermanagh; and to the west by the barony of Carbury, County Sligo.

== History ==
The O'Murroughs, or O'Murreys, were chiefs in the barony of Rosclogher. Their territory was the Hy Murragh. The Mac Murry or Mac Morrow were chiefs in Loghmoyltagh. The MacClancy's were chiefs of Dartraighe (Dartry) in the barony of Rosclogher. Uí Miadhachain (O'Meehan) is found here at the time of the Norman invasion of Ireland.

== List of settlements ==
Below is a list of settlements in Rosclogher barony:

- Kiltyclogher
- Kinlough
- Tullaghan
