= Fivemilebourne =

Fivemilebourne Abhainn an Chartúin
- Settlement
- Location in Ireland
- Coordinates: 54°16′28″N 8°19′47″W
- Country: Ireland
- Province: Connacht
- County: Leitrim
- Time zone: UTC+0 (WET)
  - Summer (DST): UTC-1 (IST (WEST))

Fivemilebourne (Irish: Abhainn an Chartúin) is a populated area of County Leitrim, Ireland. It lies within the civil parish of Drumlease and the historic barony of Drumahaire.
