= Paddy Carty =

Irish flute player

Paddy Carty (1929–1985) was a three-time all-Ireland champion Irish flute player from Loughrea, County Galway. He was well known for his flowing rhythm and his virtuoso skill on his Radcliff System flute, on which he could play freely in key signatures usually considered to be difficult on the Irish flute. He was a frequent playing partner of Paddy Fahey and a former member of the influential Aughrim Slopes Ceili Band.

== Discography ==
- Reels and Jigs in the Galway Manner (with Mick O'Connor), Master Collector #1
- Traditional Irish Music (with Mick O'Connor), 1971
- Traditional Music of Ireland (with Conor Tully and Frank Hogan), 1985
