= Drumkeeran =

Village in County Leitrim, Ireland

Drumkeeran Droim Caorthainn
- Village
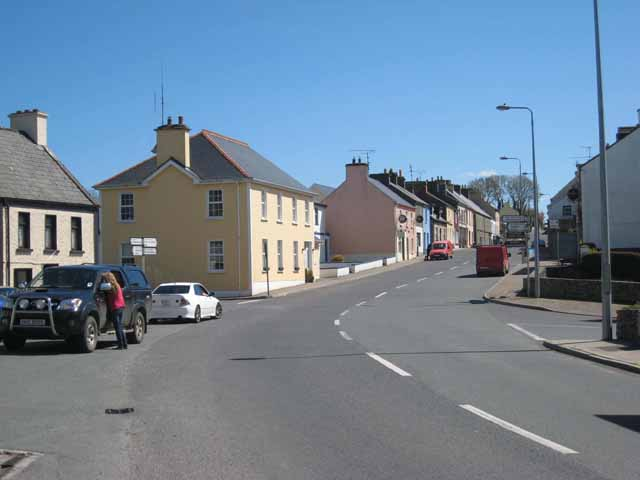
- Main Street (R280 road)

- Location in Ireland
- Coordinates: 54°10′13″N 8°08′33″W
- Country: Ireland
- Province: Connacht
- County: County Leitrim
- Elevation: 92 m (302 ft)

Population (2016)
  - Total: 220
- Irish Grid Reference: G902241

Drumkeeran (Irish: Droim Caorthainn), also Drumkeerin, is a village and townland in County Leitrim, Ireland, located at the junction of the R280 and R200 roads. It is situated in drumlin hills at the foot of Corry Mountain, just north of Lough Allen.

== History ==
Throughout at least the 19th and 20th centuries, a number of annual fairs were held at Drumkeeran on varying dates. In 1925, Drumkeerin village comprised 54 houses, 11 being licensed to sell alcohol.

As with much of the rest of Ireland, the area was historically covered in woodland, as reflected in a 19th-century survey of Leitrim which stated that "A hundred years ago almost the whole country was one continued, undivided forest, so that from Drumshanbo to Drumkeeran, a distance of nine or ten miles, one could travel the whole way from tree to tree by branches". These forests in County Leitrim, on the west side of Lough Allen, were denuded for the making for charcoal for iron works around Slieve Anierin. Large piles of cleared timber existed in this area in 1782.

== Community organisations ==
The Drumkeerin Development Association was formed around 1970. In 1986, Drumkeerin Community Council was established to address the economic development of the village. In 1992, the Drumkeerin Tourist and Development Company was incorporated in order to effect some of the council's plans.

Drumkeerin GAA club was founded in 1933 and represents the parish area of Inishmagrath.

== Transport ==
Bus Éireann route 462 serves the village on Fridays providing links to Sligo and Manorhamilton. Route 469 serves the village on Saturdays providing a link to Drumshanbo, Carrick on Shannon and Longford.

== Churches ==
Churches in the area include St Brigid's Roman Catholic church (built 1869), St Joseph's Church of Ireland church (1833), and St Patricia's Presbyterian church (1844).

== Notable people ==
- John McKenna (1880–1947), flautist from the area
- Mary McPartlan (1955–2020), traditional Irish singer
- Vincent Woods (born 1960), poet and playwright from Tarmon near Drumkeerin

== See also ==
- List of towns and villages in Ireland
