= Dowra =

Village in counties Cavan and Leitrim, Ireland

Coordinates: 54°11′22.68″N 8°0′54.15″W

Dowra An Damhshraith
- Village
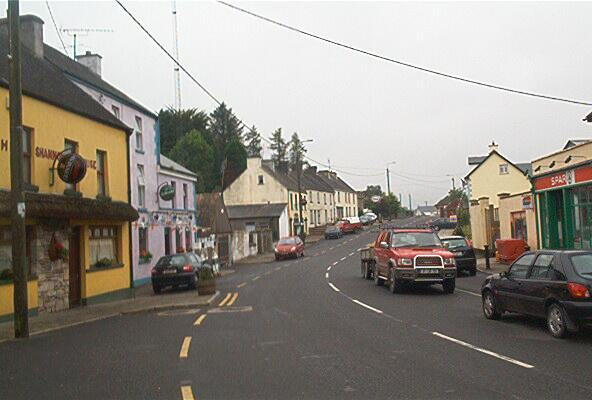
- Looking east - up 'Main Street' - on the Cavan side

- Location in Ireland
- Country: Ireland
- Province: Ulster; Connacht (Part)
- County: Cavan; Leitrim (Part)
- Elevation: 57 m (187 ft)

Population (2002)
  - Total: 147
- Time zone: UTC+0 (WET)
  - Summer (DST): UTC-1 (IST (WEST))
- Irish Grid Reference: G989267

Dowra (Irish: An Damhshraith, meaning 'the river-meadow of the ox') is a village and townland in northwest County Cavan, Ireland. Located in a valley on Lough Allen, it is the first village on, and marks the uppermost navigable point of, the River Shannon. On one side of its bridge is County Cavan; on the other is County Leitrim. The nucleus of the village is situated on the Cavan side. It is located on the junction of the R200 and R207 regional roads.

== History ==
The village was formed in the late 19th century after another village close by, Tober, was washed away by landslides in the summer of 1863. Back in 1925, Dowra village comprised 18 houses, with 10 being licensed to sell alcohol.

The remains of the Black Pig's Dyke can be seen outside the village. It is noted on the Ordnance Survey's Edition of 1911 Six-inch to One-mile map, 1/2 mile west of Dowra alongside the River Shannon (forming part of the Leitrim / Cavan border) - see Leitrim Sheet 5. It is again noted 3/4 mile downstream just below where the Owennayla River joins the Shannon on the east side of Canbeg Township, County Leitrim - see Leitrim Sheet 18.

== Places of interest ==
The source of the River Shannon, known as the Shannon Pot is located about 12 km (7 miles) to the north. The Cavan Way hiking trail starts in the village and the Leitrim Way passes through it. The Miners' Way is nearby.

Restoration of Dowra Courthouse was completed in 2014 with the new building opening as a Community Creative Arts Space.

== Transport ==
Bus Éireann route 462 serves Dowra on Saturdays only linking it to Drumkeeran, Dromahair and Sligo.

== Economy ==
The main industries in the locality are agriculture, forestry and construction. There is a livestock market held every Saturday.

== Education ==
The local national school is in County Leitrim, just across the bridge from the village centre.

== Religion ==
The village church is located approximately 5 km north and is called the Church of the Immaculate Conception, Doobally.

== Gallery ==
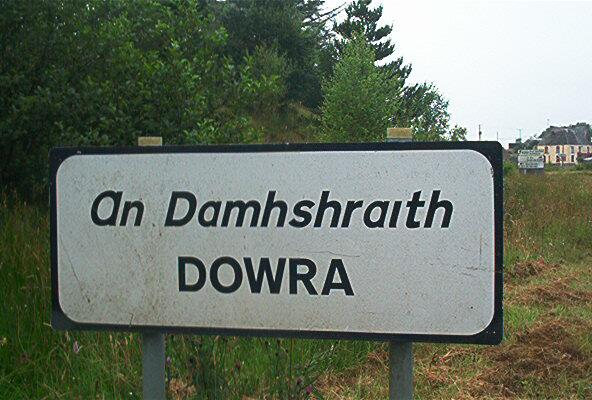
Dowra - An Damhshraith

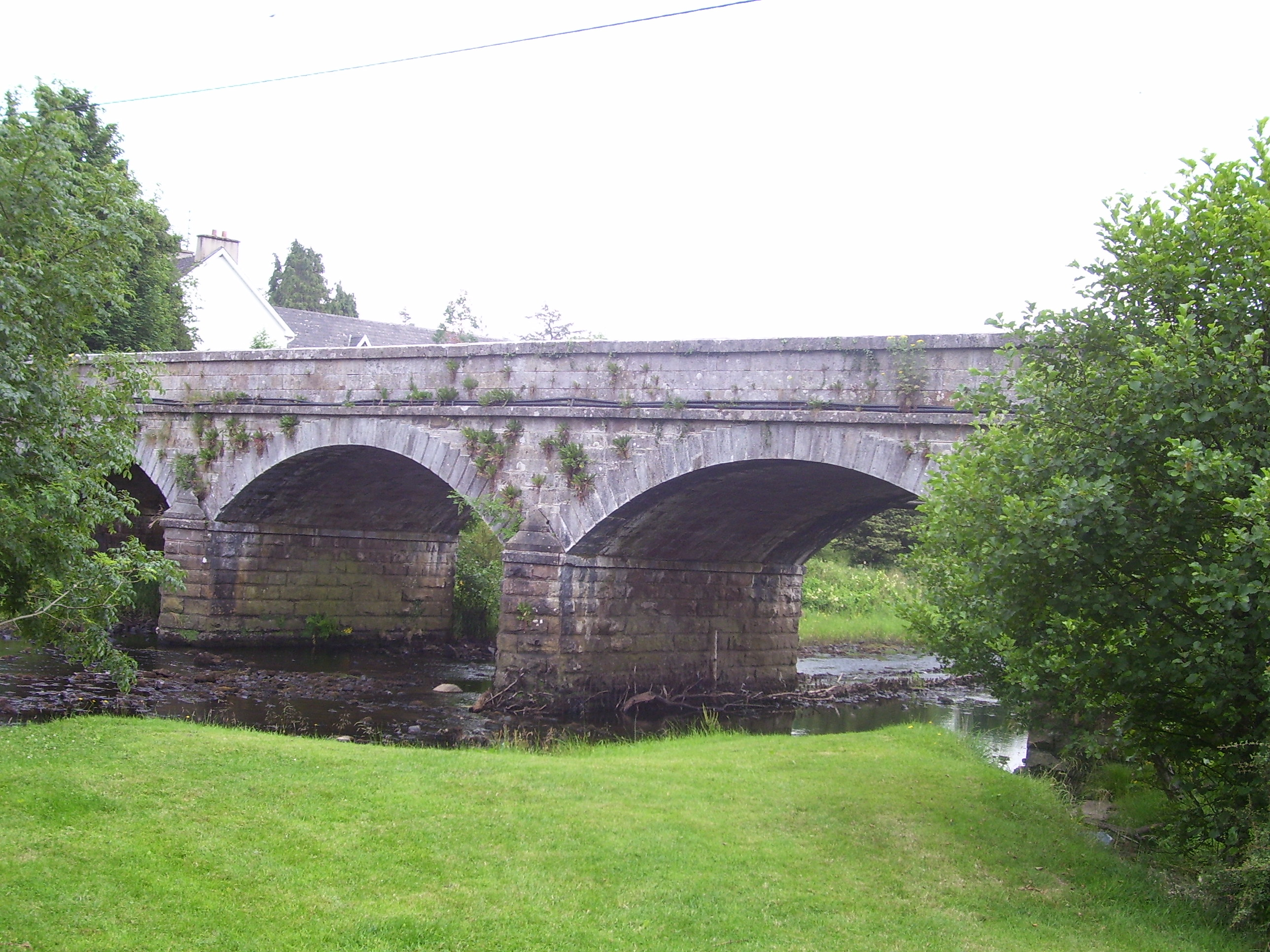
Dowra Bridge - first town on the Shannon

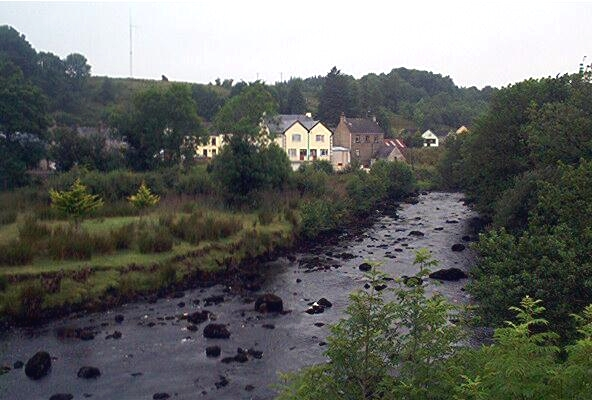
The River Shannon immediately upstream of Dowra Bridge

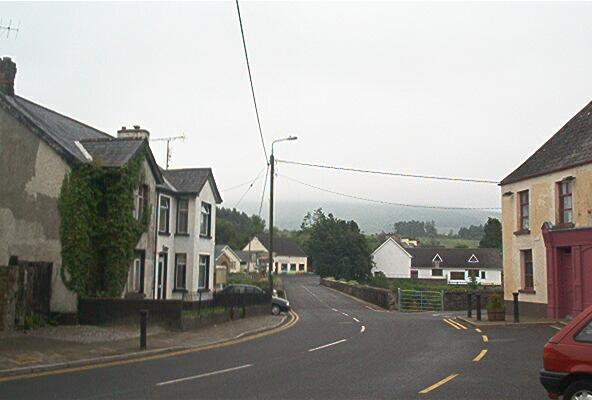
Looking across the bridge towards Leitrim

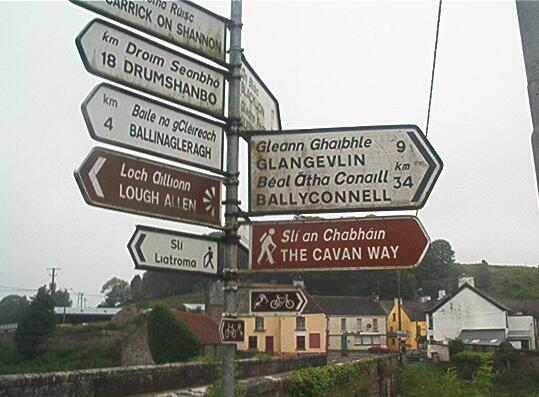
Directions to everywhere

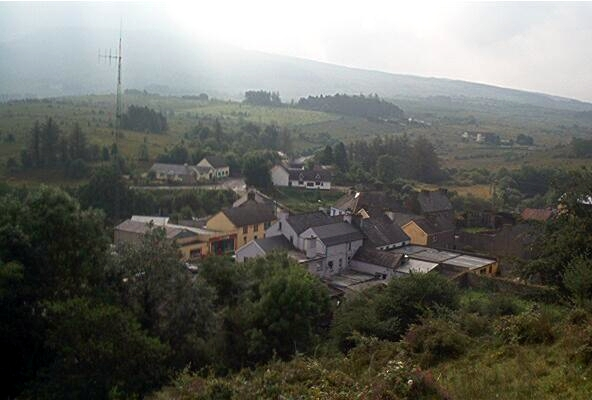
Dowra from above the old Garda barracks

== See also ==
- List of towns and villages in Ireland
- The Dowra affair
