= R207 road (Ireland) =

Road in Ireland

R207 road
- Bóthar R207

Route information
- Length: 35 km (22 mi)

Location
- Country: Ireland
- Primary destinations: County Leitrim; Leaves the N16 near Blacklion; Dowra - (R200); Ballinagleragh - follows the eastern shore of Lough Allen for 15km; Drumshanbo - (R208); Terminates at the R280 3km north of Leitrim

Highway system
- Roads in Ireland; Motorways; Primary; Secondary; Regional

The R207 road is a regional road in Ireland linking the N16 national primary road near the Northern Ireland border to the R280 10 km north of Carrick-on-Shannon in County Leitrim.

En route it passes through Dowra, follows the eastern shore of Lough Allen for 15 km to Drumshanbo. It terminates 3 km north of Leitrim village. The road is 35 km (22 mi) long and the entire route is in County Leitrim.

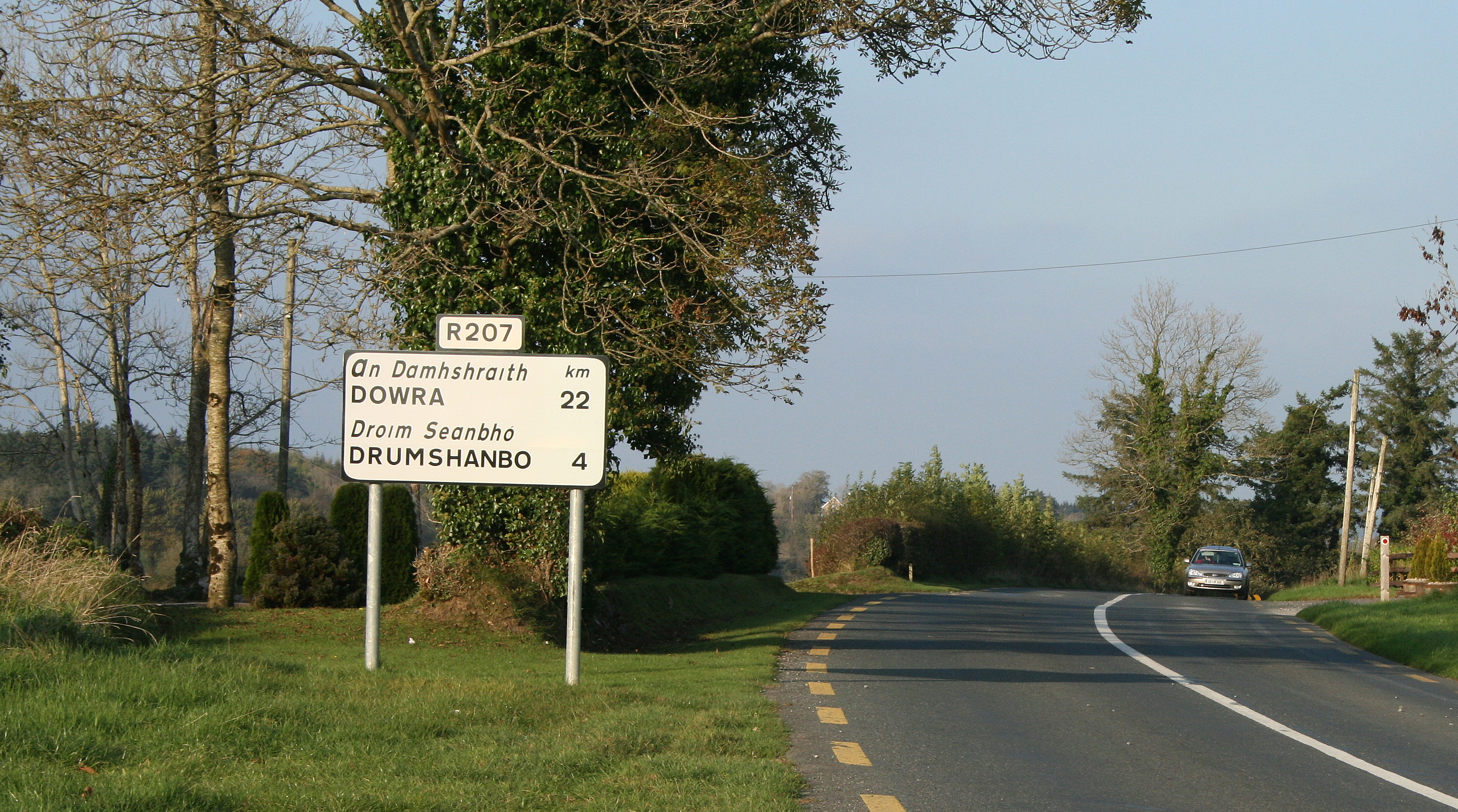
R207 destination sign Clickable image: click a sign to go to its destination article

== See also ==
- Roads in Ireland
- National primary road
- National secondary road
