= Charles Nicholson (flautist) =

English inventor and flautist

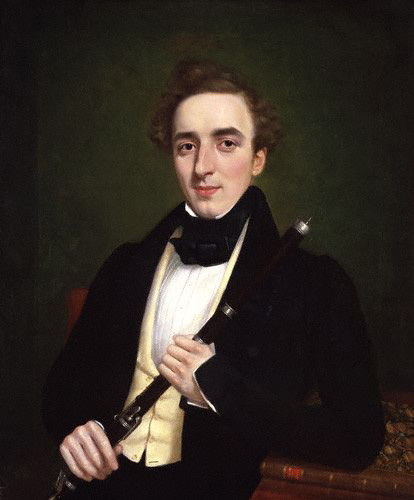
Charles Nicholson (1834)

Charles Nicholson (1795–1837), was a Liverpool-born flautist and composer, who performed regularly in London. He was soloist at many of the Philharmonic Society Concerts from 1816-1836, and first flautist with the principal theater orchestras. He toured extensively in Britain, but never on the Continent. Besides giving classes to many students, he wrote tutors for flute-playing which were published throughout the 19th century.

Nicholson used a flute made by George Astor & Co., a London-based firm operating from c1778 to c1831. His father, also a celebrated flautist, modified the instrument, lining the headpiece with metal, enlarging the embouchure and toneholes with a view to making the flute's tone more powerful, yet still delicate, permitting the usual fingerings in the third octave, facilitating glides and vibratos.

Once his bravura style on the modified flute had become accepted in London, he licensed several London flute makers such as Clementi & Co., Astor, Rudall and Rose, and Potter to produce the 'Nicholson's Improved'. The structure of his new flute favoured flat keys such as E flat, A flat, and F and C minor. Nicholson's variations on Roslin Castle, in F minor which he wrote in 1836, are typical of the 'National Melodies' in the adagio style in which he excelled. These remained important features of English flute-playing until after 1890.

Even though Ardal Powell regards Nicholson as "the first native professional instrumentalist to achieve star status in Britain", Nicholson's present renown owes less to his personal style of playing than to Theobald Boehm's being greatly impressed by the flute's powerful tone on a visit in 1831. Writing to Mr. Broadwood in August 1871, Boehm notes: "I did as well as any continental flutist could have done, in London, in 1831, but I could not match Nicholson in power of tone, wherefore I set to work to remodel my flute. Had I not heard him, probably the Boehm flute would never have been made." He also says "I was struck with the volume of the tone of Nicholson, who was then in the full vigour of his talent. This power was the result of the extraordinary size of the holes of his flute, but it required his marvellous skill and his excellent embouchure to mask the want of accuracy of intonation and equality of tone resulting from the position of the holes, which was incorrect and repugnant to the elementary principles of acoustics". From all accounts Nicholson had uncommonly large hands, and had even larger holes on his personal flute than those on the flutes bearing his name.

Boehm promptly designed and marketed a new flute, embodying the earliest recognizable features of the modern flute.
