= Lough Allen =

Lake in Leitrim/Roscommon, Ireland

- Loch Aillionn (Irish)
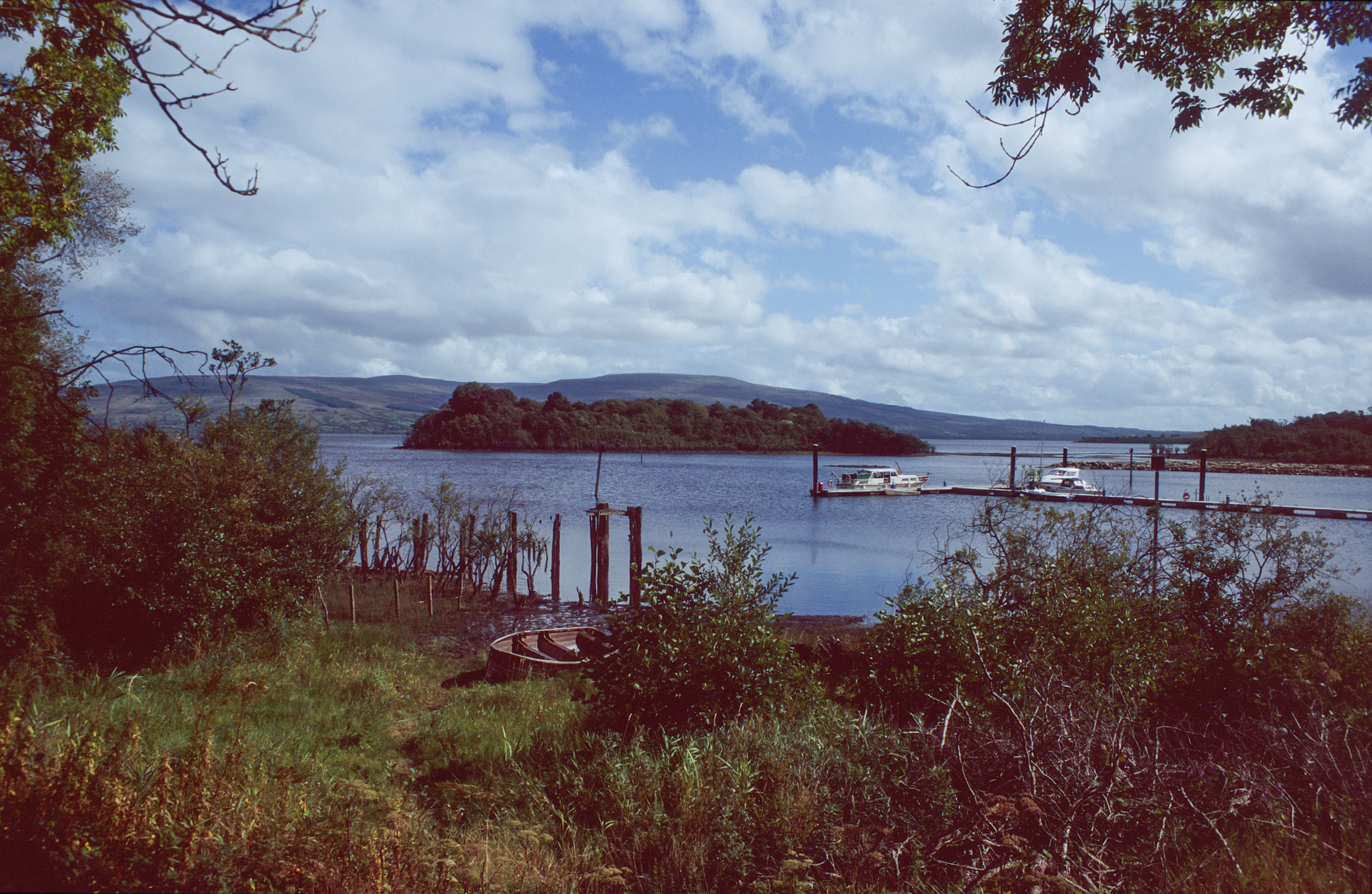
- Spencer Harbour

- Location within island of Ireland
- Location: County Leitrim
- Coordinates: 54°06′25″N 8°02′21″W
- Primary inflows: River Shannon
- Primary outflows: River Shannon
- Basin countries: Ireland
- Max. length: 17.7 km (11.0 mi)
- Max. width: 4.8 km (3.0 mi)
- Surface area: 35 km^{2} (14 sq mi)
- Average depth: 4–5 m (13–16 ft)
- Max. depth: 31 m (102 ft)
- Islands: Corry Island, Drummans Island, Inishmagrath
- Settlements: Arigna, Ballinaglera, Drumshanbo, Drumkeeran, Dowra, Keadue

Lough Allen (Irish: Loch Aillionn) is a lake on the River Shannon in northeastern Connacht, Ireland. Most of the lake is in County Leitrim, with a smaller part in County Roscommon. The lake lies to the south of the River Shannon's source, near the Iron Mountains, and is the uppermost of the three main lakes on the river. The other two, Lough Ree and Lough Derg are much further to the south.

== Geography ==
Lough Allen, out of which the Shannon takes its source, is nine miles long, and three miles wide. The lake is shaped like an isosceles triangle. The Shannon enters the lake at the wider northern end and leaves the lake at the narrow southern end. Other rivers that feed the lake include the Diffagher (northwest), the Yellow (northeast), the Stoney (east) and the Arigna (southwest). The R280 regional road skirts the west side of the lake, while the R207 follows the east bank, from Ballinagleragh to Drumshanbo. The R200 road is on the north side of the lake, traveling west from Dowra to Drumkeeran. Slieve Anierin lie to the east of Lough Allen. There has been speculation that notable reserves of oil and gas lie beneath the Allen basin.

== Ecology ==
Between c. 2001 – c. 2003, water quality was reported to be excellent with an oligotrophic rating. (Note: Trophic states of "Oligotrophic" and "Mesotrophic" are desirable, but freshwater lakes rated 'Eutrophic' or 'Hypertrophic' indicates pollution.) The pike population is the "native Irish strain" (Irish: liús meaning 'Irish Pike') not the other European Pike strain (Irish: gailliasc meaning 'strange or foreign fish'). The ecology of Lough Allen, and other Irish waterways, remain threatened by curly waterweed, zebra mussel, and freshwater clam invasive species.

== Prehistory ==
Significant traces of Mesolithic inhabitation have been found around the lakeshore, with hundreds of stone tools collected. In total almost 1000 stone tools were collected during a set of surveys by Killian Driscoll, and 95% were formed on silicified dolomite, which outcrops locally. The remaining 5% were formed from flint, chert and quartz, along with the shale/mudstone and basalt ground/polished axes. The majority of the stone tools are characteristic of the Later Mesolithic, with possible evidence for the Early Mesolithic and limited evidence for Neolithic activity. The assemblage includes a number of stone axes and axe roughouts, and the roughouts represent the first recorded, by the Irish Stone Axe Project, as found in a lakeside context in Ireland, with most previously provenanced examples coming from axe quarry sites.

== History ==
=== Ironworks ===
Iron ore has been extracted at Slieve Anierin for millennia. From the early 17th century a number of mines and works were conveniently contiguous to Lough Allen, allowing for the transportation of iron ore over water to the ironworks in boats of up to forty tons. During the Irish Rebellion of 1641 nearly all ironworks were destroyed, but many were revived by the English after the Irish Confederate Wars. Extensive forests around Lough Allen before the 17th century were denuded to make charcoal for ironworks, the industry later collapsing in the 19th century.

=== Reservoir ===
On the construction of the Shannon hydroelectric scheme in 1925–9, the lake became a storage reservoir for the power station nearly 100 miles away, with sluices to control the flow into the river. This helps to maintain the flow during dry periods and manage flooding at other times. It made the Lough Allen Canal, which was rarely used by this time, unusable until restored in 1996.

=== Regattas ===
In the mid-19th century, regattas were held by M. O'Conor at Lough Allen Island which is also known as O'Reilly's Island at the southern end of the lake. The house is destroyed, and only a ruin now exists. Regatta parties were held at Birchill's House, Blackrock. E.K. Tenison of Kilronan Castle, the photographer, Captain Tottenham, Captain Birchill and Francis la Touche attended the Regatta parties. Among the yachts competing in the regattas were 'Corsair', 'Avenger', 'Querida', 'Meta' and 'Shamrock'. The Water Wags from Dun Laoghaire, organised a regatta on Lough Allen, in September 2015, for their 14'-3" long historic open clinker dinghies. competed in a regatta in 2014, including Penelope (1933), Scallywag, Swift, Moosmie (1910), Mollie, Chloe, Marie Louise (1927) and Good Hope. This was probably the first regatta on the lake since the mid-19th century.

== See also ==
- List of loughs in Ireland
- Slieve Anierin

== References and notes ==
=== Secondary sources ===
- Clenaghan, Conor; Clinton, Frank; Crowe, Matthew (2005). Phosphorus Regulations National Implementation Report (PDF) (Report). Environmental Protection Agency, Office of Environmental Enforcement. Archived (PDF) from the original on 25 October 2017.
- Pedreschi, D.; Kelly-Quinn, M.; Caffrey, J; O'Grady, M.; Mariani, S.; Phillimore, A. (2014), "Genetic structure of pike (Esox lucius) reveals a complex and previously unrecognized colonization history of Ireland", Journal of Biogeography, 41 (3), Journal of Biogeography, 41(3), 548–560.: 548–560, Bibcode:2014JBiog..41..548P, doi:10.1111/jbi.12220, PMC 4238397, PMID 25435649, S2CID 13486116
- Boate, Gerard (1653). Irelands Naturall History (Digitized 2009 ed.). Samuell Hartlib, For the Common Good of Ireland, and more especially, for the benefit of the Adventurers and Planters therein; Imprinted at London for John Wright at the Kings Head, in the Old Bayley. Archived from the original on 24 February 2017.
