= Drumshanbo =

Town in County Leitrim, Ireland

Drumshanbo Droim Seanbhó
- Town
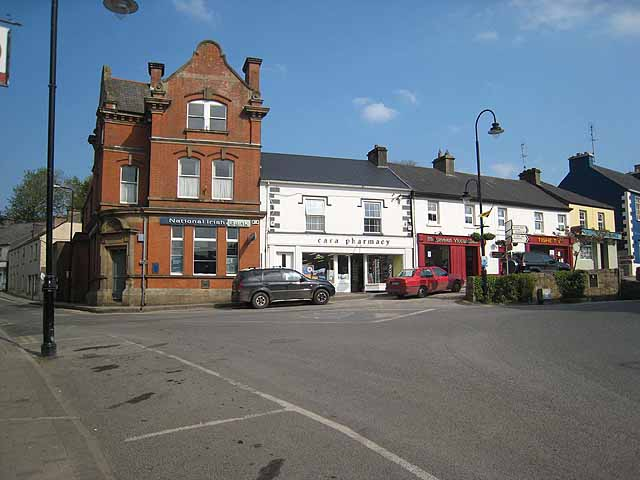
- Market Square

- Location in Ireland
- Coordinates: 54°03′00″N 8°02′00″W
- Country: Ireland
- Province: Connacht
- County: County Leitrim

Population (2022)
  - Total: 1,240
- Irish Grid Reference: G978111

Drumshanbo (Irish: Droim Seanbhó, meaning 'ridge of the old cow') is a small town situated in the centre of County Leitrim, Ireland. Drumshanbo is surrounded by hills, woodlands, lakes and the Sliabh an Iarainn and Arigna mountains. It is served by a number of traditional pubs, shops and restaurants.

== Geography ==
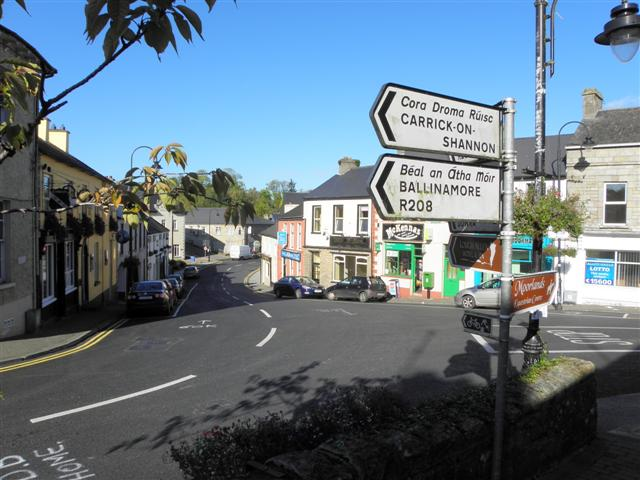
The Square, Drumshanbo

Drumshanbo is situated at the lower tip of Lough Allen, the third biggest lake on the Shannon. It is overlooked by Sliabh an Iarainn, the iron mountain, which is approximately 585 metres high and is associated with a history of iron mining.

== History ==
Drumshanbo town originated from the extensive iron industry around Slieve Anierin from the 17th century. Pig iron produced at iron smelting works on the east of Slieve Anierin was brought south across Lough Allen to Drumshanbo finery forge where a malleable iron product was produced and transported to Dublin and Limerick by boat. The first ship built by the East India company in Limerick was supposedly finished with the product from Drumshanbo Iron works.

According to folklore, the "Iron ore was conveyed to the Drumshanbo furnaces by boat, on Lough Allen, supplied from Slieven an Iern [Anerin], Ballinaglera, Arigna mountains, all situated around Lough Allen". Ireland was historically covered in woodland, as echoed in a 19th-century survey of Leitrim which stated that "A hundred years ago almost the whole country was one continued, undivided forest, so that from Drumshanbo to Drumkeeran, a distance of nine or ten miles, one could travel the whole way from tree to tree by branches". These former forests in Leitrim, and on the west side of Lough Allen, were denuded for the making of charcoal for iron works around Slieve Anierin. Large piles of cleared timber existed at Drumshanbo in 1782.

Throughout at least the 19th and 20th centuries, fairs were held at Drumshanbo. These were formerly held on 12 February (or 15th), 12 May (or 17th), 11 (or 16) July, 6 October, and 16 November. In 1925, Drumshanbo village comprised 77 houses, 17 being licensed to sell alcohol.

Approximately 500 victims of the Great Famine are buried at a famine-period burial ground at Drumshanbo.

== Economy ==
Local industries include metalwork fabrication, sign-makers, plant hire and refuse disposal, tele-sales, joinery works and several small craft businesses.

The Shed Distillery was established in the town in 2014 in a former jam factory. It produces whiskey, vodka and gin for the national and international markets, including Drumshanbo Gunpowder Irish Gin which won International Spirit Brand of the Year at the 2022 Wine Enthusiast Wine Star Awards. As of 2022, the distillery was employing over 80 people.

== Transport ==
The town is centred on the crossroads of the R207 and R208 regional roads.

=== Rail transport ===
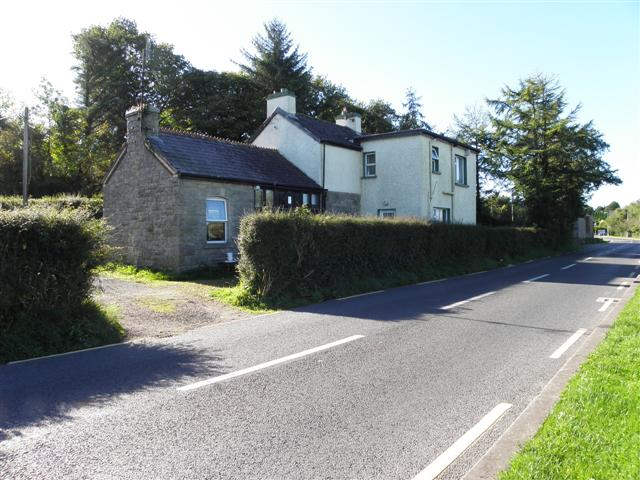
Former railway station building, Drumshanbo

Drumshanbo railway station opened on 2 May 1888, but finally closed on 1 April 1959. It was part of the narrow gauge Cavan and Leitrim Railway. Today the nearest rail services may be accessed at Carrick-on-Shannon railway station around 14 km (8.5 miles) away.

=== Bus/coach transport ===
Westlink Coaches operate a daily commuter service between Drumshanbo and Sligo via Carrick-on-Shannon. Drumshanbo is also served by Bus Éireann route 462 on Fridays and Saturdays linking it to Sligo and by Saturday-only route 469 linking it to Carrick-on-Shannon and Longford.

== Tourism and facilities ==
In the centre of the town there is the Sliabh an Iarainn Visitor Centre, where an audio-visual display takes visitors through local scenery and highlights the history of coal and iron mining in the area. A number of walks, including hill-walking trails, are located within a 5-km (3 mile) radius of Drumshanbo. Several walking routes around the lake have been sign-posted by Leitrim County Council. The Leitrim Way (Slí Liatroma) is a 48-kilometre (30 mi) walk between Drumshanbo, Dowra, and Manorhamilton.

One kilometre outside the town is the heated outdoor swimming pool at Acres Lake Amenity. There are also tennis courts, a playground, and a jetty for cruisers which have travelled from Carrick on Shannon via Leitrim village. The Teach Ceoil (Music House) is also situated here. It is used as a venue for music sessions.

In 2003, the Lough Allen Hotel and Spa opened on the shore of Lough Allen. Nearby, the Mayflower Community Centre hosts bingo events, provides Irish handball and badminton facilities, and hosts occasional events such as discos, concerts, plays and a mobile cinema. Aras Padraig is another community premises which is used for various local groups to meet, and some classes are organised there by a local women's group.

== Sport ==
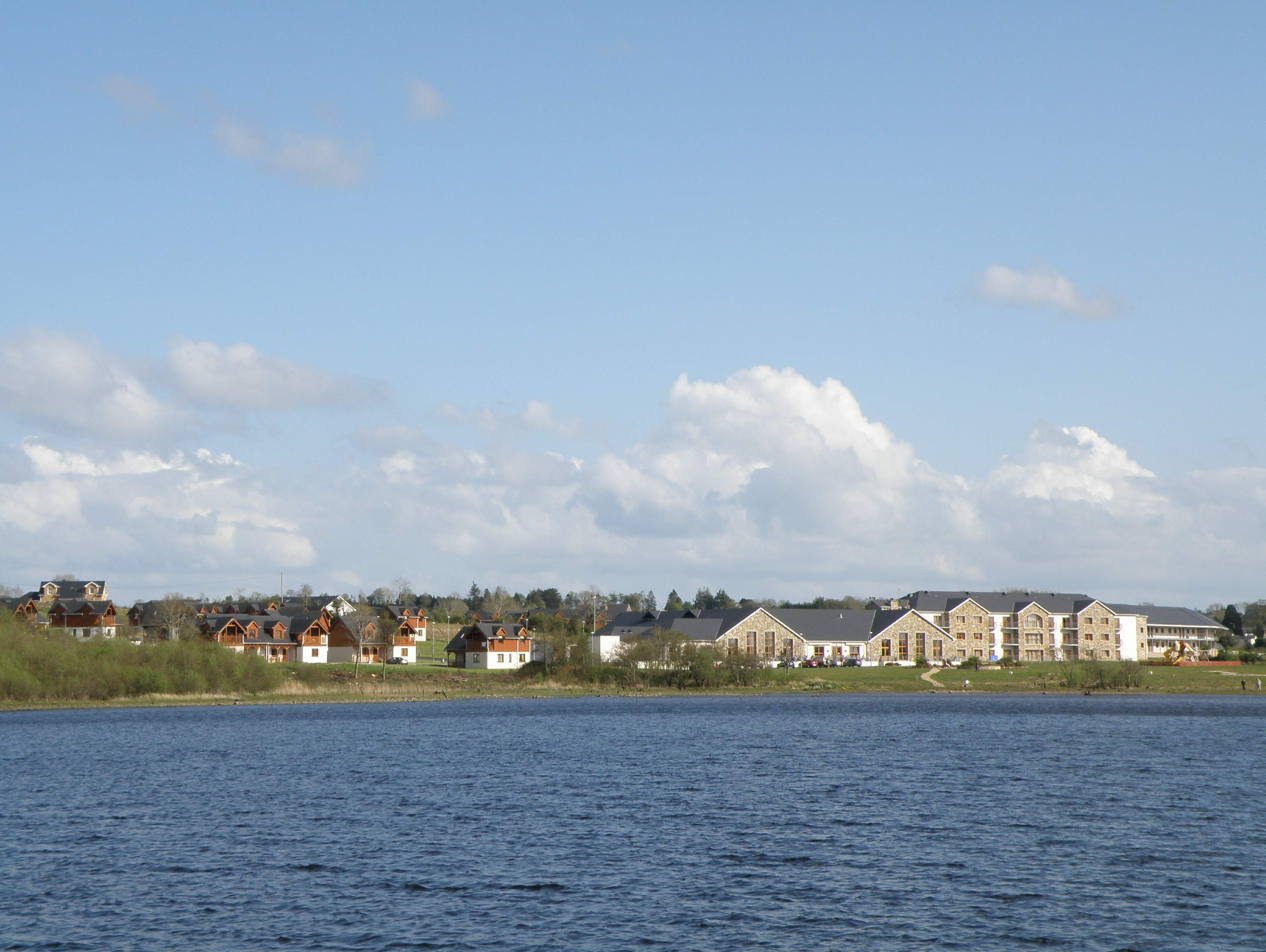
Drumshanbo, Lough Allen

Lough Allen is the largest lake in the vicinity and has a reputation for coarse angling with a plentiful supply of trout, pike, perch, rudd and roach. It is possible to rent cruisers to navigate the surrounding waterways. Lough Allen also is used for wind surfing, canoeing and other water sports.

There are four golf courses in the area, including Carrick on Shannon (18 holes), Blacklion (9 holes), Slieve Russell (18 holes), and Ballinamore (9 holes).

Allen Gaels are the local GAA club, and have been county champions in both Gaelic football and hurling.

Moorlands Equestrian Centre provides activities such as pony trekking, mountain trails, lakeside rides or cross-country treks.

== Religion ==
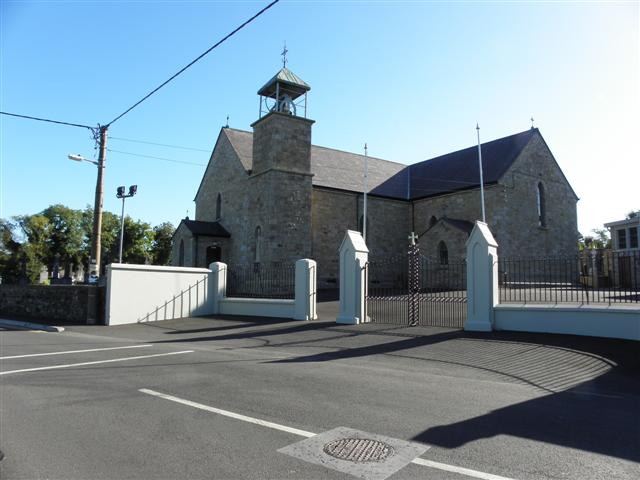
St Patrick's RC Church, Drumshanbo

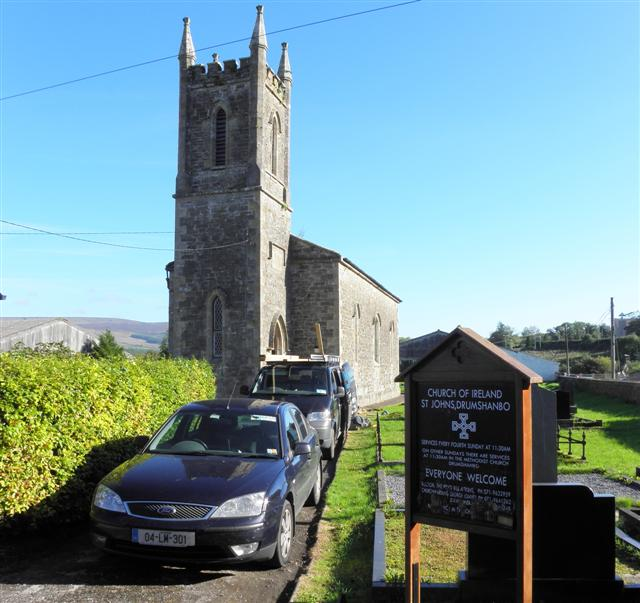
St John's Church of Ireland, Drumshanbo

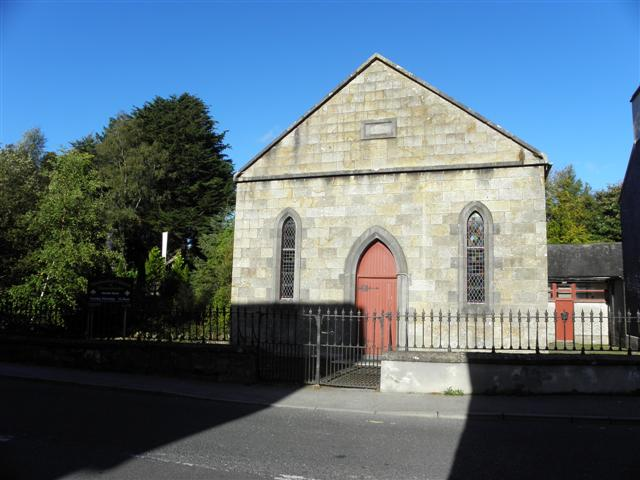
Drumshanbo Methodist Church

Drumshanbo has three churches and a convent.

Drumshanbo's main Roman Catholic church, built c. 1880, is dedicated to Saint Patrick. The church commemorates Patrick's first crossing of the Shannon nearby. An earlier church stood on a site in the famine graveyard in 1744 further out of town.

The local Church of Ireland church is dedicated to Saint John and dates to 1829. It is a gothic style structure ornamented with a tower and pinnacles.

The present Methodist church, on the Carrick Road, was built in 1860. An earlier Methodist chapel dated back to the 1760s.

The Poor Clares convent in Drumshanbo (the Monastery of St Mary of the Angels) is located alongside Saint Patrick's Catholic church. The convent was established in December 1864. The order at the convent are Franciscan Poor Clares and observe strict enclosure, recite the Divine Office in choir and maintain Perpetual Adoration of the Blessed Sacrament. The nuns pray around the clock and as it is an enclosed order they never leave the convent except in the event of a medical emergency. The Drumshanbo nuns were the first religious house in Ireland to begin the practice of Perpetual Eucharistic Adoration.

== Education ==
Drumshanbo has both a large primary school and a vocational secondary school, which provide education for local children until the age of eighteen. Drumshanbo Vocational School was opened in 1964, with major extensions in 1985 and 2012.

== Events ==
In the third week of July, Drumshanbo hosts the Joe Mooney Summer School for traditional Irish music. This festival has been running since 1990 and attracts Irish music enthusiasts from all over the world. The festival is named for Joseph Mooney (1916-1988), who served as senator and county councillor and who was a founding member of Comhaltas Ceoltóirí Éireann.

An Tóstal festival in June also focuses on Irish music and culture. This festival was established nationwide in the 1950s by An Bord Fáilte as a tourist promotion to encourage emigrants home. Drumshanbo is the only location in Ireland where it has survived into the 21st century.

The Sliabh An Iarainn Walking Festival took place over two days in April 2015. There were two days of graded A, B, C walks for walkers of varying abilities.

== International relations ==
Drumshanbo is twinned with Locquirec in Brittany, France, and Emerson, Georgia, United States.

== Notable residents ==
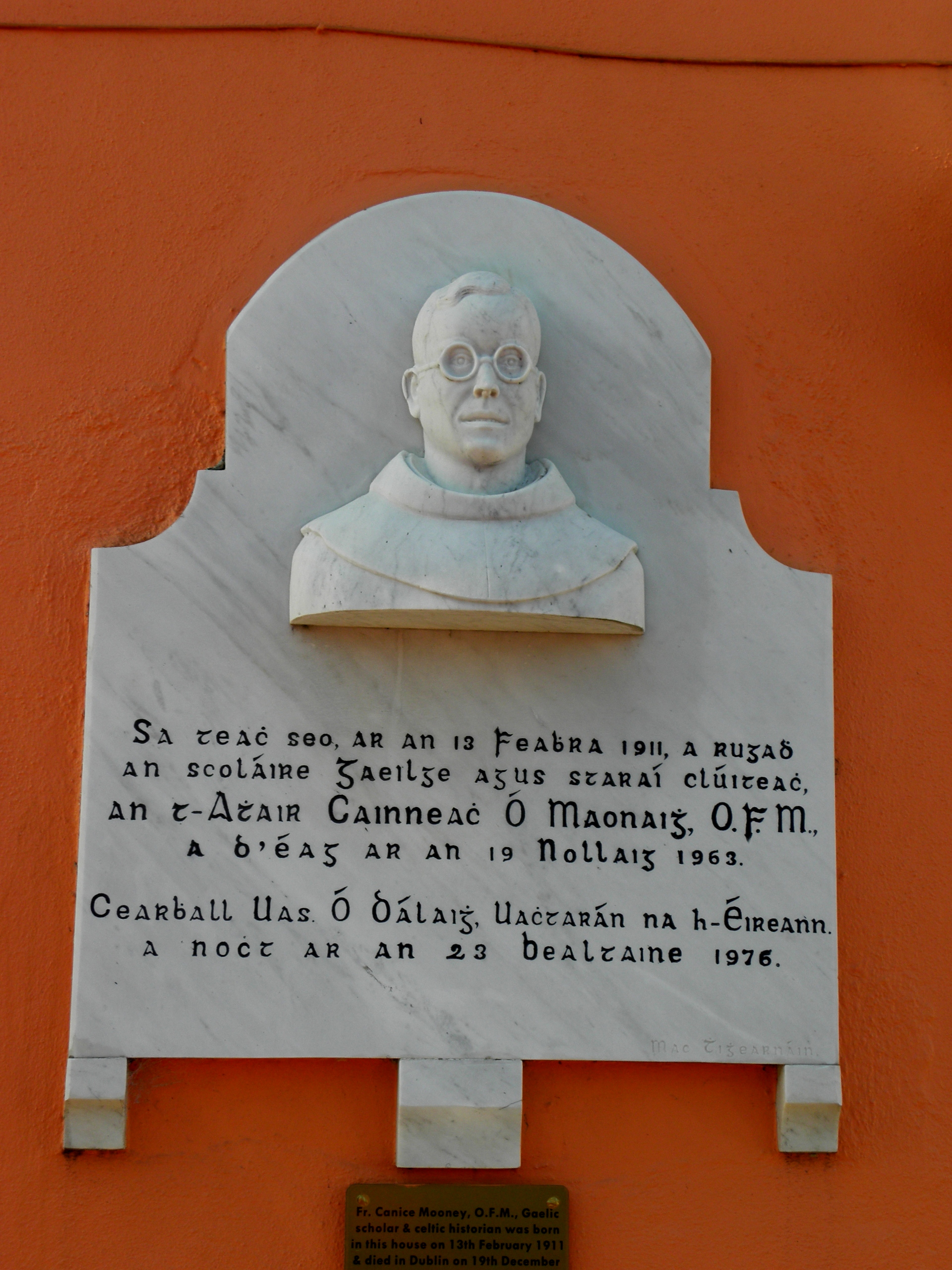
Canice Mooney bust, Drumshanbo

- Charlie McGettigan, the singer, songwriter and Eurovision winner, has been a Drumshanbo resident since 1973.
- Father Canice Mooney (1911-1963), a Franciscan nuascoláirí (new scholar), was born in Drumshanbo. An academic he wrote books on the Irish Franciscans.
