= Declan (given name) =

- Gender: Male
- Language: Irish

Origin
- Meaning: Man of Prayer or Full of Goodness
- Region of origin: Ireland

Other names
- Variant forms: Daclan, Declyn, Deklen, Deaglan, Dec, Dag, Lanny

Declan is an Irish given name, an anglicised form of the Irish saint name Declán, also Deaglán or Déaglán. St. Declán founded a monastery in Ireland in the 5th century, and the St. Declán's stone has been credited as the site of many miracles. The name is believed to mean "man of prayer" or "full of goodness".

The name appears in an ogham inscription documented by the Ogham in 3D project as part of the name ᚈᚓᚌᚐᚅᚅ ᚋᚐᚉ ᚇᚓᚌᚂᚐᚅᚅ (transliteration: TEGANN MAC DEGL/ANN ) or Tecán, son of Déclán, although a short vowel is used for the 'e' in Déclán.

== Notable people with the given name "Declan" include ==
=== A ===
- Declan Affley (1939–1985), Australian singer
- Declan Arthurs (1965–1987), Northern Irish soldier

=== B ===
- Declan Barron (born 1951), Irish Gaelic footballer
- Declan Bennett (born 1981), English singer-songwriter
- Declan Bonner (born 1965), Irish Gaelic footballer
- Declan Brady, Irish criminal
- Declan Breathnach (born 1958), Irish politician
- Declan Bree (born 1951), Irish politician
- Declan Browne (born 1978), Irish Gaelic footballer
- Declan Buckley, Irish television personality
- Declan Buckley (designer), British landscape designer
- Declan Burke (born 1972), British guitarist
- Declan Burns (born 1956), Irish canoeist

=== C ===
- Declan Carlile (born 2000), American ice hockey player
- Declan Carr (born 1965), Irish hurler
- Declan Carville (born 1989), Northern Irish footballer
- Declan Casey (born 2000), Australian rugby league footballer
- Declan Cassidy (born 1959), Irish film director
- Declan Chisholm (born 2000), Canadian ice hockey player
- Declan Costello (1926–2011), Irish politician
- Declan Coulter (born 1987/1988), Irish hurler
- Declan Cronin (born 1997), American baseball player
- Declan Cross (born 1993), Canadian football player
- Declan Curran (born 1952), Australian rugby union footballer
- Declan Curry (born 1971), Irish journalist
- Declan Cusack (born 1988), Irish rugby union footballer

=== D ===
- Declan Dale (born 1973), American filmmaker
- Declan Dalton (born 1997), Irish hurler
- Declan Danaher (born 1980), English rugby union player
- Declan Darcy (born 1970), Irish Gaelic footballer
- Declan de Barra (born 1960), Irish musician
- Declan Devine (born 1973), Northern Irish footballer
- Declan Donnellan (born 1953), British theatre director
- Declan Donnelly (born 1975), English television presenter
- Declan Doyle (born 1996), American football coach
- Declan Drysdale (born 1999), English footballer
- Declan Duffy (born 1975), Irish criminal
- Declan Dunn (born 2000), English footballer

=== E ===
- Declan Edge (born 1965), Malaysian footballer

=== F ===
- Declan Fanning (born 1979), Irish Gaelic footballer and hurler
- Declan Farmer (born 1997), American ice sledge hockey player
- Declan Feenan (born 1980), Irish playwright
- Declan Fitzpatrick (born 1983), Irish rugby union footballer
- Declan Flynn (1951–1982), Irish social figure
- Declan Fogarty (born 1960), Irish sportsperson
- Declan Fraser (born 2000), Australian auto racing driver
- Declan Frith (born 2002), English footballer

=== G ===
- Declan Galbraith (born 1991), English singer
- Declan Gallagher (born 1991), Scottish footballer
- Declan Ganley (born 1968), Irish businessman and political activist
- Declan Glass (born 2000), Scottish footballer
- Declan Goode (1913–1998), Irish hurler

=== H ===
- Declan Hannon (born 1992), Irish hurler
- Declan Harvey, British journalist
- Declan Hegarty (born 1992), Irish hammer thrower
- Declan Hill (born 1972), Canadian journalist
- Declan Hughes (disambiguation), multiple people
- Declan Hulme (born 1993), Irish novelist
- Declan Hutchings (born 2004), English footballer

=== J ===
- Declan James (born 1993), British squash player
- Declan John (born 1995), Welsh footballer
- Declan Jones (born 1995), British racing driver

=== K ===
- Declan Kearney (born 1964), Irish politician
- Declan Keilty (born 1995), Australian rules footballer
- Declan Kelly (disambiguation), multiple people
- Declan Kennedy (born 1934), Irish architect
- Declan Kiberd (born 1951), Irish writer and scholar
- Declan Kidney (born 1959), Irish rugby union coach

=== L ===
- Declan Michael Laird (born 1993), Scottish actor
- Declan Lally, Irish Gaelic footballer
- Declan Lambert (born 1998), Malaysian footballer
- Declan Lang (born 1950), English prelate
- Declan Lonergan (born 1969), Irish cyclist
- Declan Long (born 1950), Irish art critic and lecturer
- Declan Lovett (born 1944), Irish hurler
- Declan Lowney (born 1960), Irish film director
- Declan Lynch (born 1961), Irish columnist
- Declan Lynch (Gaelic footballer) (born 1992), Irish Gaelic footballer

=== M ===
- Declan Marmion (born 1961), Irish priest
- Declan Masterson, Irish musician
- Declan Maxwell (born 1980/1981), Irish Gaelic footballer
- Declan McAleer (born 1973), Irish politician
- Declan McCavana (born 1963), Northern Irish professor
- Declan McCullagh, American journalist
- Declan McDaid (born 1995), Scottish footballer
- Declan McDonnell (born 1948), Irish politician
- Declan McDonogh (born 1989), Irish jockey
- Declan McGonagle (born 1953), Irish art curator
- Declan McKenna (born 1998), British singer-songwriter
- Declan McLaughlin (born 2002), Irish hurler
- Declan McManus (born 1994), Scottish footballer
- Declan Meagher (1921–2019), Irish obstetrician
- Declan Meehan (disambiguation), multiple people
- Declan Meredith (born 1999), Australian rugby union footballer
- Declan Moore (disambiguation), multiple people
- Declan Morgan (born 1952), Northern Irish judge
- Declan Mountford (born 1997), Australian rules footballer
- Declan Mulholland (1932–1999), Irish actor
- Declan Mulligan (1938–2021), Irish singer-songwriter
- Declan Murphy (disambiguation), multiple people

=== N ===
- Declan Nash (born 1966), Irish sportsperson
- Declan Nerney (born 1959), Irish singer-songwriter

=== O ===
- Declan O'Brien (1965–2022), American writer and director
- Declan O'Brien (footballer) (born 1979), Irish footballer
- Declan O'Donnell (born 1990), New Zealand rugby sevens footballer
- Declan O'Keeffe (born 1972), Irish sportsperson
- Declan O'Loan (born 1951), Irish politician
- Declan O'Mahony, Irish Gaelic footballer
- Declan O'Meara (born 1970), Irish hurler
- Declan O'Rourke (born 1976), Irish singer-songwriter
- Declan O'Sullivan (born 1983), Irish sportsperson

=== P ===
- Declan Patton (born 1995), English rugby league footballer
- Declan Perkins (born 1975), English footballer
- Declan Pilkington (born 1969), Irish hurler
- Declan Power, Irish soldier
- Declan Prendergast (born 1981), Irish hurler

=== Q ===
- Declan Qualter, Irish hurler
- Declan Quigley, Irish broadcaster and journalist
- Declan Quill, Irish Gaelic footballer
- Declan Quinn (born 1957), American cinematographer

=== R ===
- Declan Recks, Irish film director
- Declan Rice (born 1999), English footballer
- Declan Roberts, English wheelchair rugby league footballer
- Declan Rooney (born 1983/1984), Irish Gaelic footballer
- Declan Rudd (born 1991), English footballer
- Declan Ruth (born 1976), Irish hurler
- Declan Ryan (disambiguation), multiple people

=== S ===
- Declan Shalvey (born 1982), Irish comic book artist
- Declan Sinnott (born 1950), Irish musician
- Declan Skura (born 2002), English footballer
- Declan Smith (born 1997), Welsh rugby union footballer

=== T ===
- Declan Thompson (born 2002), English footballer
- Declan Tingay (born 1999), Australian racewalker

=== W ===
- Declan Walsh (born 1989), Irish Gaelic footballer
- Declan Walsh (journalist) (born 1973/1974), Irish journalist

== Fictional characters ==
- Declan Macey, a character on the British soap opera Emmerdale
- Declan Mulqueen, a character portrayed by Richard Gere in The Jackal (1997 film)
- Declan Napier, a character on the Australian soap opera Neighbours
- Declan O'Callaghan, the male lead of Leap Year (2010 film)
- Declan O'Grady, a character played by Mark Mitchinson in an episode of The Brokenwood Mysteries
- Declan, a character played by Louis Ferreira in season five of the television series Breaking Bad
- Declan, a blue ground beetle in the Irish children’s television series Lu & the Bally Bunch

== See also ==
- Declan (disambiguation), a disambiguation page for "Declan"
