= Peter Conefrey =

Irish priest and cultural nationalist

Father Peter Conefrey PP
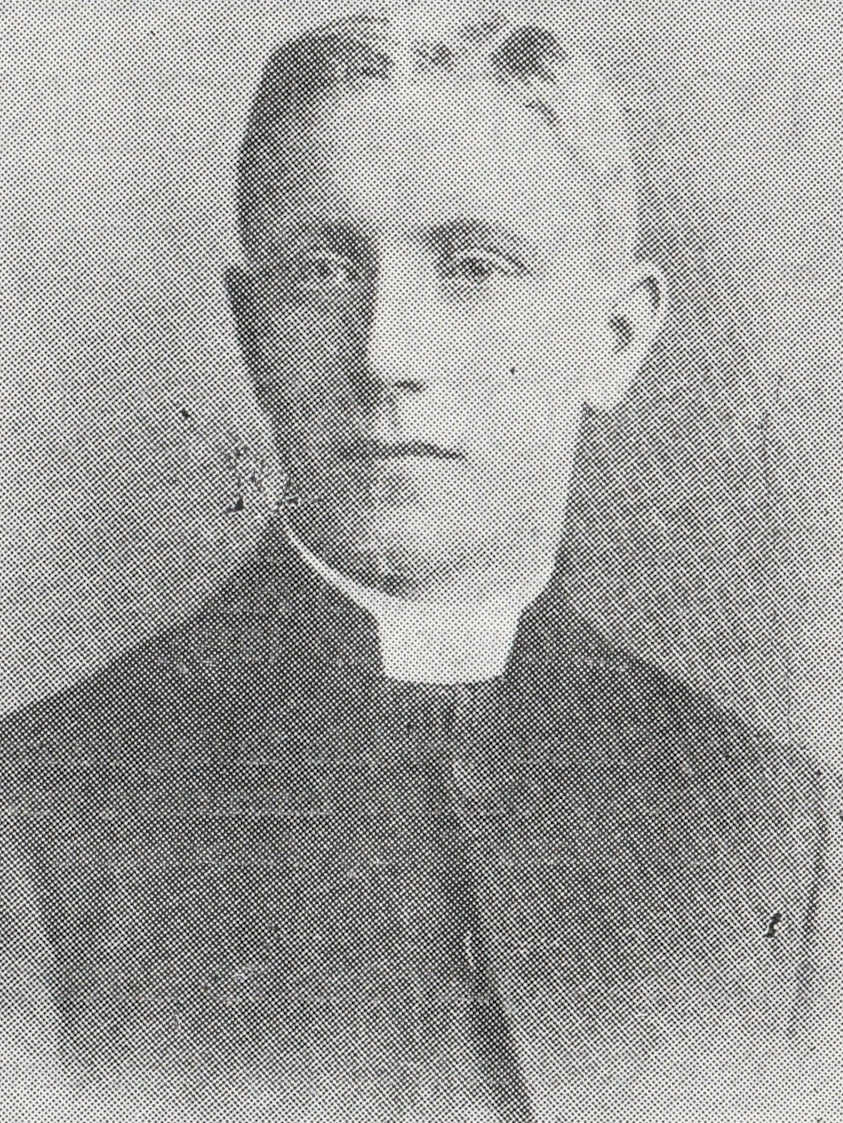
- Conefrey, circa 1910s
- Born: 1880
- Died: 1939 (aged 58–59)
- Occupation: Clergy
- Known for: Anti-jazz movement; Cloone Ceili Band

Peter Conefrey was the parish priest of Cloone, County Leitrim. An active cultural national activist he founded the Cloone Ceili Band and was leader of the Leitrim anti-jazz (Note: In the context of 1930s Ireland "Jazz" broadly encomposed many styles of non-native Irish dance brought back from America and elsewhere available via new 78rpm gramophone players.) campaign of 1934.

== Biography ==
Conefrey was born in Main street Mohill, County Leitrim, in 1880. His parents were James Conefrey and Mary McGivney. He was ordained a priest in 1906. During his formation for the priesthood at St Patrick's College, Maynooth his widowed mother was nearly evicted by the Earl of Leitrim which contributed to his anti-landlord stance.

Conefrey had a love of Irish traditional culture including language, music, and rural lifestyle; he was concerned about dilution from outside influences. As a curate in Killoe, County Longford, Conefrey organised households to use traditional spinning machines to weave cloth, at one point even taking 60 people with their equipment to exhibit at the Royal Dublin Society.

The Catholic Church in Ireland was very focused on sexual morality in the 1920s, 1930s and 1940s, with some advocating return to Gaelic language and traditional music to shield from amoral English language media. This aligned with Conefreys' views. County Leitrim being a focal point of the movement and 1933 seeing the violent protests against James Gralton and his dance hall with Gralton deported to the United States.

In 1926 Conefrey wrote in the Catholic Pictorial: "Jazz is an African word meaning the activity in public of something which St. Paul said 'Let it not be so much as named among you'. The dance and music with its abominable rhythm was borrowed from Central Africa by a gang of wealthy Bolshevists in the U.S.A to strike at Church civilisation throughout the world".

Conefrey is often credited with launching the anti-jazz campaign by organising a demonstration in Mohill on 1 January 1934, though it may have been a collaboration of several clergy who were members of the Gaelic League organisation. Several thousand marched in support. Speeches were presided over by Mohill's Canon Masterson who led with proclaiming Jazz was a threat to civilisation and religion in Ireland and to the only two aspects that had survived the 1691 Treaty of Limerick; "Irish music" and "Irish faith"; and any man defiling those was the worst form of traitor and a threat to the Irish nation. Support occurred from various leaders; head of state Éamon de Valera supported the aims of promoting Irish music and curtailing excessively late festivities while judiciously avoiding explicit condemnation of Jazz music. The event concluded with a Ceili dance.

Conefrey also called for legislation for dances to finish at 11pm. He claimed "Jazz" was a bigger problem than drunkenness or landlordism, and called on the main political parties, Fianna Fáil and Fine Gael, to set aside their differences and "Put down this Jazz".

In February 1934, Conefrey chaired a meeting of the South Leitrim Executive of the Gaelic League at Ballinamore and appeared to accuse the Gardai of involvement with the holding all-night Jazz dances with the accusation they had even held some dances since the commencement of the anti-Jazz campaign. Though Conefrey's anti-jazz campaign faded during 1934, it kindled debate that led to the Catholic Church lobbying the state to introduce the Public Dance Halls Act 1935, which restricted dances of all forms to 11pm and required public licenses for dances to be issued by a district judge. The act even affected traditional music, and gatherings of neighbours for Irish music sessions were also affected.

Conefrey died in 1939 and is buried at Farnaught Cemetery, Gortletteragh, to the east of Lough Rinn.

=== Music ===
Conefrey was responsible for forming the Cloone Ceili Band. Some recordings have survived of arrangements of ballads by Conefrey, sung by Joseph Maguire and accompanied by Paddy Killoran and his orchestra, including "My Willy O", and "The Blackbird of Sweet Avondale".

== Legacy ==
An annual "Down with Jazz" festival was begun in 2008 in Dublin, designed to respond humorously to Conefrey's campaign of the 1930s.
