= Hans Zollner =

German Jesuit priest and psychologist (born 1966)

The Reverend Doctor Hans Zollner SJ
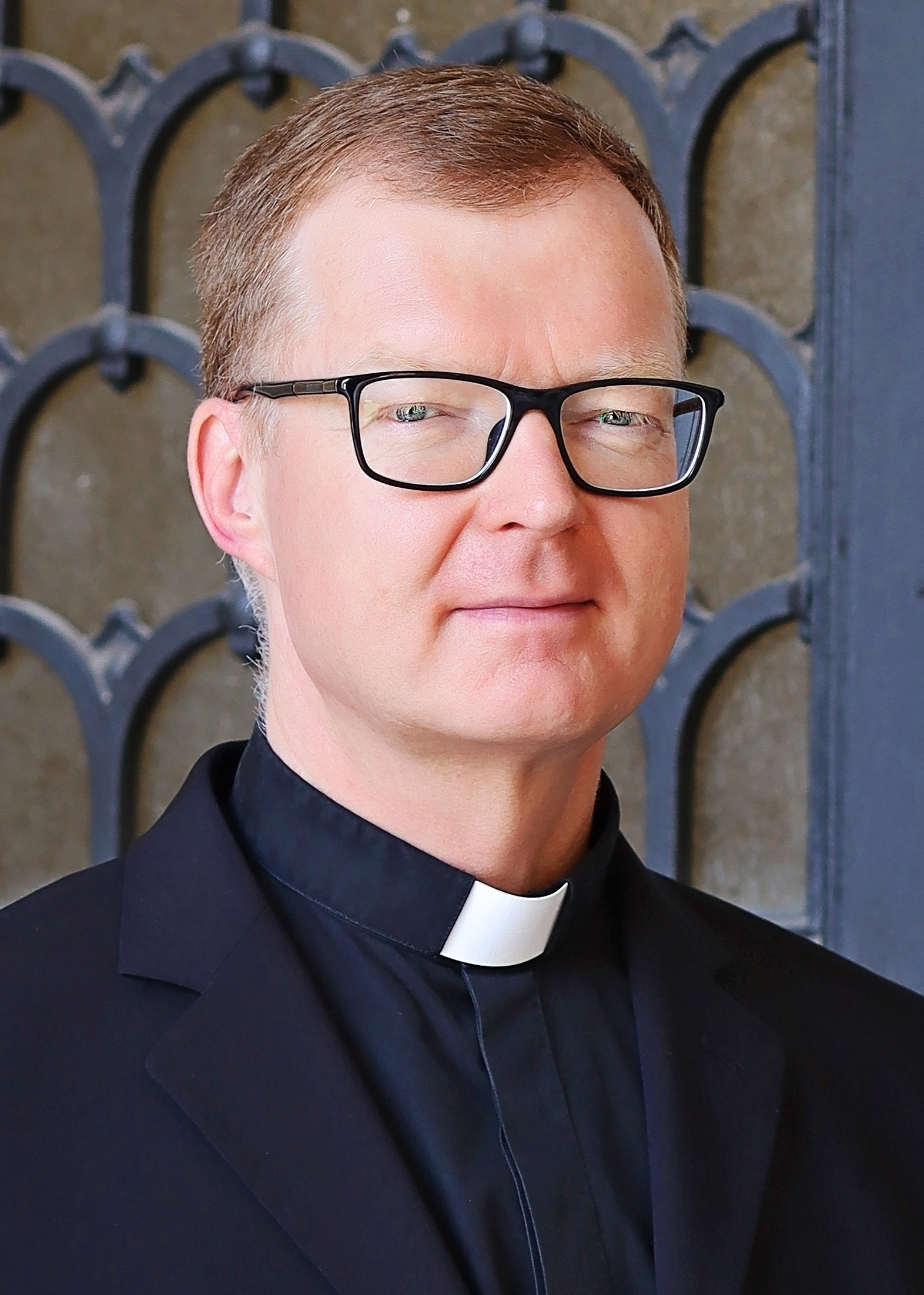
- Born: November 19, 1966 (age 59); Regensburg, West Germany
- Occupation: Professor

Academic work
- Discipline: Psychologist, psychotherapist, theologian
- Institutions: Pontifical Gregorian University, Rome
- Main interests: Safeguarding of minors; psychology and spirituality of religion
- Website: www.unigre.it/it/docenti/scheda/?id=1491

Hans Zollner SJ (born 19 November 1966) is a German Jesuit priest, theologian and psychologist, Professor at the Gregorian University, Director of its Institute of Anthropology. Interdisciplinary Studies on Human Dignity and Care (IADC) and one of the leading experts on safeguarding and prevention of sexual abuse.

== Life ==
Zollner was born in Regensburg, Germany, in 1966 and has been a member of the Jesuits since 1990. He studied philosophy and theology in Regensburg and Innsbruck. He completed his Doctorate in Theology at University of Innsbruck, and obtained a Licentiate in Psychology at the Institute of Psychology at the Pontifical Gregorian University in Rome. Zollner is a licensed psychotherapist.

Since 2003, he has taught at the Pontifical Gregorian University's Institute of Psychology. Zollner filled the roles of academic Vice Rector and Dean of the Institute of Psychology of the Gregorian from 2010 to 2019.

Zollner is regarded as one of the leading ecclesiastical experts in the field of safeguarding from sexual abuse, especially in the Catholic Church. He has been a member of the Pontifical Commission for the Protection of Minors since its creation in 2014 His membership was confirmed on 17 February 2018. He currently serves as Director of the Institute of Anthropology. Interdisciplinary Studies on Human Dignity and Care (IADC) at the Gregorian. The IADC began as the Centre for Child Protection (CCP), founded in Munich in January 2012 and moved to the Gregorian in February 2015. In 2010–2011 he was a member of the Scientific Working Group of the “Round Table on Child Abuse” commissioned by the Federal Government of Germany.

He is also Honorary Professor in the Department of Theology and Religion of the University of Durham (England). On 1 April 2017, Pope Francis appointed him as a consultor to the Congregation for the Clergy.

As of October 2020, he has visited 70 countries to address workshops and episcopal conferences on the need for developing awareness and establishing safeguarding measures. Hans Zollner views safeguarding minors as one of the main tasks the Catholic Church needs to have at heart.

In March 2023, Zollner resigned from the Pontifical Commission for the Protection of Minors, citing leadership issues and other concerns in a public letter. The commission's president, the American cardinal Seán Patrick O'Malley, had earlier cited different reasons for Zollner's resignation and, upon the publishing of Zollner's letter, issued a statement disputing his allegations.

== Publications and credentials ==
- Articles and books by Fr. Hans Zollner, SJ
- Curriculum Vitae of Fr. Hans Zollner, SJ
- Kindesschutzmaßnahmen und -konzepte auf Ebene der katholischen Ortskirche: Was passierte in der Weltkirche?
- The Child at the center: What Can Theology Say in the Face of the Scandals of Abuse?, in: Theological Studies 2019, Vol. 80(3), 692–710; DOI: 10.1177/0040563919856867
- voce “Abuso sessuale di minore”, in: P. BENANTI, F. COMPAGNONI, A. FUMAGALLI, G. PIANA (a cura di), Teologia morale (Dizionari San Paolo), Alba (CN) 2019, 5-13
- Formation of Priests: Assessing the Past, Reflecting on the Present, Imagining the Future, in: DECLAN MARMION, MICHAEL MULLANEY, SALVADOR RYAN (ed.), Models of Priestly Formation. Assessing the Past, Reflecting on the Present, and Imagining the Future, Collegeville/MI 2019, 163-177
  - en español: Formación de Sacerdotes: Evaluar el pasado, reflexionar sobre el presente, imaginar el futuro, in: Razón y Fe, t. 280, nº 1442, pp. 263–277
- Kirchenleitung und Kinderschutz. Theologie im Kontext des Kinderschutzgipfels 2019, in: MATTHIAS REMENYI, THOMAS SCHÄRTL (Hgg.), Nicht ausweichen: Theologie angesichts der Missbrauchskrise, Regensburg 2019, 189-200
- Prävention von Missbrauch Minderjähriger und Schutzbefohlener in der katholischen Kirche. Entwicklungen und Reflexionen, in: Erwachsenenbildung 66 (2020), n. 1, 4-7
- The Spiritual Wounds of Abuse, in: La Civiltà Cattolica - English Edition 1 (2017), 1, 16-26
  Other language versions available:
  - „Mein Gott, warum hast du mich verlassen?“ Spiritualität und der Umgang mit Missbrauch, in: Geist und Leben 90 (2017), 167-175
  - “Dios mío, ¿por qué me has abandonado?” Espiritualidad y manejo del abuso a menores, in: Razón y Fe, t. 275, nº 1422 (2017), pp. 323–333
  - “Meu Deus, Porque Me Abandonaste?” Espiritualidade e conduta perante o abuso, in: Brotéria, April 2017, vol. 184, pp. 497–511
  - «Ma mère, l’Église, m’a abandonné » Aspects spirituels de l’abus et de son déni, in: Christus, Avril 2017, n° 254, pp. 92–100
- Together with BETTINA BÖHM, JÖRG FEGERT, & HUBERT LIEBHARDT, Child Sexual Abuse in the Context of the Roman Catholic Church: A Review of Literature from 1981 to 2013, in: Journal of Child Sexual Abuse 23 (2014), 635–656; DOI:10.1080/10538712.2014.929607
- Together with CHARLES J. SCICLUNA & DAVID J. AYOTTE (eds.), Toward Healing and Renewal. The 2012 Symposium on the Sexual Abuse of Minors Held at the Pontifical Gregorian University. Editor, English Edition: Timothy J. Costello. New York/ Mahwah (NJ): Paulist Press, 2012 (published in 12 languages)
- Together with GIOVANNI CUCCI, Church and the Abuse of Minors, Anand/Gujarat (India): Gujarat Sahitya Prakash, 2013 (published in 9 languages)

=== Chair activities ===
- Chair of the Organizing Committee of the Symposium “Towards Healing and Renewal” on Sexual Abuse of Minors (Pontifical Gregorian University, 6–9 February 2012)
- Chair of the Steering Committee of the Congress “Child Dignity in the Digital World” (Pontifical Gregorian University, 3–6 October 2017)
- Coordinator of the Organizing Committee for the Meeting of Presidents of Bishops Conferences and Superior Generals on Child Protection (Vatican City, 21–24 February 2019)

=== Editorial activities ===
- Academic Editor for the review “Religions” (Basel/Switzerland)
- Member of the Scientific Committee of the review “Studia Moralia” (Accademica Alfonsiana/Rome)
- Member of the Scientific Committee of “Auribus” – Centro giuridico-canonico per i casi di abusi e violenza (Claretianum/Rome)
