= IADC =

The abbreviation IADC may stand for:

- Institute of Anthropology. Interdisciplinary Studies on Human Dignity and Care (IADC)
- Inter-Agency Space Debris Coordination Committee
- Inter-American Defense College
- Inter-American Democratic Charter
- International Advanced Database Conference
- International Association of Drilling Contractors
- "Inter-Agency Defense Command," on The New Adventures of Wonder Woman
- Internal Assessment and Documentation (Questionnaire)
- Induced After-Death Communication, based on EMDR, cf. Dr. Allan Botkin, American psychologist
