= Declan =

Declan may refer to:

- Declan Bennett, singer-songwriter, actor and playwright
- Declan Carlile, American hockey player
- Declan Donnelly, English television presenter, television producer, comedian, singer, rapper, actor
- Declan Doyle, American football coach
- Declan Duffy, Irish politician and convicted murderer
- Declan Galbraith, English singer-songwriter
  - Declan (album), 2002 album by Declan Galbraith
- Declan (given name), including a list of people with the name
- Declan John, Welsh football (soccer) player
- Declan Lynch, Irish columnist for the Sunday Independent newspaper
- Declan McKenna, English singer-songwriter known as Elvis Costello
- Declan Meredith, Australian rugby player
- Declan Nerney, Irish singer-songwriter
- Declán of Ardmore, 5th century Irish religious leader and Catholic saint
- Declan O'Rourke, Irish singer-songwriter
- Declan Quigley, Irish broadcaster and journalist
- Declan Rice, English football (soccer) player
- Declan Shalvey, Irish comics artist and writer
