= Cloone =

Village in County Leitrim, Ireland

Cloone An Chluain
- Village
- Location in Ireland
- Coordinates: 53°56′45″N 7°47′07″W
- Country: Ireland
- Province: Connacht
- County: County Leitrim
- Elevation: 73 m (240 ft)

Population (2006)
  - Urban: 600

Cloone (Irish: An Chluain) is a village in County Leitrim, Ireland. The village is located in the south of the county, just off the R201 road; its nearest town is Mohill. Its name is an anglicised version of the Irish-language word cluain, meaning 'meadow'. The village is in a townland and civil parish of the same name.

== History ==
The Justinian plague of Mohill barony badly affected the Cloone area in the 6th century. Bernard Kilrane who died in 1900 AD aged 111 years at Tawnymore near Cloone, was perhaps the oldest recorded Irishman. Throughout at least the 19th and 20th centuries, an impressive number of annual fairs were held at Cloone on - 12 February, 5 April, 26 May, 13 June (or 14th), 10 July, 26 August, 29 September, 2 November and 20 December.

Historian Guy Beiner has called attention to a curious apocryphal incident remembered in local folk memory, whereby it was believed that during the rebellion of 1798, the chains that were used by the insurgents to draw the cannons of the French invasion army led by General Humbert were allegedly stolen during a night stopover at Cloone and it was claimed that this theft resulted in the defeat of the rebels at the Battle of Ballinamuck. Local tradition has it that the French soldiers camped in a field in the centre of the village, still in existence, and known as the 'camp field'.

A monastery was founded at Cloone in 570, by Saint Fraoch. Stone archaeological evidence, including fragments of a celtic high cross and the monastery, have been found and placed on display in a local cemetery where the monastery used to be.

A Royal Irish Constabulary (RIC) barracks was occupied until 1920 in the village. The building that used to be the barracks was later demolished during the construction of the present day Catholic church.

Back in 1925, Cloone village comprised 22 houses, 7 being licensed to sell alcohol. In recent years housing stock has been added to by the creation of the local authority Lakeview Housing Estate at the centre of the village.

Village shops which have closed in recent times include Doherty's, Tiernan's and Mitchell's. A petrol pump used to exist in front of McKeon's Bar and Lounge. The village no longer has a post office.

=== World War I casualties from Cloone ===
A total of eleven men from Cloone Village and the surrounding area are known to have died whilst on active service during the Great War (1914–1918), having given the locality as their place of birth or permanent domicile at the time of their enlistment. Those bodies recovered and identified were interred in various military cemeteries administered by the Commonwealth War Graves Commission in Belgium (La Laiterie Military Cemetery), France (Cabaret-Rouge British Cemetery, Cuinchy Communal Cemetery, Philosophe British Cemetery & Savy British Cemetery), Israel (Beersheba War Cemetery) and Turkey (Lala Baba Cemetery). However, those men who lost their lives at the Battle of the Somme with no known graves have their names recorded on the 'Thiepval Memorial to the Missing of the Somme' in France.

== Geography ==
Cloone is located in south Co Leitrim. It is in the Barony in Mohill and in the parish of Cloone. It is a small village with a population of 600 according to the 2006 census. Nearby urban areas include, among others, Mohill (7.6 km), Ballinamore (12.4 km) and Aughavas (7.6 km).

== Amenities ==
The village has two public houses, namely Creegans Pub & McKeons Bar and Lounge. It has a grocery shop called O'Higgins (to the side of which is a public telephone kiosk).

In 2013, the 'Bóthar Na Naomh' (translation: 'Saints Road') recreational, sports, heritage and nature trail was developed in the environs of Annaghmaconway lake. The facility is popular for various individual and organised activities for running, walking, horse riding, kayaking and fishing.

In 2020, 'Cloone Garden of Remembrance' was completed adjacent to the bell tower of St James's Church of Ireland. The garden contains information boards along a pathway about local history and a rest area with a water feature.

Keeldra lake is about 3 kilometres away from Cloone and has picnic tables and changing facilities for swimmers. Swimming lessons have been held there for many years during the summer months. The lake is also popular with divers and boating enthusiasts. In 2019, a walking trail was opened which encircles the lake.

Other amenities include a community centre, a Catholic church, a funeral director and a national school.

=== Events ===
Every year, on the August Bank Holiday Monday, Cloone Agricultural Show is held on the outskirts of the village, after originally being held on the grounds of the village primary school. Usually in the show there are displays of cattle, bouncy castles, rides, stalls, food, music and competitions. It was first held in 1988. The show was not held in 2020.

=== Buildings, structures and monuments ===
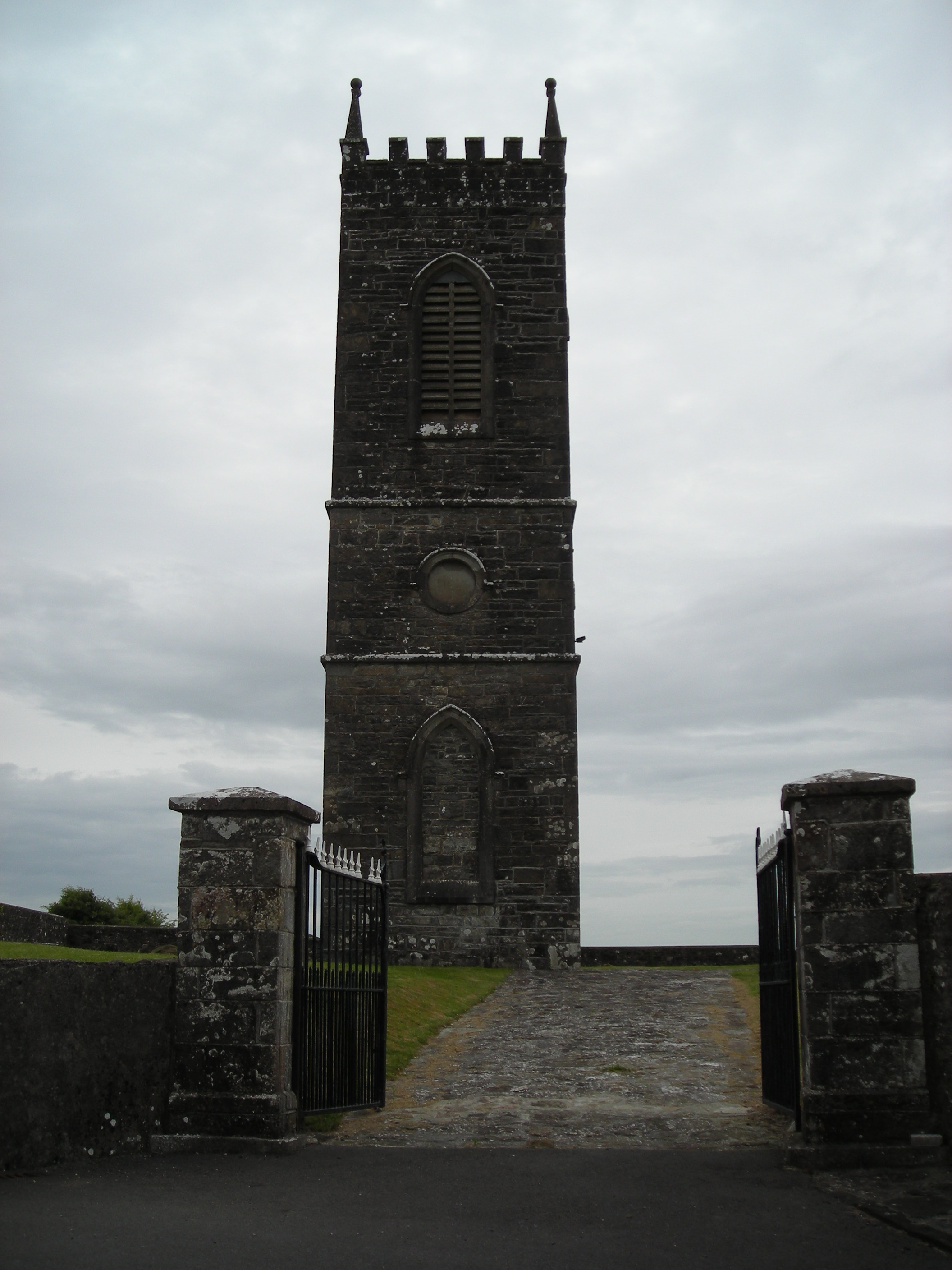
The bell tower of St James's Church of Ireland, Cloone, County Leitrim

Prominent building structures in the area include St Mary's Catholic Church (1971), the old Catholic church (1837) foundations in the older Catholic graveyard ground, and Fatima National School (1963).

A statue of the Virgin Mary (1993), and a monument (1983) to Irish cultural nationalist Fr. Peter Conefrey are prominently located in front of the entrances to the graveyards at the Cloone to Ballinamore road side of the village.

Cloone has participated in the Tidy Towns Competition, and a plaque has been erected, also at the Cloone to Ballinamore road side of the village commemorating its receipt in 1998 of an Endeavour Award.

In 1963 Fatima national school (building extended in 1999) replaced an older school (1903), which now stands empty also at the Cloone to Ballinamore road side of the village. Prior to the opening of the current community centre (1987), the old school acted as a location for community events such as school plays.

At the Mohill road side of the village there are two factory/industrial buildings (early 1980s).

The bell tower of St James's Church of Ireland is all that is left of a building that was erected by the Board of First Fruits in 1822. The tower was restored in the mid-1990s and a clock installed, which was manufactured by Samuel Elliott of Dublin. It is a local landmark and can be seen off the Cloone to Ballinamore Road.

Cloone formerly had a Garda station but it has closed and was sold in 2014.

== Sports ==
Cloone have a local GAA team who play Gaelic football and hurling. Their grounds (St. Marys, opened in 1980) are located approximately 1 kilometer outside the village, beside the Mohill road and comes equipped with a covered stand, sports lighting, electronic scoreboard and a gym. A tarmacked track encircles the playing field which has a variety of uses including running, walking or cycling. The club won eleven Leitrim Senior Football Championships, most recently in 1980.

== People ==
- Fr. Peter Conefrey, born in Mohill, was a prominent Irish cultural nationalist who was pastor of Cloone.
- Shane Kelly, successful horse racing jockey from Cloone.
- John McDonald, a 19th-century poet who was born in Cloone parish.
- Pat Quinn, founder of Quinnsworth (now Tesco Ireland), was from Cloone.

== See also ==
- List of towns and villages in Ireland
- Cluain Conmaicne
