= John McDonald (poet) =

Irish poet

John McDonald (of Dromod)
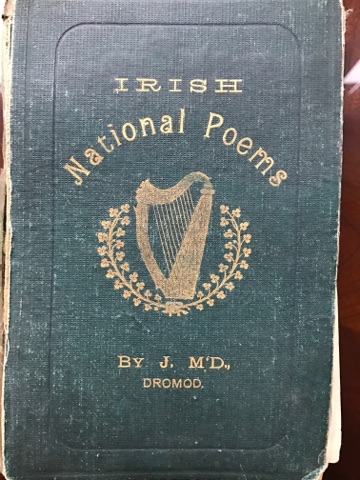
- Front Cover, Irish National Poems, 1886
- Born: 19 September 1846; Cloone, County Leitrim, Ireland
- Died: Oct 29th 1932; Cloonboniagh South, Dromod, Leitrim, Ireland
- Occupations: Poet, farmer, schoolteacher
- Writing career
- Pen name: J Mc.D (of Dromod)
- Language: English
- Period: 19th century
- Genre: Poems
- Subject: Irish nation
- Notable work: Irish National Poems

John McDonald (19 September 1846 – 1932) was an Irish cultural nationalist poet during the nineteenth century Irish Literary Revival. Known for frequent contributions to weekly and periodical Irish publications, he published a book of poetry in 1886.

== Biography ==
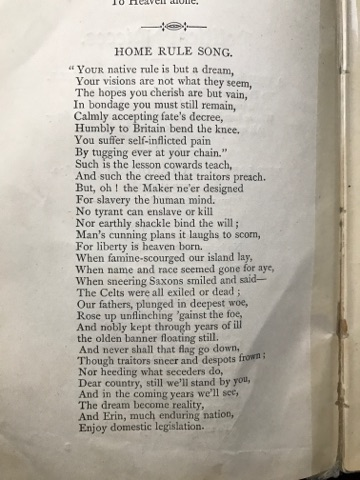
JMcD Dromod, Home Rule Song, 1886, poem

Born in the parish of Cloone in county Leitrim, John was the son of a small farmer and Roman Catholic. He completed his education in local schools before pursuing a teaching career. From 1881, he lived in New York for a few years. McDonald married his wife Mary c. 1886, and they raised eight children, named Michael, Patrick, Mary, John, Anne, Charles, and two unknown. The family lived at Cloonboniagh South townland near Dromod in county Leitrim, John running a farm whilst holding down a job as schoolteacher in county Longford. He died October 1932, and many of his children emigrated to America.

== Poetry ==
An Irish cultural nationalist, McDonald contributed verse to periodicals such as "United Ireland", "Weekly News", "Young Ireland", "Weekly National Press (1891–2)", and to local newspapers in county Leitrim and county Longford. While living in America for a time, he published poetry in the "Irish World of New York". McDonald's sole book, a collection of poetry titled "Irish National Poems", was published in 1886. He wrote most of his poetry in his spare time, mainly at night or Sunday evenings, explaining his motivation thus-

- "I am, therefore, obliged to place my unpretending little work before the public "with all its faults". However, I trust my readers will bear in mind that my aim has ever been to infuse hope and courage into the hearts and minds of my countrymen, and to hasten, as far as in my power lay, Ireland's deliverance, so that the good object the author had in view may outweigh the defects in the workmanship" J M'D. 1886.".

One copy of the book is kept at Keenans Hotel -Tarmonbarry in county Roscommon, and another copy is kept in the archives of the National Library of Ireland in Dublin. Reprints of his poems appeared in the Leitrim Observer newspaper during the 1960s. All his poems usually appeared with the signature "J. McD. (Dromod)".

== Land League ==
McDonald was an Irish nationalist, supporting the Irish National Land League movement. Writing to John Devoy in 1881, John Sexton enthused "before I ever had the pleasure of meeting Mr McDonald, I knew him through my connection with the Dublin press, as a graceful and frank writer, both in prose and verse ... indeed I am aware that he has been a tower of strength to the Land League cause in Leitrim, his native county".

== List of works ==
- Irish National Poems, Dublin, Sealy, Bryers & Walker, 1886. Bound with green cloth, title and author appear in gilt on upper cover and a gilt harp and bunch of shamrock in centre, gilt title on spine.

== References and notes ==
=== Primary sources ===
- O'Donoghue, David James (1892). The Poets of Ireland: A Biographical Dictionary with Bibliographical Particulars (PDF).

=== Secondary sources ===
- Keenans. "Keenans Hotel, History".
- National Archives. "Census of Ireland 1911". The National Archives of Ireland.
- shanleykids.com (2011). "The Shanley Kids, John J. McDonald".
- Sexton, Thomas (1881). "Letter of introduction for John McDonald from Thomas Sexton to John Devoy, 1881 April 21". Letter to John Devoy. National Library of Ireland.

=== Further reading ===
- "Papers of John McDonald ("Dromod") mainly poems in his own hand or dictated and signed by him, with associated cuttings; a letter by Mc Donald to his daughter; A Land League circular and a letter of T. D. Sullivan to McDonald and a letter of Sullivan concerning McDonald's poems. 1886 – 20th c."
