= Declan Cassidy =

Irish film and television director, producer and TikTok micro-influencer

- Occupations: director and producer

Declan Cassidy is a director and producer in Irish film and television. He specialises on short films which have won multiple awards in film festivals around the world. This short format focus has seen him accrue over 20,000 followers to his account on the social media platform TikTok, under the username DeclanCreative. This following places Cassidy into the category of micro-influencer.

== Career ==
A founding member of the Irish Film and Television Academy (IFTA Awards), Cassidy began his film career in the documentary genre where his work includes War on Waste (2003), a documentary looking at vermiculture as a waste disposal alternative to landfill and The Crew Cut (2006), a documentary charting the voyage of the Irish Naval flagship L.E. Eithne on its voyage to South America.

In July 2008 his short film Whatever Turns You On premiered at the Galway Film Fleadh. Written and directed by Cassidy, it won eight awards at various film festivals, including Best Short Film at Florence International Film Festival Italy, Best Irish Short Film at the Kerry Film Festival and the Audience Award at Filmstock International Film Festival in Britain. When the film received the award for Best Short Short at the Oscar-qualifying Aspen Shortsfest it became one of a limited number of short films worldwide each year to be considered for the Academy Awards. More recently, the film has been viewed over 600,000 times on TikTok

Cassidy's television series, The House, commissioned by the Broadcasting Commission of Ireland, screened in 2009 on Dublin's community channel, DCTV. In 2010 his Irish Film Board funded short film Veronique featuring Martha Christie in the title role was released. It was followed up by The Bouquet, The Box and Spoon in 2011.

In 2012 Etihad Airways featured a collection of Cassidy's short films as part of their inflight entertainment. This included his newly released short film Wedding Planners.

In December 2014, following the death of homeless man Johnathan Corrie in an inner city doorway of Cassidy's native Dublin, the film maker released his short film Whatever Turns You On for viewing online in conjunction with Focus Ireland to raise funds for the charity.

This coincided with the death of his father, artist James Cassidy (1926–2014). Cassidy took a sabbatical from work to take care of his mother, Josephine, who had been diagnosed with Alzheimer's disease. Cassidy used the time that his mother attended a daycare centre to read Italian and Spanish at Trinity College Dublin and to write his debut novel. Pins and Needles was published in September 2017 and rose to number three on the best sellers chart at Dublin's landmark Hodges Figgis bookstore. Cassidy graduated from Trinity in 2020, in absentia, due to the COVID-19 pandemic, securing a Bachelor's degree with First Class Honours. Having contracted COVID-19 in March 2020, Cassidy was left suffering from anosmia. When neither his sense of smell nor taste had returned by the end of the year, he set up a Facebook support group, Tasteless Cuisine, and attracted both national and international media attention when he revealed that he was putting chilis into all of his food, including his morning porridge, in order to have some sensation whilst eating.

With his mother's disease having progressed to the point where she required full-time professional care, Cassidy re-engaged with the film and television industry, focussing on both directing and producing. He secured funding from the Broadcasting Commission of Ireland for Romancing Ireland, a six-part television series that focussed on the eating habits of five non-Irish national communities in Ireland that the 2016 census found to be in growth – Brazilian, French, Italian, Romanian and Spanish. The name of the series derived from the fact that all five countries are speakers of Romance languages. Cassidy went on to receive funding from the Broadcasting Commission of Ireland to produce and direct a number of television series including A Finglas Story, which, in three half-hour episodes, tells the story of the north Dublin neighbourhood where Cassidy grew up.

Cassidy's return to drama came in 2024 with the short film Displaced which, uniquely, found its cast and crew through the social media platform TikTok. The film won the Grand Prix at the Cap Spartel Film Festival and went on to win awards at festivals including the Polish International Film Festival. The recognition included Best Director awards at the Berlin Kiez Film Festival and Palermo International Film Festival.

In 2021 Cassidy founded EurAV European Audio Visual CLG, a Drogheda-based not-for-profit company that works to promote media literacy, climate action and social inclusion through community media provision and training. With Cassidy in the role of executive director, the organisation was awarded the Media Literacy Ireland Award for their work on a project aimed at helping senior citizens to gain digital literacy.

Under Cassidy's direction, the organisation is pioneering hybrid media - the provision of information, simultaneously, in article, audio and video formats to afford consumer choice - through its online platform theM1.

== Filmography ==
- War On Waste (documentary, 2003)
- The Crew Cut (documentary, 2006)
- Make It Stop (short film, 2007)
- Dancing Dublin (five episode television reality series, 2008)
- Whatever Turns You On (short film, 2008)
- The House (eight episode television drama series, 2009)
- I Hate That Smile (short film, 2010)
- Véronique (short film, 2010)
- The Bouquet (short film, 2011)
- The Box (short film, 2011)
- Spoon (short film, 2011)
- Wedding Planners (short film, 2012)
- Harriet (short film, 2014)
- Romancing Ireland (six-part television documentary series, 2022)
- A Finglas Story (three-part television documentary series, 2023)
- Home thought from abroad (six-part television documentary series, 2024)
- Displaced (short film, 2024)
- The Lone Stranger (documentary, 2024)
- The Climate Challenge (six-part television documentary series, 2025)
- Fusion Kitchen (six-part television documentary series, 2025)
- Garbage Collection (short animated film, 2025)

== Bibliography ==
- The Carbon in the Cabonara – Facing the carbon cost of Ireland's hunger for "la cucina italiana" (Thesis, 2020)
- Pins and Needles (Fiction, 2017)
