= Declan Kelly =

Declan Kelly may refer to:

- Declan Kelly (businessman), Irish-American business executive, entrepreneur, and philanthropist
- Declan Kelly (diplomat), Irish diplomat
- Declan Kelly (radio executive), Australian media executive
