= Tony Hayden =

Irish Gaelic footballer

Personal information
- Born: Bornacoola, County Leitrim, Ireland

Sport
- Sport: Gaelic football
- Position: Forward
Clubs
- Years: Club
- Bornacoola; Craobh Rua
Inter-county
- Years: County
- 1950s-1960s: Leitrim

Tony Hayden was a Gaelic footballer from County Leitrim, Ireland. Hayden represented his county and his province, Connacht, with distinction during his playing days, playing in two Railway Cup finals in 1954 and 1955. He was also a member of the Leitrim side which played in four Connacht SFC finals in a row between 1957 and 1960, but on each occasion, as in the inter-provincial competition, Hayden ended up on the losing side against the great Galway five-in-a-row men.

At club level Hayden captained his native Bornacoola to the Leitrim Senior Football Championship and league double in 1957. Three years previously, he was also victorious on the other side of the county border having helped Craobh Rua to the Sligo senior crown.

Hayden was picked at left half back on the Leitrim Team of the Millennium.
