= Declan Moore =

Declan Moore may refer to:

- Declan Moore (cricketer)
- Declan Moore (rugby union)
