= Declan Murphy =

Declan Murphy may refer to:

- Declan Murphy (Gaelic footballer) (born 1956), Irish Gaelic footballer
- Declan Murphy (jockey) (born c. 1966), Irish jockey
- Declan G. Murphy, a character in Law & Order:Special Victims Unit
- Declan G. Murphy, urologist
