= Declan Kelly (radio executive) =

Australian media executive

Declan Kelly is an Australian media executive. Kelly was General Manager of radio stations 6PR and 96FM. He is also a member of the Perth Glory FC Advisory Board.

Kelly won an Australian Commercial Radio Award for most popular Metropolitan Radio Manager in 2004.

He was General Manager of both 96FM and 6PR from 2000 to 2010.

He set up his own Radio consultancy DEK Media in 2011 and consulted various radio stations around Europe.

In May 2017 he joined TAB Radio to look after all commercial activities. TAB Radio broadcasts in Perth on 1206am and right around Western Australia via 34 various frequencies.

In March 2019 he joined SEN Sports Network and now looks after Sales/Sponsorships and is co-host of The TAB Touch Lounge Breakfast show on SEN 657am.
