= Declan Ryan =

Declan Ryan may refer to:

- Declan Ryan (chef) (born 1943), Irish chef
- Declan Ryan (hurler) (born 1968), Irish sports manager
