= County Leitrim =

County in Ireland

Coordinates: 54.117°N 8.000°W

County Leitrim Contae Liatroma
- County
- Coat of arms
- Nicknames: The Wild Rose County (Others)
- Interactive map of County Leitrim
- Country: Ireland
- Province: Connacht
- Region: Northern and Western
- Established: 1565–83
- County town: Carrick-on-Shannon

Government
  - Local authority: Leitrim County Council
  - Dáil constituency: Sligo–Leitrim
  - EP constituency: Midlands–North-West

Area
  - Total: 1,589 km^{2} (614 sq mi)
  - Rank: 26th
- Highest elevation (Truskmore SE Cairn): 631 m (2,070 ft)

Population (2022)
  - Total: 35,199
  - Rank: 32nd
  - Density: 22.15/km^{2} (57.37/sq mi)
- Time zone: UTC±0 (WET)
  - Summer (DST): UTC+1 (IST)
- Eircode routing keys: F91, N41 (primarily)
- Telephone area codes: 071 (primarily)
- ISO 3166 code: IE-LM
- Vehicle index mark code: LM
- Website: Official website

County Leitrim (/ˈliːtrəm/ LEE-trəm; Irish: Contae Liatroma) is a county in Ireland. It is in the province of Connacht and is part of the Northern and Western Region. It is named after the village of Leitrim. Leitrim County Council is the local authority for the county, which had a population of 35,199 according to the 2022 census.

The county was based on the Gaelic territory of West Breffny (Bréifne) as it existed in the 1580s.

== Geography ==
The island of Ireland, showing location of County Leitrim.

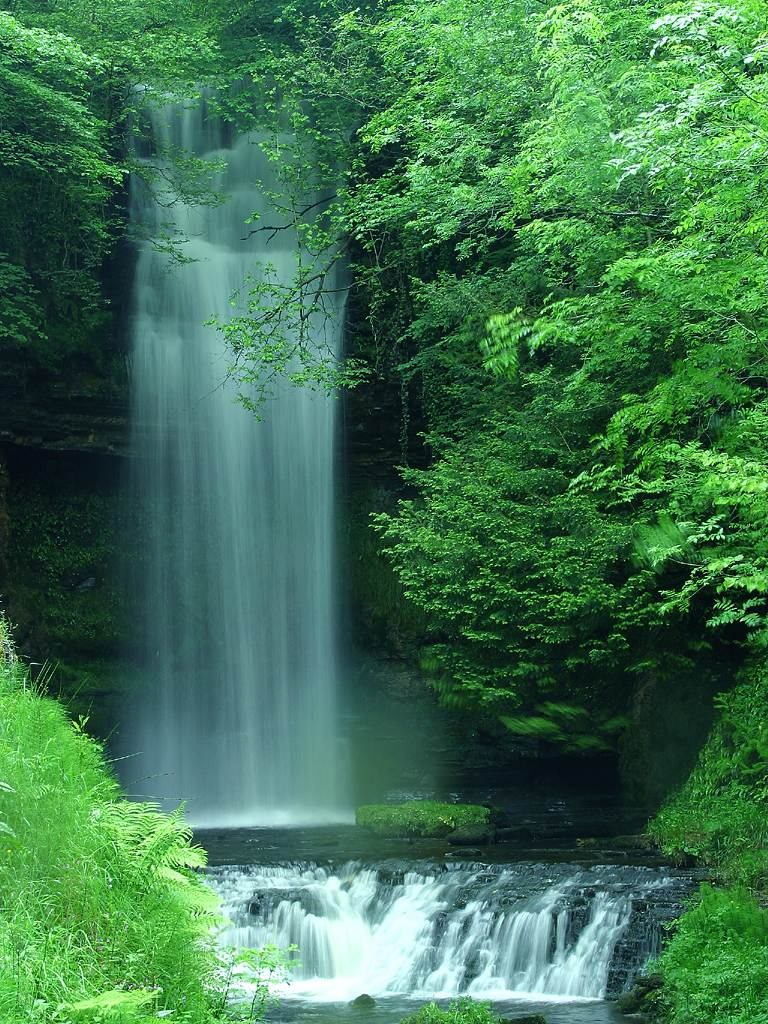
Glencar Waterfall at Glencar Lough

Leitrim is the 26th in size of the 32 counties by area (21st of the 26 counties of the Republic) and the smallest by population. It is the smallest of Connacht's five counties in both size and population. Leitrim is bordered by the counties of Donegal to the north, Fermanagh to the north-east, Cavan to the east, Longford to the south, Roscommon to the south-west and Sligo to the west. Fermanagh is in Northern Ireland while all the other neighbouring counties are within the Republic of Ireland.

Leitrim has a hilly and mountainous landscape in its northwest and is relatively flat in the southeast, each separated from the other by Lough Allen in the middle of the county. Leitrim has the shortest length of coastline of any Irish county that touches the sea. At Tullaghan, the coastline is only 4.7 kilometres (2.9 mi) long. The Shannon is linked to the Erne via the Shannon–Erne Waterway. Notable lakes include:

- Lough Melvin
- Lough Allen
- Lough Gill is to the northwest of Dromahair; Parke's Castle is located on the lakeshore.
- Belhavel Lough is also located in Dromahair, within the parish of Killargue.
- Lough Scur, and Saint John's Lough, on the Shannon–Erne Waterway.
- Glencar Lough which lies mostly in Leitrim is fed via Glencar waterfall made famous in the poem The Stolen Child by W. B. Yeats.
- Rockfield Lake, just east of Carrigallen in South Leitrim, is popular with anglers; while part of this lake is in County Leitrim, most of it is in County Cavan
- Other lakes include Upper Lough MacNean, Glenade Lough, Garadice Lough, Rinn Lough, Lough Scannal, Lough Erril and Lough Machugh.

== History ==
In ancient times Leitrim formed the western half of the Kingdom of Breifne. This region was long influenced by the O'Rourke family of Dromahair, whose heraldic lion occupies the official county shield to this day. Close ties initially existed with the O'Reilly clan in the eastern half of the kingdom, however, a split occurred in the 13th century and the kingdom was divided into East Breifne, now County Cavan, and West Breifne, now County Leitrim. The Normans invaded south Leitrim in the 13th century but were defeated at the Battle of Áth an Chip in 1270.

Much of the county was confiscated from its owners in 1620 and given to Villiers and Hamilton. Their initial objective was to plant the county with English settlers. However, this proved unsuccessful. English Deputy Sir John Perrot had ordered the legal establishment of "Leitrim County" a half-century prior, in 1565. Perrott also demarcated the current county borders around 1583.

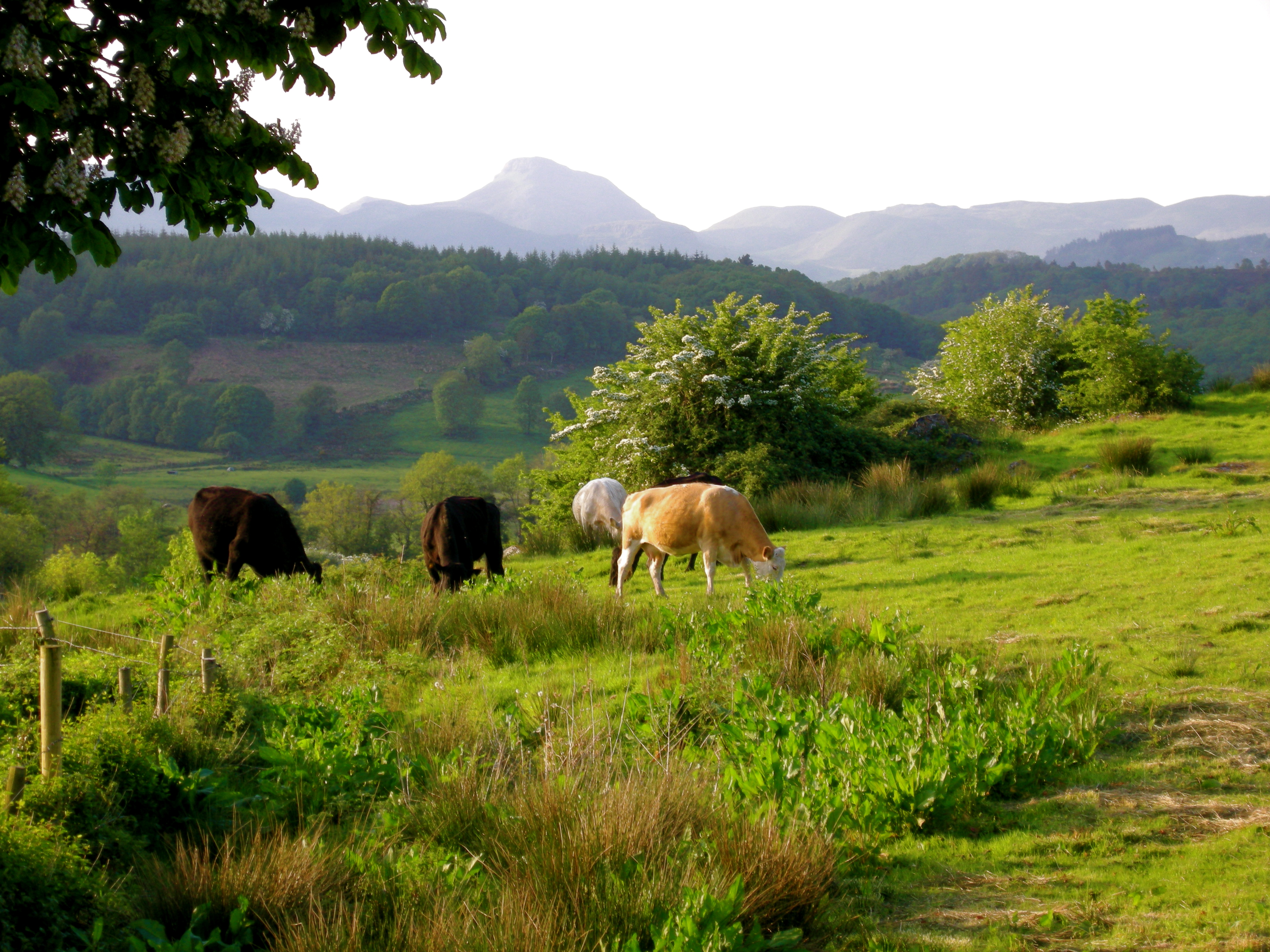
Leitrim countryside

Long ago Ireland was covered in woodland, and five great forests are traditionally said to have stood in Leitrim, with a 19th-century county survey stating- "a hundred years ago almost the whole country was one continued, undivided forest, so that from Drumshanbo to Drumkeeran, a distance of nine or ten miles, one could travel the whole way from tree to tree by branches". Many of these great forests were denuded for the making of charcoal for iron works around Sliabh an Iarainn. Working of the county's rich deposits of iron ore began in the 15th century and continued until the mid-18th century. Coal mining became prominent in the 19th century to the east of Lough Allen at Sliabh an Iarainn and also to the west in Arigna, on the Roscommon border. The last coal mine closed in July 1990 and there is now a visitor centre. Sandstone was also quarried in the Glenfarne region.

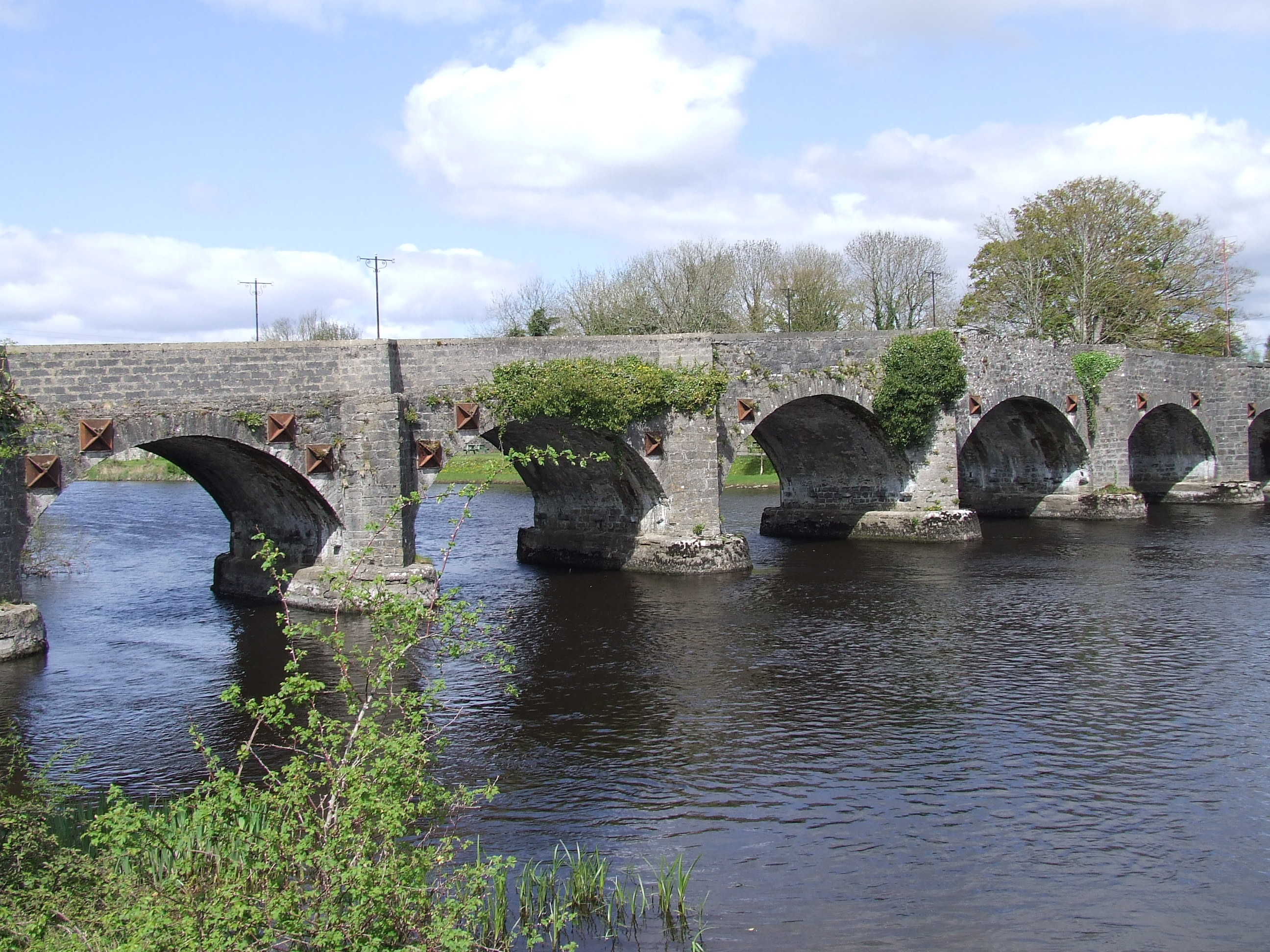
The Stone bridge at Drumsna that connects counties Leitrim and Roscommon.

Writing in 1791, the geographer Daniel Beaufort suggested the county housing population encompassed 10,026 homes with "upwards of 50,000 inhabitants", the primary agriculture being cattle production, and the growth of flax sustaining the linen industry. Leitrim was first hit by the recession caused by the mechanisation of linen weaving in the 1830s and its 155,000 residents (as of the 1841 census) were ravaged by the Great Famine and the population dropped to 112,000 by 1851. The population subsequently continued to decrease due to emigration. After many years, the wounds of such rapid population decline have finally started to heal. Agriculture improved over the last century. Leitrim now has the fastest growing population in Connacht.

The Book of Fenagh is the most famous medieval manuscript originating here. In the 19th century the poet John McDonald (of Dromod) lived in the county, and William Butler Yeats spent the turn of the twentieth century fascinated with Lough Allen and much of Leitrim. Glencar Waterfall, 11 kilometres (7 mi) from Manorhamilton, inspired Yeats and is mentioned in his poem The Stolen Child.

== Subdivisions ==
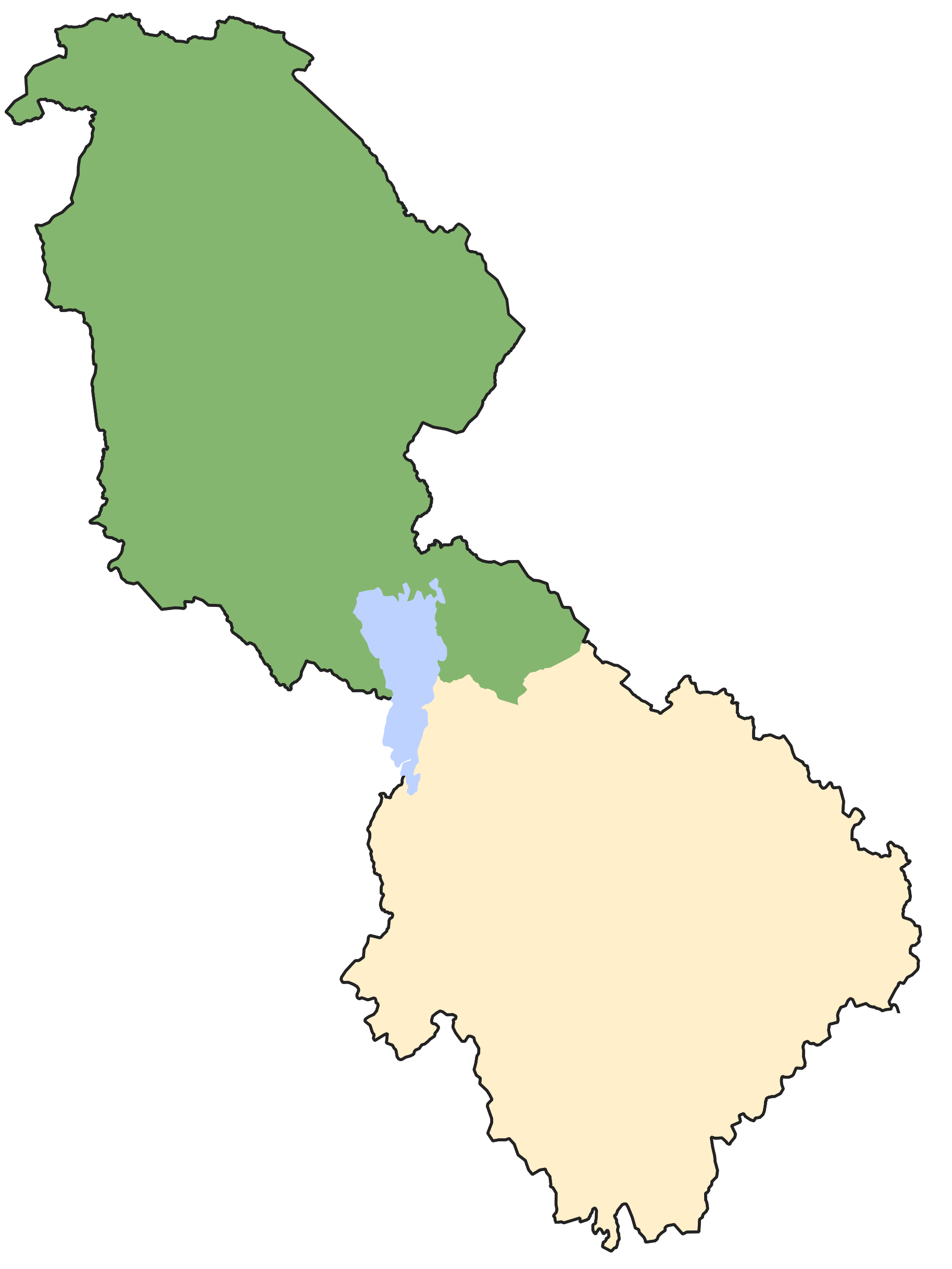
North and South Leitrim

Geographically, the county is almost evenly divided by Lough Allen (itself part of the River Shannon) and the River Shannon upstream from Lough Allen. While this boundary within the county runs from south to north, separating east from west in its immediate vicinity, the county extends much further north to the west of this line and much further south to the east, and the two parts of the county are commonly known as North Leitrim and South Leitrim, respectively. Uniquely among Irish counties, there is no way to cross from North Leitrim to South Leitrim as defined above (or vice versa) by road without leaving its boundaries. An alternative boundary between North and South Leitrim follows Sliabh an Iarainn east from Lough Allen rather than the River Shannon upstream from it, separating the baronies of Drumahaire to the north and Leitrim and Carrigallen to the south, as in the map in this section, although this boundary is crossed by a few roads including the regional R207 road. North Leitrim under at least one definition is slightly larger than the south, comprising 51% of County Leitrim's land area. However, South Leitrim, with towns such as Carrick-on-Shannon, Ballinamore and Drumshambo, is significantly more populous, containing approximately 65% of the county's population as of 2016.

=== Baronies ===
There are five historic baronies in the county. While baronies continue to be officially defined units, they are no longer used for many administrative purposes. Their official status is illustrated by Placenames Orders made since 2003, where official Irish names of baronies are listed under "Administrative units". They are Carrigallen, Drumahaire, Leitrim, Mohill and Rosclogher.

=== Rural districts ===
Under the Local Government (Ireland) Act 1898, County Leitrim was divided into the rural districts of Ballyshannon No. 3 (later renamed Kinlough), Bawnboy No. 2 (later renamed Ballinamore), Carrick-on-Shannon No. 1, Manorhamilton and Mohill. The rural districts were abolished in 1925.

=== Largest towns in County Leitrim ===
As of the 2022 census:

1. Carrick-on-Shannon*, 4,743 (A small part of Carrick-on-Shannon is in County Roscommon)
2. Manorhamilton, 1,667
3. Drumshanbo, 1,240
4. Kinlough, 1,196
5. Ballinamore, 1,112
6. Mohill, 1,027
7. Dromahair, 939
8. Roosky*, 787 (Most of Roosky is in County Roscommon)
9. Dromod, 753
10. Leitrim, 701

== Demographics ==
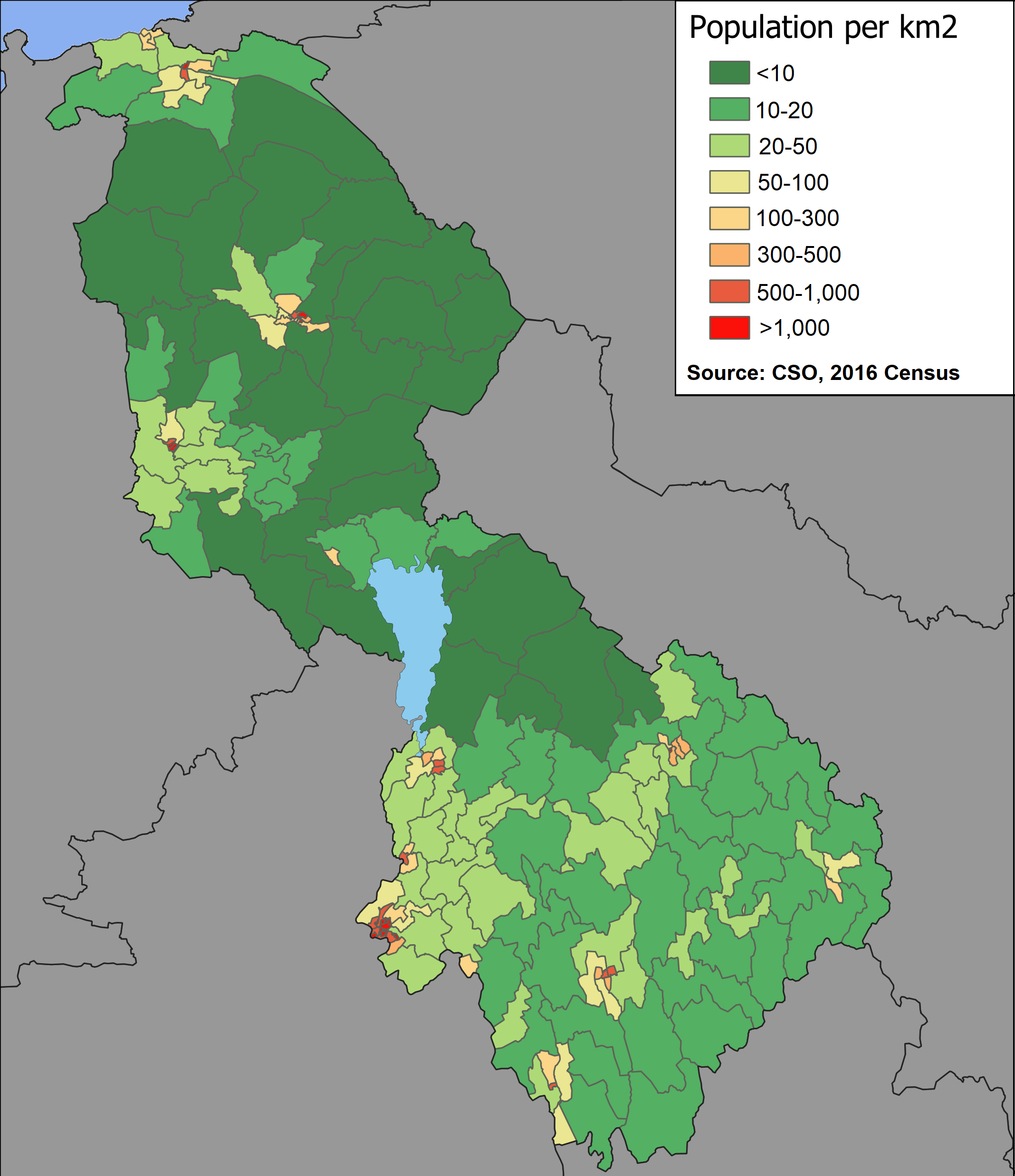
Leitrim is Ireland's most sparsely populated county

Historical population
Year	Pop.	±%
1500	2,511	—
1510	2,520	+0.4%
1550	2,544	+1.0%
1580	2,588	+1.7%
1585	2,603	+0.6%
1600	2,645	+1.6%
1610	2,663	+0.7%
1611	2,701	+1.4%
1613	2,744	+1.6%
1616	2,788	+1.6%
1621	2,819	+1.1%
1631	2,877	+2.1%
1641	2,901	+0.8%
1651	2,923	+0.8%
1653	2,970	+1.6%
1659	4,275	+43.9%
1668	4,550	+6.4%
1672	4,707	+3.5%
1680	4,999	+6.2%
1681	5,244	+4.9%
1686	5,779	+10.2%
1689	6,444	+11.5%
1690	6,999	+8.6%
1691	7,515	+7.4%
1693	7,999	+6.4%
1695	8,333	+4.2%
1696	8,970	+7.6%
1697	9,554	+6.5%
1699	10,224	+7.0%
1700	10,475	+2.5%
1703	10,976	+4.8%
1705	11,960	+9.0%
1708	12,880	+7.7%
1710	13,110	+1.8%
1715	13,575	+3.5%
1718	14,020	+3.3%
1720	14,445	+3.0%
1721	14,975	+3.7%
1725	16,100	+7.5%
1727	16,330	+1.4%
1730	17,055	+4.4%
1735	17,775	+4.2%
1736	19,550	+10.0%
1739	21,224	+8.6%
1737	23,920	+12.7%
1745	25,799	+7.9%
1755	28,950	+12.2%
1765	38,992	+34.7%
1771	37,801	−3.1%
1775	68,707	+81.8%
1781	94,201	+37.1%
1788	108,402	+15.1%
1790	116,804	+7.8%
1801	115,801	−0.9%
1811	120,783	+4.3%
1813	101,211	−16.2%
1821	124,783	+23.3%
1831	141,524	+13.4%
1841	155,297	+9.7%
1851	111,897	−27.9%
1861	104,744	−6.4%
1871	95,562	−8.8%
1881	90,372	−5.4%
1891	78,618	−13.0%
1901	69,343	−11.8%
1911	63,582	−8.3%
1926	55,907	−12.1%
1936	50,908	−8.9%
1946	44,591	−12.4%
1951	41,209	−7.6%
1956	37,056	−10.1%
1961	33,470	−9.7%
1966	30,572	−8.7%
1971	28,360	−7.2%
1979	27,844	−1.8%
1981	27,609	−0.8%
1986	27,035	−2.1%
1991	25,301	−6.4%
1996	25,057	−1.0%
2002	25,799	+3.0%
2006	28,950	+12.2%
2011	31,798	+9.8%
2016	32,044	+0.8%
2022	35,199	+9.8%

- Leitrim has the fastest-growing population of any county in Connacht. As measured by the census, the population rose by 36% between 2002 and 2022 to 35,087.
- 2005 HEA statistics identified that Leitrim has the highest rate of participation in higher education in Ireland with 75% of 17- to 19-year-olds being admitted to a higher course.
- The county town is Carrick-on-Shannon (population 4,062). It is a highly developed, prospering river port on the River Shannon and many tourists hire cruising boats here to explore the Shannon and the Shannon–Erne Waterway, which is a 63 km canal linking the two river systems. It is amongst the fastest growing towns in Ireland and has grown by 25% in the past few years.

== Local government and politics ==
Leitrim County Council is the local authority for the county. The county is divided into three local electoral areas, each of which is also a municipal district: Ballinamore (6 councillors), Carrick-on-Shannon (6 councillors), and Manorhamilton (6 councillors). Leitrim County Council has two representatives on the Northern and Western Regional Assembly.

=== 2024 seats summary ===
The following were elected at the 2024 Leitrim County Council election:

Party	Seats
Fianna Fáil	6
Independent	5
Sinn Féin	4
Fine Gael	3

=== National politics ===
Leitrim is part of the Dáil constituency of Sligo–Leitrim. This constituency existed from 1948 to 2007, and previously from 1923 to 1937 as Leitrim–Sligo. From 1937 to 1948, the county formed the Leitrim constituency. From 2007 until 2016, County Leitrim was divided between two constituencies: Roscommon–South Leitrim and Sligo–North Leitrim. This proved controversial, and at the 2007 general election there was no TD elected whose domicile was in the county. Sligo–Leitrim was recreated at the 2016 general election.

== Transport ==
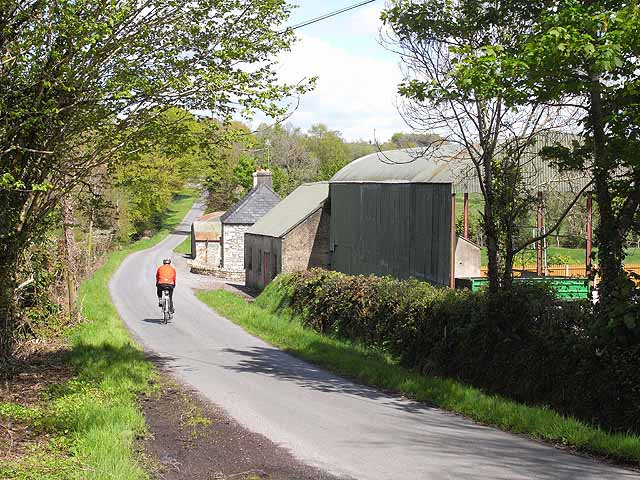
A typical country lane near Carrigallen.

- Supplementing the local and regional road networks are the N15 (Sligo-Leitrim-Donegal), N16 (Sligo-Leitrim-Enniskillen) and N4 (Sligo-Leitrim-Dublin) national roads.
- Railway stations in Leitrim on the Dublin to Sligo line include Dromod and Carrick-on-Shannon.
- The Cavan and Leitrim Railway opened on 17 October 1887. It consisted of two branches, meeting at Ballinamore which connected Dromod and Arigna with Belturbet. Services carried goods, passengers and coal from around Lough Allen. Although protested, the line finally closed on 31 March 1959. A revived heritage railway centre and transport museum with a running line has been based at Dromod since the 1990s.
- Railway stations in Leitrim on the former Sligo, Leitrim and Northern Counties Railway (which ran between Sligo and Enniskillen) included Dromahair, Manorhamilton and Glenfarne.
- The Shannon and Shannon–Erne Waterway give access to much of Leitrim by boat.

== People ==
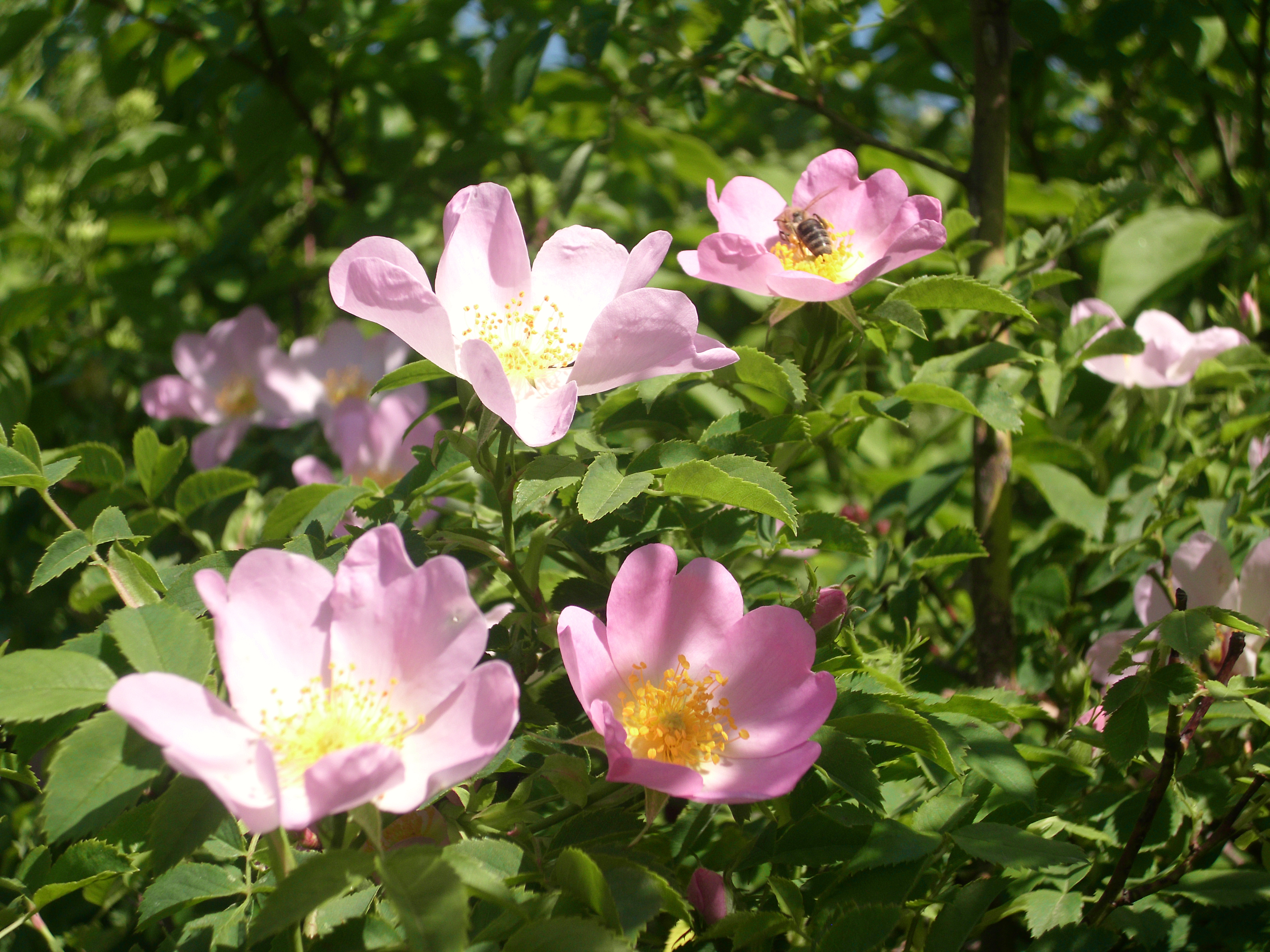
Wild roses (Rosa canina), one of the county's nicknames

=== 1400s ===
- Charles Reynolds (1496–1535) – posthumously attainted of treason for convincing the Pope to excommunicate Henry VIII.

=== 1600s ===
- Turlough O'Carolan (1670–1738) – harpist.

=== 1700s ===
- Robert Strawbridge (1732–1781) – American Methodist preacher born at Drumsna.

=== 1800s ===
- William Henry Drummond (1854–1907) – Mohill-born Canadian poet.
- Anthony Durnford (1830–1879) – Lieutenant-Colonel in British Army, served in Anglo-Zulu War.
- James Gralton (1886–1945) – Socialist activist and only Irish person ever deported from independent Ireland.
- Margaret Haughery (1813–1882) – philanthropist, Margaret of New Orleans, known as "the mother of the orphans".
- Thomas Heazle Parke (1857–1893) – doctor, explorer, soldier and naturalist.
- Charles Irwin (1824–1873) – Victoria Cross recipient.
- William Lendrim (1830–1891) – Victoria Cross recipient.
- Seán Mac Diarmada (1883–1916) – political activist and revolutionary leader executed following the 1916 Rising.
- John McDonald (1846–1911) – poet and nationalist.
- Patrick Rogan (1847–1912) – US Army soldier and Medal of Honor recipient.
- John Willoughby Crawford QC (1817–1875) – Lieutenant-Governor of Ontario.

=== 1900s ===
- Carole Coleman (b. 1966) – RTÉ broadcaster.
- Victor Costello (b. 1970) – rugby player and Olympian, former resident of Keshcarrigan.
- John Godley (1920–2006) – 3rd Baron Kilbracken.
- Tony Hayden – Gaelic footballer.
- James Kilfedder (1928–1995) – member of parliament for North Down.
- Charlie Lennon (1938–2024) – fiddler, pianist, and composer.
- Katherine Lynch (b. 1973) – comedian.
- Declan Maxwell (b. 1980/81) – Gaelic footballer.
- John McGahern (1934–2006) – author and novelist.
- Charlie McGettigan (b. 1950) – singer-songwriter and Eurovision winner; Drumshanbo resident since 1973.
- John Joe McGirl (1921–1988) – Sinn Féin TD and Chief of Staff of the Irish Republican Army.
- Patrick McGoohan (1928–2009) – actor.
- Paschal Mooney (b. 1947) – RTÉ broadcaster and senator.
- Colm O'Rourke (b. 1957) – Gaelic footballer and sports broadcaster, originally from Aughavas.
- Ray O'Rourke (b. 1947) – chairman and CEO of the construction multinational Laing O'Rourke.
- Pat Quinn (1935–2009) – founder of Quinnsworth, Ireland's first supermarket chain.
- Eleanor Shanley – singer.
- Paul Williams (b. 1964) – journalist.
- Gordon Wilson (1927–1995) – peace campaigner and senator.

== See also ==
- Muintir Eolais
- Kingdom of Breifne
- Lord Lieutenant of Leitrim

== References and notes ==
=== Secondary sources ===
==== Historical ====
- Boate, Gerard (1652). Irelands Natural History (Digitized 2009 ed.). Samuell Hartlib, For the Common Good of Ireland, and more especially, for the benefit of the Adventurers and Planters therein; Imprinted at London for John Wright at the Kings Head, in the Old Bayley. Archived from the original on 24 February 2017.
- Henry (1914). "Woods and Trees of Ireland". Journal of the County Louth Archaeological Society. Journal of the County Louth Archaeological Society Vol. 3, No. 3 (Dec) (3). County Louth Archaeological and History Society: 237–245. doi:10.2307/27728012. JSTOR 27728012.
- The Timber, Woollen, and Pottery Industries of Ireland, review of paper by G. P. Bevan. Vol. The Furniture Gazette, XVII-New Series (An illustrated weekly journal, January – June ed.). 74, 75, Great Queen Street, Lincoln's-Inn fields, London, W.C. 1882. Archived from the original on 5 March 2017.
- Beaufort, Daniel Augustus (1792). Memoir of a map of Ireland; illustrating the topography of that kingdom, and containing a short account of its present state, civil and ecclesiastical; with a complete index to the map (PDF). London, Faden, [etc.]
