= Declan Carville =

Northern Irish footballer

Declan Carville (born 13 December 1989) is a Northern Irish footballer who plays as a midfielder for Banbridge Town.

== Early life ==
As a youth player, Carville played for Orchard City and Bessbrook United.

== Football career ==
In 2015, Carville signed for Northern Irish lower league side Newry City, was regarded as an instrumental figure in the 2017/18 season, the season the club earned promotion to the Northern Irish top flight. In January 2019, he rejected offers from other top-flight clubs to stay at Newry City, but the club were relegated to the Northern Irish second tier that season. Later that year, he was released due to "breach of club discipline".

In 2019, he signed for Ballymena United in the Northern Irish top flight. That December, he played the last twenty-five minutes of a 0–2 loss to Coleraine as a goalkeeper before starting as goalkeeper again during the next match, a 0–1 loss to Glentoran. He made twenty-six appearances for the club and played in their Europa League qualifying rounds. In 2020, he returned to Northern Irish lower league club Newry City after leaving Ballymena United due to the travel issues and lack of consistent playing time. During the 2021/22 season, he helped the club earn promotion to the Northern Irish top flight again.

== GAA career ==
Besides football, Carville has played competitive GAA at senior level.

== Style of play ==
Carville mainly operates as a midfielder but has played as a striker.

== Personal life ==
Carville has two children.
