= Declan Moore (cricketer) =

Irish cricketer

Personal information
- Full name: Declan Martin Patrick Moore
- Born: 5 July 1975 (age 51); Dublin, Leinster, Ireland
- Batting: Right-handed
- Bowling: Right-arm medium

Domestic team information
- Years: Team
- 1996–1997: Ireland

Career statistics
Competition	First-class	List A
Matches	1	4
Runs scored	68	15
Batting average	34.00	3.75
100s/50s	–/1	–/–
Top score	51	10
Balls bowled	36	12
Wickets	0	–
Bowling average	–	–
5 wickets in innings	–	–
10 wickets in match	–	–
Best bowling	–	–
Catches/stumpings	1/–	1/–
- Source: Cricinfo, 28 October 2018

Declan Martin Patrick Moore (born 5 July 1975) is a former Irish first-class cricketer.

Moore was born in Dublin and played his club cricket for The Hills. Prior to playing first-class cricket, Moore held an amateur jockey license. He spent the winter of 1995 in New Zealand, where he played club cricket for Mount Manganui Cricket Club, and came close to selection for the Northern Districts. Returning to Ireland, he made his debut for Ireland in a List A one-day match against Gloucestershire in the 1996 Benson & Hedges Cup at Dublin, when he was called up as a late replacement for Uel Graham. The following week he played against Surrey in the competition at Eglinton, before following this up in June with another List A appearance against Sussex at Hove in the NatWest Trophy. In August 1996, he made his only appearance in first-class cricket for Ireland against Scotland at Linlithgow. In a drawn match, Moore batted twice, scoring 51 runs in Ireland's first-innings before being dismissed by James Govan, while in their second-innings he was dismissed by Mike Allingham. Across both of Scotland's innings, he also bowled six wicket-less overs. Moore made a final List A appearance for Ireland against Glamorgan at Cardiff in the 1997 NatWest Trophy. This was his last major appearance for Ireland. Moore struggled to make an impact in his four List A appearances for Ireland, scoring just 15 runs at a low average of 3.75, and a highest score of 10.
