= Institute of Anthropology: Interdisciplinary Studies on Human Dignity and Care =

Academic institution in Rome, Italy

Institute of Anthropology: Interdisciplinary Studies on Human Dignity and Care (CCPIADC)
- Established: 2012
- Religious affiliation: Roman Catholic
- Academic affiliations: Pontifical Gregorian University
- Director: Fr. Hans Zollner, SJ
- Location: Via del Seminario, 120, Rome, 00186, Italy
- Website: iadc.unigre.it

The Institute of Anthropology: Interdisciplinary Studies on Human Dignity and Care (IADC) is an academic institute at the Pontifical Gregorian University in Rome, Italy. The institute offers higher-education degrees in safeguarding and a doctorate in anthropology. The IADC has assumed the responsibilities of the Centre for Child Protection (CCP), which was launched in Munich in January 2012 by Pontifical Gregorian University's Institute of Psychology in cooperation with the Roman Catholic Archdiocese of Munich and Freising and the Department of Child and Adolescent Psychiatry and Psychotherapy of the University of Ulm.

== History ==
The institute began its activities on September 1, 2021. Its responsibilities and academic activities include those of the Centre for Child Protection. The IADC (then the CCP) was conceived in 2011, when IADC director Hans Zollner and Jörg M. Fegert (director of the Department of Child and Adolescent Psychiatry and Psychotherapy of the State University Clinic of Ulm) met during a meeting of the German government's Round Table on Child Sexual Abuse (convened in response to 2010 reports of clerical sexual abuse in Germany). The Archdiocese of Munich and Freising learned about the idea, and pledged its support. The project was understood as long-term, ongoing education in safeguarding. A three-year pilot phase was planned (January 2012 – December 2014), based in Munich, with a steering committee consisting of Zollner, Fegert, and Klaus Peter Franzl of the archdiocese. The institute (still the CCP) began its work with "Towards Healing and Renewal", a 2012 symposium. During the pilot phase, two conferences were organized to increase awareness of the CCP's work in safeguarding, to study the situation, and to present the state of the issue in the Catholic Church. The first conference, "Communication and Empowerment: Victims of Child Sexual Abuse", was held in Freising from October 30 to November 1, 2012; the second, "Learning from the Past: Implications for the Future", was held in Munich on November 7-8, 2013.

The IADC's primary project during its CCP years was the development of a multilingual online education program on the prevention of child sexual abuse for pastoral professionals. In 2014, it was decided to move the centre's headquarters to Rome. Since it was founded, it has been part of Pontifical Gregorian University.

== Structure and organization ==
Hans Zollner is the institute's director, and Peter Beer heads research and development of its educational programs. The office is staffed by an international, interdisciplinary team. A consultative committee develops the institute's activities. Composed of international ecclesiastical and non-ecclesiastical experts in research and practice, its members are Sheila Hollins (chair), Delphine Collin-Vezina, Gabriel Dy-Liacco, and Stephen Rossetti.

== Activities ==
The institute's mission is to safeguard the vulnerable with education to protect them from abuse in the Catholic Church and society as a whole, emphasizing research and academic formation and training. It also collaborates with an international academic network and doctoral students in a number of fields, including psychology, theology, spirituality, canon law, and the social sciences.

=== Educational programs ===
==== Blended learning ====
The institute offers multilingual, multicultural blended learning training and qualification at several levels of expertise (academic and non-academic) for pastoral professionals, church leaders, social workers, teachers, and university students. The program was developed in five languages: English, Italian, German, French, and Spanish. The institute has had partnerships in Argentina, Brazil, Canada, Chile, Colombia, Congo, Costa Rica, Dominican Republic, Ecuador, France, Germany, Ghana, Guatemala, India, Italy, Kenya, Mexico, Peru, Philippines, Scotland, Slovakia, Spain, Togo, Uruguay, and Zambia.

==== Diploma and licentiate in safeguarding ====
A diploma course, offered in Spanish and English, trains people involved in the field of safeguarding as officers, advisors, and collaborators in professional environments such as dioceses, religious congregations, and educational institutions. It provides training for future trainers in safeguarding in seminaries and schools.

The institute offers an interdisciplinary licentiate degree in safeguarding, a two-year program which prepares its graduates to handle safeguarding situations in theory and practice. Graduates manage safeguarding teams and develop culturally-tailored safeguarding measures for their professional environment.

==== Doctorate in anthropology ====
The institute's doctoral program educates specialists in the field of anthropology, with a focus on human dignity and the care of vulnerable people.

=== Publications ===
Publications by, or associated with, the institute include:

- Toward Healing and Renewal: The 2012 Symposium on the Sexual Abuse of Minors Held at the Pontifical Gregorian University
- "Child Sexual Abuse in the Context of the Roman Catholic Church: A Review of Literature from 1981–2013"
- "The Centre for Child Protection of the Gregorian University/Rome: First experiences, results and reflections in setting up a global e-learning program for the prevention of sexual abuse of minors"

=== Conferences ===
The institute organizes and participates in international conferences, congresses, and symposiums. The symposium "Towards Healing and Renewal", February 6–9, 2012, at Rome's Gregorian University, was attended by about 220 people: bishops, priests, religious, and laypeople with related experience, including victims, psychotherapists, and lawyers. In 2017, the CCP hosted a congress on "Child Dignity in the Digital World". Pope Francis addressed the congress, during which a declaration was written urging world leaders to do more to protect the privacy, dignity, and rights of minors in the digital world. From 2015 to 2018, the Centre for Child Protection hosted and co-organized annual Anglophone Safeguarding Conferences.
