= Declan Maxwell =

Irish Gaelic footballer

Personal information
- Born: Drumreilly, County Leitrim, Ireland

Sport
- Sport: Gaelic football
- Position: Forward
Club
- Years: Club
- Drumreilly
Inter-county
- Years: County
- 2003-2010: Leitrim
Inter-county titles
- All-Irelands: 0
- NFL: 0
- All Stars: 0

Declan Maxwell (1980 or 1981) is a former Gaelic footballer from County Leitrim, Ireland. Playing at both midfield and forward positions, Maxwell was a panel member of the Leitrim county football team from 2002. He won the Leitrim "County Player of the Year" in 2009.

He is a former member of the Drumreilly club, with whom he won the Leitrim Intermediate Football Championship in 2007. He moved to the Tara Gaels club in London in 2011, becoming unavailable for selection for Leitrim.
