= Martha Christie =

Martha Christie (born 1979) is an Australian model with a modelling career spanning more than twenty years. A trained violist at Melbourne Conservatorium of Music, she has also achieved success as a musician and an actress. While she was born and raised in Melbourne to Greek parents, It is in Europe that Martha has predominantly lived and worked since the age of 19.

== Modelling career ==
Martha has worked internationally for clients such as Coca-Cola and Tommy Hilfiger. She was also chosen to open the inaugural Supermodel Show in Dublin's Point Depot venue ahead of such models as Naomi Campbell, Heidi Klum and Gisele Bündchen. Martha has shared catwalks with models such as Tyra Banks, Helena Christensen, Christy Turlington and Jerry Hall. Her clients have included some of the biggest names in the world of fashion including Prada, Tiffany, Dolce & Gabbana, Victoria Beckham, Bobbi Brown and Karen Millen. She has featured in picture editorials for such magazines as GQ Magazine and Tatler.

== Acting career ==
Martha has been active in drama since her early schooldays but it was as a 10-year-old that she had her professional debut in the Australian production of Joseph and the Amazing Technicolor Dreamcoat at the Victorian State Theatre. Martha featured in several television commercials for such clients as Eircom (directed by Declan Lowney) and Volkswagen (directed by actor Hugh O'Connor). In 2008 Martha was cast in the lead role of the short film "88" which premiered in the Rhode Island Film Festival the same year. Martha was, again, cast in the lead role when she played "Veronique" in the Irish Film Board funded short black comedy of the same name. Martha took to the stage again when she played the lead role of Princess Jasmine in Theatreworx stage production of Aladdin in Dublin's Helix theatre.

== Music career ==
Building on her early training in viola and a strong background in musical theatre, Martha has continued to perform, write and record music. She has worked with music industry names such as Steve Mac, David Tench and Machopsycho. She and her band Dandelion supported Beirut at Dublin's Pod venue and performed at the international Electric Picnic music festival alongside such acts as Bryan Ferry and Massive attack.

== Celebrity ==
Martha was nominated for the title of "Sexiest Woman in Ireland" by Irish Tatler Man magazine, and has regularly featured in both broadcast and print media as a celebrity.
