= Declan Hughes =

Declan Hughes may refer to:

- Declan Hughes (snooker player) (born 1973), snooker player from Northern Ireland
- Declan Hughes (soccer) (born 2000), Australian footballer
- Declan Hughes (writer) (born 1963), Irish novelist, playwright and screenwriter
