= Declan Buckley (designer) =

British landscape designer

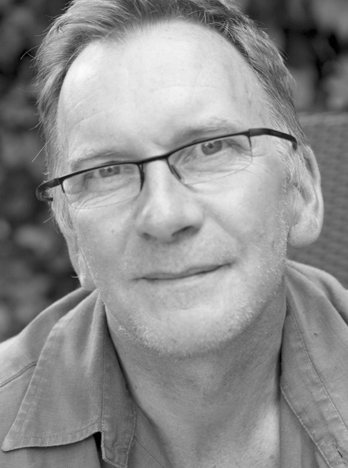
Declan Buckley

Declan Buckley is a garden and landscape designer whose work has been written about in the Evening Standard, The Daily Telegraph and The Independent. The Guardian mentions Buckley's talent for transforming dark urban spaces. He was a speaker at the 2009 Conference 'Heavenly Gardens in Hellish Places' at Imperial College London.

His garden design column 'The Urban Plot' appeared regularly in The Times. Images of his projects have been used to illustrate features in many books including Sharp Gardening by Christopher Holliday. His own garden was selected for the Modern Gardens Open Day on 26 June 2004, when 200 of Britain's most exciting private gardens were opened to the public. He designed the setting for The British Library 2004-2005 exhibition 'The Writer in the Garden', showing how gardens inspired authors and how authors in their turn shaped notions of the garden.
