= Declan Meehan =

Declan Meehan may refer to:

- Declan Meehan (radio presenter), Irish radio presenter
- Declan Meehan (Gaelic footballer) (born 1976), Irish Gaelic footballer
