= Declan Marmion =

Irish Marist priest and theologian

Declan Marmion SM (b. 1961) is an Irish Marist priest and theologian. He is currently Professor of Theology at St. Patrick’s College, Maynooth.

== Biography ==
Training as a Marist priest, he was educated at the University of Passau, Germany, and the Milltown Institute, Dublin. Marmion also studied at Heythrop College, University of London, All Hallows College, Dublin, Trinity College, Dublin and the Catholic University of Leuven, Belgium.

He lectured in theology at the Milltown Institute of Theology and Philosophy, before joining the staff of Maynooth College in 2013. He served as Dean of theology from 2015 to 2021.

Marmion has written on theology and the church, and contributed to many publications, and academic journals including Louvain Studies and Milltown Studies, and also written articles for the Irish Catholic and the Irish Times.

Marmion has been the chief editor of the Irish Theological Quarterly since 2013. He also serves as one of the series editor of Studies in Theology, Society and Culture, published by Peter Lang.

== Comments at funeral of Sean Fagan ==
At the funeral mass of his fellow Marist priest and theologian Fr Sean Fagan, Marmion spoke out against the church's treatment and censuring of Fagan, and the absence of Bishops from his funeral.

== Works ==
- A Spirituality of Everyday Faith by Declan Marmion, Eerdmans Publishing Company, (1998).
- Christian Identity in a Postmodern Age, Edited by Declan Marmion Veritas, Dublin, (2005).
- An Introduction to the Trinity by Declan Marmion and Rik Van Nieuwenhove, Cambridge University Press, (2010).
- Remembering the Reformation: Martin Luther and Catholic Theology, editors Declan Marmion, Salvador Ryan and Gesa E Thiessen, Fortress Press, (2017).
