= Declan Quigley =

Irish sports broadcaster

Declan Quigley is a broadcaster and journalist from Ireland.

== Career ==
He is the chief motorsport writer for the Irish Independent, Ireland's largest circulation daily newspaper, and has been the lead commentator for Setanta Sports TV's coverage of the Formula One world championship since 2005.

Quigley began commentating on cycle racing for Eurosport in 2013. He replaced David Harman who was on holiday. He has also been the pit lane reporter for RTÉ TV's coverage of Grand Prix racing from 1997 to 2004.

He is a keen amateur racer and has raced successfully in Formula Ford and Formula Vee.
