= Qualter =

Qualter is an Irish surname, meaning the son of Walter, a shortened form of McWalter/MacWalter. Notable people with the surname include:

- Danny Qualter (born 1992), Irish rugby player
- David Qualter (born 2002), Irish hurler
- Declan Qualter, Irish hurler
- Noel Qualter (born 1977), English magician
- P. J. Qualter (1943–2019), Irish hurler
- Séamus Qualter, (born 1967), Irish hurler

== See also ==
- Qualters
