= Noel Qualter =

English magician (born 1977)

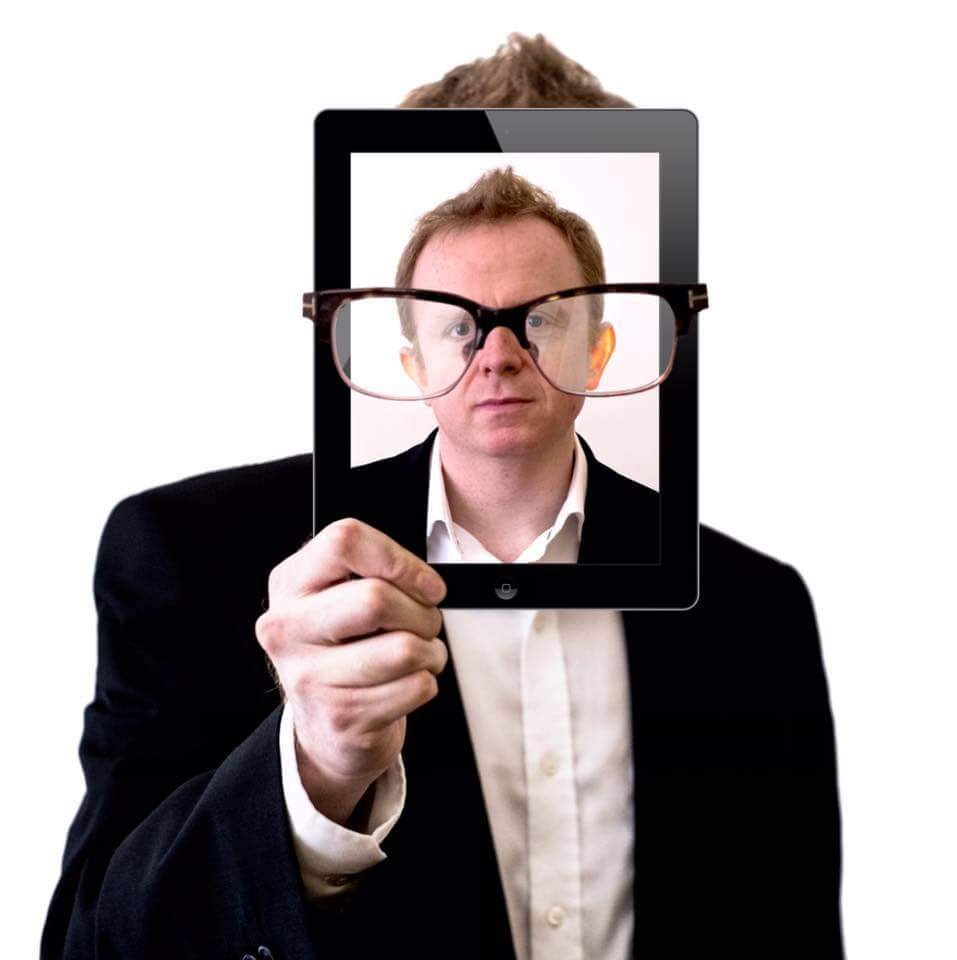
- Born: January 7, 1977 (age 49)
- Occupation: Magician
- Website: www.noelqualter.com

Noel Qualter is an English close up magician, magic creator and magic consultant. He is a member of the Inner Magic Circle (Gold Star).

He is known for the originality of his magic, being the only magician to win the Magic Circle Originality Award three times in succession, in 2014, 2015 and 2016. He also won the Cecil Lyle Award at the Magic Circle Awards 2018, and on 26 February 2021 he fooled Penn & Teller on episode 21 of series 7 of Penn & Teller: Fool Us. He has been featured on the cover of the March 2016 edition of the Magic Circle magazine, Magic Circular and published the trick Technote in the November 2015 Genii magazine. He is known for tricks such as iDeck, Alarmed and BLISS.

Qualter specialises in close up and iPad magic He came second in the Magic Circle Close Up competition in 2015, and performs for private and corporate events around the world. He debuted his stand up iPad magic show "Tech Tricks" at the Edinburgh International Magic Festival in 2017, has performed tech magic for CNET, and has appeared twice at the Magic Castle in Hollywood.

As a magic consultant he has worked with Objective on the CBBC shows "Help, My Supply Teacher's Magic" and “Help, My Supply Teacher’s Still Magic". He was also a magic consultant for the BBC3 show "Killer Magic", and the BBC1 show “Now You See It”. He was filmed for Season 1 of Penn and Teller's "Fool Us" in London in 2011, has appeared on BBC's The Apprentice and performed magic to accompany a report on Watchdog.

Qualter lectures regularly to magic societies around the UK and Europe. In recent years he has written and presented a live magic panel show "Never Mind The Buzzsaw" at magic conventions The Session and Blackpool Magic Convention, featuring appearances from magicians such as Paul Zenon, Joshua Jay, Andi Gladwin, John Archer and Etienne Pradier.

He is the cousin of Declan Qualter, hurler for Dublin GAA and St Vincents GAA.
