= National Irish Visual Arts Library =

Coordinates: 53.3433°N 6.2781°W

NIVAL (National Irish Visual Arts Library) is a public research resource which is dedicated to the documentation of twentieth- and twenty-first-century Irish visual art and design. It collects, stores and makes available for research documentation of Irish art and design in all media. NIVAL's collection policy encompasses Irish art and design from the entire island, Irish art and design abroad, and non-Irish artists and designers working in Ireland. NIVAL is sustained by material contributions from artists, arts organisations and arts workers. Information is also acquired from galleries, cultural institutions, critics, the art and design industries, and national and local authorities responsible for the visual arts. NIVAL is housed on the campus of the National College of Art and Design (NCAD) in Dublin.

== History ==
NIVAL was established in 1997 by Edward Murphy, a librarian at the National College of Art and Design for thirty-five years. The library's aim is to document all aspects of twentieth- and twenty-first century Irish art and design. Much of the material, amassed over a thirty-year period, is unavailable elsewhere. The collection includes files on all leading artists and designers of the period (including contemporary artists and designers), monographs, exhibition catalogues, price lists, brochures, press releases and newspaper reviews. Since its founding, NIVAL has received annual revenue subsidies from the Arts Council and project-development funding from the Department of Culture, Heritage and the Gaeltacht, the Arts Council of Northern Ireland, the Heritage Council and the UK's Design History Society.

== Main collection ==
The library's major components are books, journals and catalogues; ephemera files, and special collections. NIVAL's books, journals and catalogues are the most comprehensive collection of published titles pertaining to Irish art and design. There are more than 3,000 books and exhibition catalogues and about 60 journals, searchable on the NCAD's online library catalogue.

The ephemera files are a collection of printed documentation such as invitation cards, press releases, news clippings, brochures, and small-scale catalogues. File material is classified by artist, galleries, related subjects, and design.

NIVAL's special collections are over sixty groups of discrete archival material which originated from one source and are more useful to the researcher when kept together. They document an artist, arts organisation, art movement, or a combination thereof. Several collections are ongoing; these include the Artists’ Books Collection of hand-made, letterpress, and limited-edition books and the Posters Collection, which includes works by Irish artists and designers (and important designers who worked in Ireland). It includes vintage Aer Lingus and tourism posters, NCAD print-studio posters, and a variety of exhibition posters.

== Special collections ==
- 1913 Tapestry Lockout Project: research notes, sewing samples and preparatory drawings relating to the tapestry commemorating the centennial of the 1913 Dublin lock-out. SIPTU, NCAD and a number of community groups collaborated on the project, which was acquired in 2015.
- Aloysius O'Kelly Collection: Niamh O'Sullivan's research material on Irish impressionist painter Aloysius O'Kelly (1853–1925); acquired in 2013.
- Artists Association of Ireland: administration and financial records from the association (acquired 2011)
- The Artist Led Archive: a growing collection of documentation on the history of Irish artist-led cultural initiatives since 1970. The collection documents about 75 such initiatives and the cultural conditions influencing their development (acquired 2010).
- Artsource Records (Jobst Graeve donation): documentary material relating to the activities of the independent curatorial organisation since the mid-1990s (acquired 2003)
- Artworking: material on the Irish arts consulting organisation (acquired 2012)
- Artists' Books Collection: hand-made, letterpress, and limited-edition books created by artists born or living in Ireland (1997, ongoing)
- Brian Connolly Archive: artist's papers relating to public art commissions and digital images of performance work by Northern Irish sculptor Brian Connolly (acquired 2015)
- Brian Lalor Research Archive: an extensive collection of research materials compiled and edited by Lalor in preparation for his publication, Ink Stained Hands: Graphic Studio Dublin and the Origins of Fine-Art Printmaking in Ireland (acquired 2011)
- Brian K. Reilly Collection: sketchpads of drawings belonging to the Irish painter (acquired 2015)
- City Arts Centre Archive: administrative records, exhibition records and audio-visual documentation of centre activities compiled, organised and donated by former director Sandy Fitzgerald (acquired 2012)
- Cleo Collection: financial and administrative records of Cleo, a clothing shop on Kildare Street in Dublin which specialises in Irish knitwear and textiles (acquired 2010)
- Powers' Distillery Cooper's Stencils: stencils used by Powers coopers, who were previously located on the NCAD Thomas Street campus (acquired 1997)
- Cor Klaasen Collection: examples of Klaasen's graphic design, including a folio of prints displayed at the National Print Museum's 2005 retrospective exhibition. Donated to the library by Klaasen's widow in 2008.
- Cultural Relations Committee: 1949–1952 records of the Cultural Relations Committee, a body which advises the Department of Foreign Affairs (acquired 1998)
- Daniel Egan Collection: ledgers and scrapbooks documenting the activities of the Egan Gallery in the 1920s–1930s (acquired 1998)
- Daniel Maclise Collection: John Turpin's research material on Irish painter Daniel Maclise (1806–1870); acquired in 2015.
- Distillers Press: posters, prints and handmade books from the Distillers Press in NCAD's Visual Communications Department. Includes photographs and correspondence (acquired 2015)
- Dolmen Press: samples of printed material published by Dolmen Press (1951–1987), an Irish publisher specialising in hand-printed editions of poetry and art. Compiled by Dolmen Press co-founder Liam Miller (acquired 1997).
- Dorothy Walker Collection: criticism, correspondence and other documentation on Irish and international art from the 1970s–1990s, bequeathed to NIVAL by the critic and art historian (acquired 2004)
- Earley & Company Archives: designs and company records of Earley and Company, ecclesiastical furnishers with offices in Dublin from 1852 to 1974 (acquired 2002)
- Ed Miliano Collection': graphic design examples and illustration by the American born, Irish-based, artist and designer Ed Miliano (acquired 2014)
- Embroidery Artists Collection: paper documentation of Embroidery Artists group activities and lace and embroidery samples. The sewing samples were a teaching collection used by the NCAD's embroidery department (acquired 2009).
- Ernest Hayes Collection: material relating to Irish artist Ernest Hayes (1914–1978), donated by his family (acquired 2013)
- Evie Hone Collection: books and ephemera from the artist's library (acquired 1997)
- Fenderesky Gallery Image Collection: photographs and slides of exhibitions at the Belfast gallery from 1990 to 2013 (acquired 2014)
- Fionnan MacCollum: sketchbooks and correspondence relating to Irish sculptural designer Fionnan Og MacCollum (acquired 1997)
- Friends of the National Collections of Ireland: administrative records of the FNCI, a voluntary body founded in 1924 by Irish artist Sarah Purser to help preserve Ireland's artistic heritage when there was little (or no) state support for art collections in Ireland (acquired 2001)
- Gordon Lambert Collection: papers relating to the art collector (acquired 2015)
- Graphic Studio Dublin Archive: institutional archive of letters, catalogues, photographs and ephemera from the 1960 establishment of the studio to its 2010 acquisition
- Helen Moloney Archive': correspondence, preparatory artwork and photographs belonging to the Irish stained-glass artist (acquired 2011)
- Hibernia: artist Peter Haining's archive of a six-year project to document naive and auto-didactic art throughout Ireland. The archive includes sketchbooks, diaries, photographs, ephemera and a library amassed as Haining bicycled around the 32 counties (acquired 2011).
- Irish Exhibition of Living Art Archive (Anne Yeats donation): documentary material, including two volumes of press clippings, exhibition catalogues, visitors books and minutes, from the Irish Exhibition of Living Art (1947–1971); acquired 2001
- Irish Directions (Patricia Boylan papers): administrative records compiled by Boylan relating to Irish Directions, a travelling exhibition of Irish art at the Ulster Museum, the Hugh Lane Gallery and the Worcester Art Museum in 1974 (acquired 1997)
- Irish Patchwork Society Archive: administrative records and photographic documentation of the society's activities from 1979 to its 2013 acquisition
- Irish Trade Board: Fashion forecasts, mood boards and reports from the board, 1993—1999 (acquired 1999)
- Jan de Fouw Collection: examples of graphic design, including Aer Lingus posters (acquired 1998)
- John Hogan Collection: John Turpin's research material on the Irish sculptor (acquired 2003)
- Kevin Kavanagh Gallery Records: 20 years of administrative diaries and visitors’ books, donated by the gallery (acquired 2008–2010)
- Kilkenny Design Workshops Archive: records, press clippings and photographic documentation from the workshops, 1963–1989 (acquired 2001),
- Kilkenny Design Consultancy Archive: administrative records, correspondence, research material, design drawings and prototypes for graphic design and industrial design projects from the Kilkenny Design Workshops Design Consultancy, dating from the 1980s (acquired 2012–2015)
- Lillias Mitchell Collection: papers and research notes on the Irish artist and weaver (acquired 2009)
- Mainie Jellett Collection: documentary material on Jellet's life and work, including correspondence, sketchbooks and personal items (acquired 2007)
- Mia Cranwill Collection: collection documenting the Irish metalworker, including photographs, press cuttings and personal items (acquired 2000)
- Michael Healy Collection: a portion of the 1916 diary of the Irish stained-glass artist, in which he writes about the Easter 1916 Rising in Dublin.
- National College of Art & Design (NCAD) Records: NCAD student registers from 1877 to the 1970s; headmasters' reports, files and correspondence from 1907 documenting NCAD and its predecessor, the Dublin Metropolitan School of Art (acquired 1997)
- Odlums Flour Bags: examples of flour packaging from the company (acquired 2013)
- Oliver Sheppard Collection: Artist's sketchbooks, photographs, correspondence, drawings and small sculptures documenting the sculptor's work, donated by John Turpin (acquired 2003)
- Patrick Pollen Collection: drawings and sketches for stained-glass commissions by the British-born artist (acquired 2014)
- Patrick Scott Collection: books, papers and photographs belonging to the Irish abstract painter, bequeathed to NIVAL (acquired 2015)
- Paul Nietsche Collection: photographs of artworks and documentation relating to the Ukrainian-born artist, who lived and worked in Belfast (acquired 2004)
- Paul Peter Piech Collection': hand-printed material by the American graphic designer and printmaker (acquired 2014)
- Peter Grant (Institute of Sculptors of Ireland): artist's papers relating to the Irish sculptor and records of the Institute of Sculptors of Ireland, founded by Grant during the 1950s (acquired 1999)
- Pieter Sluis Collection: books and drawings by the Dutch graphic designer, who lived and worked in Ireland (acquired 2007)
- Posters Collection: ongoing collection of posters relating to Irish artists, designers, galleries and subjects, including 1950s Aer Lingus posters by Gus Melai and Jan de Fouw, NCAD print-studio posters and exhibition posters (begun 1997)
- Raymond Mintz Collection: artist's papers and photographs relating to the American painter, who moved to Ireland in 1969 (acquired 2004)
- Rosc '71 Collection: correspondence and other documentary materials relating to Rosc '71, donated by the estate of James Johnson Sweeney from 2005 to 2010
- Sculptors’ Society of Ireland: more than 900 SSI membership records (precursor to Visual Artists Ireland), with CVs, images and proposals for sculpture projects (acquired 2005)
- Society of Designers Ireland Records: administrative records of the SDI (precursor to the Institute of Designers in Ireland), including Design Week documentation (acquired 2007–08)
- State Art Collection (OPW): correspondence, documentation and images of Office of Public Works art in state buildings (acquired 2014)
- Sweepstakes Collection: advertising material from the Irish Sweepstakes, a 1930–1986 Irish Free State lottery to fund hospitals (acquired 2012)
- Sybil Connolly Collection: ephemera (mainly press clippings) acquired from the designer in 1999
- Temple Bar Gallery and Studios Archive: exhibition records and studio programmes from the contemporary-art venue from its 1983 establishment to 2000 (acquired 2008–2010)
- Theo Snoddy Archive: research and correspondence associated with the publication of Snoddy's 20th-century Dictionary of Irish Artists, including criticism, reviews and exhibition catalogues (acquired 2009)
- An Túr Gloine: David Caron's PhD research (including images) of the Dublin studio and its group of stained-glass artists from 1903 to 1944 (acquired 2015)
- Wallpaper Sample Books and Women's Magazines: three wallpaper-sample books and issues of British women's magazines dating from the late 1800s (acquired 2015)

== See also ==
- List of libraries in the Republic of Ireland
