= Patricia Horne =

Irish medical doctor

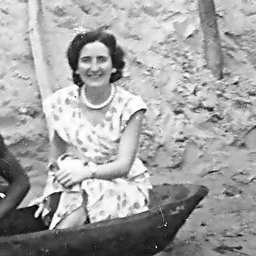
- in Nigeria in the 1950s
- Born: c. 1929
- Education: University College Dublin
- Known for: Overseas medical work

Patricia Horne (September 19, 1927 - October 29, 2012), was an Irish medical doctor who spent the beginning of her career working in Africa in Nigeria in the 1950s. She returned, responding to AIDS in Zambia, in the 1990s.

== Early life and education ==
Patricia Horne was born circa 1929 to Delia Moclair and Andrew Horne Jr, with her twin sister Margaret. Her grandfather was Andrew Horne, founder and first joint master of Holles Street maternity hospital. Her mother studied medicine at Queen’s College, Belfast and came to work in Holles Street. Her father was a Royal Army Medical Corps officer at Gallipoli before returning to Dublin and marrying Moclair in 1925. Horne grew up wanting to be a surgeon, and she and her sister went to the Ursulines secondary school in Waterford.

Horne went to study medicine in University College Dublin. While in college, Horne lead the UCD women's hockey team to Irish Senior Cup victory in 1951; the cup was not won by UCD again for 58 years. Horne graduated in 1955. Initially, Horne got a job working as a surgeon in Cashel, County Tipperary. In the early period for women as doctors in Ireland, they often found it easier to work in public health, and so, with her mother's experience behind her, Horne also completed a Diploma in Public Health.

== Overseas work ==
Horne wanted to work overseas and her father's experience at Gallipoli led him to want his daughter to work with nuns if she did so. She applied for government public health operations in Hong Kong, Africa and India but in 1957 went to work on a two-year contract to a missionary hospital in Nsukka, Nigeria. The hospital was run by the Holy Rosary Sisters. The country was just three years from achieving independence from Britain in 1960. The hospital was remote and struggling with no electricity or water, and both tuberculosis and yaws were endemic. Childbirth and obstetrics was a major part of Horne's work in the hospital. She was the only doctor in the hospital and worked every day. Some of the surgery methods used due to decisions made locally had strong arguments in their favour but have been controversial in other locations. After two years she left and returned home. A back injury forced Horne to give up surgery and she took up psychiatry and worked in Ireland until her retirement in 1994.

After retirement, Horne returned to work in Monze, Zambia, for the next six years. As the AIDS epidemic was the major crisis, the hospitals were dealing with malaria and AIDS-related TB.
