= Anne Rigney =

Irish artist

- Born: Tullamore, County Offaly, Ireland
- Education: Athlone Institute of Technology
- Style: Abstract
- Era: Contemporary
- Children: 2
- Website: annerigney.com

Anne Rigney is a contemporary Irish visual artist and sculptor.

== Biography ==
Born to parents Rita and Vincent, Anne Rigney is originally from Mount Temple, County Westmeath, but has made her home in Knockcroghery, County Roscommon.

Rigney studied at Athlone Institute of Technology, graduating in Art and Design. She cofounded professional artists' group Working Artists Roscommon and is a member of Visual Artists Ireland.

== Style of work ==
Rigney's work is influenced heavily by the area in which she lives and the rural Irish countryside in general, as well as her personal life experiences. The style of work is mainly abstract; the media she uses includes oil paint, watercolour, acrylics, mixed-media and found objects.

== Exhibitions and events ==
- Stay Gallery, Downey, Los Angeles, California.
- documenta X Fringe, Kassel, Germany
- Jagiellonian University, Kraków, Poland
- Kenny Gallery, Galway, Ireland
- United States Embassy, Dublin, Ireland
- ICONS Festival, Boston, Massachusetts, US.
- Crossroads Symposium, Roscommon, Ireland
- Dyehouse Gallery, Waterford, Ireland
- Roscommon Arts Centre, Roscommon, Ireland
- Basement Gallery, Dundalk, Ireland
- Wexford Arts Centre, Wexford, Ireland
- Celtic Links, Inverness, Scotland
- Mullingar Arts Centre, County Westmeath, Ireland

== Public collections ==
Rigney's works have been acquired by the following public art collections:

- Office of Public Works
- Athlone Institute of Technology
- Roscommon County Council
- Irish Distillers

== Awards, recognition and residencies ==
In the abstract Anne Rigney produces striking and provoking works

— Ian Wieczorek, Art critic, The Irish Times

- Arts Council Travel Award for cultural events in Kraków, Poland
- Residency at the Tyrone Guthrie Centre in Monaghan

== Activism ==
In early 2015 Anne Rigney campaigned publicly for same-sex marriage equality in the lead up to the referendum on the question held in Ireland that year, writing a poem and creating a video which was published on YouTube and the VoteWithUs.org website.

In July 2015 Rigney called for the Australian public to follow Ireland's lead and introduce equal marriage. The Daily Telegraph published an article by Rigney in October 2016 in which she appealed directly to Australian parents to support their gay children and campaign for equal marriage, writing "Talk to your politicians. Hold rallies. Write letters to papers. Do not stand idly by. Your children need you."
