= Delia Moclair =

Irish obstetrician

Delia Moclair Horne
- Born: Bridget Angela Moclair; 8 January 1895; John Street, Cashel, County Tipperary, Ireland
- Died: 23 November 1971 (aged 76); Dr Steevens' Hospital, Dublin

Delia Moclair (8 January 1895 – 23 November 1971) was an Irish obstetrician, and first woman assistant master of the National Maternity Hospital, Dublin.

== Early life ==
Delia Moclair was born Bridget Angela Moclair in John Street, Cashel, County Tipperary on 8 January 1895. She was the youngest of the seven children of Patrick and Margaret Moclair (née Carew). Her father was evicted from his farm by the local unionist politician and landlord, Arthur Smith-Barry, in March 1888. As a local organiser during the Plan of Campaign, her father was arrested and jailed a number of times, finally having his farm and home restored to him in 1911. Moclair attended the Presentation convent, Cashel and later the Ursuline convent, Waterford. She entered University College Dublin to study medicine, graduating MB, BCh, BAO in 1921 and DPH in 1922. She could also speak Irish fluently, and was an accomplished mezzo-soprano singer, winning the Denis O'Sullivan medal at the 1921 Feis Ceoil, and often performed at events and concerts.

== Career ==
In 1922 Moclair was unanimously elected as the first woman assistant master of the National Maternity Hospital, Dublin, having been nominated by Sir Andrew Horne having faced "some opposition from the more conservative Governors". Serving three consecutive annual terms from 1922 to 1925, in the last two she worked alongside Andrew Horne Jr, with dual posts of assistant master serving as residential posts. In the late 1920s, Moclair and Horne Jr held undergraduate posts in Vienna, and upon their return to Dublin, established a private practice.

Moclair demonstrated compassion to mothers and newborn babies, remarking that "the midwife knows more than we do", working to instil confidence in new mothers. She developed a pioneering pre-marital course with the Catholic social services, as well as delivering health and hygiene courses in vocational schools around for young women and mothers. With Dorothy Price, Moclair testified before the Carrigan Commission, which was reviewing the existing Irish law on sexual offences in Ireland. In her role as a representative of the Irish Women Doctors' Committee, she stated that Irish teenagers and young women were more innocent and naive than their British contemporaries, and were ignorant of facts concerning sex and reproduction. Citing this ignorance, she called for better sexual health education to counter the widespread ignorance amongst young women and girls. With Price, Moclair testified to their personal knowledge of cases of 13-year-old girls becoming mothers due to lack of education. They argued that the secrecy and shame associated with sexual assault resulted in low rates of reporting and only young women who became pregnant would admit they had been raped or sexually assaulted. Moclair's testimony, along with that of many other women experts, was largely ignored by the committee, and the transcripts remained sealed in the National Archives until 1999.

From the 1920s, Moclair served as president and chair of the Women's National Health Association, which was focusing on the elimination of tuberculosis and improving childhood health at the time. As a practising Catholic, she was a member of St. Joan's International Alliance, the Linen Guild which supported babies born in the National Maternity Hospital, Society of Saint Vincent de Paul, Catholic Social Welfare Bureau and other voluntary Catholic organisations including in her local parish in St Andrew's, Westland Row, Dublin. From 1963 to 1966, Moclair was president of Peamount Hospital, Newcastle, County Dublin. She served as an examiner for the Central Midwives Board of Ireland.

== Family and death ==
Moclair married Andrew Horne Jr at St Andrew's Church, Westland Row, Dublin on 23 November 1971. The couple had one son (1931–1946) and twin daughters, Margaret and Patricia. At first they lived and practised on Merrion Square, later moving to Cowper Drive, Rathmines. Moclair died at Dr Steevens' Hospital, Dublin, of renal failure on 23 November 1971.
