= Nival =

Nival may refer to:

- objects, organisms or places related to snow
- Nival zone highest vegetation zone in alpine regions
- Nival (company), video game studio based in Cyprus
- National Irish Visual Arts Library (NIVAL), is a public research resource dedicated to the documentation of 20th and 21st century Irish visual art and design.
