= Spy Manor Productions =

Portuguese film production company

- Industry: Film
- Founder: Vanda Everke
- Headquarters: Algarve, Portugal
- Key people: Vanda Everke
- Products: Motion pictures, film, documentaries
- Services: Film production
- Website: www.spymanor.com

Spy Manor Productions is an independent film production, film production services and consulting company based in Algarve, Portugal, founded in 2019 by Vanda Everke, who also serves as the company's executive producer.

== Studio ==
In 2021, Spy Manor Productions announced a partnership with UK based MovieBox Group to partner in the Movie Box Studios under phased development at the site of the old Unicer factory in Loulé.

== Filmography ==
=== There's Always Hope ===
A feature drama starring Colm Meaney and Kate Ashfield.

=== The Infernal Machine ===
A psychological thriller starring Guy Pearce.

The worldwide rights for The Infernal Machine were acquired by Paramount Pictures.

== Awards ==
At the 14th ART&TUR - International Tourism Film Festival, Spy Manor Productions received five awards for the promotional video 'Sky Base One’, about a movie inspired villa built in the shape of the Millennium Falcon spaceship from the Star Wars movies.

The awards received were in two categories. In the National Competition: 1st Prize Arts & Creativity; 1st Prize Innovation in Tourism; Best Film Technical Quality. In the international competition: 2nd Prize Arts & Creativity; 1st Prize Innovation in Tourism.

At the 15th ART&TUR - International Tourism Film Festival, a follow up production, "Sky Base One - Episode 2", received first prize in the National Competition, category: Innovation in Tourism.

== Sponsorships ==
Spy Manor Productions was a sponsor of the 21st Golden Trailer Awards and is a sponsor of the World Trailer Awards 2022.

== Sky Base One - The Event ==
In October 2023 Spy Manor Productions with London-based Seifermann and illusionist and mentalist Katherine Mills, launched 'Sky Base One', the sci-fi film inspired property in Carvoeiro (Lagoa).

Lotus Cars premiered the Lotus Evija electric supercar at the event.
