= David McGowan =

David McGowan is the name of:

- David McGowan (archer) (1838–1924), American archer
- David McGowan (footballer) (born 1988), Scottish football player
- David McGowan (rower) (born 1981), Australian Olympic rower
- David McGowan (rugby union) (born 1986), Irish rugby player, played in France
- David McGowan, character in Village of the Damned (1995 film)
- David McGowan (producer), producer of the documentary The Mark of the Maker
