= Athlone Institute of Technology =

Former higher educational institution

- Institiúid Teicneolaíochta Bhaile Átha Luain
- Logo of the institute of technology
- Former names: Athlone Regional Technical College
- Motto: English: Connect and Discover
- Type: Public
- Active: 1970–16 July 2021
- President: Ciarán Ó Catháin
- Academic staff: 256+
- Students: 6,000+
- Location: University Road, Athlone, Leinster, N37 HD68, Ireland; 53.41794°N 7.90462°W
- Campus: 18 hectares (44 acres)
- Colours: Red, blue, and yellow
- Website: ait.ie

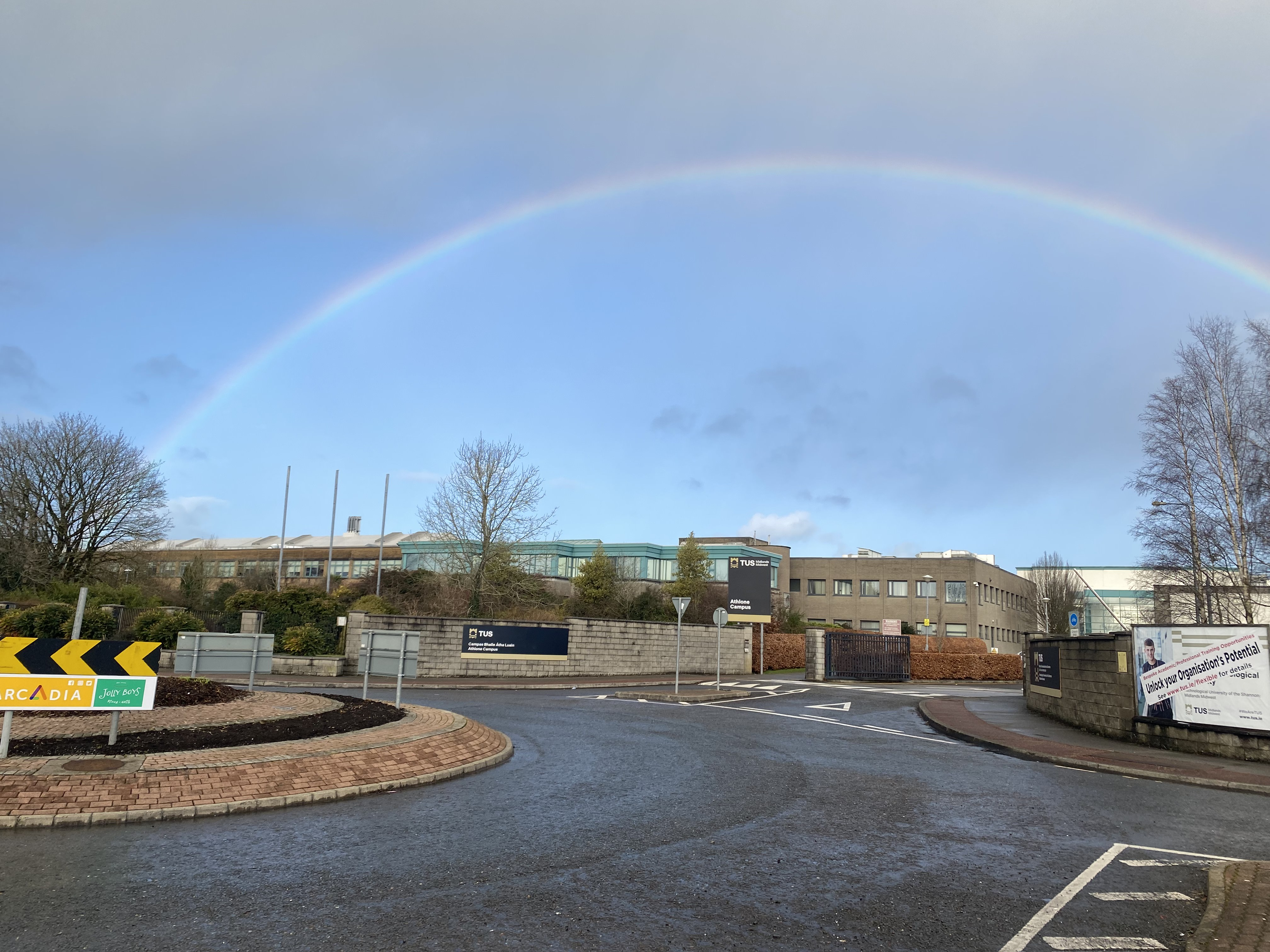
Entrance of AIT main campus

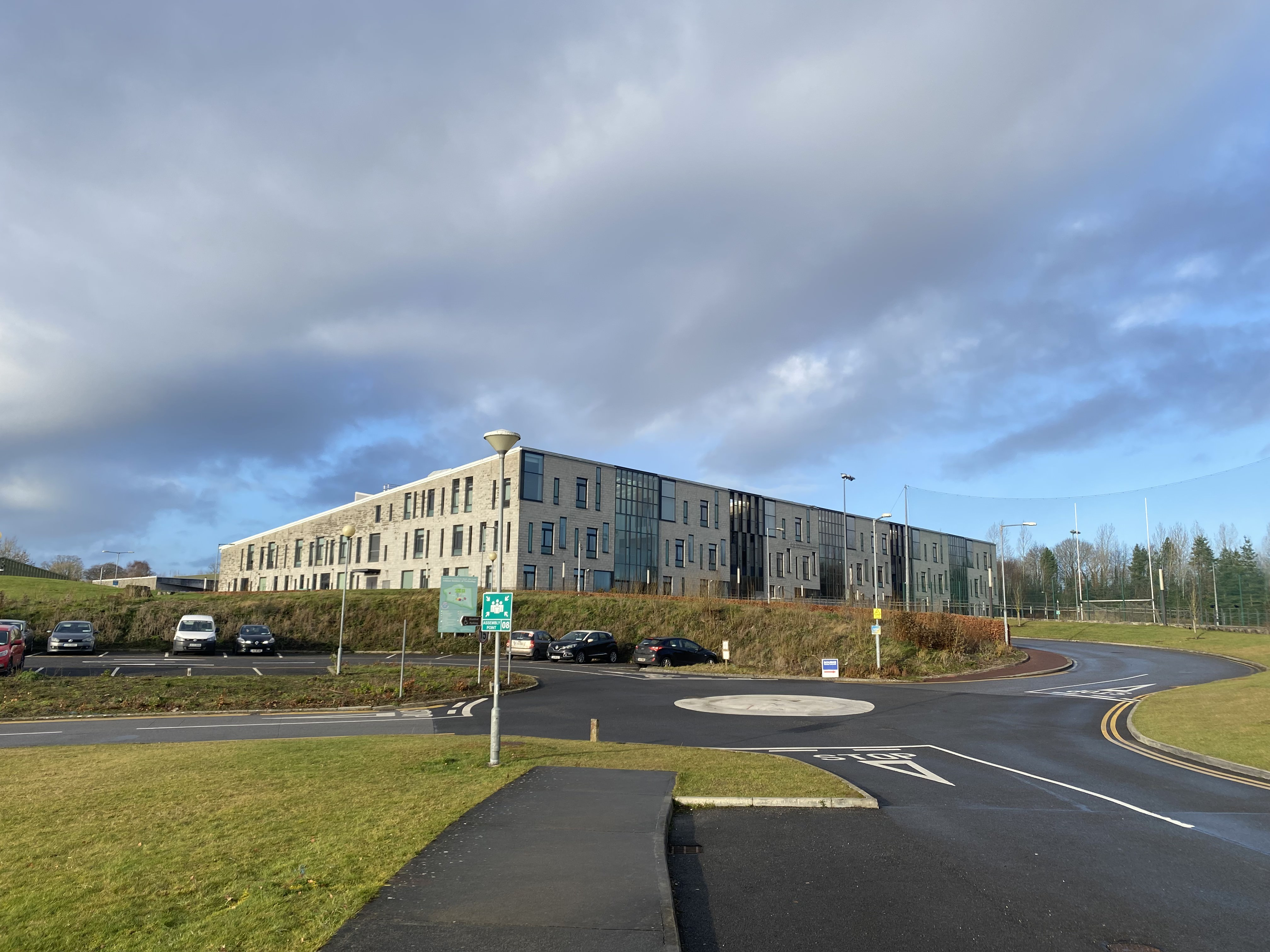
AIT Engineering & Science Building

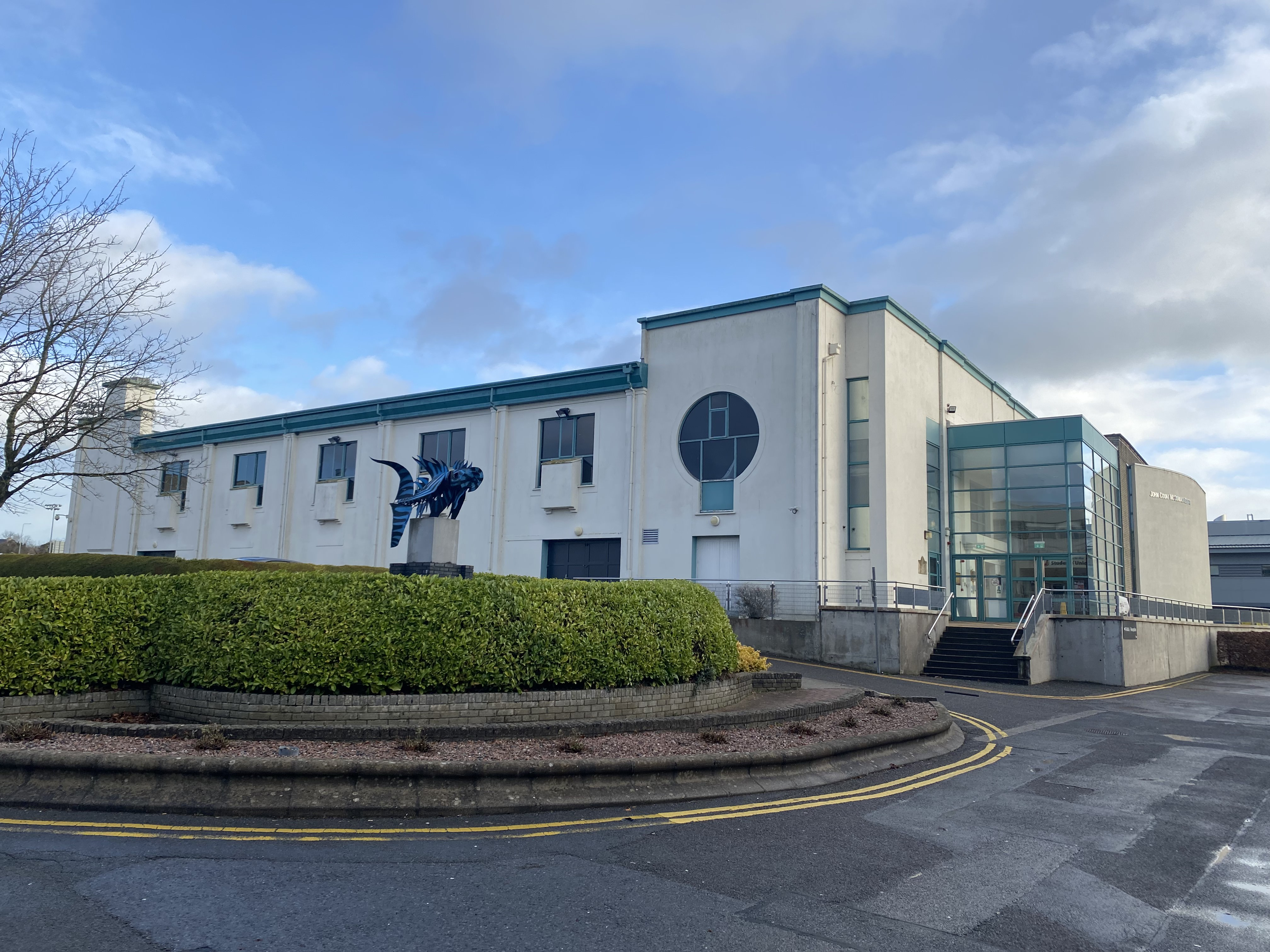
AIT John Count McCormack Centre

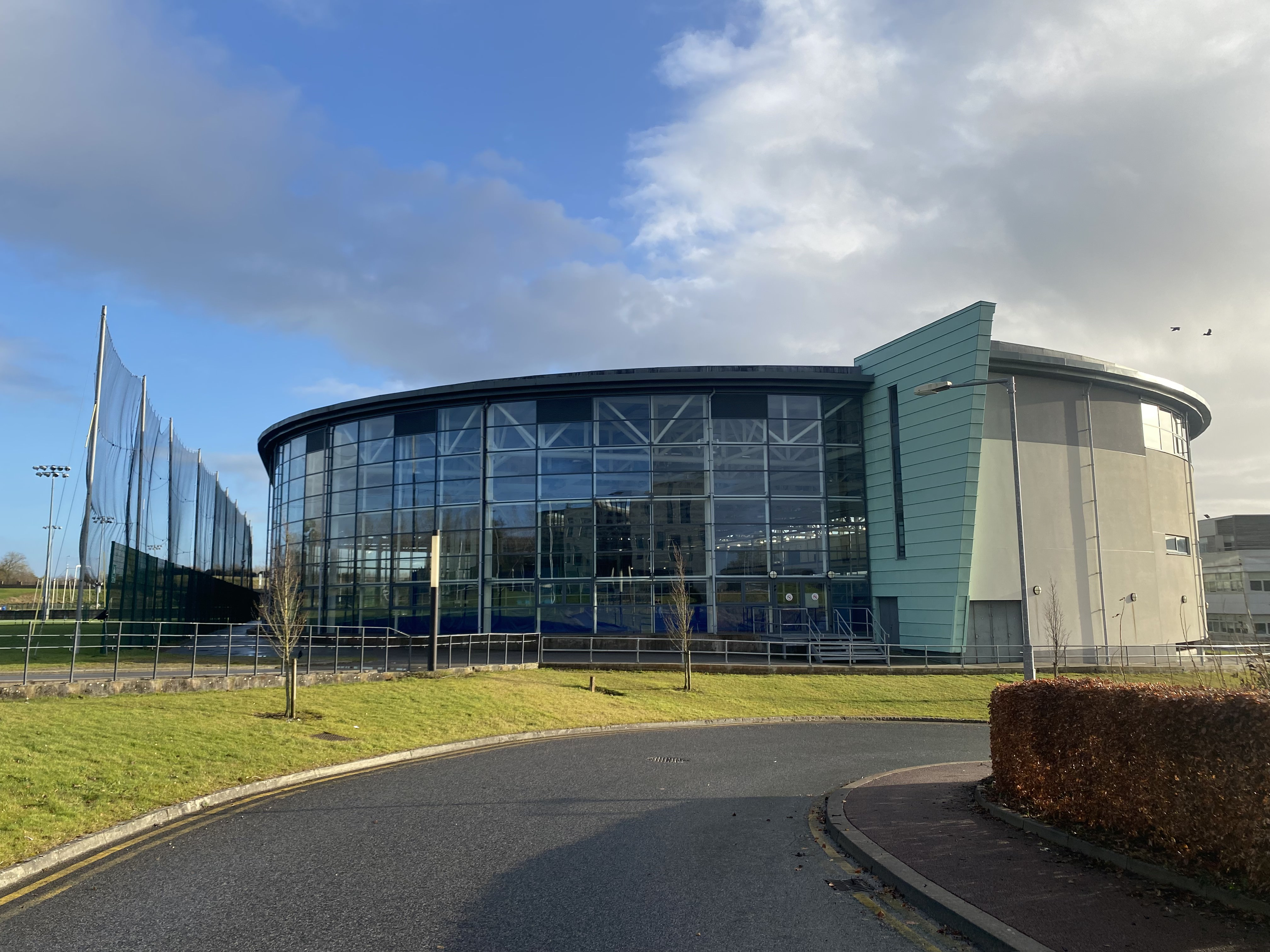
AIT Sport

The Athlone Institute of Technology (AIT; Irish: Institiúid Teicneolaíochta Bhaile Átha Luain) was an institute of technology, located in Athlone, Ireland. Established in 1970, the institute's campus was located on University Road.

A consortium between itself and the Limerick Institute of Technology was announced with the intention of forming a technological university. On 23 November 2020, the AIT-LIT Consortium announced that the joint Limerick-Athlone IT application for technological university (TU) status had been submitted for approval, which was granted in May 2021.

On 16 July 2021, the institute of technology was officially dissolved and succeeded by the Technological University of the Shannon: Midlands Midwest, which began operations on 1 October 2021.

== History ==
The Athlone Institute of Technology (AIT) was established by the Irish government in 1970 as the Athlone Regional Technical College, under control of the local Vocational Education Committee. The college gained more autonomy with the enactment of the Regional Technical Colleges Act 1992. In late 1997, as with the other RTC's, it was renamed as the Athlone Institute of Technology (AIT). In 1999, AIT became a validation authority with the power to award HETAC degrees.

In 2000, Ciarán Ó Catháin was appointed as the institute's president. Dr. David Fenton and James Coyle were previous holders of the post, having been called director and principal. In 2001, a School of Humanities was opened. In 2010, then-president of Ireland Mary McAleese spoke at the fortieth anniversary of the college.

The AIT had a campus size of 44 acres, and new, purpose-built facilities that included the Hospitality, Tourism and Leisure Studies building, built in 2003; the Nursing and Health Science building and the Midlands Innovation and Research Centre, built in 2005; as well as the Engineering and Informatics building and the Postgraduate Research Hub, built in 2010. RTÉ's Midlands studio and office have been located at the institute.

The institute had a memorandum of understanding with the Rio de Janeiro State University, one of the largest universities in the Brazilian city. It also had agreements with the Pontifical Catholic University of Minas Gerais, one of the largest Brazilian private universities. The institute also founded agreements with two leading Beijing universities, the Capital University of Economics and Business and the Beijing Union University. The agreements were signed by the Chinese Ambassador to Ireland and university representatives. Other agreements existed between the institute and TVTC, in Saudi Arabia, and a memorandum of understanding existed with the Georgia Institute of Technology. Further agreements existed with the Bharati Vidyapeeth, one of the largest universities in India.

=== College of sanctuary ===
In 2017, AIT became the first designated college of sanctuary in Ireland.

=== AIT-LIT Consortium and dissolution ===
In 2018, the institute had investigated the possibility of becoming a university in its own right. A consortium between itself and the Limerick Institute of Technology was announced in October 2019 with the intention of forming a technological university. On 23 November 2020, the AIT-LIT Consortium announced that the joint Limerick-Athlone IT application for technological university (TU) status had been submitted for approval. Approval was announced in May 2021 by minister of Higher Education, Simon Harris.

On 16 July 2021, both itself and the Limerick Institute of Technology were officially dissolved through a signed order by the minister. The institute was succeeded by the Technological University of the Shannon: Midlands Midwest, which began operations on 1 October 2021.

== Facilities ==
- The Goldsmith Library, named after Oliver Goldsmith, novelist, playwright and poet
- McCormack Hall, performance venue named after John McCormack, tenor
- Northgate street, former site of art and design, to be converted in to a digital hub

=== AIT International Arena ===
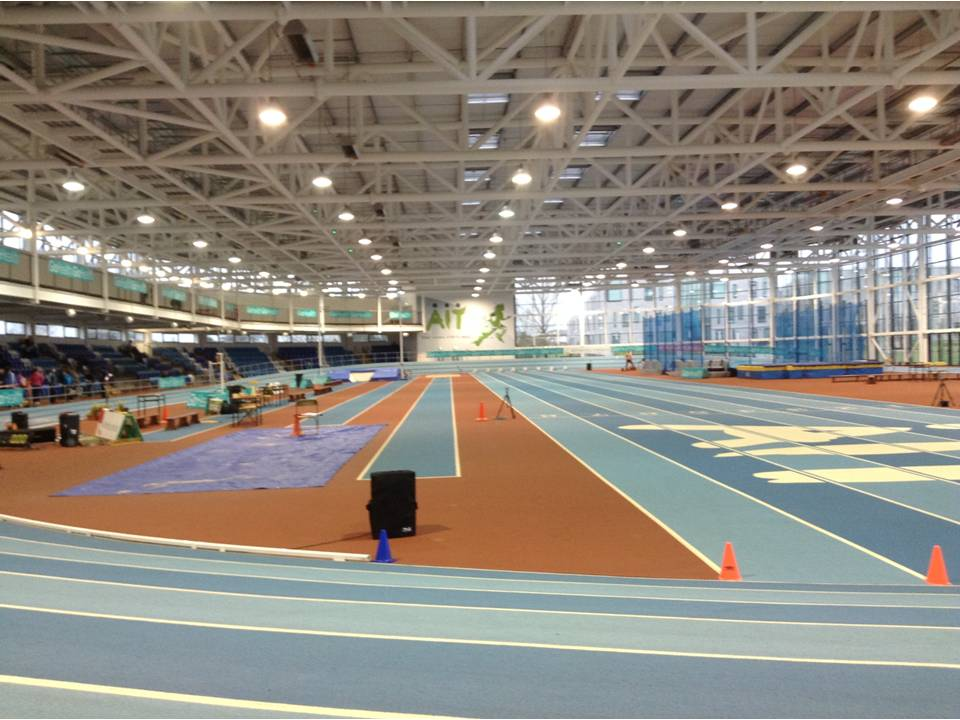
AIT International Arena, 2015

An international athletics arena with an overall building floor area of 9,715 m^{2} was opened in early 2013. The arena can house 2,000 spectators and was constructed at a cost of €10 million.

== Notable alumni ==
Arts and Media
- Anne Rigney, contemporary visual artist and sculptor
- Jacksepticeye, Irish YouTuber
- Yewande Biala, Love Island contestant

Politics

- Justin Barrett, Irish politician
- Gabrielle McFadden, Fine Gael politician
- Nicky McFadden, Fine Gael politician
- Robert Troy, Fianna Fáil politician

Sports

- David McGowan, rugby union player
- Shane Lowry, golfer
- Declan Qualter, hurler
- Bundee Aki, rugby union player
- Patrick Hickey, professional footballer

== See also ==
- Education in the Republic of Ireland
- List of higher education institutions in the Republic of Ireland
