= Qualters =

Qualters is an American surname, meaning the son of Walter a shortened form of the Irish Gaelic McWalters/MacWalters. Notable people with this surname include:

- Robert Qualters (born 1934), American painter, installation artist, and printmaker
- Tom Qualters (1935–2024), American baseball player
- Tot Qualters (1894–1974), American actress, dancer, and singer

== See also ==
- Qualter
