= Peter Boylan =

Irish obstetrician

Doctor Peter Boylan

Master of National Maternity Hospital
- In office 1991–1997
- Succeeded by: Declan Keane

Personal details
- Known for: Obstetrics; Abortion rights campaigning

Peter Boylan is a retired Irish consultant obstetrician, and former master of the National Maternity Hospital, Dublin (Holles Street Hospital).

He was born in Dublin to Henry Boylan and his wife Patricia Boylan (née Clancy). He was educated at St. Mary's College, Rathmines and University College, Dublin. On qualifying as an obstetrician in 1974 he practised in the United States and in Britain before returning to Ireland. He became master of Holles Street in 1991, holding the post for seven years.

Boylan was opposed to the plans to transfer ownership of the National Maternity Hospital to the Religious Sisters of Charity, eventually resigning from the board of the hospital over the issue. He campaigned for a Yes vote in the 2018 Irish abortion referendum, and participated in several TV debates.

== See also ==
- Abortion in the Republic of Ireland
- Eighth Amendment of the Constitution of Ireland
- Thirty-sixth Amendment of the Constitution Bill 2018 (Ireland)
- National Maternity Hospital, Dublin
