= Sanctuary campus =

University that protects undocumented immigrants

A sanctuary campus is any college or university, typically in North America and Western Europe, that adopts policies to protect members of the campus community who are undocumented immigrants. The term is conceptually similar to sanctuary jurisdictions, including sanctuary city, sanctuary county or sanctuary state. There are currently about 600 sanctuary jurisdictions of different sizes in the United States. Although there is no official legal definition of sanctuary city, the term generally refers to localities that welcome undocumented immigrants and decline to cooperate fully with federal detention requests related to undocumented immigrants. Proposed policies on sanctuary campuses include:

- Not allowing U.S. Immigration and Customs Enforcement (ICE) officers onto campus without a warrant.
- Refusing to allow campus police to enforce immigration law.
- Not sharing student immigration status with ICE.
- Not gathering information on immigration or citizenship status.
- Providing tuition support, including in-state tuition rates at public universities to students with DACA status.
- Providing distance-learning options for deported students to complete their degrees.
- Providing confidential legal support to students with immigration law questions and issues.
- Expanding policies to include medical and other facilities associated with the campus.
- Reducing the deployment of campus police to protests that seek to include undocumented students and workers to avoid intimidation of undocumented activists.
- Ending practices which undermine worker and student worker labor unions.

The American Association of University Professors endorsed the sanctuary campus movement on November 22, 2016, and urged colleges and universities to adopt sanctuary policies.

== Background ==
An estimated 200,000 to 225,000 college students in the United States are undocumented, according to the Pew Research Center. Approximately 49% of undocumented immigrants between 18 and 24 have attended college or university, compared with 71% of all US residents in this age group. There are approximately 832,881 DACA recipients, short for Deferred Action for Childhood Arrivals, residing in the United States. A survey revealed approximately 22.9 percent of DACA recipients were attending school with 73.5 percent of that portion working toward a bachelor's degree or higher. Additionally there has been a large increase in international students attending colleges and universities in the United States with more than 1.1 million (1,126,690) international students in 2023-2024, a 7 percent increase from the previous academic year.

President Donald Trump signed Executive Order 14188 on January 29, 2025 promising “forceful and unprecedented steps” to investigate international students who participated in on-campus pro-Palestine protests last year and potentially revoke their visas. The order demands the investigation of any student visa holder who participated in “pro-Hamas vandalism and intimidation,” with the possibility of their visa being revoked “if warranted.”

Many campuses do not have a clearly stated definition of what crosses the line into antisemitism, and many student protesters have complained that their anti-Israel demonstrations have been unfairly conflated with antisemitism. As campuses have responded, there has once again been elevated conversation around sanctuary campuses.

According to the Center for Immigration Studies, as of March 10, 2026, there were 13 states and hundreds of cities and counties with some sort of sanctuary laws that limit cooperation with federal immigration authorities. In response to increasing numbers of sanctuary jurisdictions and campuses before and during President Donald Trump's first term, at least 12 states banned sanctuary policies. There are no federal laws against sanctuary policies, but, while campaigning for his second term, President Trump stated he would “ask Congress to pass a law outlawing sanctuary cities nationwide, and … demand the full weight of the federal government on any jurisdiction that refuses to cooperate” with ICE.

== Protests and campaigns ==
In November 2016, students around the country staged demonstrations, walk-outs, and sit-ins in an effort to push their schools to declare themselves a "sanctuary campus" from President-elect Donald Trump's planned immigration policy of mass deportations. The Stanford, Rutgers, and St. Mary's protests on November 15, 2016 were among the first. In 2025, after the detainment of Mahmoud Khalil, a graduate student at Columbia University, the youth branch of the Democratic Socialists of America launched a nationwide sanctuary campus campaign and encouraged their branches at universities to start their own campaigns on their campuses. Colorado State University's YDSA chapter was the first to have a sanctuary campus campaign, protesting on February 13, 2025.

Universities and colleges with protest activity in support of sanctuary campuses include:

- American University
- Arizona State University
- Boston University
- Colorado State University
- Connecticut College
- Dartmouth College
- Drexel University
- Florida State University
- Hobart and William Smith Colleges
- Middlebury College
- Mills College
- Milwaukee School of Engineering
- New Mexico State University
- The New School
- Northeastern University
- Northern Arizona University
- Oberlin College
- Ohio University
- Portland Community College
- Rutgers University
- St. Mary's College
- Stanford University
- Stockton University
- Texas State University
- Texas Womans University
- Trinity College
- Tufts University
- University of California, Riverside
- University of Denver
- University of Illinois campuses
- University of Maryland
- University of Michigan
- University of Minnesota Twin-Cities
- University of Mississippi
- University of New Mexico
- University of North Texas
- University of Pennsylvania
- University of San Diego
- Vanderbilt University
- Wesleyan University
- Western New Mexico University
- Yale University

== School policies ==
In the wake of protests and petitions, at least eight colleges and universities have declared themselves sanctuary campuses, and many more have outlined policies and procedures that protect undocumented immigrant students and others threatened with registration or deportation. Student Governments across the United States are also unofficially declaring their universities as “Sanctuary Campuses”. Michigan State University's Associated Students of Michigan State University (ASMSU), for example, passed a student resolution bill 59-49 in 2023 to advocate and support MSU as a sanctuary campus for undocumented, immigrant, and international students.

=== Self-declared sanctuaries ===
Portland State University and Reed College were the first institutions in the country to officially declare their campuses as sanctuaries.

College/University	Support for DACA/ Undocumented Students	Pledge of Noncooperation with Deportations	Self-described "Sanctuary"	Surrounding Sanctuary Jurisdiction	Date	Statement by
Portland State University		Yes. "will not facilitate or consent … unless legally compelled to do so or in the event of clear exigent circumstances"	Yes.	Multnomah County	Nov 18, 2016	President Wim Wiewel
Reed College	Yes. Nondiscrimination, scholarships equivalent to Federal aid.	Yes. "Reed will not assist … absent a direct court order."	Yes.	Multnomah County	Nov 18, 2016	President John R. Kroger
Wesleyan University	Yes. Nondiscrimination, legal support.	Yes. "will not voluntarily assist"	Yes.		Nov 20, 2016	President Michael S. Roth
Pitzer College	Yes. Nondiscrimination, legal support, financial aid.	Yes. "will not voluntarily comply"	Yes.		Nov 30, 2016	President Melvin L. Oliver
Santa Fe Community College		Yes. No access except in emergency or with a warrant.	Yes.		Nov 30, 2016	Governing Board
University of Pennsylvania	Yes. Nondiscrimination, support, financial aid.	Yes. "will not allow … on our campus unless required by warrant."	Yes.		Nov 30, 2016	President Amy Gutmann, Provost Vincent Price, Exec VP Craig R. Carnaroli
Connecticut College	Yes.	Yes. "the College can and will use all available means to defend our undocumented students now and in the future."	Yes.	New London	Dec 1, 2016	President Katherine Bergeron
Drake University		Yes.	Yes.		Dec 1, 2016	President Marty Martin
Swarthmore College	Yes. Nondiscrimination in housing, financial aid.	Yes. "will not voluntarily grant access … will not support"	Yes.		Dec 2, 2016	Chair of the Board of Managers Thomas E. Spock and President Valerie Smith

=== Public declarations of protective policies ===
Rutgers president Robert Barchi responded that the school will protect the privacy of its illegal immigrants. California State University chancellor Timothy P. White made a similar affirmation. Iowa State University reaffirmed continuation of their already existing policy. Haverford College passed a resolution at the Fall 2022 Plenary (a biannual gathering of 2/3 of the student body that effectively creates policy for the college) that establishes Haverford as a sanctuary campus following their 2016 announcement of similar policies. Haverford's resolution will become official once signed by President Wendy Raymond.

== California Senate Bill 54 (California Values Act) ==
California Senate Bill 54 was introduced by California senator Kevin de León. The bill requires that California, very much like a sanctuary city, vastly limit its law enforcement agencies from working alongside federal immigration agencies, as well as prohibit them from using their resources to detain and investigate people amongst other regulations, on the basis of immigration purposes. California law enforcement agencies will no longer be able to transfer a person or release information regarding their criminal history to federal immigration agencies without an existing judicial warrant. In addition to that, local and state law enforcement agencies will also be required to release the names of inmates/parolees to federal immigration agencies 60 days prior to them being released from jail if they are or were convicted for a violent crime. If a California law enforcement agency and federal immigration agency work in joint efforts, the California law enforcement agency cannot take on the role of an immigration agency. Not only that but as of January 1, 2009 it will have to create a biyearly report about the frequency of the joint efforts and information exchanged, and that all would have to be posted in the Attorney General's website. The bill has been voted on by the California Senate. According to CNN, it resulted in a 27–12 lead with Democrats being the dominant supporters. Despite the support from the California senate, the bill still faces opposition from groups such as the California State Sheriff Association, that feels like it too tightly limits their ability to carry out their job.

The California public schools this bill will directly affect are any k-12 school under local governing or charter school boards, the California Community College, and the California State University branch. Under this bill the security, police agencies, and staff working for them will be limited to no longer inquire information regarding a person's legal status, release private information that is not yet available to the public, or detain and question amongst other things on the basis of aiding an immigration enforcement agency/investigation. In order for this to take place, three months after the bill is approved, the General Attorney would need to publish a policy with the regulations and limitations that the public schools will need to enact in order to guarantee confidentiality to the students in regards to not releasing their information to immigration authorities. Not only that, but the policy will include regulations that won't allow for immigration agencies to work in the campus or have individuals transferred to them unless a judicial warrant is present. The public schools are expected to follow the policy, or create their own that is up to par with the one created by the Attorney General. Since the state will be imposing new regulations on public schools, they are up for reimbursement for the money they spend implementing them. That is because under California Constitution, a school district/campus is eligible for reimbursement if it had to create a new space in its budget to carry out its mandate. According to the LA Times, even though the University of California is not one of the California public school obligated to implement this bill if passed, it is encouraged to adopt its policies because it is a government organization that provides education and social services among other things to the residents of California.

== Constitutionality of Sanctuary Cities ==
The legal basis for sanctuary school and safe zone protection:

- In Plyler v. Doe, the Supreme Court recognized a constitutional right of access to K-12 education for all students, regardless of their immigration status. Actions taken by the school, locality, or state to chill this access to schools, including engaging in activities that increase absenteeism of students, may violate Plyler.
- FERPA (Family Educational Rights and Privacy Act) requires schools to obtain written permission from parents or eligible students before releasing any information from a student's education record, and gives rise to liability if schools impermissibly release students’ information.
- The Fourteenth Amendment of the U.S. Constitution prohibits any state from denying “to any person within its jurisdiction the equal protection of the laws.” Furthermore, the Fourteenth Amendment's Due Process and Equal Protection Clauses shield all individuals from unfair and unjust treatment, regardless of race, sex, religion, or age.
- The Fourth Amendment of the U.S. Constitution gives all people the right to be free of unlawful searches, seizures, and warrantless arrests from law enforcement agents, and the U.S. Supreme Court has interpreted this right to apply as well to activities by immigration enforcement agents.
- The Tenth Amendment of the U.S. Constitution states that the powers not delegated to the United States by the Constitution are reserved to the States or to the people. Thus, the federal government cannot force states and localities to enforce federal immigration law.
- U.S. Immigrations & Customs Enforcement's longstanding policy is to strongly discourage immigration enforcement actions – arrests, interviews, searches, and surveillance – from taking place in “sensitive locations,” including hospitals, churches, and schools.

== European & Global Universities ==
In 2017, Athlone Institute of Technology became the first designated college of sanctuary in Ireland.

City of Sanctuary UK recognises certain universities as Universities of Sanctuary. The first Universities of Sanctuary were the University of Edinburgh and University of Warwick in 2017. One of the first University Colleges of Sanctuary was Somerville College, Oxford in 2021.

The following institutions have been recognized as Universities of Sanctuary due to their commitment to creating a culture of welcome for people seeking sanctuary within, and beyond, their campuses:

- Cardiff Metropolitan University: Awarded in 2018
- Cardiff University: Awarded in 2023
- Birkbeck University of London: Awarded in 2021
- King's College London: Awarded in 2024
- Dublin City University: Awarded in 2016
- University of Limerick: Awarded in 2017
- University College Cork: Awarded in 2018
- University College Dublin: Awarded in 2018
- University of Galway: Awarded in 2019
- Maynooth University: Awarded in 2020
- Trinity College Dublin: Awarded in 2021
- Somerville College, Oxford: One of the first University Colleges of Sanctuary, awarded in 2021
- Athlone Institute of Technology: The first designated college of sanctuary in Ireland, awarded in 2017
