= Danny Qualter =

- Born: Daniel Qualter; 23 January 1992 (age 34) Athlone, Ireland
- Height: 1.98 m (6 ft 6 in)
- Weight: 122 kg (19 st 3 lb)
- School: Sligo Grammar
- University: NUI Galway

Rugby union career
- Position(s): Lock, Back Row
Amateur team(s)
| Years | Team | Apps | (Points) |
- Buccaneers
Senior career
| Years | Team | Apps | (Points) |
| 2013–2017 | Connacht | 12 | (0) |
| 2017–2020 | Nottingham | 20 | (5) |
International career
| Years | Team | Apps | (Points) |
| 2011–2012 | Ireland U20 | 16 | (0) |
- Correct as of 11 February 2015

Danny Qualter (born 23 January 1992) is a rugby union player from Athlone in Ireland. His primary position is as a lock, though he also plays across the back row. Qualter currently plays for Irish provincial team Connacht in the Pro14, having been promoted from their academy in 2013.

Qualter is the son of Séamus Qualter, former manager of both the Westmeath and Roscommon senior hurling teams, and the grandson of P. J. Qualter, a hurling star with Galway in the 1960s and 1970s.

== Early life ==
Danny Qualter was born in 1992, and is the son of former inter-county hurling manager Séamus Qualter and grandson of Galway hurler P. J. Qualter. He was a student of Sligo Grammar, playing for the school's rugby side and winning the Connacht Schools Senior Cup.

In his youth, Qualter played a number of sports. He played at underage level with Westmeath club Southern Gaels in hurling, before switching to Roscommon club Clann na nGael. Qualter also played Gaelic football, representing the Roscommon minor team. He played against Kerry in an All-Ireland Minor Football Championship quarter-final in 2009, along with two future Connacht teammates, Jack Carty and Shane Layden.

He graduated with a B.A. from NUI Galway, conferred upon him on 17 October 2016.

== Rugby career ==
=== Connacht ===
Qualter, who plays club rugby with Athlone-based side Buccaneers, entered the Connacht Rugby Academy in the 2010–11 season. He was part of the Connacht side that won the 2011 Under-20 Interprovincial Championship, with the team completing a Grand Slam to claim the province's first title in the competition since 2001.

Qualter made his first appearance for the senior Connacht team on 1 December 2012, while still in the academy. He started on the bench against Edinburgh in the 2012–13 Pro12 during an injury crisis, and replaced flanker Johnny O'Connor after 71 minutes in a 23–24 defeat. Qualter made his European debut the following week against Biarritz in the 2012–13 Heineken Cup. He featured as a replacement as Connacht beat the 2011–12 European Challenge Cup winners by 22–14 in the Sportsgrounds. Qualter was again a replacement a week later in the return leg, as Connacht were beaten 17–0.

After three years in the province's academy, Qualter was given a senior contract ahead of the 2013–14 season. Despite being part of the senior set up however, Qualter did not feature for Connacht's senior side during the course of the season, not playing in either the 2013–14 Pro12 or Heineken Cup. He instead played for the second tier side the Connacht Eagles in the 2013–14 British and Irish Cup. Despite not appearing for the senior side, Qualter was awarded a one-year extension to his contract.

During the 2015-2016 season, Qualter again did not feature in the Pro12 campaign, but did make three appearances in the new Rugby Challenge Cup. In his first senior appearance of the season, Qualter was used as a back row replacement against Exeter Chiefs in a 33–13 defeat. On 13 December 2014, Qualter made his first senior start for Connacht, playing as the number 8 and lasting the full 80 minutes in a 27–29 away win over Bayonne. Qualter was used as a replacement lock in the final pool game against La Rochelle, with the 20–30 victory earning Connacht a place in the knockout stages. It was announced in May 2015 that Qualter had signed another one-year extension to his contract with Connacht to keep him with the team until the end of the 2015–16 season.

== Representative ==
Qualter has represented Ireland internationally at under-age level. He played for the team at Under-18, Youth Schools and Under-19 levels, before progressing to the Ireland Under-20 side. He was part of Ireland's squads for both the 2011 and 2012 Six Nations Under 20s Championship. In total Qualter made 15 appearances for the Under-20s.

== Links ==
It's Rugby Profile: https://www.itsrugby.co.uk/players/daniel-qualter-22360.html
