= Gerrit van Gelderen =

Irish film director

Gerrit van Gelderen (1926–1994) was a Dutch-born naturalist, wildlife broadcaster, film-maker, illustrator, and cartoonist, who lived and worked in Ireland for a large part of his life. He is famous for his television work on Amuigh Faoin Spéir (Irish: "Out Under the Sky") with Éamon de Buitléar. and his series To the Waters and the Wild that ran from 1974 until 1994.

Van Gelderen was born on 26 August 1926 in Rotterdam and was educated at the Royal Academy of Art, The Hague. He moved to Dublin, Ireland, in 1955 to work in advertising. Some of his illustrations featured in the Farmers' Journal. In the 1960s, he started working with de Buitléar, producing programmes for television.

Van Gelderen was a close friend of fellow Dutch graphic designer and artist Jan de Fouw, who had also moved to Ireland. Their families lived together in Islandbridge, before moving to adjoining houses in Glencullen, in the Dublin mountains

Van Gelderen and de Fouw were among a group of Dutch artists who took up residence in Ireland in the 1950s, including Guus Melai, Bert van Embden, Willem van Velzen, Piet Sluis, and Cor Klaasen, the latter of whom was particularly noted for his textbook cover-designs.

Van Gelderen died on 28 February 1994 at his home in Sandyford, following a lung operation. He was survived by his wife, Lies van Gelderen, and four children, Merlin, Aoife, Finn, and Oisín.

== Work ==
- Doings (Dublin: Educational Company of Ireland, 1975).
- An tOchtapas agus Rainn Eile (The Octopus and Other Verses) (Dublin: Clódhanna Teo, 1977), illustrations by Gerrit van Gelderen.
- The Burren (1984). Director, writer and cinematographer.
- Amuigh Faoin Spéir (Outdoors Beneath the Sky), RTÉ Television, 1963-1974, by Éamon de Buitléar and Gerrit van Gelderen, including drawings by Gerrit van Gelderen.
- To the Waters and the Wild, RTÉ Television, 1974-1994.
- To the Waters and the Wild/Adventures of a Wildlife Film Maker (Dingle: Brandon Books, 1986).
