= 2005 Christy Ring Cup =

- Dates: 4 June 2005 - 14 August 2005
- Teams: 10
- Champions: Westmeath (1stth title); John Shaw (captain); Séamus Qualter (manager)
- Runners-up: Down; Simon Wilson (captain); John Crossey (manager)
- Relegated: Derry

Tournament statistics
- Matches played: 26
- Goals scored: 104 (4 per match)
- Points scored: 759 (29.19 per match)
- Top scorer(s): Mattie Dowd (2-39)

The 2005 Christy Ring Cup is the inaugural edition of the Christy Ring Cup since its establishment by the Gaelic Athletic Association and is the second-tier of Hurling for senior county teams (the All-Ireland Senior Hurling Championship is the first-tier trophy). It is contested by ten GAA county teams ranked 13–22 in the 2005 All-Ireland Senior Hurling Championship.

Competing teams, from Connacht, Leinster, Munster and Ulster were divided into two groups of five, in which teams played each other only once, meaning two home games and two away games per team. The top two teams of each group qualified for the knock-out stages.

On 14 August 2005, Westmeath won the Christy Ring Cup following a 1-23 to 2-18 defeat of Down in the final.

Kildare's Mattie Dowd was the Christy Ring Cup top scorer with 2-39.

== Team changes ==
=== To Championship ===
Relegated from the Leinster Senior Hurling Championship

- Carlow
- Kildare
- Meath
- Westmeath
- Wicklow

Relegated from the Munster Senior Hurling Championship

- Kerry

Relegated from the Ulster Senior Hurling Championship (Continued to compete in Ulster)

- Derry
- Down

Promoted from the All-Ireland Senior B Hurling Championship

- Mayo
- Roscommon

== Teams ==
=== General Information ===
County	Last Provincial title	Last All-Ireland title	Position in 2004 Championship	Appearance
Carlow	—	—	Leinster preliminary round	1st
Derry	2001	—	Ulster semi-final	1st
Down	1997	—	Qualifiers round 1	1st
Kerry	1891	1891	Munster quarter-final	1st
Kildare	—	—	Leinster first round	1st
Mayo	1909	—	All Ireland senior b Runners-up	1st
Meath	—	—	Leinster first round	1st
Roscommon	1913	—	—	1st
Westmeath	—	—	Leinster quarter-final	1st
Wicklow	—	—	Leinster preliminary round	1st

=== Personnel and kits ===
County	Manager	Captain(s)	Sponsor
Carlow			
Derry			
Down			
Kerry			
Kildare			
Mayo			
Meath			
Roscommon			
Westmeath			
Wicklow			

== Group A ==
=== Table ===
Pos	Team	Pld	W	D	L	SF	SA	Diff	Pts	Qualification
1	Westmeath	4	3	0	1	10-64	8-49	+21	6	Advance to Knockout Stage
2	Down	4	3	0	1	14-72	9-57	+30	6	Advance to Knockout Stage
3	Meath	4	2	1	1	9-67	7-52	+21	5	
4	Roscommon	4	1	0	3	4-46	13-83	-64	2	Advance to Relegation Playoffs
5	Derry	4	0	1	3	7-49	7-57	-8	1	Advance to Relegation Playoffs

=== Round 1 ===
11 June 2005 Round 1	Derry	3-14 - 3-17	Down	Lavey Sportsfield
		Report

11 June 2005 Round 1	Westmeath	4-19 - 0-11	Roscommon	Cusack Park
	A Mitchell 1-7, B Kennedy 1-3, D McNicholas 1-2 (1 sl), J Clarke 1-1, B Connaughton, P Dowdall, B Connaughton, E Loughlin, D McCormack, J Shaw 0-1 each.	Report	M R Mulrey 0-5, D Mulvey 0-3, Connaughton, G Waldron, D Lohan 0-1 each.

=== Round 2 ===
18 June 2005 Round 2	Roscommon	1-15 - 1-13	Derry	Athleague Sportsfield
	R Mulry 0-8 (6f), T Reddington 1-0, J Moran, L Murray 0-2 each, M Connaughton, M Brehony, B Hanley 0-1 each.	Report	G Biggs 0-7 (4f), R Convery 1-2 (1f), R Kennedy 0-2, C Quinn, P Quinn 0-1 each.

18 June 2005 Round 2	Meath	3-16 - 2-10	Westmeath	Páirc Tailteann
	J Toole 1-4, P Coone 1-1, N Horan 0-4, N Reilly 1-0, S Clynch, M Cole, D Kirby 0-2 each, P Fagan 0-1.	Report	D McNicholas 1-3, A Mitchell 0-3, N Gavin 1-0, E Loughlin 0-2, B Connaughton, D McCormack 0-1 each.

=== Round 3 ===
25 June 2005 Round 3	Derry	1-14 - 2-11	Meath	Dean McGlinchey Park

25 June 2005 Round 3	Down	5-25 - 2-8	Roscommon	McKenna Park
	M Coulter 1-6, S Clarke 1-2, P Braniff 1-3, A Savage 1-1, B McGourty 0-4, G Adair 1-0, G Johnson 0-3, E Clarke 0-2, S Wilson 0-2, G Savage 0-1, C Coulter 0-1.	Report	D Lohan 1-1, J Moran 1-0, D Mulvey 0-3, M Connaughton 0-1, L Murray 0-1, B Hanley 0-1.

=== Round 4 ===
2 July 2005 Round 4	Meath	1-14 - 3-16	Down	Páirc Tailteann
	N Horan 0-6, J Toole 0-3, J Waters 1-0, S Clynch 0-3, K Dowd, D Kirby 0-1 each.	Report	G Johnston 1-4, P Braniff 1-3, M Coulter 0-5, S Clarke 1-0, E Clarke 0-2, A Savage, B McGourty, 0-1 each.

2 July 2005 Round 4	Westmeath	1-14 - 2-8	Derry	Cusack Park
	A Mitchell 0-6 (3f, 1 '65'), E Loughlin 0-3, D McNicholas 1-0, B Kennedy 0-2, D McCormack, J Shaw and N Gavin 0-1 each.	Report	F McGuigan 1-2, R Convery 0-4 (2f), J O'Dwyer 1-0, Gregory Biggs 0-1, Gary Biggs 0-1f.	Referee: T Ryan (Tipperary)

=== Round 5 ===
16 July 2005 Round 5	Down	3-14 - 3-21	Westmeath	Páirc Esler
			A Mitchell 1-4, B Kennedy 1-3, K Cosgrove 1-2, J Shaw 0-4, J Clarke 0-2, D Curley 0-1, E Loughlin 0-1, B Connaughton 0-1, B Murtagh 0-1, R Whelan 0-1.

16 July 2005 Round 5	Roscommon	1-12 - 3-26	Meath	Athleague Sportsfield

== Group B ==
=== Table ===
Pos	Team	Pld	W	D	L	SF	SA	Diff	Pts	Qualification
1	Carlow	4	3	0	1	5-50	5-53	-3	6	Advance to Knockout Stage
2	Kildare	4	3	0	1	11-54	7-50	+16	6	Advance to Knockout Stage
3	Kerry	4	2	1	1	12-59	8-46	+25	5	
4	Wicklow	4	1	1	2	8-55	10-49	+0	3	Advance to Relegation Playoffs
5	Mayo	4	0	0	4	7-41	13-61	-38	0	Advance to Relegation Playoffs

=== Round 1 ===
4 June 2005 Round 1	Kildare	4-12 - 1-17	Kerry	Sallins Road
	M Dowd (0-6, 3f, 1 ‘65’), A Quinn (2-0), J Dempsey (1-0), B Byrne (1-0), T Carew (0-3, 1f), A McAndrew (0-2), Colm Buggy (0-1).	Report	M Conway (0-12, 11f), E Sheehy (1-0), E Tuohy (0-1), S Sheehan (0-1), JM Dooley (0-1), I McCarthy (0-1), S Brick (0-1).

4 June 2005 Round 1	Carlow	2-13 - 1-13	Wicklow	Dr. Cullen Park
	Pat Coady 0-9, M Brennan 2-1, D Murphy 0-2, R Dunbar 0-1.		J O’Neill 1-4, J Keogh 0-3, D Hyland 0-2, A Tiernan 0-1, C Kavanagh 0-1.	Referee: A Stapleton (Laois)

=== Round 2 ===
11 June 2005 Round 2	Wicklow	2-12 - 2-13	Kildare	Pearse Park
	J O'Neill 2-4, D Hyland 0-5, A Tiernan, J Murphy, W O'Gorman 0-1 each	Report	M Dowd 0-9 (4f), A McAndrew, B White 1-0 each, T Carnew 0-2 (2f), C Buggy, J Dempsey.

12 June 2005 Round 2	Carlow	1-12 - 0-13	Mayo	Pearse Stadium
	Des Murphy (1-2), P Coady (0-4, two frees), C English (0-2, frees), D Shaw (0-1), D Roberts (0-1, from a 65), P Kehoe (0-1), B Lawler (0-1).	Report	A Freeman (0-6, three frees), K Higgins (0-3, one free), K Healy (0-1), S Broderick (0-1), D McConn (0-1), K Robinson (0-1).

=== Round 3 ===
25 June 2005 Round 3	Kildare	4-17 - 4-4	Mayo	Sallins Road
	M Dowd 1-9 (4 65s, 3f); R Coyle 2-0; J Dempsey 1-0; A McAndrew 0-2; J Brennan, A Quinn, B White, C Buggy, D Harney, T Murphy 0-1 each.	Report	K Higgins 1-2 (1-0 pen 2 frees); K Healy, S Broderick, A Howard 1-0 each; S Lenihan 0-2 (1f).

9 July 2005 Round 3	Kerry	3-11 - 2-14	Wicklow	Austin Stack Park
	M Conway 0-6 (0-5 frees), J M Dooley 1-3, E Fitzgeerald 1-0, E Touhy 1-0, P Randles 0-2.	Report	W Gorman 2-1, D Hyland 0-4 (0-1 free), J O’Neill 0-4 (0-2 frees), J Murphy 0-2, J Bermingham 0-2, B Rickerby 0-1.

=== Round 4 ===
2 July 2005 Round 4	Kerry	5-16 - 0-12	Mayo	Pearse Stadium
	M Conway (2-8, 5f), JM Dooley (3-3), S Brick (0-2), S Sheehan (0-2), P Randles (0-1).	Report	A Freeman (0-6f), G White (0-1), D McConn (0-1f), B Delaney (0-1), K Healy (0-1), S Broderick (0-1), R Campion (0-1).

6 July 2005 Round 4	Carlow	0-17 - 1-12	Kildare	Dr. Cullen Park
	P Coady (0-13, 11 frees, 2, 65's), M Brennan (0-1), R Dunbar (0-1), S McMahon (0-1), D Murphy (0-1),	Report	M Dowd (1-8, 1-5 frees), A (0-2), R Coyle (0-1), C Buggy (0-1).

=== Round 5 ===
6 July 2005 Round 5	Kerry	3-15 - 2-8	Carlow	Austin Stack Park
	M Conway 0-8 (0-5 frees), J M Dooley 1-2, D Young and E Tuohy 1-0 each, J Egan and P Lyons 0-2 each, T Flynn 0-1 free.	Report	P Coady 0-6 (0-5 frees), B Lawler 1-1, M Brennan 1-0 R Dunbar 0-1.

16 July 2005 Round 5	Wicklow	3-16 - 3-12	Mayo	Pearse Park
	J O'Neill (1-7), D Hyland (1-5), D Moran (1-0), B Rickerby (0-1), T Collins (0-1).	Report	S Duffy (1-1), P Reape (1-1), S Broderick (0-4), A Freeman (0-4), D McConn (1-0), D Kirby (0-2).

== Relegation Playoffs ==
30 July 2005 Semi-final	Wicklow	2-27 - 3-22	Derry	Páirc Tailteann
	D Hyland 1-4, J O’Neill 0-6, J Murphy 0-4, W O’Gorman 1-1, L Kennedy 0-2, A Tiernan 0-2, T Collins 0-2, B Rickerby 0-2, G Birmingham 0-1, P Lee 0-1, TJ Byrne 0-1.		Gregory Biggs 0-12, J O’Dwyer 2-0, F McGuigan 1-0, Gary Biggs, R Kennedy, C Quinn, P Quigg 0-2 each, P O’Kane, P Sweeney, K Kelly 0-1 each.

31 July 2005 Semi-final	Roscommon	1-13 - 0-15	Mayo	Athleague Sportsfield
	D Mulvey 0-6, G Waldron 1-0, M Connaughton 0-2, C Kelly 0-2, R Mulvey 0-1, J Moran 0-1, D Lohan 0-1.		A Freeman 0-9, S Broderick 0-4, S Coyne, A Hession 0-1.

13 August 2005 Final	Mayo	4-14 - 1-10	Derry	Markievicz Park
	K Higgins 2-3, K Healy 2-2, S Leneghan 0-2, A Freeman 0-4 (all frees), S Broderick 0-2, G White 0-1.	Report	J O'Dwyer 1-3, G Biggs 0-3 (2 f '65'), P Convery 0-2, S McBride, C Quinn 0-1 each.	Referee: A Heagney (Clare)

== Knockout stage ==
=== Bracket ===
Semi-Finals
1A	Westmeath	7-14
2B	Kildare	1-12
1B	Carlow	1-11
2A	Down	4-23

Final
1A	Westmeath	1-23
1B	Down	2-18

=== Semi-finals ===
30 July 2005 Semi-final	Westmeath	7-14 - 1-12	Kildare	Páirc Tailteann
	J Shaw 3-2, A Mitchell 0-5, K Cosgrove, R Wheelan, J Clarke 1-1 each, D Carty 1-0, E Loughlin, B Kennedy, D McNicholas, D Devine 0-1 each.	Report	M Dowd 0-7, A McAndrew 0-3, J Dempsey 1-0, T Carew, D Harney 0-1 each.	Referee: D Connolly (Kilkenny)

31 July 2005 Semi-final	Down	4-23 - 1-11	Carlow	Parnell Park
	M Coulter 1-7 (1-6f), P Braniff 2-4, G Johnson 1-3, S Wilson 0-3 (2f), B McGourty 0-2, G Savage, A Savage, S Clarke (f), E Clarke 0-1 each.	Report	P Coady 0-5 (4f), D Murphy 1-1, R Dunbar, D Roberts, K English, M Brennan, R Foley 0-1	Referee: T Ryan (Tipperary)

=== Christy Ring Cup Final ===
14 August 2005 Final	Westmeath	1-23 - 2-18	Down	Croke Park
	A Mitchell 0-9 (8f, 0-1 '65'), J Shaw 1-3, E Loughlin 0-4, B Kennedy, K Cosgrove, B Murtagh 0-2 each, R Whelan 0-1.	Report	M Coulter 0-8 (8f), G Johnson 1-3, S Clarke 1-1, B McGourty 0-2, E Clarke, G Adair, A Savage, F Wilson 0-1 each.	Referee: D Richardson (Limerick)

== Stadia and locations ==
County	Location	Province	Stadium(s)	Capacity
Neutral venue	Dublin	Leinster	Croke Park	82,300
Carlow	Carlow	Leinster	Dr Cullen Park	11,000
Derry	Derry	Ulster	Celtic Park	22,000
Down	Newry	Ulster	Páirc Esler	20,000
Kerry	Tralee	Munster	Austin Stack Park	12,000
Kildare	Newbridge	Leinster	St Conleth's Park	8,200
Mayo	Castlebar	Connacht	MacHale Park	25,369
Meath	Navan	Leinster	Páirc Tailteann	11,000
Roscommon	Roscommon	Connacht	Dr Hyde Park	25,000
Westmeath	Mullingar	Leinster	Cusack Park	11,000
Wicklow	Aughrim	Leinster	Aughrim County Ground	7,000

== Championship Statistics ==
=== Top Scorers Overall ===
Rank	Player	County	Tally	Total	Matches	Average
1	Mattie Dowd	Kildare	2-39	45	5	9.00
2	Martin Coulter	Down	2-35	41	6	6.83
3	Pat Coady	Carlow	0-37	37	5	7.40

=== Scoring events ===
- Widest winning margin: 26 points
  - Down 5-25 - 2-08 Roscommon (Round 3)
- Most goals in a match: 8
  - Kildare 4-17 - 4-04 Mayo (Round 3)
  - Westmeath 7-14 - 1-12 Kildare (Semi-finals)
- Most points in a match: 49
  - Wicklow 2-27 - 3-22 Derry (Relegation playoff semi-final)
- Most goals by one team in a match: 7
  - Westmeath 7-14 - 1-12 Kildare (Semi-finals)
- Most points by one team in a match: 27
  - Wicklow 2-27 - 3-22 Derry (Relegation playoff semi-final)
- Highest aggregate score: 64 points
  - Wicklow 2-27 - 3-22 Derry (Relegation playoff semi-final)
- Lowest aggregate score: 28 points
  - Carlow 1-12 - 0-13 Mayo (Round 2)

== Miscellaneous ==
- Westmeath won their 1st championship in 14 years, winning the 1991 All-Ireland Senior B Hurling Championship.
- Westmeath became the first county to win the Christy Ring Cup.

== See also ==
- 2005 All-Ireland Senior Hurling Championship
- 2005 Munster Senior Hurling Championship
- 2005 Leinster Senior Hurling Championship
- 2005 Ulster Senior Hurling Championship
- 2005 Nicky Rackard Cup (Tier 3)
