= Séamus Qualter =

Irish hurler and manager

Personal information
- Native name: Séamus Mac Ualtair (Irish)
- Born: 1967 (age 58–59) Turloughmore, County Galway, Ireland
- Occupation: ol

Sport
- Sport: Hurling
Club
- Years: Club
- Turloughmore
Club titles
- Galway titles: 1oireachtas 1992
- Connacht titles: 2 Keogh cups 1994 1995
- All-Ireland Titles: 2 Christy Ring cups 2005/2007
Inter-county
- Years: County
- 1 National hurling league 4 Connacht u 21 titles and 1 all Ireland U 21 title with Roscommon

Séamus Qualter (born 1967) is an Irish former hurler and hurling manager.

== Playing career ==
Born in Turloughmore, County Galway, Qualter played competitive hurling in his youth. At club level he is a one-time Connacht medallist with Turlougmore. In addition to this he also won one championship medal with the club.

== Managerial career ==
He managed Westmeath to the inaugural Christy Ring Cup triumph in 2005. That same year he was coach and manager of the Irish Shinty team when they played Scotland in Inverness. In 2006, Westmeath defeated Dublin in the Leinster Senior hurling quarter final, and he managed the team against Brian Cody's Kilkenny in the semi-final in Mullingar. Westmeath lost the game 1–23 to 1-7 attended by 8,500, a record for a Westmeath hurling game. He repeated his Christy Ring success in 2007 when Westmeath defeated Kildare in the final.

In 2011, he managed Roscommon to win division 2b of the national hurling league and in 2012 managed the same county to win the all Ireland b hurling title when they defeated Kildare in the final 3–17 to 3–16 in Thurles.

After retirement from playing Qualter became involved in team management and coaching. At club level he has managed St. Faithleach's Gaelic football team in Roscommon. During his tenure as manager of the Westmeath senior hurling team, Qualter delivered two Christy Ring Cup titles, while he also took charge of the Westmeath minor hurlers. He later served as manager of the Roscommon under-21 and senior hurling teams.

He joined the management team of Stephen Sheil at Sligo upon Sheil's appointment in 2023.

== Family ==
His father, P. J. Qualter, played hurling for Galway from 1966 until 1977, while his son, Danny, is a rugby union player for Nottingham Rugby.

== Honours ==
=== Player ===
Turloughmore

- Connacht Senior Club Hurling Championship (1): 1985
- Galway Senior Club Hurling Championship (1): 1985
- Galway Minor Club Hurling Championship (1): 1984

=== Manager ===
- Westmeath—Christy Ring Cup (2): 2005, 2007

Sporting positions
Preceded by Tom Ryan	Westmeath Senior Hurling Manager; 2005–2007	Succeeded by Johnny Dooley
Preceded by Dave McConn	Roscommon Senior Hurling Manager; 2009–2013	Succeeded by Justin Campbell
