= Declan Meagher =

Irish obstetrician (1921–2019)

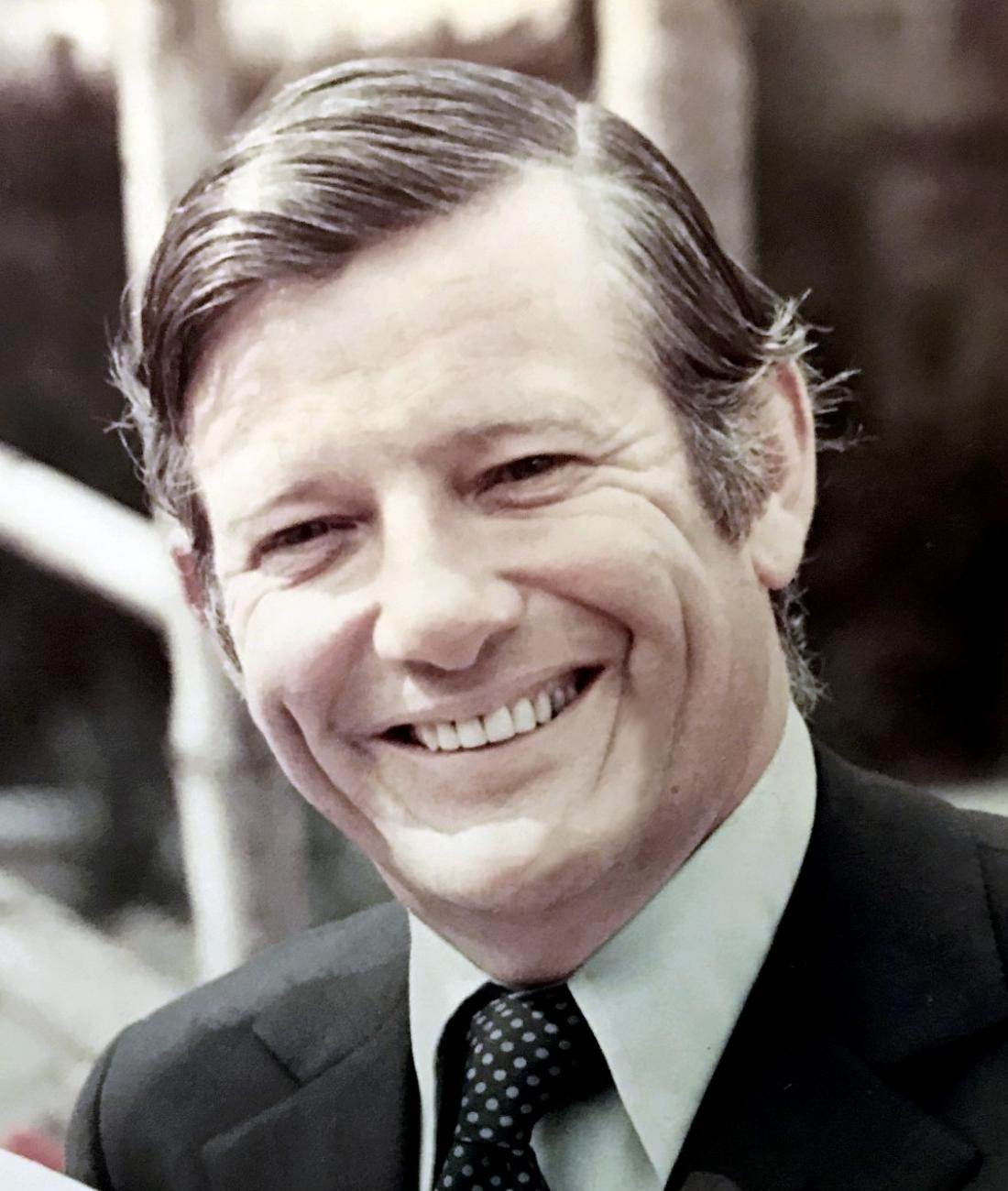
- Meagher in 1980

Master of National Maternity Hospital
- In office 1970–1976
- Succeeded by: Dermot W MacDonald

Personal details
- Born: 21 March 1921 Ferbane, County Offaly, Ireland
- Died: 3 November 2019 (aged 98) Dublin, Ireland
- Known for: Women's Health; Obstetrics

Declan J Meagher (21 March 1921 – 3 November 2019) was an Irish obstetrician, Master of the National Maternity Hospital, Dublin, and a champion of women's reproductive health.

== Career ==
In 1963, Meagher set up one of the country's first family planning clinics. This was a time when most women in Ireland lived in poverty, had a large number of children, and suffered from high childbirth mortality rates.

Meagher, who by 1970, had become Master of the National Maternity Hospital in Dublin, one of the largest maternity hospitals in Europe, sought to reduce perinatal mortality by implementing a new approach to the management of childbirth. He did so by giving a greater role to midwives, providing additional support for mothers and reducing prolonged labour. "The Dublin Experience" helped usher in the modern era of Irish obstetrics and led to the development of a clinical package of care now internationally known as "active management of labour".

== Charity ==
After his career at the National Maternity Hospital, Meagher took over as Director-General of the Holy Family Hospital in Bethlehem, in the West Bank. There, with the Order of Malta and the European Union, he helped build Palestine's first maternity ward, introduced maternity training programs for local doctors and midwives, and set up rural maternity care clinics for Palestinian women.

== Publication ==
Meagher co-authored with Kieran O'Driscoll, The Active Management of Labour, which is used in medical school curricula in Europe, Australia, Canada, Great Britain, and the United States.
