= John Archer (magician) =

British comedy magician, television writer and actor

- Spouse: Julie
- Children: 3

Comedy career
- Medium: Comedian, magician

John Archer is a British comedy magician, television writer and actor. As well as performing magic, he has also commercially released a number of his tricks through various magic suppliers.

== Career ==
Archer was a police officer in Cleveland Constabulary in the north-east of England for ten years, until 1996 when he was medically retired due to partial hearing loss, after which he began entertaining full-time.

In 1998, Archer was awarded the Ken Dodd President's Trophy for Best New Magical Comedy Entertainer. In February 2000, he took part in the British Magical Championships, and was awarded British Magical Champion of Comedy. In November 2002 at The Magic Circle Awards Banquet he was promoted to Member of the Inner Magic Circle – with gold star, and was also awarded The Carlton Comedy Award for outstanding use of comedy and magic. In 2003, he was awarded the Senator Crandall Award for Comedy at Abbot's convention in the United States, and won The Magic Circle's Stage Magician of the Year competition in October 2008.

He appeared on the hidden camera series Undercover Magic, broadcast in the UK on Sky. Archer was also involved in writing for television. He regularly supports comedian Tim Vine on tour and also writes with him on various TV projects. In the music tour Plastic Elvis, Vine pays homage to Elvis Presley and Archer plays Big Buddy Holly.

Archer appeared on the ITV show Penn & Teller: Fool Us on 7 January 2011, hosted by Jonathan Ross. On this programme, magicians from Great Britain and around the world attempted to trick the magic greats Penn & Teller; if they did, the prize was to open the Penn and Teller show at the Rio Casino in Las Vegas. Archer was the first magician on the programme to successfully fool Penn & Teller.

In 2011, Archer also performed at the Edinburgh International Magic Festival.

In 2012 Archer appeared in a 13-part series for CBBC called Help! My Supply Teacher's Magic.

A second series, Help My Supply Teacher is Still Magic, aired in 2013 and won a BAFTA in the Entertainment Category at the Children's BAFTAs in November 2013

Archer appeared on the audition stage of Britain's Got Talent on 25 May 2019. While he achieved four 'yeses', his appearance was criticised due to his previous professional credits. He made it to the top 3 in semi-final 3 alongside Colin Thackery & Kojo Anim. Thackery won the public vote, leaving the judges to choose between Archer and fellow comedian Kojo Anim. Simon Cowell, Amanda Holden and Alesha Dixon opted for Anim, therefore sending Archer home.

== Personal life ==
John Archer is married to Julie and lives in Teesside, they have three children. He is a devout Christian and discussed his faith in depth in his episode of The Magician's Podcast.

== Credits ==
- Help! My School Trip is Magic - CBBC
- Help! My Supply Teacher is Still Magic - CBBC (BAFTA)
- Help! My Supply Teacher's Magic - CBBC
- Penn & Teller: Fool Us Series 1, Episode 1 - ITV1
- Undercover Magic - Sky1
- Rose d'Or TV Awards 2005 - scriptwriter
- The Impressionable Jon Culshaw - ITV1 (writing and appearing)
- Claverdeek (short film) - BBC2 (appearing)
- Give Us a Clue - BBC1 (appearing)
- The Sketch Show - ITV1 (BAFTA) Series 1 and 2 (writer)
- Alter Ego - ITV1 (writing and appearing with Jon Cullshaw)
- Fluke - Channel 4 (writing and appearing)
- It's a Knockout Series 2 - Channel 5 (writer)
- It's a Knockout Christmas Show '99' - Ch5
- The Tim Vine Christmas Present - Channel 5 (writing and appearing)
- Whittle - Channel 5 (writer)
- Look North - BBC1
- Not The Jack Docherty Show - Channel 5 (writing and appearing)
- Fort Boyard - Challenge TV (writer)
- Fort Boyard - All around the World - Challenge TV (writer)
- Stand up Live - LiveTV
- Dutch milk advertisement - Dutch TV
- Tim Vine Travels in Time - (actor)
- Not Going Out - War (Mini Bus Driver)
