= Katherine Mills =

English magician and mentalist

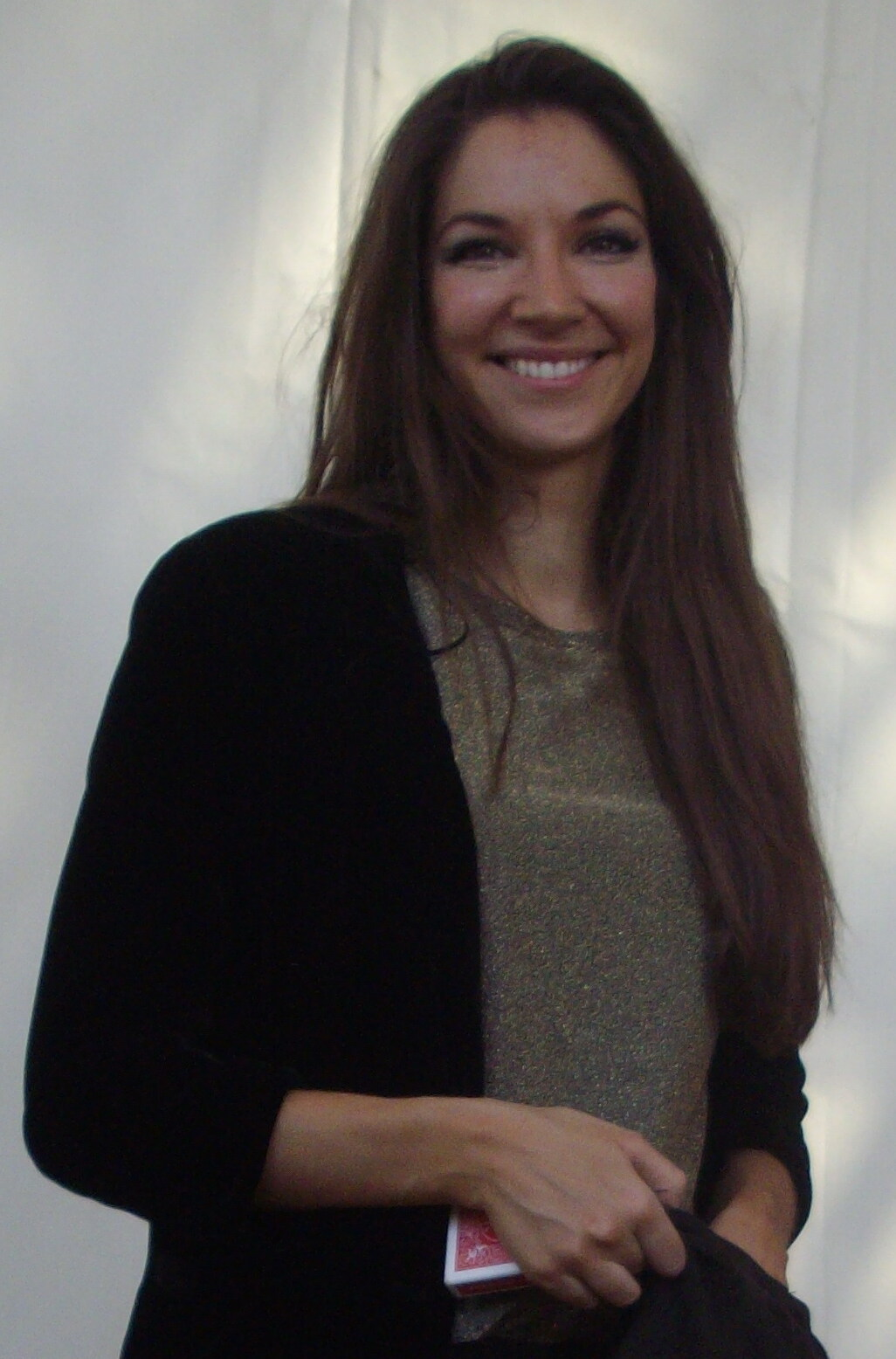
- Mills in 2012
- Born: 5 January 1983 (age 42); England
- Occupation(s): Magician, mentalist
- Years active: 2008–present
- Website: katherinemills.co.uk

Katherine Mills (born 1983) is an English magician and mentalist. She had her own show, Katherine Mills: Mind Games, on cable channel Watch. She also appeared in the BAFTA Children's Award–winning show Help! My Supply Teacher's Still Magic.

== Early life ==
When she was a teenager, Mills became interested in magic and, particularly, the work David Blaine (going as far as recording his magic tricks on television and rewatching them to figure out how they were done,) but gave it up when she went to university. She studied social psychology at Loughborough University.

== Career ==
Mills joined The Magic Circle in 2008. She first appeared in the CBBC series Help! My Supply Teacher's Still Magic, which won the BAFTA Children's Award for Children's Entertainment in 2013. On 2 October, 2014, her own show, Katherine Mills: Mind Games, started airing on Watch. She was the first female magician to get her own show on British television. Mills was invited back to the BAFTAs in 2015 to perform and present an award.

Mills is one of only 80-100 female magicians out of 1,500 magicians in The Magic Circle.
