= David McGowan (rugby union) =

Irish rugby union player

- Born: David McGowan; 23 February 1986 (age 40) Sligo, Ireland
- Height: 1.96 m (6 ft 5 in)
- Weight: 108 kg (17 st 0 lb)
- University: Athlone Institute of Technology; Institute of Technology, Sligo

Rugby union career
- Position: Lock
Amateur team(s)
Years	Team	Apps	(Points)
- Sligo
–	Buccaneers		
Senior career
Years	Team	Apps	(Points)
2005–2007	Connacht	5	(0)
2007–2012	La Rochelle	102	(0)
International career
Years	Team	Apps	(Points)
2005	Ireland U19		
2006	Ireland U21		

David McGowan (born 23 February 1986) is a former rugby union player. He is originally from Sligo in the province of Connacht, Ireland.

== Further Education ==
He is also planning for his future after Rugby by studying for a Manufacturing Management Degree through an on-line course via Institute of Technology, Sligo. He is scheduled to graduate in November 2010. He also studied civil engineering in Athlone Institute of Technology to ordinary degree level.

=== Rugby ===
His position is lock. He has represented Ireland at Under 19 & Under 21 levels. He first played for Irish club Sligo RFC and later Buccaneers RFC and he went on to represent his native province Connacht Rugby initially as a member of the academy.

With playing opportunities limited at Connacht David left for France in the summer of 2007, where he joined and currently plays for La Rochelle initially in the French Rugby Pro D2 league.

==== Top 14 ====
At the end of season 2009-2010 La Rochelle qualified for a play-off final to qualify for the Top 14, with a 32–26 victory against Lyon OU in the ProD2 play-off final at Brive's Stade Amédée Domenech and achieve promotion to the top level of French Rugby for season 2010–2011.
