= Help! My Supply Teacher's Magic =

British children's television series

- Created by: Anthony Owen
- Starring: James Went; Katherine Mills; John Archer
- Original language: English
- No. of seasons: 2
- No. of episodes: 26

Production
- Production company: CBBC

Original release
- Network: CBBC
- Release: 2012

Help! My Supply Teacher's Magic is a CBBC show which shows magicians in schools, tricking children into thinking they are supply teachers. It is presented by Iain Stirling. It also has different sections such as an interactive trick, which is played using images on the screen, or displaying some tricks which can be done at home.

The magicians featured are James Went, Katherine Mills, Fergus Flannigan and John Archer. The series was created and executive produced by Objective Productions by Anthony Owen.

A segment called Up, Close and Magical involves the magicians showing a trick to members of the public, either at a theme park, supermarket or a club.

There is a segment called Wannabe Wizards which features Stirling looking through clips of magic tricks which viewers have sent in. In the first series, he would usually pick his top 5 each episode. However, in the second series, he would only choose one per episode.

The first series began in January 2012 and finished in April. The second series began in January 2013 and was titled Help! My Supply Teacher's Still Magic and featured the magicians putting on disguises when posing as supply teachers as viewers are likely to already notice them. It features the same segments as the first series. A third series was titled Help! My School Trip is Magic and featured the magicians performing tricks on school trips at non-school locations, such as the Royal Opera House.

In 2013, the program won a BAFTA Children's Entertainment award.
