= Paul Peter Piech =

Ukrainian-American artist, printmaker and publisher

Paul Peter Piech was an American artist, printmaker, and publisher. Born in Brooklyn to Ukrainian parents, he spent a large part of his life in Wales, Piech is notable for his linocut and woodcut prints that advocate for social justice.

The Independent claims his "books and posters confront the viewer with the need for global responsibility and co-operation."

The National Library of Wales described Piech as "internationally acclaimed."

His Taurus Press published an edition of De Profundis by Oscar Wilde; Ugly Pieces of Metal by William J. Leahy; and John Gurney's poems Coal, a Sonnet Sequence, the last of which had illustrations by Piech.

== Biography ==
=== Early life ===
Piech was born to Ukrainian parents in Brooklyn on February 11, 1920. His parents had immigrated from Ukraine to Brooklyn seven years earlier (circa 1913). Piech was raised speaking Ukrainian; his parents read him a variety of poetry and stories from their home country.

When Piech was 19, he studied at the Cooper Union College of Art in New York City. His professors included German artists Hans Moller and George Salter.

=== Career ===
In 1937, Austrian-American artist Herbert Bayer of the Dorlands Advertising Agency hired Piech as a graphic artist. Piech's designs were influenced by Bayer's Bauhaus aesthetic, as well as "Klee, Picasso[,] William Blake and German Expressionism."

During WWII, "he was posted to Cardiff" with United States Eighth Army Air Force. His duties included painting pinup art of blonde women in the front of aircraft to illustrate the "affectionate female nicknames" of the aircraft.

In 1947, he married Welsh nurse and midwife Irene Tomkins in Wales. The couple had 1 daughter.

A GI education grant enabled him to study further at the Chelsea College of Art.

From 1951 to 1968, he worked as an artistic director for W. S. Crawfords Advertising. His campaigns included W. & T. Avery.

In 1959, while still working in advertising, he set up his own printmaking company, The Taurus Press. According to The Independent, "[o]ver the next decade, he accumulated a Gem proofing press and other commercially redundant letterpress printing equipment. In the early years, he used metal type to set his texts, but he became increasingly attached to his own rough and expressive linocut lettering." This led him to the creation of linocut images alongside "wise words" or "crass boasts" of figures including John F. Kennedy, Martin Luther King Jr., and Richard Nixon.

Beginning in 1968, he quit advertising to work freelance as a graphic artist and educator. He "did not crave the perfect studio," instead working in garages of his series of suburban homes; living at different times in Middlesex, Herefordshire and Wales. He taught at Chelsea College of Arts, London College of Printing, Watford College of Art and Design and Leicester College of Art.

In 1979, the American Embassy protested Piech's print featuring an American flag turned sideways to represent prison bars, captioned "My country 'tis of thee, sweet land of liberty."

=== Later life ===
Piech moved to Wales in the 1980s. He spent the last decade of his life in Porthcawl, Wales. He died on May 31, 1996, in Porthcawl.

== Legacy ==
As of 2020, the National Library of Wales owns 200 of Piech's prints and posters, as well as 3,000 of the lino blocks he used, from whole prints to individual letters.

Other collections are held by the Wrexham Regional Print Center and the Victoria and Albert Museum in London.

On February 1, 2020, Mari Elin Jones curated The Literary World of Paul Peter Piech, an exhibition at the National Library of Wales celebrating Piech's art and life. Prints on display included Piech's portraits of D. J. Williams, Harri Webb, Stevie Smith, and Ezra Pound.
