= Patricia Boylan =

Irish actor and journalist

- Born: Patricia Clancy; 12 March 1913; Coalisland, County Tyrone, Ireland
- Died: 23 February 2006 (aged 92); Dublin
- Occupations: Actor and journalist

Patricia Boylan (12 March 1913 – 23 February 2006) was an Irish actor and journalist.

== Early life ==
Patricia Boylan was born Patricia Clancy in Coalisland, County Tyrone on 12 March 1913. Her parents were Patrick, a general and wholesale draper and Justice of the Peace, and Anne Clancy (née Treanor). She was the 10th child of 12 children, four girls, and eight boys. The family moved to Dungannon, and then Belfast, where Boylan attended St Patrick's Girls' Academy. Enjoying studying English, and developing an interest in acting, she doorstepped Arthur Shields during his visit to Belfast pretending to be a journalist. She wrote up the meeting, and it was published in The Irish News. Boylan attended the Municipal Technical College, learning typing and shorthand. She trained as a nurse at Leeds General Infirmary from 1932 to 1936, graduating from the Royal College of Nursing, London. She moved with her parents to Clonliffe Road, Drumcondra, Dublin in 1937 and she successfully auditioned for the Abbey Theatre's School of Acting.There she studied alongside Wilfred Brambell, Valentine Iremonger, Phyllis Ryan, Dan O'Herlihy, and briefly, Maureen O'Hara.

== Career ==
Boylan wrote up a profile of Lennox Robinson, the director of the School, for The Irish Press (30 September 1937). These occasional writing jobs helped to pay her school fees. Robinson chose her as part of a group to create a verse-speaking class, and Boylan appeared as Deirdre in the radio play Deirdre of the sorrows by J. M. Synge on Radio Éireann. She was one of the original members and honorary secretary of the Dublin Verse-Speaking Society, founded in December 1939 by Austin Clarke and Robert Farren. Boylan gave poetry recitals at the Abbey and Peacock theatres, as well as appearing on the Monday night poetry show, Poetry Anthology, on Radio Éireann for 25 years. She met Henry Boylan in Radio Éireann in 1941, and they married on 18 September 1941 in Dublin. They had two daughters, Anna and Catherine, and two sons, Hugo and Peter.

She worked as an editorial assistant for Woman's Life, ghost writing an agony aunt column and managing beauty pageants. Boylan was a regular contributor on talk shows and Radio Éireann productions from the 1940s onwards. She wrote as "Darina" for The Irish Press social column, contributed to The Hibernia Magazine, was the editor of Creation, and wrote for The Irish Times, the Irish Press, the Irish Arts Review and Books Ireland. She published a book on the history of the United Arts Club, All cultivated people: a history of the United Arts Club, in 1988, and a memoir, Gaps of brightness, in 2003. She was a member of the Irish Contemporary Arts Society. Boylan died on 23 February 2006 in Dublin.
