= Jan de Fouw =

- Born: 15 July 1929; The Hague
- Died: 1 February 2015 (aged 85)
- Occupation: Visual artist, designer, graphic artist, illustrator

Jan de Fouw (15 July 1929 – 1 February 2015) was a Dutch graphic designer and illustrator who lived and worked in Ireland. He was influential on Irish design in the 20th century.

== Early life ==
Jan de Fouw was born in The Hague on 15 July 1929. He was one of three sons to Adriaan de Fouw and Jacoba Kramer. Initially de Fouw studied at the Royal Academy of Art in The Hague where he learnt Bauhaus design principles. He then worked as a freelance designer for KLM Royal Dutch Airlines before undertaking military service from 1949 to 1951.

== Work as a designer in Ireland ==
In 1951 de Fouw moved to Ireland on the advice of Guus Melei, a former colleague at KLM, who had started working on the Aer Lingus account for Sun Advertising. Ireland was an attractive option because de Fouw was able to get a house with a garden, which was not as easily available in his home country in the aftermath of World War II. A small group of other Dutch graphic designers were also recruited to Irish advertising agencies such as Gerrit van Gelderen, Piet Sluis and Cor Klaasen.

As well as designing posters for Aer Lingus, de Fouw was the art director of Ireland of the Welcomes, from 1952 to 1996, a magazine published by the Irish Tourist Board, which promoted Ireland as a tourist destination to an international market. He was actively involved in many printmaking organisations in Dublin such as Graphic Studio Dublin, the Black Church Print Studio, and the National Print Museum. He was a member of ICAD (Institute of Creative Advertising and Design), a professional body which provided support and instigated debate within the advertising and design industry.

Working as a freelance designer in Ireland, de Fouw applied his knowledge of modern Bauhaus principles, using flat colours, grid layouts and sans-serif typography. These techniques were not commonly used in Irish design up to that point. Along with other Dutch designers, de Fouw helped to fill a gap in professional design standards that existed in Ireland at that time. According to the art historian, John Turpin, the work of this group, "crystalized the advent of modern design in Ireland."

== Later life ==
In 2001 at the age of 72, de Fouw was diagnosed with Parkinson's disease, which impaired his ability to draw. He began making sculptures as a creative outlet. He died on 1 February 2015.
