= Edinburgh International Magic Festival =

Edinburgh International Magic Festival, also known as MagicFest, is an annual arts festival which takes place in Edinburgh, Scotland in the first week of July each year.

MagicFest was founded in 2010 by Magician Kevin McMahon and events organiser Svetlana Shevchenko. In 2011 the Magic Festival featured Paul Wilson from BBC The Real Hustle, Paul Daniels, Rob James, Romany, the Diva of Magic and John Archer.

== Venues ==
Principal venues are Summerhall and the Royal Lyceum Theatre. MagicFest events have also taken place at the Scottish Storytelling Centre, the Royal Scots Club, The Pleasance, The Stand Comedy Club, the Edinburgh Filmhouse and Camera Obscura.

== The Great Lafayette Award ==
In 2011 the festival introduced the Great Lafayette Award, which honours magicians who have excelled in live stage performances. The award is named after world-famous magician The Great Lafayette, who died 100 years earlier in the Edinburgh Festival Theatre in 1911. The first award was won by UK magician Paul Daniels. In 2012 the award was won by Ukrainian performer Yevgeniy Voronin. In 2018 the creative illusionist duo Magus Utopia (Marcel Kalisvaart and Aquila Junior) received the honour to win this award.
