= National Maternity Hospital, Dublin =

National Maternity Hospital
- Health Service Executive
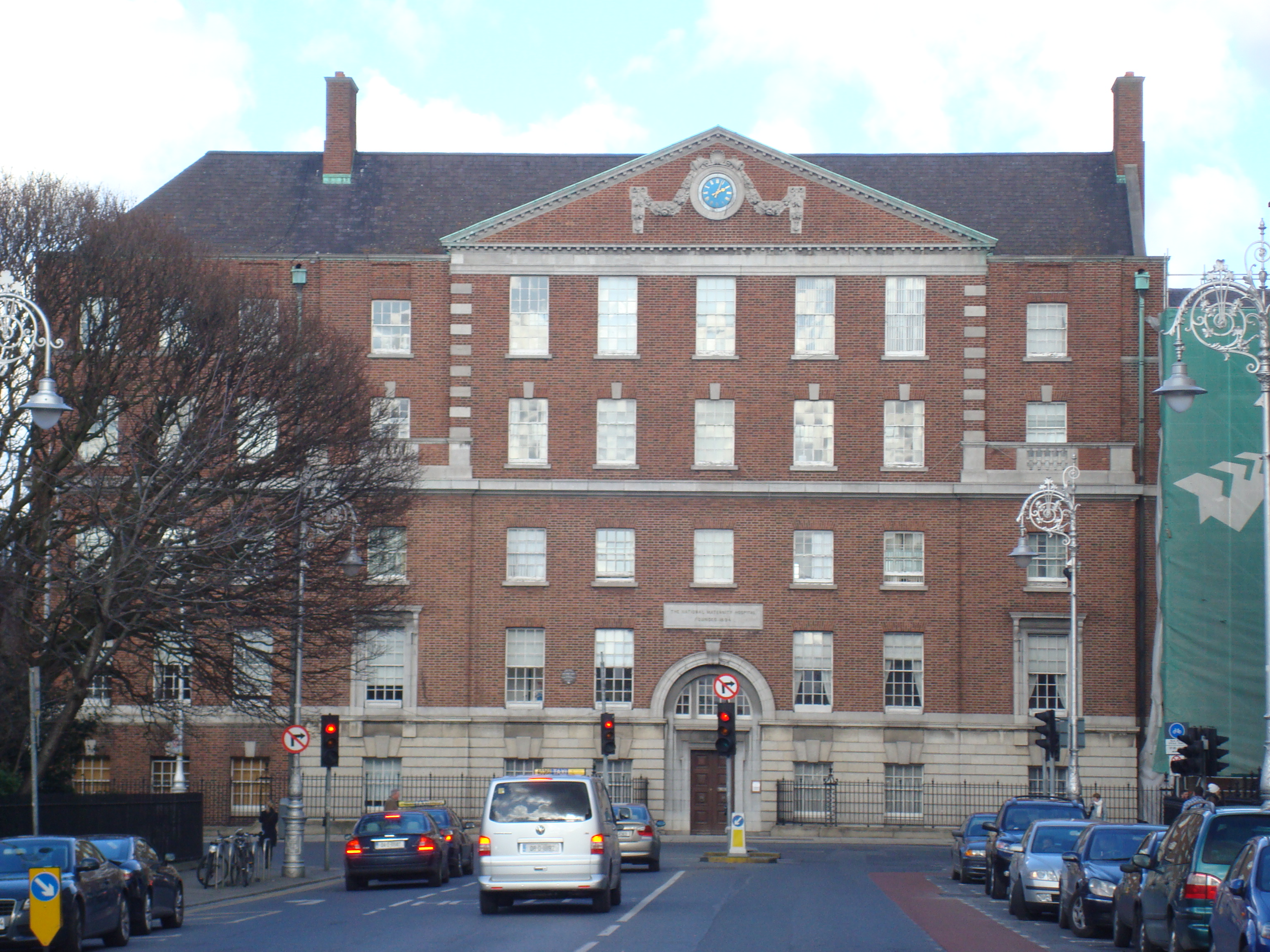
- National Maternity Hospital, Ireland

- Shown in Dublin

Geography
- Location: Dublin, Ireland
- Coordinates: 53.339681°N 6.246308°W

Organisation
- Care system: Health Service Executive (HSE)
- Type: Specialist

Services
- Emergency department: Yes
- Speciality: Maternity hospital

History
- Founded: 1894; 132 years ago

The National Maternity Hospital (Irish: An tOspidéal Náisiúnta Máithreachais), popularly known as Holles Street Hospital, is a large maternity hospital in Ireland. It is at the eastern corner of Merrion Square, at its junction with Holles Street and Lower Mount Street in Dublin. It is managed by Ireland East Hospital Group.

== History ==
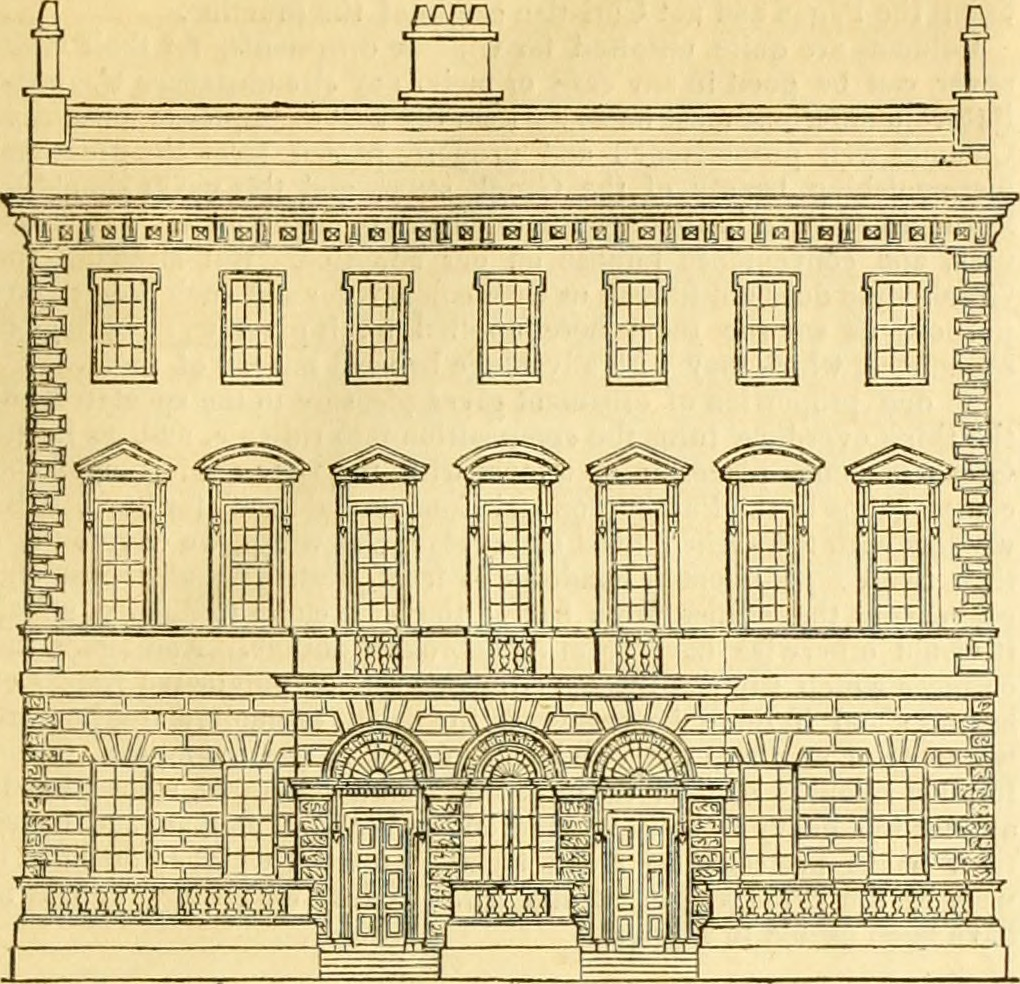
An illustration of Antrim House prior to demolition

The hospital was established through charitable donations in 1894 and received a royal charter, in line with other maternity hospitals in Dublin, in 1903. The Linen Guild, a charity to help mothers and babies in need of financial assistance, was established in 1912.

The hospital became the first such facility to benefit from the Irish Hospitals' Sweepstake which funded extensive redevelopment in the 1930s. Antrim House, the former home of the Earls of Antrim on Merrion Square, was demolished to facilitate the construction of the hospital by G&T Crampton, in 1936. A new Charter was received in 1936 altering the governance of the hospital such that it was administered by a board consisting of the Archbishop of Dublin (or a representative) as chair of the board, the Lord Mayor of Dublin, two City Councillors and two nominees of the Minister of Health.

In 1998, Holles Street set up the Domino (Domiciliary Care In and Out of Hospital) and Home birth scheme through its team of community midwives. The National Maternity Hospital Foundation, a charity which raises funds for a number of projects in the hospital with special emphasis on the neonatal intensive care unit, was established in 2012.

== Controversy over involvement of the Religious Sisters of Charity ==
In May 2013 it was announced that the hospital would relocate to the site of St. Vincent's University Hospital, Elm Park, a hospital founded by Mother Mary Aikenhead, foundress of the order Religious Sisters of Charity, in 1834.

The new hospital was projected to cost €300 million, and be paid for by the Irish state. The trust ownership of the hospital associated with the Sisters of Charity (an order of Catholic religious sisters) caused controversy. The Sisters of Charity had been involved in scandals related to abuse in Magdalene Laundries. The proposed hospital transfer raised questions about the role of the Catholic Church in Ireland in the provision of healthcare in Ireland.

In April 2017, a former Master of the NMH, Dr Peter Boylan, resigned from the board over the influence of the Sisters on the new hospital. By 3 May 2017, a petition to oppose their becoming the sole owners had been signed by more than 100,000 people. A protest of 200 people took place outside the Department of Health on 20 April 2017.

The then–Master of the National Maternity Hospital, Rhona Mahony stated that the hospital would be independent and "the nuns will not be running this hospital, it will not be under Catholic ethos. It will be completely independent", and privately complained that "the feminists are going to unravel this fantastic hospital for women".

The Bishop of Elphin, Kevin Doran said that the Religious Sisters of Charity would have to obey the rules of the Roman Catholic church if they became owners of the National Maternity Hospital, and to follow teachings on "the value of human life and the dignity and the ultimate destiny of the human person".

On 29 May 2017, in response to weeks of pressure and public outrage, the Sisters of Charity announced that they were ending their direct role in St Vincent's Healthcare Group and would not be involved in the ownership or management of the new hospital; the two sisters on the board resigned. Dr. Rhona Mahony, master of the National Maternity Hospital, said: "The religious Sisters of Charity never sought to have a role in the operation of the new hospital and even in the absence of the Sisters planned withdrawal from clinical healthcare in Ireland the operational independence of the new hospital was always guaranteed under the terms of the Mulvey agreement which underpins all ensuing legal arrangements."

In 2022, ownership of the order's shares in SVHG was transferred to a newly formed company, St Vincent's Holdings. Concerns continued to be expressed about control and procedures available should the transfer of the National Maternity Hospital go through, especially as statements indicated that some procedures would be performed only "where clinically indicated" - precluding in vitro fertilisation and elective sterilisation or abortion services.

The current board of the National Maternity Hospital consists of 12 men and 11 women.

== Controversy over mistaken abortion ==
In early 2019, a couple was advised that the baby the woman was carrying had a fatal foetal abnormality, Trisomy 18. An abortion was performed at the National Maternity Hospital sometime after 15 weeks. A series of genetic tests later found that was not the case, and that there had been a misdiagnosis. Aontú TD Peadar Tóibín stated that the family were shocked “by allegations that the medical professionals signing off on the abortions have a commercial interest in the companies that produced the fatally insufficient test”. Taoiseach Leo Varadkar indicated the government would conduct an independent review.

== Services ==
The hospital, which is the national referral centre for complicated pregnancies, and premature and sick infants, delivers over 7,000 babies per year. The number of births it handles has increased by 50 per cent since the early 1990s.

In June 2019, Holles Street Hospital began work on an extension to the labour and delivery unit while awaiting relocation to the new facility which was not expected to be completed until 2024.

== In popular culture ==
Chapter 14 of James Joyce's novel Ulysses is partially set at the hospital, where Bloom and Dedalus share drinks with medical students.

== Former masters ==
List of former Masters:

- 1885–1893 William Roe
- 1894–1908 P J Barry
- 1909–1922 Andrew J Horne
- 1923–1924 R T White
- 1924–1931 P T McArdle
- 1932–1941 J F Cunningham
- 1942–1948 Alex W Spain
- 1949–1955 Arthur P Barry
- 1956–1962 Charles F V Coyle
- 1963–1969 Kieran O’Driscoll
- 1970–1976 Declan Meagher
- 1977–1983 Dermot W MacDonald
- 1984–1990 John M Stronge
- 1991–1997 Peter Boylan
- 1998–2004 Declan Keane
- 2005–2011 Michael Robson
- 2012–2018 Rhona Mahony
- 2019–2025 Shane Higgins
- 2026–present Jennifer Walsh

=== Other notable staff ===
- Elizabeth O'Farrell, a member of Cumann na mBan, served as a midwife, training and working in Holles Street in the early years of the 20th century before carrying the white flag delivering the surrender at the Easter Rising in 1916.
