= Declan Qualter =

Irish hurler

Personal information
- Born: Galway, Ireland

Sport
- Sport: Hurling
- Position: Forward
Club
- Years: Club
- ? – present: St Vincents
Inter-county
- Years: County
- 2007 – present: Dublin
Inter-county titles
- Leinster titles: 0

Declan Qualter is a hurler for Dublin and St Vincents. Qualter was born in Galway and opted to play hurling for Dublin where he is currently based. Qualter studied in Athlone Institute of Technology where he played in Ryan Cup and Higher Education League Finals. He also won a Fergal Maher Cup medal with Athlone. In 2003 he captained the unsuccessful Athlone team in the Ryan Cup final. In that year he also won the Player of the Year award from the hands of Clare hurling manager Ger Loughnane. Qualter made his debut in the National Hurling League for Dublin in 2007 during the opening game against Kilkenny. The game finished on a draw with a final scoreline of 2–13 to 0–19. Qualter made his Championship debut for Dublin against Wexford in the 2007 All-Ireland Senior Hurling Championship.
