= Visual Artists Ireland =

Representative and support organisation for artists

VAI
- Visual Artists Ireland
- Ealaíontóirí Radharcacha Éire
- Formation: January 1, 1980; 46 years ago (as Sculptors’ Society of Ireland until 2005)
- Location: First Floor, 2 Curved Street, Dublin, D02 PC43, Ireland
- Services: Advocacy and information for professional artists in Ireland
- Members: Approx. 1500
- Website: visualartists.ie

Visual Artists Ireland (VAI, Irish: Ealaíontóirí Radharcacha Éire) is an advocacy, support, publishing, and information organisation representing professional visual artists on the island of Ireland.

== History ==
Founded in 1980 as the Sculptors’ Society of Ireland, the name was changed in 2005 as they began to include visual artists of all disciplines. Their current slogan describes VAI as "The Representative Body for Visual Artists in Ireland supporting artists at all stages of their careers". Noel Kelly has been the CEO/Director of the non-profit since 2007.

== Organisation ==
The VAI is a Company Limited by Guarantee run by paid staff under a voluntary board of professional artists, and primarily receives its funding by way of grants from the Arts Council. It also maintains a paid membership base of around 1,500 and raises money through side projects. Its income amounted to a little more than €500,000 in 2018.

== Activities ==
The VAI regularly holds professional development workshops and network building events throughout the island, including 'speed-curating' programmes, webinars, talks, "Artist Cafes", and "Helpdesks/Clinics". They offer residencies such as the Valerie Earley Residency Award and the Suki Tea Art Prize; and started granting a 'Hardship Award' in 2011.

=== Publication ===
VAI publishes a free newspaper, The Visual Artists' Newssheet, six times a year, as well as a twice weekly 'e-bulletin' advertising opportunities and exhibitions. They have also published reports on artists's incomes, Visual Artist Payment Guidelines, and the use of interns in the arts.

From 2003 until April 2012, the association published a guest-curated journal titled Printed Project multiple times a year. They have also tried app development, with the 'Artconnect app', made with artist Aideen Barry in 2012 and a social network, the 'Common Room Social Network for the Visual Arts', in 2010. They have previously administered arts studios grants on behalf of the Arts Council of Ireland.

=== Definition of professional artist ===
Additionally, the VAI has created a specific definition of what it deems to be a professional artist in Ireland, with any 3 out of 7 criteria met to qualify:

- "Degree or Diploma from a recognised third level college in Fine Art or an Associated Visual Arts Discipline
- One-person visual arts show(s) (including time based events) in a publicly funded (Arts Council, Local Authority, Government funded) visual arts space. Non-visual arts spaces do not qualify unless the exhibition is part of an acknowledged visual arts programme.
- Your visual arts practice had caused your participation in a visual art's exhibition/event which was selected by a jury in which professional artists or recognised curators participated.
- Your visual art work has been purchased by Government, local authority, museum or corporate client for inclusion in a recognised collection.
- Your visual art work has been commissioned by Government, local authority, museum or corporate client for inclusion in a recognised collection..
- You have been awarded a bursary, residency, materials grant or otherwise grant aided by the Arts Council/Arts Council of Northern Ireland or other funding body based on your visual arts practice..
- Have been awarded tax-exempt status based on your visual arts practice by the Revenue Commissioners, or are on schedule D as a self-employed artist in Northern Ireland."

== Campaigns ==
In 2015 the VAI researched and surveyed artists and galleries to discover that "in almost 80 per cent of cases artists received no fee for their participation" in exhibitions. They led a campaign titled: "Ask! Has the Artist Been Paid?" which led to the Arts Council requiring artists fees to all funded organisations. The organisation has been an active whistleblower on this issue, naming the National Gallery of Ireland as a culprit in not paying artists, even though the exhibition requires a paid ticket.

Launched in 2017 as part of an Irish government pilot scheme, and now a permanent one, artists can receive jobseeker's allowance as artists, with the VAI and the Irish Writers Centre officially determining eligibility. The VAI welcomed this move and reported that an important additional gain was that "it grants professional status, which in turn recognizes the special circumstances that artists encounter in their search for commissions and employment."

== Bibliography ==
- Maharaj, Sarat (Editor). Farewell to Post-Colonialism, Printed Project v. 11. Dublin, Ireland: Visual Artists Ireland, 2009.
- Kelly, Noel, Niamh Looney, and Jason Oakley. The Manual: A Survival Guide for Visual Artists. Dublin: Visual Artists Ireland, 2015. ISBN 9781907683138
- Kelly, Noel, and Sean Kissane. Creative Ireland: the visual arts, contemporary visual arts in Ireland 2000-2011. Dublin: Visual Artists Ireland / Printed Project, 2011. ISBN 9781907683114
- MacDonagh, Eileen. Meitheal: Sculpture Symposia Ireland. Dublin, Ireland: Sculptors Society of Ireland, 1988. ISBN 9780946549108
- Mirza, Munira (Editor). Artistic Freedom Anxiety and Aspiration, Printed Project v. 8. Dublin, Ireland: Visual Artists Ireland, 2008.
- A City Guide to Sculpture in Dublin. Dublin: Sculptors Society of Ireland, 1999. ISBN 9780946549153
- Shaw, Lytle (Editor). The Conceptual North Pole, Printed Project v. 14. Dublin, Ireland: Visual Artists Ireland, 2010. ISBN 9781907683107
- Vidokle, Anton and Tirdad Zolghadr (Editors). I Can't Work Like This, Printed Project v. 6. Dublin, Ireland: Visual Artists Ireland, 2007.
