= P. J. Qualter =

Irish hurler (1943–2019)

Personal information
- Native name: P. S. Mac Ualtair (Irish)
- Born: 1943 Turloughmore, County Galway, Ireland
- Died: 25 July 2019 (aged 76) Turloughmore, County Galway, Ireland
- Occupation: Secondary school teacher
- Height: 5 ft 11 in (180 cm)

Sport
- Sport: Hurling
- Position: Full-forward
Club
- Years: Club
- Turloughmore
Club titles
- Galway titles: 6
Inter-county
- Years: County
- 1966–1977: Galway
Inter-county titles
- All-Irelands: 0
- NHL: 1
- All Stars: 0

P. J. Qualter (1943 – 25 July 2019) was an Irish hurler who played for Galway Senior Championship club Turloughmore and at inter-county level with the Galway senior team. He usually lined out as a full-forward.

== Honours ==
Turloughmore

- Galway Senior Hurling Championship (6): 1961, 1962, 1963, 1964, 1965, 1966

Galway

- National Hurling League (1): 1974–75
