= Gubbarudda =

Gubbarudda Gob a' Roide
- Townland
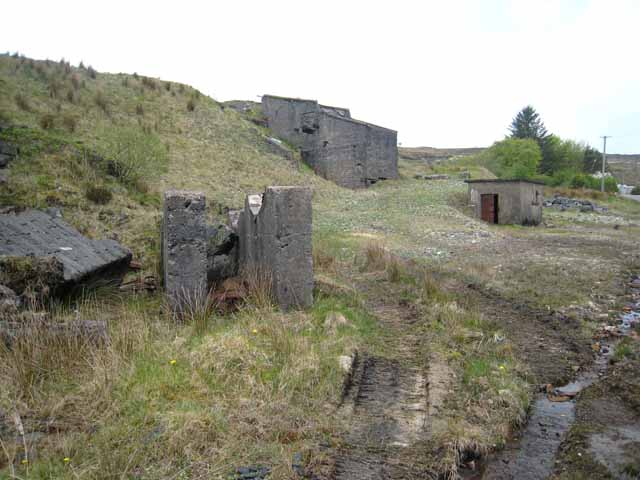
- Former mine at Gubbarudda

- Location in Ireland
- Coordinates: 54°05′36″N 8°10′06″W
- Country: Ireland
- Province: Connacht
- County: County Roscommon

Area
  - Total: 1.4367 km^{2} (0.5547 sq mi)
- Elevation: 297 m (974 ft)

Population (2012)
  - Total: 8
  - Density: 5.6/km^{2} (14/sq mi)
- Time zone: UTC+0 (WET)
  - Summer (DST): UTC-1 (IST (WEST))

Gubbarudda, formerly Gubberudda (Irish: Gob a' Roide) is a townland in County Roscommon, Ireland about 4.5 kilometres north-west from the village of Arigna. Gubbarudda is a very rural area composed of 432 acres with only two residences. Much of the northern parts of the townland encompasses Coillte woodlands, while its southern areas are situated on the 'Kilronan Mountain Bog Natural Heritage Area'. The population of Gubbarudda as of 2012 totaled eight people.

Gubbarudda borders County Sligo to the west, and the tripoint of counties Leithrim, Roscommon, and Sligo on the river Arigna is less than a kilometre away from its northern border. Neighbouring townlands are Greaghacorra to the north-east where the river Arigna forms the border, Aughabehy to the east, Greaghnageeragh and Cashel to the south, Rover, County Sligo to the west, and Glen, County Sligo to the west and north.

The name is composed of gubba, which is a corruption of ghob, the Irish for 'beak', describing the pointed shape of the land area, and rudda, which derives from the word rua meaning 'red', relating to the large quantities of iron minerals found in the vicinity.

The traditional Irish flautist Packie Duignan lived for a while in Gubbarudda in the house where his father grew up.

During the Great Famine a huge population decline was observed in every other townland in Arigna apart from Gubbarudda which enjoyed a slight population increase. There were five households in the townland in the year 1858. The population of Gubbarudda in the year 1901 was 26. Nonetheless, the townland's population was to decrease dramatically throughout the 20th century when locals either emigrated abroad or moved to larger, more populated areas such as Boyle, Carrick-on-Shannon and Sligo.

== Coal mines ==
Coal mines in Gubbarudda were documented in the 1837 Ordnance Survey Namebook. By 1858, a mine was owned by the McManus family which is mentioned in Griffith's Valuation. It was only open for three months of the year. The last functioning coal mine in Gubbarudda was owned by the Flynn family and closed in 1991. There remains widespread evidence to this day that local families dug for coal on their own lands. These mines were known as prochógs or pruchas ("holes").
