= Amy Molloy =

Irish actress

- Born: Belfast, Northern Ireland, UK
- Occupation: Actor
- Years active: 2008–present

Amy Molloy is a Northern Irish actress born in Belfast, Northern Ireland. She resides in London.

== Career ==
Molloy's work on screen includes; Animals, Call the Midwife, '71, The Fall and the screen adaptation of John Banville novel The Sea, as well as the Royal Court Theatre film of Cyprus Avenue for BBC Four (2020) by David Ireland, opposite veteran actor Stephen Rea. Amy Molloy most recently played Private Sarah Jane, opposite Rory Kinnear, Anthony Boyle and Lola Petticrew in Disney/FX series Say Nothing based on the book of the same name by Patrick Radden Keefe. In 2025, she completed filming on Chasing Millions, playing Quinn, opposite Christopher Eccleston.

Amy Molloy can also be seen as the lead in BBC Comedy Short Spinster, which has been nominated for Best Comedy at the 2025 RTSNorthern Ireland Television Awards.

She was nominated for Best Actor in a Female Role at the Richard Harris International Film Festival 2020, for her lead role as Rosie Curran, in the short film Bound. Her performance also earned her a special mention at the Cork International Film Festival in 2019, with Film Ireland remarking that her "powerful performance carries the film".

Molloy plays Holliday Grainger's sister in the 2019 film Animals 2019. Variety described her performance as ‘tamed wild child’ Jean as "excellent" when the film premiered at Sundance Film Festival. The Telegraph also noted her performance in their 4 star review of the film.

== Theatre career ==
Her theatre career includes; work for the Royal Court Theatre London, Abbey Theatre and Public Theater NYC, in the original and shocking dark comedy, Cyprus Avenue, playing opposite actor Stephen Rea, originating the role of his daughter Julie. The production was screened on BBC Four in 2019 and via Royal Court Theatre online, in 2020. It was listed in the Top 50 Plays of the 21st Century, by The Guardian.

In 2022 Amy Molloy was nominated for Best Female Performance by the Critics Awards for Theatre in Scotland, for her solo performance in This Is Paradise by writer Michael John O’Neill, at Edinburgh Fringe Festival 2021 and 2022, on both Traverse theatre stages.

Receiving rave reviews, the performance and production garnered five stars by the Scotsman and many other publications and was praised across the board, variously described as a performance of “fierce, fragile strength and subtlety”, both “captivating” (The Skinny) and a “hypnotic” (The Stage), “spellbinding performance” (The Times) and “superbly performed” (The List), by “an excellent Amy Molloy” (The Guardian). The National wrote, “an exceptional Molloy..a bravura, emotionally dexterous and deeply moving performance...one of the most moving and convincing evocations of personal trauma witnessed, in 30 years as a theatre critic”.

In 2023, she teamed up with the same writer again in the play Akedah, performed at the Hampstead Theatre and was nominated for the 2023 Offie for Best Lead Performance, giving a “magnetic central performance” (The Stage), with The Guardian noting, “...the tremendous Amy Molloy reappears in this O’Neill play, as the nerve-shot Gill...a dark symphony of flinches and flails”.

At the end of 2019, she appeared as Bridget in Translations by Brian Friel at the Royal National Theatre London, in a production directed by Ian Rickson, with a cast including Ciaran Hinds. That same year, her solo performance as Aoife in Cotton Fingers by Rachel Tresize at the Edinburgh Fringe Festival 2019, won her praise for her performance of a young woman from Belfast having to travel alone to terminate a pregnancy in Wales. She won a Lustrum Award for excellence and the show was listed as one of The Stage ‘Best Shows at the Edinburgh Fringe, 2019’.

Molloy has appeared on stage at the Abbey Theatre Dublin and the Brooklyn Academy of Music, New York in a revival and new adaptation of Ibsen's John Gabriel Borkman by Frank McGuinness, which starred Alan Rickman, Fiona Shaw and Lindsay Duncan.

Molloy has also worked for the prestigious Druid Theatre Company Ireland, starring alongside Tony Award Winner Marie Mullen as her daughter Susanne, in 2024's Gaiety Theatre production of “The House” by Tom Murphy. 2025 saw Amy Molloy return to the Dublin Theatre Festival to play the Mother Carol, in Shane O’Reilly’s ambitious new play and opera Her Fathers Voice,about a young Deaf girl Sarah, on the verge of cochlear implant surgery directed by Annabelle Comyn. She has also played Louise Kendall in the Gate Theatre, Dublin production of My Cousin Rachel, in an original dramatic adaptation by Joseph O’Connor.

In 2015, Molloy's performance in one woman show, Tea Set, at the Edinburgh Festival Fringe Scotland, The Pleasance Courtyard, was one of Lyn Gardner's top ticket picks and The Guardians Top Tickets, describing her performance as "packing a wallop" and "perfectly judged". The Scotsman ranked it as "one of the top rank performances to be seen at the Fringe" that year. Molloy was asked to write an article for the online branch of The Scotsman, on the play and its topics of loneliness, isolation and grief, teaming up with Age Scotland in order to raise awareness for Silverline and other local charities.

== Filmography ==
| Year | Title | Role | Notes |
|---|---|---|---|
| 2013 | Black Ice | Moya Shine | Dir. Johnny Gogan |
| 2013 | The Sea | Shopgirl Sadie | Dir. Stephen Brown |
| 2014 | '71 | Mother in Raided House (Bernadette) | Dir. Yann Demange |
| 2019 | Animals | Jean | Dir. Sophie Hyde |
| 2019 | Cyprus Avenue | Julie | Dir. Vicky Featherstone |
| 2021 | Love Without Walls | Debbie Kelly | Dir. Jane Gull |
| 2025 | Chasing Millions | Quinn | Dir. Stephen Burke |

=== Television ===
| Year | Title | Role | Notes |
|---|---|---|---|
| 2014 | Call the Midwife | Phoebe Doyle | BBC, Episode #3.6 Trivia, 32nd actress to act out a birth on the long-running series |
| 2014 | 50 Ways to Kill Your Lover | Lesley Howell | Episode #1.7 Killer Dentist, Crime Drama |
| 2016 | The Fall | Nurse Lyle | BBC Two, Episode #3.1 Silence and Suffering, Dir. Allan Cubitt |
| 2022 | Bloodlands | Louise Foyle | BBC Episode #2.3, Dir. John East |
| 2024 | Say Nothing | Private Sarah Jane | Disney/FX, Dir. Michael Lennox, Mary Nighy, Anthony Byrne |
| 2024 | Borderline | Lottie Mullen | ITV and MGMplus on Prime Video, Episodes 5 and 6, Dir. Mark Brozel |
