= Steve Burke =

Steve Burke or Stephen Burke may refer to:

- Steve Burke (baseball) (born 1955), former Major League Baseball pitcher
- Steve Burke (businessman) (born 1958), Chairman of NBCUniversal
- Steve Burke (footballer) (born 1960), English former footballer
- Steve Burke (composer) (born 1974), British video game composer, sound designer and voice actor
- Steve Burke (footballer, born 1988), English footballer for Bury and Mossley, see List of Bury F.C. players (1–24 appearances)
- Steve Burke (One Life to Live), a soap opera character
- Stephen Burke, journalist and editor-in-chief of GamersNexus

== See also ==
- Steven Burke (born 1988), English track and road cyclist
- Stephen Burke, Irish film director
