= Chasing Millions =

Upcoming film by Stephen Burke

- Theatrical release poster
- Directed by: Stephen Burke
- Written by: Stephen Burke; Katherine Thomson
- Produced by: Jane Doolan; Michael Wren
- Starring: Madeleine Madden; Christopher Eccleston; Tom Vaughan-Lawlor; Ger Ryan
- Cinematography: Owen McPolin
- Edited by: Chris Plummer
- Music by: Jim Moginie
- Production companies: Mammoth Films; Invisible Republic
- Distributed by: Vendetta Films (Australia); Eclipse Pictures (Ireland)
- Release date: 9 October 2026 (Ireland)
- Running time: 101 minutes
- Countries: Ireland; Australia
- Language: English

Chasing Millions is a 2026 crime thriller film directed by Stephen Burke and starring Christopher Eccleston and Madeleine Madden. The film Irish-Australian co-production, centres on the real-life 2004 Northern Bank robbery in Belfast, one of the largest bank robberies in the history of the United Kingdom and Ireland.

== Premise ==
The film is loosely based around the investigation into a real-life bank robbery in Belfast that took place in December 2004 and saw £26 million stolen from the Northern Bank, one of the largest known bank robbery in British and Irish history.

== Cast ==
- Madeleine Madden as Diana
- Christopher Eccleston
- Tom Vaughan-Lawlor
- Ger Ryan
- Adam Best
- Amy Molloy
- Ciarán Dowd
- Kerri Quinn
- Charlie Bonner
- Benjamin Reilly
- Hannah Magee
- Aine Collier

== Production ==
The film is an Irish-Australian co-production. It was directed by Stephen Burke and produced by Mammoth Films and Michael Wrenn of Invisible Republic. It was co-written by Burke with Katherine Thomson. Finance support came from Screen Ireland and Screen Australia.

The cast is led by Madeleine Madden and Christopher Eccleston. The cast also includes Adam Best, Amy Molloy, Ciarán Dowd, Kerri Quinn, Tom Vaughan-Lawlor, Benjamin Reilly, Ger Ryan and Charlie Bonner.

Principal photography took place in Dublin and Dundalk, Ireland, in June 2025.

Original music for the series comes from musician Jim Moginie of the Australian band Midnight Oil.

== Release ==
The film was released in Ireland on 9 October 2026, and was released in Australian cinemas on 19 November 2026.
