= Duignan =

- Pronunciation: English: /ˈdaɪɡnən/ DYGHE-nən; Irish: [oː ˈd̪ˠiːɟən̪ˠaːnʲ]
- Language: English

Origin
- Meaning: Descendant of Dubhgeannán
- Region of origin: Ireland, especially around County Sligo

Duignan (Irish: Ó Duígeannáin, archaicly Ó Duibhgeannáin) is an Irish surname, and may refer to:

- Noel Duignan (born 1948), Canadian politician
- Packie Duignan (died 1992), Irish flute player
- Michael Duignan (born 1968), Irish hurling manager
- Michael Duignan (bishop) (born 1970), Irish Catholic bishop
- Seán Duignan (born 1936), Irish journalist
- Dr John Duignan (born 1946), Scottish writer

== See also ==
- Ó Duibhgeannáin
