= The Sea (2013 film) =

- Promotional Poster
- Directed by: Stephen Brown
- Screenplay by: John Banville
- Based on: The Sea, a novel by John Banville
- Produced by: David Collins; Michael Robinson; Luc Roeg
- Starring: Rufus Sewell; Natascha McElhone; Ciarán Hinds; Sinéad Cusack; Bonnie Wright
- Cinematography: John Conroy
- Edited by: Stephen O'Connell
- Music by: Andrew Hewitt
- Production companies: Rooks Nest Entertainment; Samson Films; Quicksilver Films; RTÉ; Broadcasting Authority of Ireland; Irish Film Board; BBC Films
- Distributed by: Independent
- Release date: 23 June 2013 (EIFF)
- Running time: 87 minutes
- Countries: Ireland; United Kingdom
- Language: English

The Sea is a 2013 British-Irish drama film directed by Stephen Brown. It is based on the novel of the same name by John Banville, who also wrote the screenplay for the film. The film premiered in competition at the Edinburgh International Film Festival on 23 June 2013. The film had its North American premiere at the 2013 Toronto International Film Festival.

== Premise ==
The story of a man who returns to the sea where he spent his childhood summers in search of peace following the death of his wife.

== Cast ==
- Ciarán Hinds as Max Morden
- Charlotte Rampling as Miss Vavasour
- Natascha McElhone as Connie Grace
- Rufus Sewell as Carlo Grace
- Sinéad Cusack as Anna Morden
- Matthew Dillon as Young Max
- Bonnie Wright as Rose
- Ruth Bradley as Claire
- Karl Johnson as Blunden
- Missy Keating as Chloe Grace
- Padhraig Parkinson as Myles Grace
- Fionnuala Murphy as Max's Mother
- Jay Villiers as Serge
- Lalor Roddy as Waiter
- Fred Paul McCloskey as Barman
- Stephen Cromwell as Young Tough (Mick)
- Amy Molloy as Shop Girl (Sadie)
- Mark Huberman as Jerome (uncredited)

== Production ==
The producer of the film Luc Roeg said that "I've wanted to make a film of John Banville's haunting and soulful novel for several years and it's been worth the wait. I'm excited to introduce a new film maker, Stephen Brown, to world cinema and I couldn't be more delighted with the cast and crew we've assembled together with our producing partners at Samson Films."

Filming started in September 2012 and finished in January 2013.

== Reception ==
The Sea premièred at the 2013 Edinburgh International Film Festival and received mixed reviews. Rating it at 7/10, the Screenkicker website said "intimate, superbly acted meditation on grief and abandonment that will make you think about how we cope with tragedy". Marc Adams, chief film critic of Screen Daily wrote, "the film's emotional still waters run deep and the film is gently watchable as a series of fine actors deliver nuanced and powerful performances." Guy Lodge of Variety wrote "This good, middlebrow adaptation of John Banville's Booker Prize-novel sacrifices structural intricacy for Masterpiece-style emotional accessibility." And added "Afforded the least, but most searing, screen time are Anna's final days, which economically imply longer-running problems in Max’s marriage. In a uniformly strong cast, a superbly terse Cusack cuts that little bit deeper as a dying woman who understandably has no time for her husband’s hovering pain."

Local response was less favourable. Niki Boyle of Film List, a Scottish web magazine, gave the film two out of five stars and said that "Hinds and Rampling are suitably low-key, and character actor Karl Johnson puts in a decent turn as a more poignant version of The Major from Fawlty Towers, but the whole thing feels utterly derivative, from the contrast between the muted-palette and light-saturated flashbacks, to the spare, mournful piano-and-violin score." Rob Dickie of "Sound on Sight", praised the performance of cast but criticise the pace and climax of the film by saying that " the pace is lethargic, there are no surprising revelations and the ending is horribly anticlimactic, meaning the strong performances and flashes of visual flair go to waste."

Ross Miller of Thoughts on Film gave it 1 out of 5 stars, saying that, "What could have been a fascinating and melancholic look at memory, regret and loss is actually a boring and monotonous character drama... a pretentious mess that's a chore to sit through." Emma Thrower of The Hollywood News also gave film a negative review by saying that "A frustrating blend of wooden and naturalistic, it is a surprise to realise author John Banville is responsible for a screenplay that often unfolds like an overblown television drama. Rufus Sewell and Bonnie Wright also suffer in these laborious and often unwelcome instagram-filtered interludes, Sewell an incongruous pantomime villain and Wright an underused but ultimately ineffective screen presence."

The Sea also served as the closing film at "25th Galway Film Fleadh", at 14 July 2013. IconCinema listed The Sea at its Top 200 most anticipated films of 2013.

== Accolades ==
Year	Award	Category	Recipient	Result
2013	Edinburgh International Film Festival	Audience Award Nominee		Nominated
2014	IFTA Award	Best Actress in a Supporting Role	Sinéad Cusack	Won
