= Carnagh West Ringfort =

Ringfort, County Roscommon, Ireland

- Ráth na Carnaí Thiar (Irish)
- Location within Ireland
- 53.513346°N 8.044055°W
- Type: ringfort
- Location: Carnagh West, Lecarrow, County Roscommon, Ireland

History
- Built: Stone Age (before 2000 BC)

Site notes
- Elevation: 59 m (194 ft)

National monument of Ireland
- Official name: Carnagh West
- Reference no.: 487

Carnagh West Ringfort is a ringfort and National Monument located in County Roscommon, Ireland.

== Location ==
Carnagh West Ringfort is located halfway between Lough Funshinagh and Lough Ree.

== History and description ==
Carnagh West Ringfort is a rath, or ringfort, featuring foundations of rectangular huts. The double-walling suggests a Stone Age date. The townland name is from the Irish carnach, "abounding in heaps/cairns", due to the large number of raths in the area.
