= Arigna =

Village in County Roscommon, Ireland

Arigna An Airgnigh
- Village
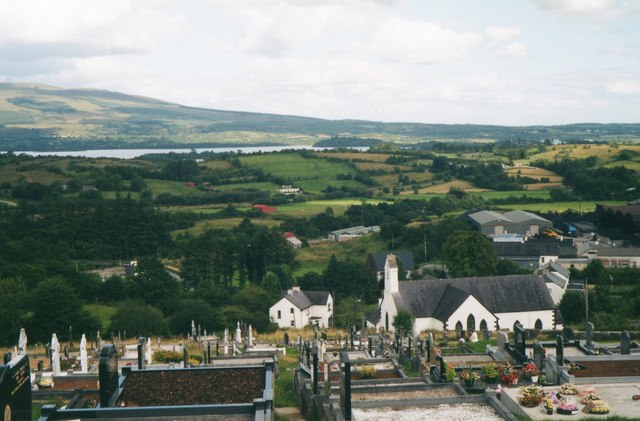
- Arigna looking towards Lough Allen

- Location in Ireland
- Coordinates: 54°04′40″N 8°06′20″W
- Country: Ireland
- Province: Connacht
- County: County Roscommon
- Elevation: 86 m (282 ft)
- Time zone: UTC+0 (WET)
  - Summer (DST): UTC+1 (IST (WEST))
- Irish Grid Reference: G931142

Arigna (Irish: An Airgnigh, formerly Carn an Ailt) is a village in the far north of County Roscommon in the west of Ireland. It is near Lough Allen (on the River Shannon), on a designated scenic route between Keadue and Sliabh an Iarainn. Arigna is situated in Kilronan parish, along with the villages of Keadue and Ballyfarnon. The area has a long association with the coal mining industry, carried out for over 400 years until the mines closed in 1990.

== Etymology ==
Arigna is an English corruption of An Airgnigh, meaning "the plundering", an adjective for the Arigna river - Abhainn An Airgnigh (Airignidh, Airgneach, Na hAirgne), the "plundering river". The Gaelic name for Arigna was Carn an Ailt ("Carn Analt").

".. Carn Analt in the valley of the Arigna river two and a half miles from the southern shore of the lake". "fifteen layers of soil and rock that form Cearn Alta". "Cearn Alta which is probably 1000 feet high".

Carn means "pile of rocks", and Ailt (also: ailt, alt) means "the steep-sided glen, height, cliff".

== Arigna coal mining ==
The Arigna coal mine was famous for its very shallow deposits. Seams of culm were worked by miners lying on their sides to shovel the coal out. Mining lasted until 1990, and the coal was used for ironworks and later for a power plant. With the demolition of the ESB generating station chimney, the era of collieries in the area ended.

The mining history at Arigna started in the Middle Ages with the mining of iron here, and at Sliabh an Iarainn. At the beginning of the 17th century, the iron was smelted at Arigna in newly built ironworks, using charcoal, which was burnt from the wood of the forests around. But as no organised tree planting took place and the timber eventually ran out, the ironworks had to be closed at the end of the 17th century. More than half a century later, in 1765, the mining of the coal deposits started, and again 30 years later the smelting was revived using the local coal instead of charcoal. These ironworks closed finally in 1838, as they were not very successful.

Demand for fuel in Dublin drove the industrial and economic development in the region. In 1790s Dublin, years of rising fuel inflation had driven the price of coal to 36-40 shillings per ton, causing "very great distress" to the inhabitants of Dublin. The completion of the Royal Canal allowed for the supply and sale of Arigna coal at 10 shillings per ton. New towns and villages emerged. Drumshanbo has its origin in these industries.

Coal mining continued and provided work for the people in the area. The coal was used to heat homes and hospitals and to power steam engines. In 1958 the Arigna 15MW Power Station was opened to produce electricity. It was the first major power generating station in Connacht. The station was built specifically to burn the semi bituminous coal with its high ash content. At its height, the power station burned 55,000 tonnes of coal per year and employed 60 people. Like in other coal mining areas of Europe, the main goal of this power station was to secure jobs in the local mining industry. During the internationalization process of the mid-20th century, foreign coal from much bigger and easier to mine deposits became much cheaper than local coal. The ESB proposed closure of the power plant in the 1980s, and without its main buyer, the mine closed in 1990, with the power station formally decommissioned in 1993.

Because of the thin coal seams, a special type of mining was practised at Arigna. A main tunnel was driven from which branched a series of secondary tunnels every 5–6 meters, where the coal was mined. The secondary tunnels followed the seams and were rather low. The miners typically worked lying on their back to cut the coal. These 'Cutters' or 'Brushers' also prepared the mine for the next day's work and extended the roads using explosives. 'Drawers' filled hutches (tubs) and pushed them out to the main underground mine road. Here the hutches were linked up to an endless-rope haulage system and were pulled to the outside. Sometimes small diesel locomotives were used to pull hutches out of the pit. 'Proppers' used timber pillars to prop up the mine roof.

=== Life inside the Mines ===
In his memoir, The Home Place, author Brian Leyden gives a description of life in the mines and describes the conditions in which the miners worked: "The coal mines were often tiny by the standard of most industrialised countries. The men often had to lie on their backs in water, using a handpick or short-handled shovel to get at a thin seam of coal under a ledge of rock."

Leyden describes how a religious picture was placed at the pit entrance and that the "coal-miners blessed themselves at this spot before they went underground. Strangers who visited the mines out of curiosity often found the experience of the mineshaft so frightening they never got past the picture".

=== Preservation ===
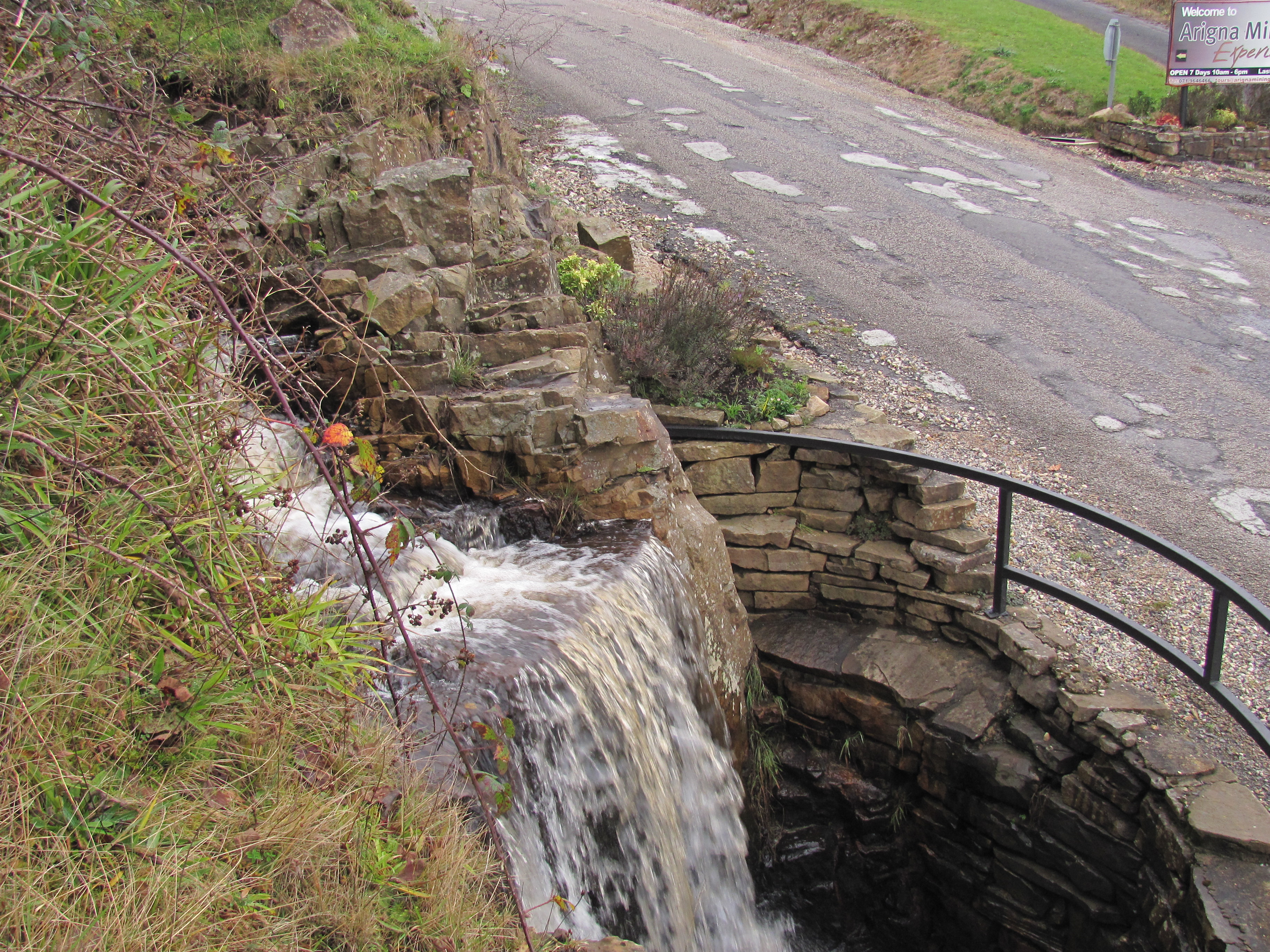
Water feature at the entrance to Arigna Mining Experience

The Arigna Mining Experience consists of an exhibition and an optional underground tour. The underground tour is guided by former miners, who are able to answer any questions on the coal mining process. This tour is a little difficult for some, as the mine is often somewhat low. There is no need to fear going down into the mine as the entrance and the whole mine tour is on a single flat level and wheelchair accessible. Visitor get hard hats to protect their heads. Lighting and sound effects throughout the mine are intended to add to the authenticity of the experience.

In April 2009, a musical celebration of Arigna's mining heritage, Scars On the Mountain was launched by RTÉ, Ireland's state broadcaster.

== Transport ==
Arigna railway station opened on 2 May 1888, but finally closed on 1 April 1959. It was part of the narrow gauge Cavan and Leitrim Railway.

== Notable people from Arigna ==
- Brian Leyden - Writer and author.
- Packie Duignan - Flautist.
- Peter and Mark Keaveney - Hairdressers and founders of Peter Mark.
- Peter Lynch - Irish politician and senator.

== See also ==
- List of towns and villages in Ireland
