= Moycarn =

Barony in County Roscommon, Ireland

Moycarn Maigh Charnáin (Irish)
- Barony
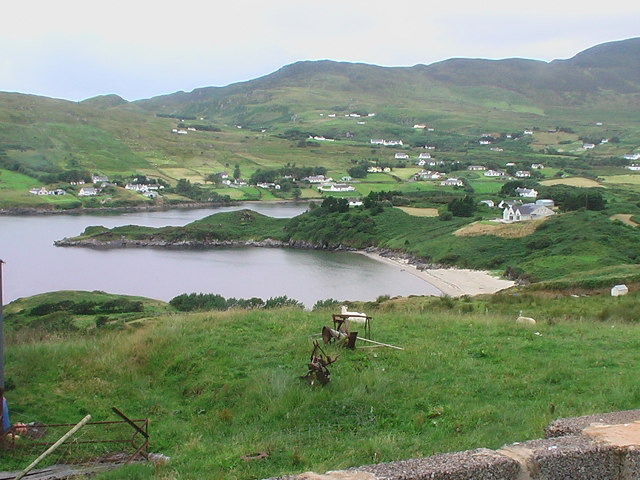
- Derrylahan, Moycarn

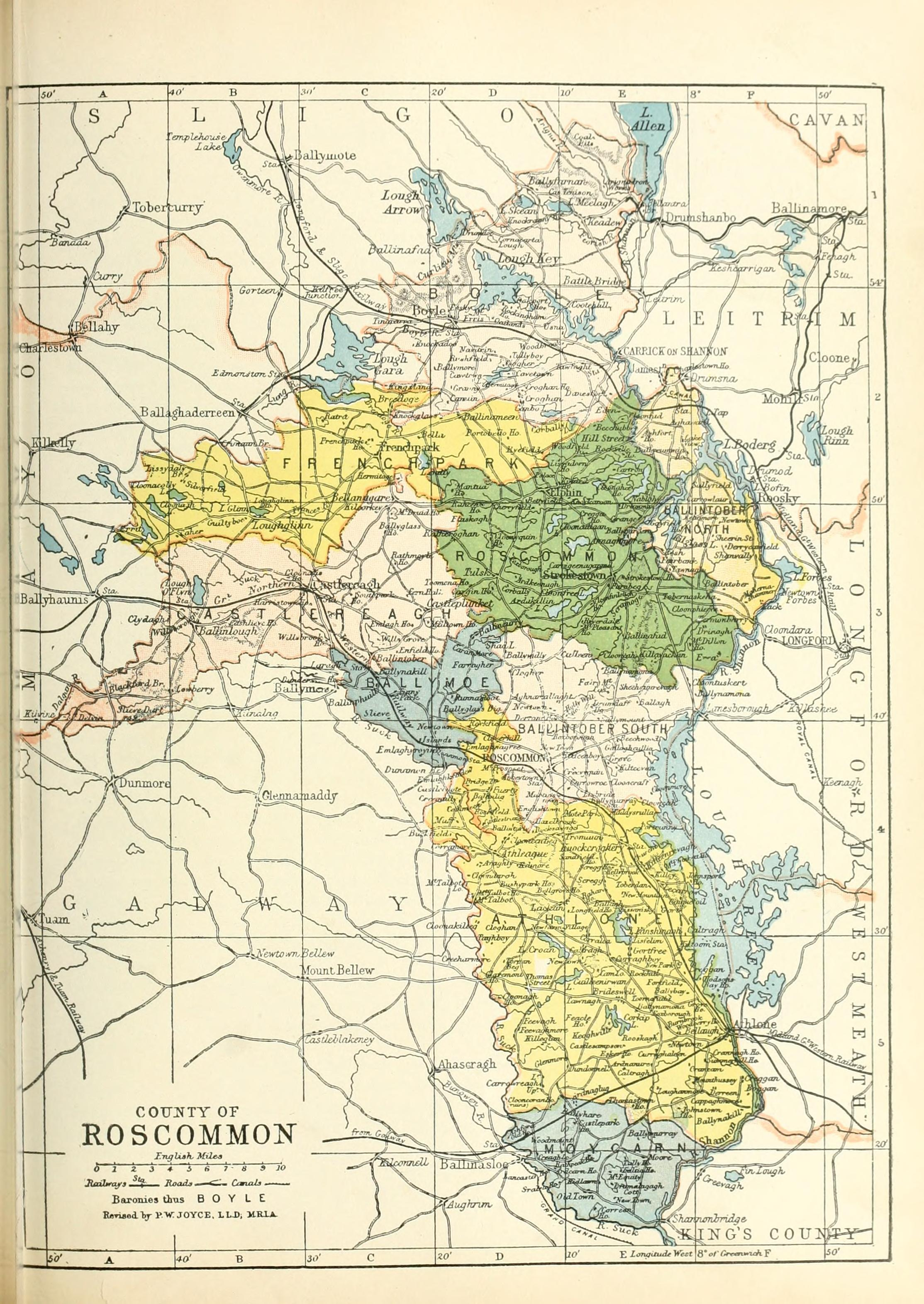
- Barony map of County Roscommon, 1900; Moycarn is coloured blue, in the south.
- Sovereign state: Ireland
- Province: Connacht
- County: Roscommon

Area
  - Total: 119.77 km^{2} (46.24 sq mi)

Moycarn (Irish: Maigh Charnáin; also Moycarnon, Moycarnanan or Moycarne ) is a barony in County Roscommon, Ireland.

== Etymology ==
The Irish name Maigh Charnáin means "plain of the cairn." It could also have a connection to Cernunnos, the Celtic hunt god.

== Geography ==
Moycarn barony is located in the south of County Roscommon, north of the River Suck and River Shannon; they meet at the southern tip.

== History ==
The Moycarn barony was anciently called Clan Laithemhain or Muintir Cionaith, ruled by the Gaelic Irish tribes of MacGilla Finnagain (O'Finnegan) and Ó Cionnaoith (Kenny).

It is referred to in the topographical poem Tuilleadh feasa ar Éirinn óigh (Giolla na Naomh Ó hUidhrín, d. 1420):

Mac Giolla Fionnagáin maoiṫ
Agus Clann crodha Cionaoith
Dá droing ar aoḃḋa d' feadain
Ar Cloinn laomḋa Laiṫeaṁain

("Mac Gilla Finnegan the mild and the valiant Clan Kenny: two tribes who are fair so be seen rule over the brave Clan Flahavan.")

Notable later families in the barony include the ffrench and Potts.

== List of settlements ==
Below is a list of settlements in Moycarn barony:

- Old Town
