= Seltannasaggart =

Mountain in Roscommon, Ireland

- Sailtean na Sagart; Corry Mountain
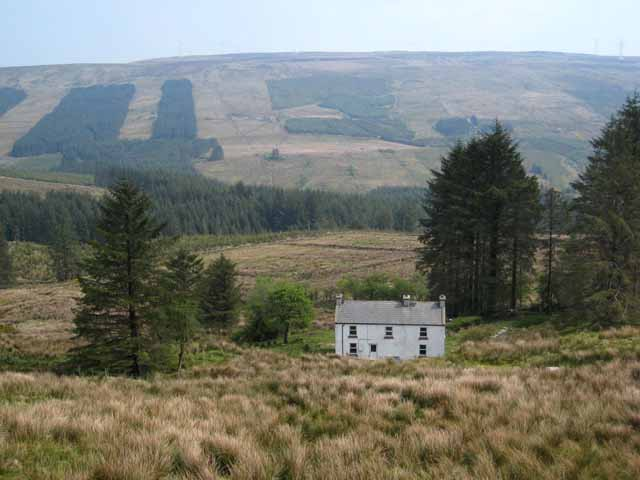
- Seltannasaggart from the southwest

Highest point
- Elevation: 428 m (1,404 ft)
- Prominence: 137 m (449 ft)
- Listing: County Top (Roscommon)
- Coordinates: 54°7′21″N 8°8′36″W

Naming
- English translation: willow plantation of the priests
- Language of name: Irish

Geography
- Location within Ireland
- Location: County Roscommon/County Leitrim, Ireland
- Parent range: Arigna Mountains
- OSI/OSNI grid: G908142

Seltannasaggart (from Irish Sailtean na Sagart, meaning 'willow plantation of the priests'), also called Corry Mountain, is a low mountain near Lough Allen on the border of County Roscommon and County Leitrim in Ireland; it is the highest point in Roscommon.

== Geography ==
The mountain is the highest point of County Roscommon. It is part of the Arigna Mountains and rises to a height of 428 metres (1,404 ft). On the southern slopes are the remains of a promontory fort and sweat houses.

== Access to the summit ==
There is a wind farm and a quarry on the summit, which is easily accessible. The Miners Way trail passes over it.

== See also ==
- Lists of mountains in Ireland
- List of Irish counties by highest point
- List of mountains of the British Isles by height
