= Arigna Mining Experience =

- Lárionad Lorg Mianadóireachta na hAirgní
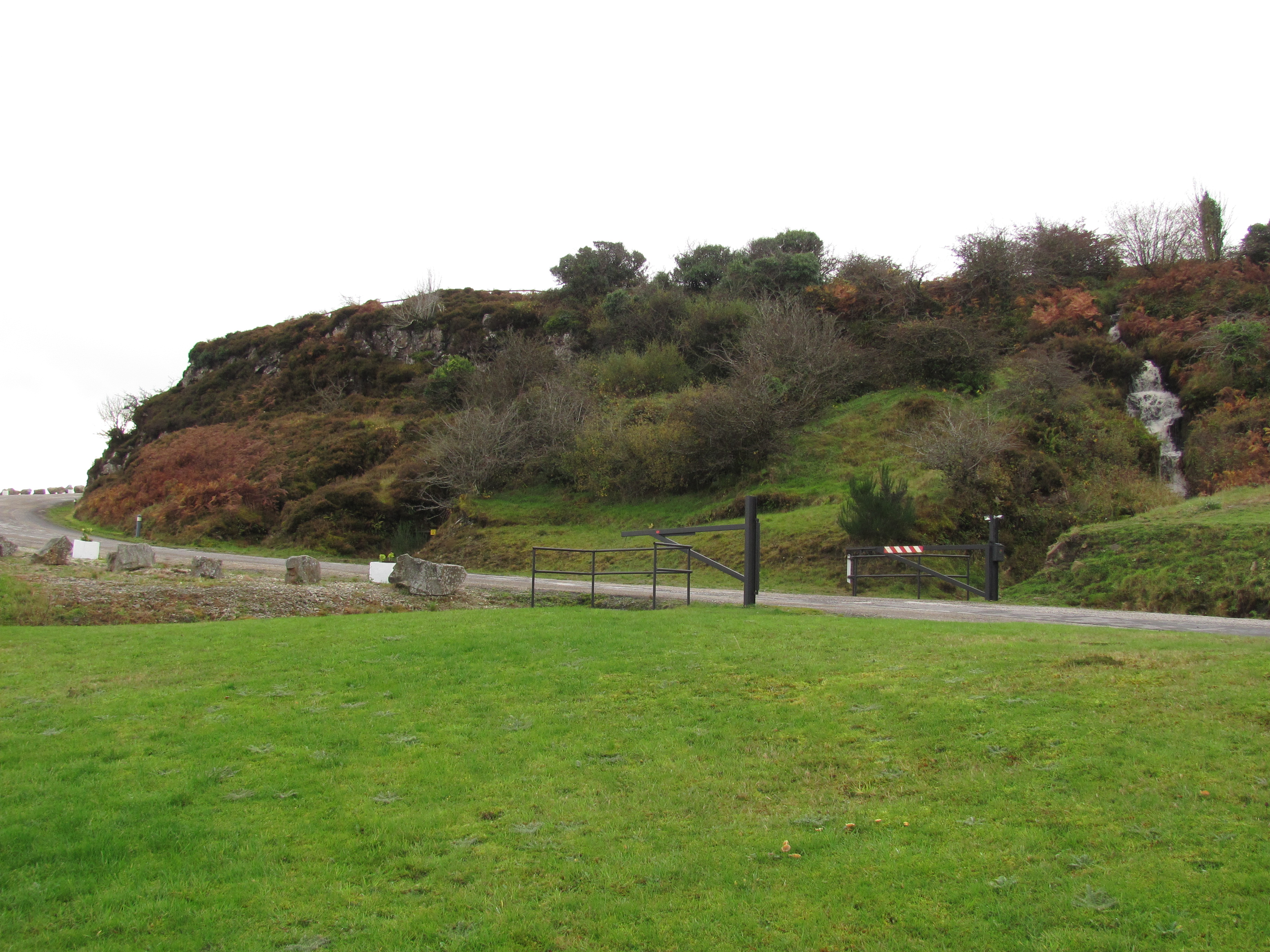
- The entrance in 2014

- Location within Ireland
- Established: 2003
- Location: Arigna, County Roscommon, Ireland
- Coordinates: 54.076614°N 8.117523°W
- Type: Coal mining museum
- Visitors: 350,000 since 2003
- Curator: Valerie Stenson
- Website: www.arignaminingexperience.ie

The Arigna Mining Experience is a centre dedicated to the coal mining history of Arigna over a period of 400 years, local geology and coal, as well as new forms of renewable energy. It is Ireland's first museum dedicated to coal mining.

== History ==
The history of mining in Arigna goes back to the 1700s, where coal was extracted from one of the narrowest seams known. Opened in the 1600s by Charles Coote, it changed ownership many times, including the United Irishmen the O'Reilly brothers, and then by local families. The Noone family from Sligo owned the mines from c1940-1970. Whereby it was run my Michael Noone & his brother Jack Noone. The coal was extracted originally for use in the processing of iron ore, as both nearby Sliabh an Iarainn and the Arigna River contain deposits the ore. Dublin's Ha'penny Bridge is made of Arigna iron. The mine served a purpose-built ESB station, which closed with the mine, when in 1992 the coal ran out.

== Exhibitions and tour ==
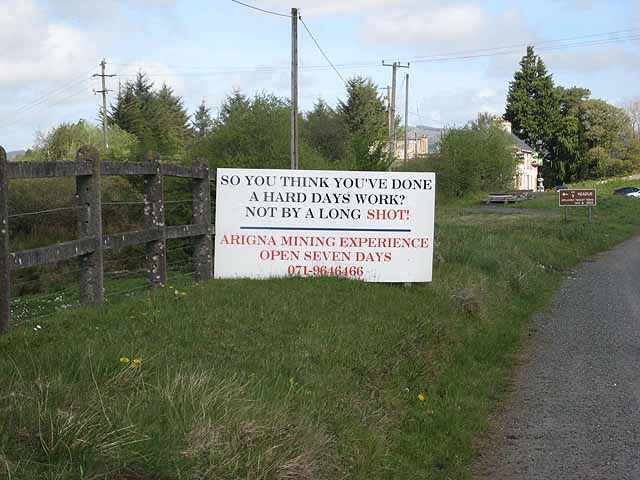
Arigna Mining Experience sign

With the closure of the mine in the 1990s, the site was redeveloped as a cultural destination. The tour includes a visit to the mines, with many of the tour guides being former miners. The tours bring visitors down into the mining main tunnel, which was only four feet high when it was used as a mine, but has been widened and deepened to allow for public access. As with the collections, the tour tells the social history of the mine, how miners worked, the rituals and customs of the mine, as well as its central role as the main employer in the area. The site also retains some spoil heaps, which demonstrate the scale of the mining that was taking place during the sites operation.

Much of the collections consist of mining paraphernalia dating from across the span of the mines activity. The exhibitions on the geology of the area cover the different formations that are found there, including sandstones, siltstones, mudstones and coal measures.
