= Brian Leyden =

Irish writer

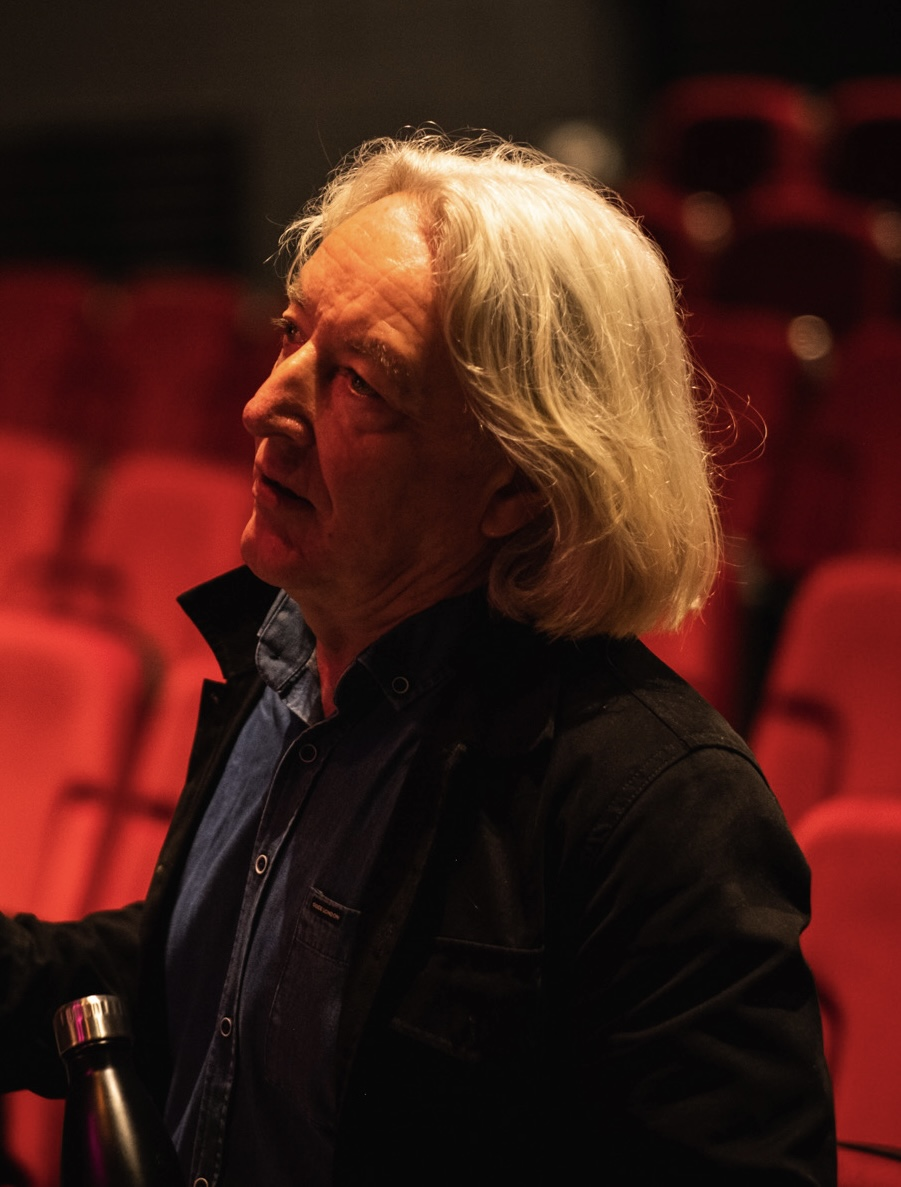
- Born: 1960 (age 65–66); Arigna, County Roscommon, Ireland
- Education: Lancaster University
- Occupations: Novelist, short story writer, screenwriter
- Writing career
- Language: English
- Notable works: The Home Place, Love These Days

Brian Leyden (born 1960) is an Irish writer. He has published three novels, two short story collections and a memoir. He has co-written a script for a feature film, made radio documentaries and is a regular contributor to Sunday Miscellany on RTE Radio 1. In 2021 Brian Leyden was one of the founders of independent regional publisher, Lepus Print.

== Life ==
Brian Leyden is from the coal mining valley of Arigna, County Roscommon, a place and a way of life memorialised in the author's work.

He secured a Masters in Creative Writing from Lancaster University in 2022 and was awarded a Postgraduate Diploma in Fine Art by the NCEA in 1983.

Leyden has been a creative non-fiction mentor with the MFA in Creative Writing at Carlow University Pittsburgh for twenty years.

He has worked continuously in the arts, including the positions of Writer in Residence with Leitrim and Sligo Libraries. He has mentored for the NUI Galway BA in Creative Writing program. Reading tours he participated in include Ireland and its Diaspora Writers & Musician's Tour of Germany (1996), Newport Festival Rhode Island, and The Irish Writers' Centre Peregrine Readings (2010) and New York in 2019.

Leyden writes fiction and non-fiction; he is engaged with the relationship between place and the creative calling.

He lives on the Atlantic coast of North Sligo with his wife.

== Books ==
- Love These Days (2024) novel
- Summer of ’63 (2016), novel.
- Sweet Old World: New and Selected Stories (2015), short stories.
- Death and Plenty (1996), novel.
- The Home Place (2002) memoir.
- Departures (1992), short stories.

== Recent Commissions ==
- The Sligo Wave, (2024) a writer's response to a major exhibition in the Model Arts centre on the Sligo Landscape tradition from Jack B. Yeats to present day artists.
- The Sheemore Ambush, (2020) for the Decade of Commemorations (2012–2023) initiative (2022).
- The Sligo Bus and All That Jazz, (2020) The Hawk's Well Theatre: Come together with writer Brian Leyden and musician Eddie Lee.
- Walking Bird Mountain, (2018/2019) Creative Ireland, Sligo, and the Factory Theatre multi-media collaborative arts project.
- Creative Ireland Award script commission for the 'Famine Attic' , (2018) Carrick-On Shannon, Co Leitrim.
- Old Flames, (2016) A script commission as National Writer in Residence for the Bealtaine Festival, and live performance tour with multi-instrumentalist Seamie O Dowd.

== Plays ==
- Remember Me, (2023) The Hawk's Well Theatre, Sligo.
- Ink and Lunacy, (1990), The Factory Theatre, Sligo.
- W.B Yeats: Experiments in Magic, (1989) St John's Church Theatre Listowel, Yeats Society, Co Sligo for the 50th anniversary of the poets death.

== Film ==
- Black Ice (2013) Premiered at the Jameson Film Festival, Dublin and the Model Sligo, before going to cinemas nationwide.

== Opera ==
- Humpty Dumpty (2010) A libretto for a short opera by contemporary composer Ian Wilson. performed at the Lancaster International Concert Series March (2010).

== Editorial Highlights ==
- The Cathach Volume II (2010) Sligo Library Services online literary Journal.
- First Cut Anthology, (2004)
- Force 10 Literary Journal, Issues 7-8, (1995-1997)

== Radio Documentaries ==
- The Irish Station Mass (2015)
- The Closing of the Gaiety Cinema (2004)
- Even the Walls Were Sweatin' (1997)
- No Meadows in Manhattan (1991)

== Other Radio Highlights ==
- BBC 4 Short Story, Departures (1990 and 2000)
- A Word in Edgeways (2022–2024)

== Essays and Anthologies ==
- Brian's non-fiction and essays have been broadcast on national radio and widely anthologised. Including Sunday Miscellany: A selection 2018-2023, ed. Sarah Binchy,' A Door Opening: Sligo and the Legacies of Partition, eds. Susan McKay and Keith Hopper (2023). Further essays are included in Winter Papers 2, and 8, (2016 and 2022) eds. Kevin Barry and Olivia Smith, Maugherow: beneath the blowing sands, ed. Sean Golden, (2022), Fermata: Writings inspired by Music, eds. Eva Bourke and Vincent Woods, (2016), Irlande 66/69 - Guy Jungblut and Jacques Piraprez/Nutan, (2016). His personal essays on other writers appear in Writing the Sky: Observations and Essays on Dermot Healy, ed. Neil Murphy and Keith Hopper, (2016), This Landscape's Fierce Embrace: The Poetry of Francis Harvey, ed. Donna L. Potts (2013). His fiction has been anthologised in Reading the Future: New Writing from Ireland, ed. Alan Hayes (2018) Stories for Jamie, ed. John Scally (2002), The Brandon Book of Irish Short Stories, ed. Steve Mc Donagh (1998), Irish Christmas Stories II, ed. David Marcus (1997) and The Alphabet Garden: European Short Stories, ed. Peter Ayrton (1994).

== Recognitions ==
- The Arts Council/An Chomhairle Ealaíon "Literary Bursary" (2014) and (2022)
- Culture Ireland Travel Award, USA, (2017)
- Broadcasting Authority of Ireland, Sound and Vision Award (2014)
- Sidney Brown Memorial Award (2012) for the musical adaptation Emerald. Music by Denise Wright. Book and lyrics by Chris Burgess. Based on the novel Death and Plenty by Brian Leyden.
- Sligo County Libraries Writer-in-Residence (2010)
- Norman Mailer Writers Colony (at Provincetown, MA) Scholarship (2009)
- Arts Council Travel & Training Award (2009)
- Jacobs Award for No Meadows in Manhattan (1991).
- Francis MacManus Short Story Award for The Last Mining Village (1988)
