= Jane McGrath (actress) =

Irish actress

Jane McGrath is an IFTA Award nominated Irish actress. She is best known for playing Garda Sharon Cleere in the Irish drama series Red Rock since 2015.

McGrath comes from Foxrock, outside of Dublin city. She graduated from the Gaiety School of Acting in 2009.

She starred opposite Killian Scott in Black Ice in 2013, having appeared in Pure Mule: The Last Weekend in 2009. She played Sissy, one of Craster's daughters, in the fourth season of Game of Thrones in 2014.
