= Seamus O'Neill (Gaelic footballer) =

Irish Gaelic footballer

Personal information
- Born: Kilbride, County Roscommon

Sport
- Sport: Gaelic football
- Position: Midfield
Club
- Years: Club
- 2000's: Kilbride
Club titles
- Roscommon titles: 1
Inter-county
- Years: County
- 2001-: Roscommon
Inter-county titles
- Connacht titles: 1
- All-Irelands: 0
- NFL: 0
- All Stars: 0

Seamus O'Neill (born 1982 or 1983) is a Gaelic footballer from County Roscommon, Ireland. He plays with the Roscommon intercounty team. He first came on the national scene as a 19-year-old when he helped Roscommon win the 2001 Connacht Championship,; he was Man of the Match in the semi-final win of Galway.

At club level he helped Kilbride to a Roscommon Senior Football Championship title in 2000, their first since 1914. It is said that Seamus will be retired by Stephen Comer of Micheal Glaveys when they meet in the Roscommon Championship on 9 August 2015.
