= Black Ice (2013 film) =

- Theatrical release poster
- Directed by: Johnny Gogan
- Written by: Johnny Gogan; Brian Leyden
- Produced by: Johnny Gogan; Trevor Curran; Nicky Gogan
- Starring: Jane McGrath; Killian Scott; Marian Quinn; Conor McDermottroe; Dermot Murphy; Roisin Scully; Amy Molloy
- Cinematography: Peter Martin
- Edited by: Patrick O'Rourke
- Music by: Glenn Garrett
- Production companies: Bandit Films; Still Films
- Distributed by: Studio North West
- Release date: 20 September 2013 (Ireland)
- Running time: 100 minutes
- Country: Ireland
- Language: English

Black Ice is a 2013 Irish racing thriller written and directed by Johnny Gogan. The film premiered in competition at the Dublin International Film Festival, and was subsequently distributed by Studio North West. The cast includes Jane McGrath, Killian Scott, Marian Quinn, Conor McDermottroe, Dermot Murphy, Roisin Scully, and Amy Molloy.

The film was nominated for the 2013 Dublin Film Critics Circle Award for Best Irish Film. For her performance, Jane McGrath was nominated for the Irish Film and Television Award for Best Actress.

== Cast ==
- Jane McGrath as Alice Watters
- Killian Scott as Jimmy Devlin
- Marian Quinn as Kate Watters
- Conor McDermottroe as Martin Watters
- Dermot Murphy as Tom Watters
- Roisin Scully as Carole O'Reilly
- Amy Molloy as Moya Shine
- Brian Leyden as Priest
- Gina Costigan as Sister
- Jason Matthewson as Declan O'Reilly

== Reception ==
The film received a mixed review. RTÉ's Alan Corr noted that while the film features strong performances, particularly from Jane McGrath as Alice and Killian Scott as Jimmy, it "never really shifts out of second gear." Corr highlighted the film's attempt to intertwine a forbidden romance with broader themes of economic decline and corruption but felt it lacked visual appeal, stating that "there is not much to recommend visually about Black Ice."

== Awards ==
Year	Association	Category	Nominee	Result	Ref.
2013	Dublin International Film Festival	Best Irish Feature Film	Johnny Gogan	Nominated	
2013	Galway Film Fleadh	Best Irish Feature Film	Johnny Gogan	Nominated	
2013	Dublin Film Critics Circle Award	Best Irish Film	Johnny Gogan	Nominated	
2014	Irish Film & Television Academy	Best Actress	Jane McGrath	Nominated	
