= Packie Duignan =

Irish flute player

Patrick "Packie" Duignan (5 May 1922 – 1992) was an Irish flute player.

== Life ==
He was born in Aughabehy, in the Arigna Mountains of County Roscommon, Ireland. Duignan started learning to play on a Clarke's whistle while listening to the 78s of John McKenna. His deep diaphragm driven rhythm was strongly influenced by McKenna. From 1958 to 1973, Duignan played in the Drumshanbo-based céilí band Shannon Star. He recorded an album for the Topic label, "Traditional Music from County Leitrim", with the fiddler Séamus Horan in 1978 some of whose tracks later appeared on the compilation CD, "Irish Traditional Music" by Temple Records. He also made many television and radio appearances. In his later years, Duignan mostly played in and around Drumshanbo, Keadue and Arigna with fiddler Séamus Horan and bouzouki player Ciarán Emmett.

Duignan was renowned for his sense of humour. In 1992, he died, following a short battle with leukemia; he had refused the aid of chemotherapy, saying he wanted to die as he had lived and not a shadow of his former self. He was buried with his flute in the Church of the Immaculate Conception's adjoining cemetery in the middle of Arigna alongside other immediate family members.

== Legacy ==
In 1995, a tribute CD was compiled of a concert featuring Tommy Guihen, Patsy Hanly, Mick Woods, and Joe Skelton at the Joe Mooney Summer School in Drumshanbo, called "A Tribute to Packie Duignan." An annual tribute weekend featuring many bands and players is held in Drumshanbo in late January. A memorial plaque in honour of Duignan is displayed in the centre of the town in the Main Car Park.

Duignan was a very well respected musician in the Lough Allen region, and his music continues to inspire people who have an interest in traditional folk music. Among a younger generation of flute and tin whistle players to cite Packie's influence are Catherine McEvoy and Mary Bergin.

== Festival ==
On 26 January 2007, the first official Packie Duignan Traditional weekend was launched by Comhaltas Drumshanbo. Following the opening of the Duignan memorial on Friday the 26th of January, there was a very successful session in Duignan's local pub Conway's corner house. On the Saturday there was a workshop in flute, tin whistle, bodhrán, fiddle, and Sean-nós dancing.

== Family ==
Packie had a very large family that is scattered across the midlands and the west of Ireland. His roots can be traced back to the O'Duigenan bards and scribes of Kilronan from the 13th century. Some of his family still live in the Arigna area but most have moved elsewhere, especially to England, Wales and America.

== Recordings ==
- Music From County Leitrim, with Seamus Horan(Flute) Topic 1978
- Traditional Music from County Leitrim
- Irish Traditional Music
- A Tribute To Packie Duignan
- Happy To Meet You Sorry To Part

In 2009 Bridie Morley/Duignan's Favourite recorded with Seamus Horan from Music from County Leitrim was included in Topic Records 70 year anniversary boxed set Three Score and Ten as track twenty four on the third CD.
