= John East =

John East (died 1856) was a 19th-century Anglican clergyman and writer.

At Oxford he was a friend of William Henry Havergal.

He became:

- Rector of Croscombe, Somerset (some of his earlier writings were published in Evesham so one wonders whether he may also have lived in that area)
- Curate of St Michael's, Bath
- Rector of St Michael's, Bath from 1843 (when the church became an independent parish for the first time since the Reformation) until his death.

St Michael's, Bath, was rebuilt in 1837 during East's time there.

In 1847 he recorded his impressions of the Great Famine of Ireland in his Glimpses of Ireland in 1847.

== Selected published works ==
(information mainly from COPAC)

- The Sabbath-Harp: A selection of sacred poetry (Bristol, 1823)
- The Village; or, Christian lessons: drawn from the circumstances of a country parish (Bristol, 1831)
- My Saviour; or devotional meditations in prose and verse, on the name and titles of the Lord Jesus Christ (Bristol, 1832)
- Peace in Believing, exemplified in a memoir of Ann, ... wife of the Rev. J. East (Bristol, 1837)
- Psalmody for the Church: a collection of Psalms and hymns adapted for public worship (Bath, 1838)
- Glimpses of Ireland in 1847 (London & Bath, 1847)
