= Peter Mark =

Irish hairdressing chain

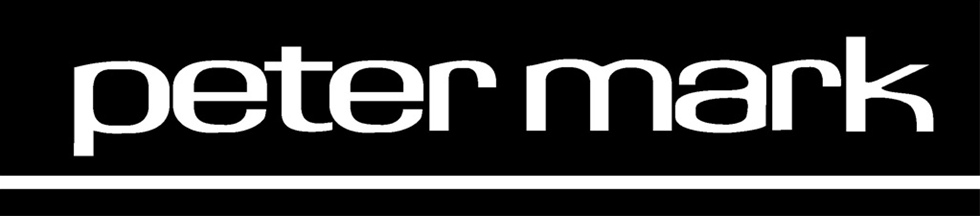
- Founded: June 28, 1961; 64 years ago in Dublin, Ireland
- Founders: Peter Keaveney; Mark Keaveney
- Headquarters: 15 Ely Place, Dublin, Ireland
- Number of locations: 69 (2024)
- Area served: Republic of Ireland Northern Ireland
- Key people: Peter O'Rourke (CEO), James R Keaveney, Patrick J Keaveney and Paul V Keaveney and Cathal Keaveney (Directors)
- Revenue: €58 million (2023)
- Number of employees: 1,410 (2023)

Peter Mark is an Irish hairdressing chain founded in June 1961 by brothers Peter and Mark Keaveney. The first shop they opened was on the first floor of 87 Grafton Street, Dublin. It opened a second salon at 72 Grafton Street in 1964, and a third at Stillorgan Shopping Centre in 1966. It opened its first unisex salon on North Earl Street, Dublin in 1970, and its first training school in 1971. By 1989, the business had 50 salons around the island of Ireland, which grew to 69 by 2025. The company operates is own hairdresser training schools, and recruits approximately 100 apprentices each year for its three-year training programme.

In 2019 their profits were reported to have increased. Following the 2020 Coronavirus pandemic, they increased prices and closed one branch. The business is still operated by members of the Keaveney family.
