= County Roscommon =

County in Ireland

Coordinates: 53°45′N 8°15′W

County Roscommon Contae Ros Comáin
- County
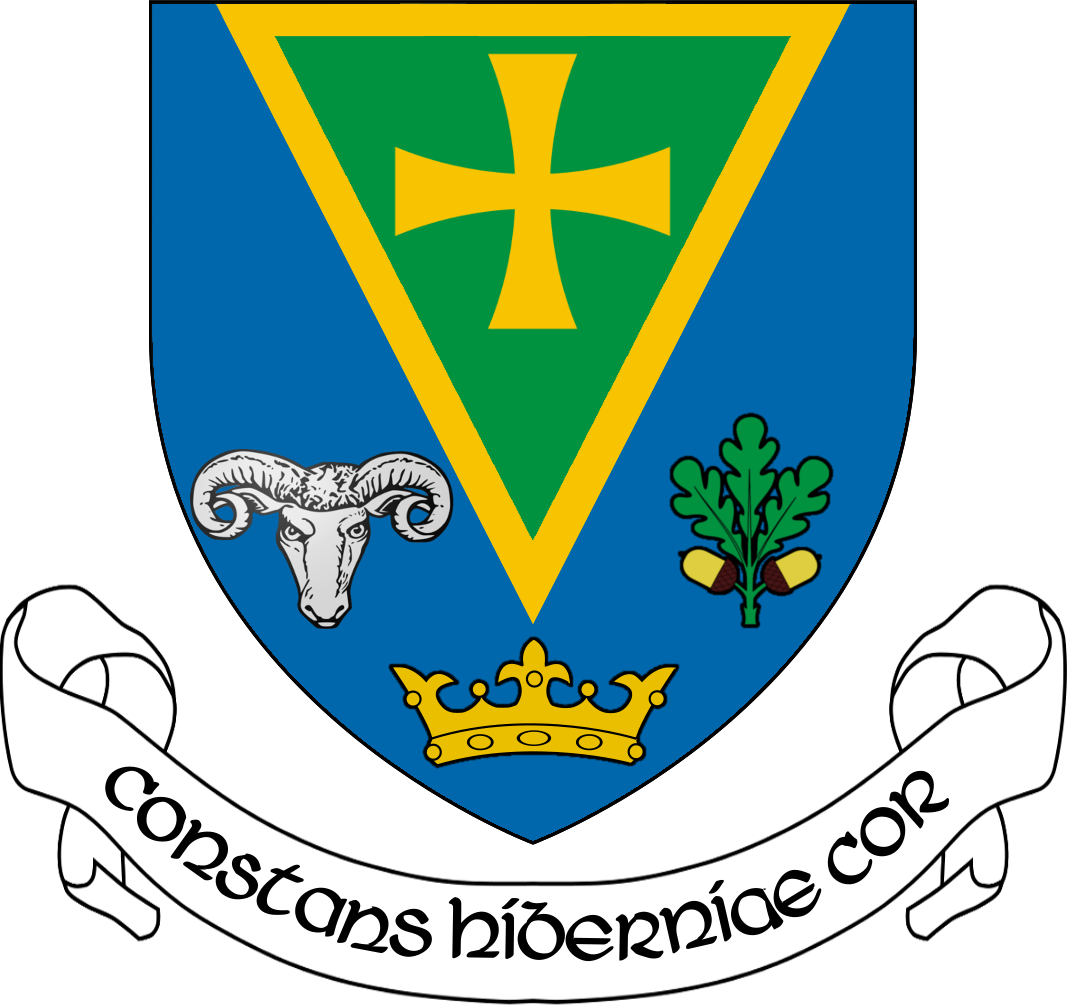
- Coat of arms
- Motto: Latin: Constans Hiberniae Cor "Steadfast Irish heart"
- Interactive map of County Roscommon
- Country: Ireland
- Province: Connacht
- Region: Northern and Western
- Established: c. 1569
- County town: Roscommon

Government
  - Local authority: Roscommon County Council
  - Dáil constituency: Roscommon–Galway
  - EP constituency: Midlands–North-West

Area
  - Total: 2,548 km^{2} (984 sq mi)
  - Rank: 11th
- Highest elevation (Seltannasaggart): 428 m (1,404 ft)

Population (2022)
  - Total: 70,259
  - Rank: 26th
  - Density: 27.57/km^{2} (71.42/sq mi)
- Time zone: UTC±0 (WET)
  - Summer (DST): UTC+1 (IST)
- Eircode routing keys: F42, F45, F52 (primarily)
- Telephone area codes: 071, 090 (primarily)
- ISO 3166 code: IE-RN
- Vehicle index mark code: RN
- Website: Official website

County Roscommon (Irish: Contae Ros Comáin) is a county in Ireland. It is part of the province of Connacht and the Northern and Western Region. It is the 11th largest Irish county by area and 26th most populous. Its county town and largest town is Roscommon. Roscommon County Council is the local authority for the county. The population of the county was 70,259 as of the 2022 census.

== Etymology ==
County Roscommon is named after the county town of Roscommon. Roscommon comes from the Irish Ros meaning a wooded, gentle height and Comán, the first abbot and bishop of Roscommon who founded the first monastery there in 550 AD.

== Geography ==
County Roscommon has an area of 2,548 square kilometres (984 sq mi). Lough Key in north Roscommon is noted for having thirty-two islands. The geographical centre of Ireland is located on the western shore of Lough Ree in the south of the county.

Roscommon is the third largest of Connacht's five counties by size and the second-smallest in terms of population. It ranks 11th in size of Ireland's 32 counties, but 26th in terms of population, making it the 3rd most sparsely populated county after Leitrim and Mayo. The county borders every other Connacht county: Galway, Mayo, Sligo, and Leitrim, as well as three Leinster counties: Longford, Westmeath, and Offaly. In 2008, a news report said that statistically, people from Roscommon have the longest life expectancy of any county on the island of Ireland.

Seltannasaggart, which is located along the northern border with County Leitrim, is the tallest point in County Roscommon, measuring to a height of 428 m (1,404.20 ft).

=== Largest towns by population ===
According to the 2022 census:

1. Roscommon 6,555
2. Athlone* 4,595 (Part of Athlone (Monksland) is in Co. Roscommon)
3. Boyle 2,915
4. Ballaghaderreen 2,387
5. Castlerea 2,348
6. Ballyleague* 1,733 (includes Lanesborough, County Longford)
7. Strokestown 850
8. Roosky* 787 (A small part of Roosky is in County Leitrim)

*Not all of the population resides within County Roscommon

== Baronies ==
There are nine historical baronies in County Roscommon.

North Roscommon

- Boyle (north Roscommon including Boyle and Arigna).
- Frenchpark (north-west, including Ballaghaderreen and Frenchpark).
- Roscommon (mid-north-east, including Strokestown and Tulsk).
- Castlereagh (west, including Castlerea and Ballinlough).
- Ballintober North (east including Rooskey and Tarmonbarry).

South Roscommon

- Ballymoe shared with County Galway includes Ballymoe, Creggs and Glenamaddy.
- Ballintober South (south-mid-east, including Roscommon).
- Athlone (mid-south, including Knockcroghery and part of Athlone).
- Moycarn (far-south, including part of Ballinasloe).

== History ==
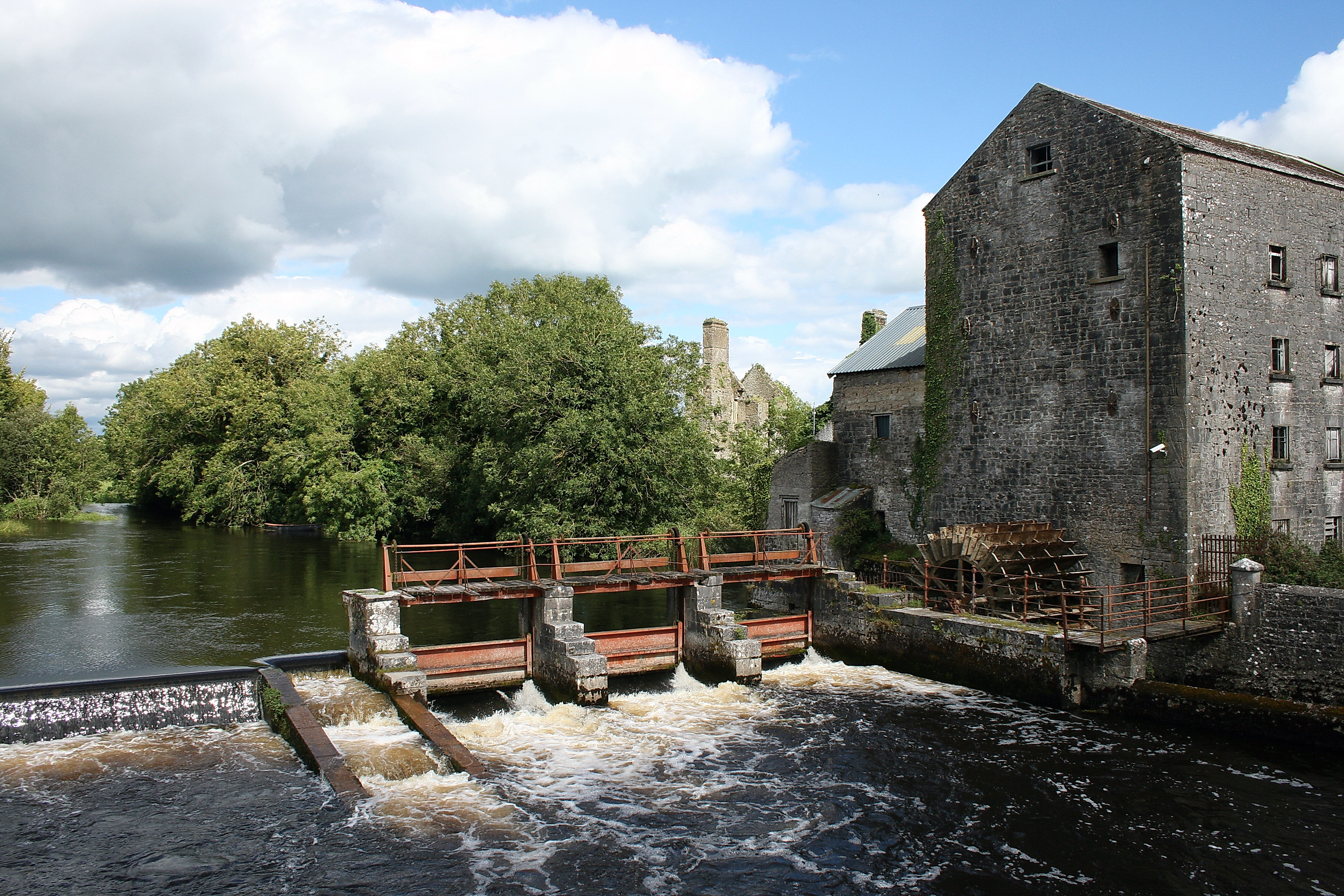
River Suck at Athleague.

Rathcroghan (Irish: Rath Cruachán), near Tulsk, a complex of archaeological sites, the home of Queen Medb (Irish: Méadhbh, anglicised Maeve), was the seat of Kings of Connacht and then to the High Kings of Ireland. This was the starting point of the Táin Bó Cúailnge, or Cattle Raid of Cooley, an epic tale in Irish mythology. The county is home to prehistoric ringforts such as Carnagh West Ringfort and Drummin fort.

Roscommon was first defined as a county (or shired) in 1292, just over 100 years after the Anglo Norman invasion of Ireland in 1169. County Roscommon as an administrative division has its roots in the Middle Ages. With the conquest and division of the Kingdom of Connacht, those districts in the east retained by King John as "The King's Cantreds" covered County Roscommon, and parts of East Galway. These districts were leased to the native kings of Connacht and eventually became the county. In 1585 during the Tudor re-establishment of counties under the Composition of Connacht, Roscommon was established with the South-west boundary now alongside the River Suck.

=== Medieval art ===
A "well defined" and "original" fine metal workshop was active in County Roscommon in the 12th century. The Cross of Cong, the Aghadoe crosier, Shrine of the Book of Dimma and Shrine of Manchan of Mohill' are grouped together as having been created by Mael Isu Bratain Ui Echach et al., at the same Roscommon workshop. The workshop has been linked to St. Assicus of Elphin.

=== Ordnance Survey ===
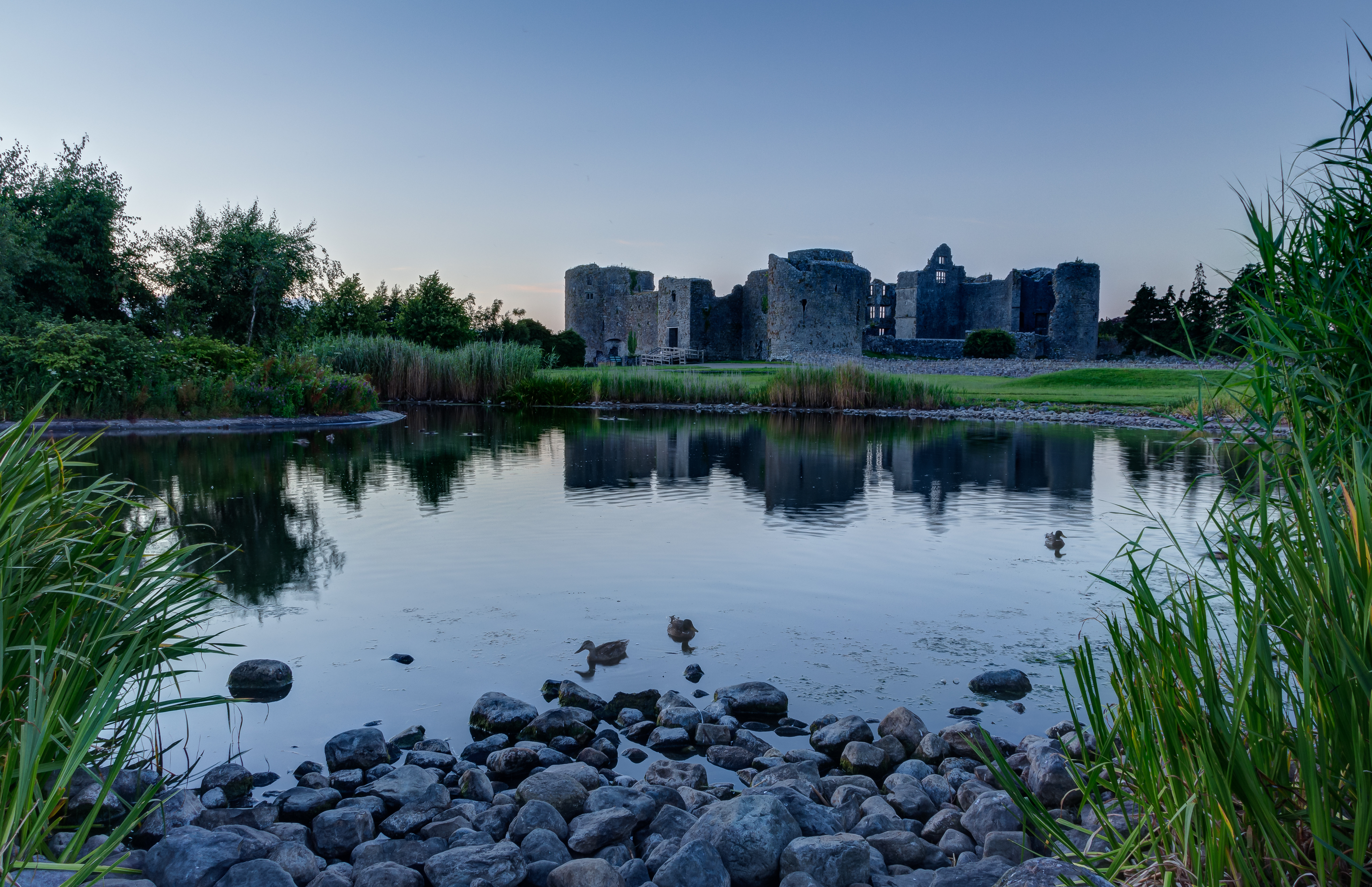
Roscommon Castle

John O'Donovan (1806–1861), historian and scholar, visited County Roscommon in 1837, while compiling information for the Ordnance Survey. Entering St Peter's parish in Athlone in June 1837, he wrote, "I have now entered upon a region totally different from Longford, and am very much pleased with the intelligence of the people." However, he had major problems with place-names. He later wrote, "I am sick to death's door of lochawns, and it pains me to the very soul to have to make these remarks, but what can I do when I cannot make the usual progress? Here I am stuck in the mud in the middle of Loughs, Turlaghs, Lahaghs and Curraghs, the names of many of which are only known to a few old men in their immediate neighbourhood and I cannot give many of them utterance from the manner in which they are spelled."

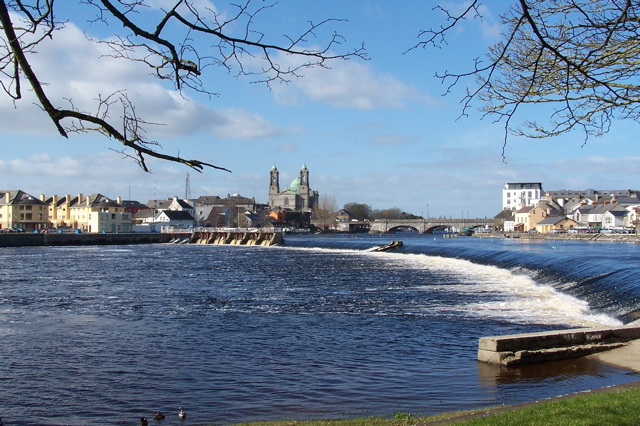
The River Shannon running through Athlone town.

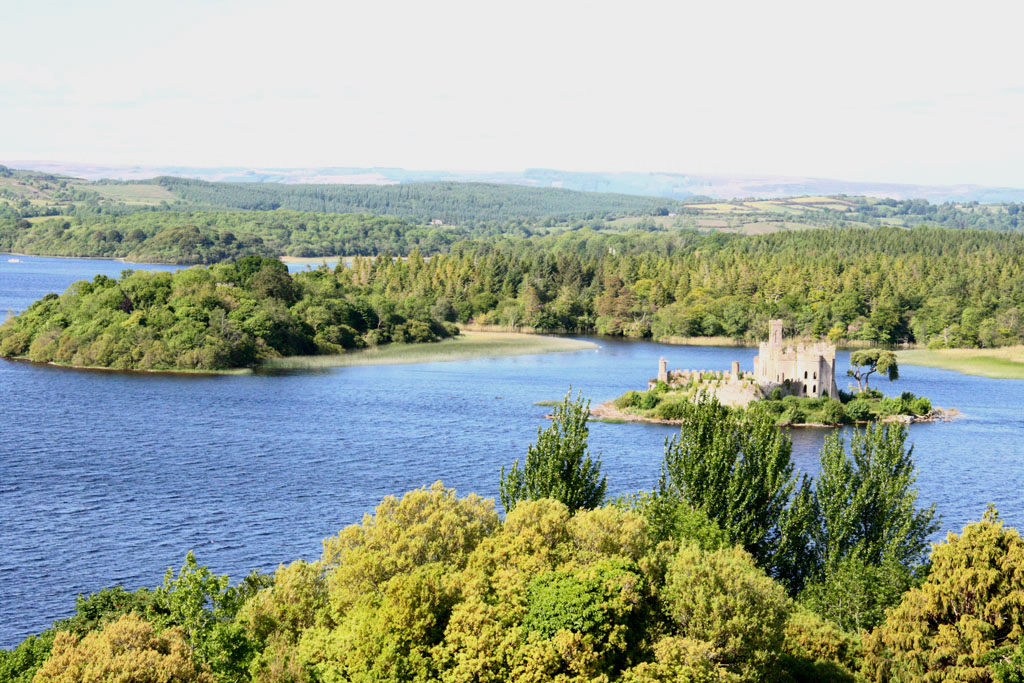
Lough Key

== Places of interest ==
A greenway is planned connecting Athlone to Ballyleague.

- Arigna Mining Experience
- Boyle Abbey
- Clonalis House
- Elphin Windmill
- Lough Key Forest Park
- McDermott's Castle
- Meehambee Dolmen
- National Famine Museum
- Rathcroghan
- Roscommon County Museum
- Strokestown Park

== Government and politics ==
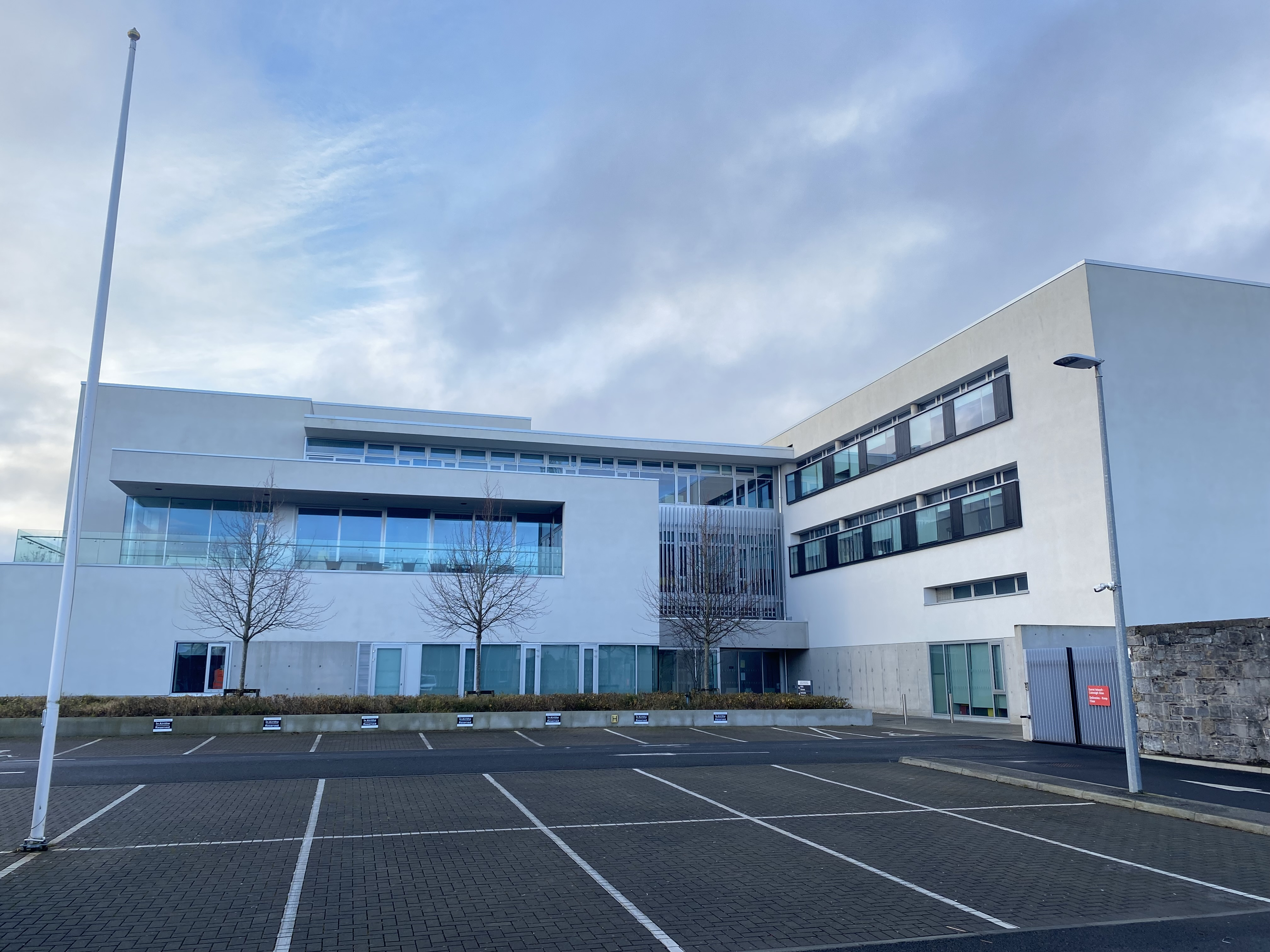
Roscommon County Hall in 2024

The island of Ireland, showing location of County Roscommon.

Roscommon is governed locally by the 18-member Roscommon County Council, a body created under the Local Government (Ireland) Act 1898.

The 1898 Act also divided the county into the rural districts of Athlone No. 2, Ballinasloe No. 2, Boyle No. 1, Carrick-on-Shannon No. 2, Castlerea, Roscommon, and Strokestown. The rural districts were abolished in 1925. Boyle and Roscommon were administered locally by town commissioners. Roscommon town commissioners were abolished in 1927. After becoming a town council in 2002, in common with all other town councils in Ireland, Boyle Town Council was abolished under the Local Government Reform Act 2014.

For general elections, Roscommon is completely within the three-seat Dáil constituency of Roscommon–Galway. For European elections, the county is part of the Midlands–North-West constituency.

== Rail transport ==
There are railway stations located in Boyle (Dublin–Sligo line), Carrick-on-Shannon (Dublin–Sligo line), Roscommon (Dublin–Westport line), Castlerea (Dublin-Westport line), Ballinasloe (Dublin-Galway line) and Athlone (Dublin–Galway and Dublin–Westport lines).

== Sport ==
Gaelic football is the dominant sport in Roscommon. Roscommon won the All-Ireland Senior Football Championships in 1943 and 1944 and the National Football League Division 1 in 1979, as well as Division 2 in 2015 and 2018. Roscommon have captured the Connacht Senior Football Championship on 25 occasions, the most recent being in 2026, beating Galway in Dr. Hyde Park. In March 2025 Roscommon won back promotion to Division 1.

Roscommon's main hurling title was the 2007 Nicky Rackard Cup.

Association football and rugby are also popular sports in the county.

== Notable events ==
The last known fatal duel to take place on the island of Ireland occurred at Ballygill Bridge over the River Suck on the Roscommon Galway border near Ballinasloe on May 28th 1841, and it was between two young local Roscommon men. The duel, using pistols, involved near neighbors Malachy Kelly of Tonalig and Owen Lynch of Rathpeak whose dispute arose from an incident at a recent horse race. Lynch prevailed in the duel, and Kelly succumbed to his injuries one week later. Lynch was brought to trial, but found not guilty.

== Notable people ==
- Feidlim Ua Conchobair (died 1265), King of Connacht
- Uilliam Buí Ó Ceallaigh (died 1381), Taoiseach of Uí Maine and Chief of the Name, who hosted the famous feast of 1351 that created the phrase "Fáilte Uí Cheallaigh" ("an O'Kelly Welcome"), lived in Galey Castle, near Knockcroghery
- Charles O'Conor (1710–1791), historian and antiquarian of the O'Conor Don family
- Matthew O'Conor Don (1773–1844) historian born in Ballinagare
- Arthur French, 1st Baron de Freyne (1786–1856), Member of Parliament and landlord of Frenchpark House
- Sir John Scott Lillie (1790–1868) CB, decorated Peninsular War veteran, inventor and political activist in England
- James Curley (1796–1889), Jesuit and astronomer, born in Athleague
- William Wilde (1815–1876), surgeon, innovator and father of Oscar Wilde, born in Castlerea
- Michael Dockry (born 1817), member of the Wisconsin State Assembly
- Thomas Curley (1825–1904), American Civil War colonel, farmer and Wisconsin legislator, born in Tremane, near Athleague
- John Gately Downey (24 June 1827 – 1 March 1894), seventh governor of California from 14 January 1860 to 10 January 1862
- Henry Gore-Browne (1830–1912), Victoria Cross recipient, born in Newtown
- Bernard J. D. Irwin (1830–1917), 1st Recipient of The Medal Of Honor
- Luke O'Connor (1831–1915), first soldier to receive the Victoria Cross, born in Hillstreet, near Elphin
- John Fitzgibbon (1845–1919), Member of Parliament
- William Griffiths (1841–1879), recipient of the Victoria Cross, born in County Roscommon
- Percy French (1854–1920), born in Tulsk, was a foremost songwriter and entertainer, and water-colour painter
- Sir Owen Lloyd (1854–1941), recipient of the Victoria Cross, born in County Roscommon
- Thomas Heazle Parke (1857–1893), explorer and naturalist, born at Clogher House, Kilmore
- Charlotte O'Conor Eccles (1860–1911) writer, journalist and translator born in the county
- Roderic O'Conor (1860–1940), impressionist artist of the O'Conor Don Family
- Douglas Hyde (1860–1949), scholar of the Irish language, first President of Ireland (1938–45), founder of the Gaelic League during the Revival of the late 19th – early 20th century, born in Castlerea and buried in the Hyde Museum, Frenchpark
- Aleen Cust (1868–1937), the first female veterinary surgeon in Ireland or Great Britain, practised in County Roscommon and is buried in Roscommon town
- Margaret Cousins (née Gillespie, 1878–1954), educationist and suffragist in India, born in Boyle
- Edward Flanagan (1886–1948), priest and founder of the orphanage Boys Town
- Maureen O'Sullivan (1911–1998), Ireland's first international movie star, born in Boyle
- Máire McDonnell-Garvey (1927–2009), Traditional Irish musician born in Tobracken near Ballaghaderreen
- Brian O'Doherty (1928–2022), artist and art critic in New York City, born in Ballaghaderreen
- Albert Reynolds (1932–2014), Taoiseach, born in Rooskey
- Nuala Quinn-Barton (born 1952), US film producer, artist and model brought up at Killerr, Ballintober
- Brian Leyden (born 1960), novelist, short story writer, screenwriter and documentarian of Arigna
- Luke 'Ming' Flanagan (born 1972), politician and MEP born in Roscommon
- Chris O'Dowd (born 1979), actor and comedian, born in Boyle
- Seamus O'Neill (born 1982 or 1983), Gaelic footballer

== See also ==
- Counties of Ireland
- Earl of Roscommon
- High Sheriff of Roscommon
- List of abbeys and priories in Ireland (County Roscommon)
- Lord Lieutenant of Roscommon
