= Stephen Burke =

Irish film director

- Born: Dublin
- Occupation: Film director

Stephen Burke is an Irish film director. Born in Dublin, he made two half hour long films about aspects of The Troubles. His second feature film, Maze, 2017, tells the story of the 1983 Maze Prison escape by 38 IRA prisoners.
