= Chronological list of Irish classical composers =

The following is a chronological list of classical music composers living and working in Ireland, or originating from Ireland.

== Renaissance ==
- Cormac MacDermott (died 1618)
- Ruaidri Dáll Ó Catháin (c. 1580 – c. 1653)
- Nicholas Dáll Pierce (c.1561–1653)

== Baroque ==
- Johann Sigismund Kusser (1660–1727)
- Thomas Roseingrave (c.1690–1766)
- Henry Madin (1698–1748) born in France to Irish parents

== Galant period ==
- Kane O'Hara (c.1711–1782)
- Francis Ireland (1721–1784)
- Tommaso Giordani (c.1733–1806)
- Garret Wesley, 1st Earl of Mornington (1735–1781)
- Richard Woodward (c.1743–1777)

== Classical ==
- Charles Thomas Carter (c.1735–1804)
- Charles Clagget (1740–c.1795)
- Philip Cogan (1750–1833)
- John Andrew Stevenson (1761–1833)
- Michael Kelly (1762–1826)
- Peter K. Moran (1767–1831)
- Thomas Carter (1769–1800)
- Thomas Augustine Geary (1775–1801)
- Johann Bernhard Logier (1777–1846)
- Thomas Simpson Cooke (1782–1848)

== Romantic ==
- John Field (1782–1837)
- William Henry Kearns (1794–1846)
- William Michael Rooke (1794–1847)
- Joseph Augustine Wade (1796–1845)
- Samuel Lover (1797–1868)
- George Alexander Osborne (1806–1893)
- Michael William Balfe (1808–1870)
- Richard Michael Levey (1811–1899)
- W. Vincent Wallace (1812–1865)
- John William Glover (1815–1899)
- Joseph Robinson (1815–1898)
- Wellington Guernsey (1817–1885)
- Robert Prescott Stewart (1825–1894)
- Joseph O'Kelly (1828–1885)
- Patrick Gilmore (1829–1892)

== Late Romantic ==
- Arthur O'Leary (1834–1919)
- George William Torrance (1835–1907)
- James Lynam Molloy (1837–1909)
- Charles Villiers Stanford (1852–1924)
- T. R. G. Jozé (1853–1924)
- Michele Esposito (1855–1929)
- Arthur Hervey (1855–1922)
- Paul McSwiney (1856–1889)
- Hope Temple (1859–1938)
- Thomas O'Brien Butler (1861–1915)
- Alicia Adelaide Needham (1863–1945)
- Charles Wood (1866–1926)
- Hamilton Harty (1879–1941)

== Early twentieth century ==
- Robert O'Dwyer (1862–1949)
- Swan Hennessy (1866–1929)
- Carl Hardebeck (1869–1945)
- Mary Dickenson-Auner (1880–1965)
- Herbert Hughes (1882–1937)
- Geoffrey Molyneux Palmer (1882–1957)
- John F. Larchet (1884–1967)
- Ina Boyle (1889–1967)
- Ernest John Moeran (1894–1950)
- Arthur Duff (1899–1956)
- Rhoda Coghill (1903–2000)
- Éamonn Ó Gallchobhair (1906–1982)
- Joan Trimble (1915–2000)

== Mid- to late twentieth century ==
- Howard Ferguson (1908–1999)
- Michael Bowles (1909–1998)
- Aloys Fleischmann (1910–1992)
- Frederick May (1911–1985)
- Walter Beckett (1914–1996)
- Brian Boydell (1917–2000)
- T.C. Kelly (1917–1985)
- Havelock Nelson (1917–1996)
- A. J. Potter (1918–1980)
- Gerard Victory (1921–1995)
- James Wilson (1922–2005)
- Hormoz Farhat (1929–2021)
- Seán Ó Riada (1931–1971)
- John Kinsella (1932–2021)
- Seóirse Bodley (1933–2023)

== Contemporary ==
- Frank Corcoran (born 1944)
- Jerome de Bromhead (born 1945)
- Jane O'Leary (born 1946)
- Philip Martin (born 1947)
- Shaun Davey (born 1948)
- Roger Doyle (born 1949)
- Kevin Volans (born 1949)
- Bill Whelan (born 1950)
- John Buckley (born 1951)
- Philip Hammond (born 1951)
- Gerald Barry (born 1952)
- Raymond Deane (born 1953)
- Eibhlís Farrell (born 1953)
- John Wolf Brennan (born 1954)
- Patrick Cassidy (born 1956)
- Rhona Clarke (born 1958)
- Ronan Guilfoyle (born 1958)
- Fergus Johnston (born 1959)
- Michael Alcorn (born 1962)
- Vincent Kennedy (born 1962)
- Michael McGlynn (born 1964)
- John McLachlan (born 1964)
- Ian Wilson (born 1964)
- Benjamin Dwyer (born 1965)
- Gráinne Mulvey (born 1966)
- Deirdre Gribbin (born 1967)
- Siobhán Cleary (born 1970)
- Donnacha Dennehy (born 1970)
- Jennifer Walshe (born 1974)
- Ed Bennett (born 1975)
- David Flynn (born 1977)
- Eoin O'Keeffe (born 1979)
- Ailbhe McDonagh (born 1982)
- Seán Clancy (born 1984)
- Seán Doherty (born 1987)
