= List of Irish classical composers =

This is a list of composers from Ireland working in the classical (art music) tradition. It does not contain composers for pop, rock, trad, jazz, or film music. For Irish film music composers search for the 'Category:Irish film score composers' in the search box above.

== A – D ==
- Michael Alcorn (born 1962), contemporary composer
- Michael William Balfe (1808–1870), romantic opera composer best known for The Bohemian Girl
- Gerald Barry (born 1952), contemporary composer
- Walter Beckett (1914–1996), 20th-century composer
- Ed Bennett (born 1975), contemporary composer.
- Seóirse Bodley (1933–2023), contemporary composer
- Michael Bowles (1909–1998), 20th-century composer
- Brian Boydell (1917–2000), 20th-century composer
- Ina Boyle (1889–1967), female 20th-century composer
- John Buckley (born 1951), contemporary composer
- John Wolf Brennan (born 1954), Switzerland-based contemporary composer
- Thomas O'Brien Butler (1861–1915), Celticist composer
- Charles Thomas Carter (c. 1735 – 1804), 18th-century composer
- Thomas Carter (1769–1800), 18th-century composer
- Patrick Cassidy (composer) (born 1956), contemporary composer
- Charles Clagget (1740–c.1795), 18th-century composer
- Seán Clancy (born 1984), contemporary composer
- Rhona Clarke (born 1958), contemporary composer
- Ann Cleare (born 1983), contemporary composer
- Siobhán Cleary (born 1970), contemporary composer
- Philip Cogan (1750–1833), classical period composer
- Rhoda Coghill (1903–2000), 20th-century composer
- Houston Collisson (1865–1920), opera and ballad composer
- Thomas Simpson Cooke (1782–1848), early 19th-century composer
- Frank Corcoran (born 1944), contemporary composer resident in Germany
- Shaun Davey (born 1948), 20th-century romantic composer
- Jerome de Bromhead (born 1945), contemporary composer
- Raymond Deane (born 1953), contemporary composer
- Donnacha Dennehy (born 1970), contemporary composer and founder of the Crash Ensemble
- Seán Doherty (born 1987), contemporary composer
- Roger Doyle (born 1949), contemporary composer known for electro-acoustic music
- Arthur Duff (1899–1956), 20th-century composer
- Benjamin Dwyer (born 1965), contemporary composer

== E – K ==
- Michele Esposito (1855–1929), Italo-Irish composer
- Hormoz Farhat (born 1929), 20th-century composer
- Eibhlís Farrell (born 1953), 20th-century composer
- Howard Ferguson (1908–1999), Northern Irish composer based in England
- John Field (1782–1837), romantic composer and pianist, notable for cultivating the nocturne
- Aloys Fleischmann (1910–1992), 20th-century composer
- W. H. Grattan Flood (1857–1928), composer and music historian
- David Flynn (born 1977), contemporary composer
- Charlotte Milligan Fox (1864–1916), composer, arranger and folksong collector
- Thomas Augustine Geary (1775–1801), 18th-century composer
- Patrick Gilmore (1829–1892), Irish-American composer and bandmaster
- John William Glover (1815–1899), 19th-century composer
- Deirdre Gribbin (born 1967), contemporary composer
- Wellington Guernsey (1817–1885), ballad and piano composer
- Ronan Guilfoyle (born 1958), contemporary composer and jazz bassist
- Carl Hardebeck (1869–1945), early 20th-century composer and arranger
- Hamilton Harty (1879–1941), late romantic composer and a leading conductor of his time
- Swan Hennessy (1866–1929), Irish-American, Paris-based composer
- Victor Herbert (1859–1924), Irish-American composer of musicals
- Arthur Hervey (1855–1922), late 19th-century composer and music critic
- Michael Holohan (born 1956), contemporary composer and writer
- Ciaran Hope (born 1974), contemporary composer
- Herbert Hughes (1882–1937), composer and skilful arranger of traditional music
- Francis Ireland (1721–1784), late baroque composer
- Fergus Johnston (born 1959), contemporary composer
- T. R. G. Jozé (1853–1924), organist and composer
- William Henry Kearns (1794–1846), 19th-century composer
- Vincent Kennedy (born 1962), contemporary Irish composer
- Michael Kelly (1762–1826), tenor and opera composer
- T.C. Kelly (1917–1985), neo-romantic 20th-century composer
- John Kinsella (1932–2021), contemporary composer

== L – O ==
- John F. Larchet (1884–1967), late romantic composer and influential teacher
- Nicola LeFanu (born 1947), contemporary composer, born of Irish parents in England
- Richard Michael Levey (1811–1899), 19th-century composer, violinist and conductor
- Samuel Lover (1799–1868), composer of operettas and songs
- Elizabeth Maconchy (1907–1994), 20th-century composer, born in England, Irish parents, raised in Howth.
- Philip Martin (born 1947), contemporary composer and pianist
- Frederick May (1911–1985), 20th-century composer
- Ailbhe McDonagh (born 1982), contemporary composer and cellist
- Michael McGlynn (born 1964), contemporary composer, founder of choral group Anúna
- John McLachlan (born 1964), contemporary composer
- Paul McSwiney (1856–1889), 19th-century composer
- Ernest John Moeran (1894–1950), early 20th-century English composer with Irish connections
- James Lynam Molloy (1837–1909), composer of popular ballads
- Peter K. Moran (1767–1831), early 19th-century composer
- Peter Moran (born 1981), composer and gamelan director
- Garret Wesley, 1st Earl of Mornington (1735–1781), late baroque / early classical composer
- Gráinne Mulvey (born 1966), contemporary composer
- Alicia Adelaide Needham (1863–1945), composer of popular ballads
- Havelock Nelson (1917–1996), 20th-century light music composer
- Ailís Ní Ríain (born 1974), contemporary composer
- Turlough O'Carolan, (1670-1738), harper and composer
- Robert O'Dwyer (1862–1949), early 20th-century composer
- Kane O'Hara (c.1711–1782), composer of burlettas (early comic operas)
- Eoin O'Keeffe (born 1979), contemporary composer
- Joseph O'Kelly (1828–1885), Franco-Irish romantic composer
- Arthur O'Leary (1834–1919), 19th-century composer
- Jane O'Leary (born 1946), contemporary American-Irish composer
- Seán Ó Riada (1931–1971), 20th-century composer and arranger of traditional Irish music
- Gearóid Ó Deaghaidh (born 1954), Dún Dealgan 21st-century composer and arranger of contemporary Irish music and traditional Irish music
- George Alexander Osborne (1806–1893), 19th-century piano composer

== P – Z ==
- Geoffrey Molyneux Palmer (1882–1957), 20th-century composer
- Annie Patterson (1868–1934), early 20th-century composer and musicologist
- A. J. Potter (1918–1980), 20th-century composer
- Joseph Robinson (1815–1898), 19th-century composer, conductor, and teacher
- William Michael Rooke (1794–1847), 19th-century opera composer
- Thomas Roseingrave (c.1690–1766), baroque composer
- Charles Villiers Stanford (1852–1924), prominent late romantic composer
- John Andrew Stevenson (1761–1833), composer of operas and of the original accompaniments to Moore's Melodies
- Robert Prescott Stewart (1825–1894), 19th-century composer, organist and conductor
- Hope Temple (1859–1938), composer of popular ballads
- George William Torrance (1835–1907), 19th-century composer
- Joan Trimble (1915–2000), 20th-century composer
- Gerard Victory (1921–1995), 20th-century composer
- Kevin Volans (born 1949), contemporary composer born in South Africa, now an Irish citizen
- Joseph Augustine Wade (1796–1845), 19th-century composer
- W. Vincent Wallace (1812–1865), 19th-century composer of operas and piano music
- Jennifer Walshe (born 1974), contemporary composer and vocal artist
- Bill Whelan (born 1950), contemporary composer
- Ian Wilson (born 1964), contemporary composer
- James Wilson (1922–2005), prolific Irish-based composer
- Charles Wood (1866–1926), late romantic composer, known for his church music
- Richard Woodward (c.1743–1777), baroque composer
