= T. R. G. Jozé =

Irish organist and composer

Thomas Richard Gonsalvez Jozé, known as T. R. G. Jozé (26 September 1853 – 20 March 1924), was an Irish organist, teacher, choral conductor and composer who was mainly associated with the Royal Irish Academy of Music where he taught for about 45 years.

== Life ==
T. R. G. Jozé was born in Dublin into a music loving family of Spanish origin. His father John Charles was a chemist and amateur musician who in 1861 sent his son to Christ Church school to become a chorister. He was appointed deputy organist there in 1869, followed by appointments at St Paul's Church, Glenageary; Christ Church, Leeson Park; and Booterstown Church. He was also the organist at the Freemasons' Grand Lodge of Ireland on Dawson Street, Dublin.

Besides his activities as an organist, Jozé is mainly remembered today for his long association in a number of functions with the Royal Irish Academy of Music (RIAM) in Dublin. There, he taught the piano (1872–1882), organ (1880–1917), and harmony (1876–1918), conducted the choir (1883–1885) and the orchestra (1891–1915) while also sharing chamber music classes (1892–1899) with Charles Marchant. His pupils included Annie W. Patterson.

Other choral societies he conducted in Dublin and its suburbs included the Corinthian Club, the Kingstown Philharmonic Society, the Leeson Park Choral Society, the Sackville Hall Choral Society, the Sandymount Choral Union, and the Strollers' Club.

== Music ==
As a composer, Jozé wrote in numerous forms ranging from large-scale cantatas and stage works to choral, chamber and organ music, mostly with a focus on vocal music. In 1873, he received a first prize from the Hibernian Catch Club for his glee Soldier, rest!. Another prize-winning work was the "festival hymn" St Patrick's Breastplate. In 1877, Jozé received a doctorate of music (MusD) from Trinity College Dublin for his cantata The Prophecy of Capys. Although he "did not enjoy huge success as a composer", his large works did have performances, and much of his piano and choral music was published.

Much of Jozé's music fulfilled a contemporary demand for arrangements of Irish traditional melodies for small vocal ensembles, mainly partsongs for four voices. Some of these were set to words by Thomas Moore, Alfred Perceval Graves and George Sigerson. Publishers included Pigott in Dublin and Boosey in London. Pine (1998) described this approach to Irish traditional music as "cursory or ill-informed".

== Selected works ==
=== Stage works ===
- The Prophecy of Capys (1877), cantata for tenor, choir and orchestra
- Les Amourettes (1885), opera
- Eileen, or The Ocean Waif (n. d.), operetta

=== Orchestral ===
- Gavotte and Musette (n. d.)
- Grand March (n. d.)

=== Chamber ===
- Nocturne in G minor (1892), for violin and piano
- Five Irish Melodies (1899), for violin/cello and piano (written with R. P. Stewart)

=== Choral ===
==== Sacred ====
- O God, Who Hast Prepared for Them That Love Thee, anthem (published Dublin, 1920)
- Praise the Lord, O My Soul, anthem (n. d.)
- The Lord Is My Shepherd, anthem for female voices (n. d.)
- Te Deum & Benedictus (n. d.)
- Hymn to St Cecilia, for female voices, harp, violins and organ (n. d.)

==== Secular ====
- Arranmore Boat Song (Alfred Perceval Graves), 4-part song (London, 1901)
- Battlesong 'The Defence of Dublin' (George Sigerson), 4-part song (London, 1901)
- Far Away (A Londonderry Air) (G. Sigerson), 4-part song (London, 1901)
- The Irish Reel (A. P. Graves), 4-part song (London, 1901)
- The Harvest Rose, Irish Air (Patrick Joseph McCall), partsong (London, 1902)
- A Lament, Irish Melody (Thomas Moore), partsong (London, 1902)
- O'Sullivan Mór, Irish Air (G. Sigerson), partsong (London, 1902)
- When Thro' Life Unblest We Rove, Irish Melody (T. Moore) partsong (London, 1902)
- After the Battle / Thy Fair Bosom (T. Moore), partsong (London, 1903)
- The Capture of Cremona / The Monks of the Screw (G. Sigerson), partsong (London, 1903)
- Fly Not Yet / Planxty Kelly (T. Moore), partsong (London, 1903)
- 'Twas One of Those Dreams / The Song of the Woods (T. Moore), partsong (London, 1903)
- War Song of Macliag, partsong (London, c1904)
- Irish Partsongs and Choruses, arr. (London, 1899–1913)

=== Songs ===
- The Frost and the Footprints (R. M. Craig) (London, [1876])
- In Memoriam (Sir Robert Stewart) (G. Savage Armstrong) (c.1894)
- A Sunbeam Messenger (H. Crewe) (London, 1897)
- The Fisherman's Widow (n. d.), with violin obbligato
- Sleep, My Love, Sleep (n. d.), with cello obbligato

=== Church hymnals ===
- Chants and Responses (Dublin, 1907), with George William Torrance
- The Irish Chant Book (Dublin, 1925), with G. W. Torrance
