= Frederick May (composer) =

Irish composer (1911–1985)

Frederick May (9 June 1911 – 8 September 1985) was an Irish composer and arranger. His musical career was seriously hindered by a lifelong hearing problem and he produced relatively few compositions.

== Early years ==
Frederick May was born into a Dublin Protestant family who lived in the suburb of Donnybrook. His father, also named Frederick, was employed at the Guinness Brewery. May pursued his musical studies at the Royal Irish Academy of Music, where he was taught composition by John Larchet. In 1930, McCullough Pigott and Co. published his Irish Love Song. The same year he was awarded the Esposito Cup at the Feis Ceoil and as a result of this, he was nominated as the first recipient of a new scholarship prize worth £100 to be spent on the further study of piano. In July he took his preliminary examination for the BMus at Trinity College Dublin before departing Dublin to utilise his scholarship in London. In September he enrolled at the Royal College of Music where his teachers included Charles Kitson, Ralph Vaughan Williams, R. O. Morris and Gordon Jacob. He took his final TCD examination in December 1931 submitting a string quartet and on 10 December his degree was conferred. During 1932 May's study was funded by the RCM's Foli Scholarship and in October May was awarded the Octavia Travelling Scholarship.

On 17 March 1933, there was a first orchestral run-through of May's Scherzo for orchestra, and it received its first public performance on 1 December when it was heard as part of the Patron's Concert. Between the months of May and October May composed his Four Romantic Songs, which received their premiere in London at a Macnaghten-Lemare concert on 22 January 1934. At some point, probably in the second half of 1933, May followed in the footsteps of other Octavia Scholarship winners and travelled to Vienna to study with Egon Wellesz.

== Life and career ==
On 1 January 1936, he took up the position of Director of Music at the Abbey Theatre Dublin, a position he retained until he was fired in 1948. His duties mainly consisted of leading the piano trio which bore the title "The Abbey Orchestra" in music during the intervals of productions. In 1936 he composed what is today his best-known composition, the String Quartet in C Minor, but it was not premiered until 1948 when it was performed by the Martin Quartet in the Wigmore Hall, London. This was followed by the Symphonic Ballad (1937), the Suite of Irish Airs (1937), Spring Nocturne (1938), Songs from Prison (1941) and the Lyric Movement for Strings (1942). May effectively ceased original composition at this point, the major exception being his late orchestral work Sunlight and Shadow, which was premiered in January 1956. Later work was confined to arrangements and the revision of earlier compositions.

Throughout his life, May suffered from significant mental health issues which resulted in hospitalisation. He also experienced otosclerosis, as a result of which May gradually became increasingly deaf. In addition, he suffered from severe tinnitus with constant ringing noises in his head. In later life, he became homeless for a time due to alcoholism and slept at night in Grangegorman Asylum, Dublin. He was rescued by some friends led by Garech Browne whose record company Claddagh recorded the String Quartet in 1974.

Throughout his career, May was an advocate of better musical education in Ireland and expressed his views on this and other musical matters through the medium of The Bell, a monthly journal dealing with the arts. He was a co-founder, along with Brian Boydell and Aloys Fleischmann, of the Music Association of Ireland (now "Friends of Classical Music"), set up in 1948 to promote art music as an integral part of the cultural life of Ireland. Later he became a member of Aosdána. He lived for the last years of his life at Clontarf orthopaedic hospital, Dublin. He died at the age of 74 and is buried in Mount Jerome Cemetery.

== Music ==
May's compositions are few in number and he produced most of his small output in the 1930s and early 1940s. May's first significant work was the Scherzo for Orchestra, written while he was still a student in London. In 1936 he composed his String Quartet in C Minor, described in the Grove Dictionary of Music and Musicians as "one of the most individual statements from an Irish composer in the first half of the 20th century". May composed the quartet as his hearing was beginning to deteriorate and he later described it as "an appeal for release". The first performance of his Songs From Prison, a setting for baritone and orchestra of poems by Ernst Toller and Erich Stadlen, was broadcast on BBC Radio in December 1942. For fellow composer Arthur Duff, the work demonstrated that May was "more a follower of Mahler and Berg than a successor to (Charles Villiers) Stanford and (Hamilton) Harty".

Following a long break from composition, May produced what was to be his valedictory work in 1955. This was the nine-minute orchestral piece Sunlight and Shadows, given its first performance on 22 January 1956 by the Radio Éireann Symphony Orchestra at Dublin's Gaiety Theatre. Although this was his last original work, May did not abandon music completely. He produced arrangements of Irish music for Radio Éireann, which while not perhaps rewarding artistically did help to alleviate his always precarious financial situation. May also composed a number of songs for voice and piano and a short piece entitled Idyll for violin and piano. The latter was chosen as a set work for the junior violin competition at the Feis Ceoil in 2017.

== Recordings ==
- Suite of Irish Airs, Radio Éireann Symphony Orchestra, Milan Horvat (cond.), on: Decca (USA) DL 9843, LP (1958).
- String Quartet in C Minor, Aeolian Quartet, on: Claddagh Records CSM2, LP (1974); re-issued on CD in 2020 (CSM2CD).
- String Quartet in C Minor, Vanbrugh Quartet, on: Marco Polo 8.223888, CD (1996).
- Sunlight and Shadow, Scherzo, Spring Nocturne, Suite of Irish Airs, Songs from Prison, RTÉ National Symphony Orchestra, Owen Gilhooley (baritone), Robert Houlihan (cond.), on: RTÉ lyric fm CD 135, CD (2011).
- Irish Love Song, Hesperus, Spring, Drought, The Little Black Boy, I Sing of a Maiden, Herdsman, April, Evening on Road, Dun Laoghaire, By the Bivouac's Fitful Flame, The Traveller, The Finch, Brimscombe, Communion, North Labrador, Garden Abstract, Dialogue, Four Romantic Songs; Owen Gilhooley (tenor), Catherina Lemoni O'Doherty (piano), Vanbrugh Quartet; on: DIT CMD 004 (CD accompanying the book edited by Mark Fitzgerald, see 'Bibliography', 2016).

== Bibliography ==
- T.O.S. [Tomás Ó Súilleabháin?]: "Spring Nocturne: A Profile of Frederick May", in: Counterpoint 2 (1970) November, pp. 14–18.
- Kent Kay: "Frederick May", in: The Irish Times, 12 December 1974.
- Fanny Feehan: " The Fiery Soul", in: Hibernia, 10 January 1975.
- Axel Klein: Die Musik Irlands im 20. Jahrhundert (Hildesheim: Georg Olms Verlag, 1996).
- Philip Graydon: Modernism in Ireland and its Cultural Context in the Music and Writings of Frederick May, Brian Boydell and Aloys Fleischmann (unpublished MA thesis, Maynooth University, 1999).
- Mark Fitzgerald: "Inventing Identities: The Case of Frederick May", in: Mark Fitzgerald & John O'Flynn (eds.): Music and Identity in Ireland and Beyond (Farnham, Surrey: Ashgate, 2014), pp. 83–101.
- Mark Fitzgerald (ed.): The Songs of Frederick May (Dublin: Dublin Institute of Technology, 2016) – with CD.
- Mark Fitzgerald: 'Retrieving the real Frederick May' (Journal of the Society of Musicology Ireland, 2019)
- Mark Fitzgerald: 'Mogu and the Unicorn: Frederick May's music for the Gate Theatre' (in A Stage of Emancipation: Change and Progress at the Dublin Gate Theatre, edited by Marguérite Corporaal and Ruud van den Beuken, 151–66. Liverpool University Press, 2021)
