= Richard Michael Levey =

Irish violinist, conductor and composer

R. M. Levey
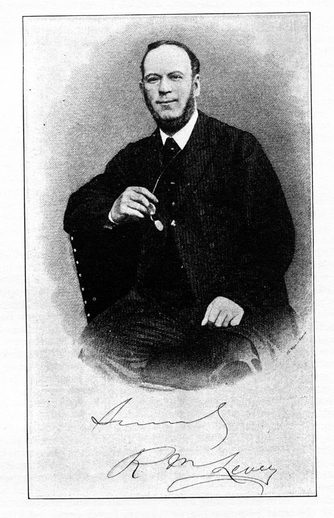
- Born: 25 October 1811; County Meath, Ireland
- Died: 28 June 1899 (aged 87); Dalkey, County Dublin
- Resting place: Glasnevin Cemetery
- Occupations: Violinist; conductor; composer

Richard Michael Levey (25 October 1811 – 28 June 1899), mostly known as R. M. Levey, was an Irish violinist, conductor, composer, and teacher. He was one of a handful of noted musicians who kept Dublin's concert life in the nineteenth century alive under difficult economic circumstances.

== Life ==
Levey was born in County Meath, the place name is not established. Levey's original surname was O'Shaughnessy, but according to one of his most prominent pupils, the composer Charles Villiers Stanford, he changed it "for what he considered to be a more musical one". Levey was his mother's maiden name. The name was officially adopted, and all of his children and the following generations were called Levey (according to several sources, Levey had 20 children from three wives).

He received tuition on the violin in Dublin by James Barton (c.1785–c.1850) and became a member of the orchestra of the Theatre Royal, Dublin in 1826, aged 15, succeeding Barton as concert master there in 1834. From 1834 until the destruction of the edifice by fire in 1880 he was also the musical director of the Theatre Royal, a role that involved conducting the orchestra, composing more than 100 overtures to plays, and directing operatic performances including vocal soloists, a chorus and the orchestra. He was also leader of the orchestras of the Antient Concerts Society and the Philharmonic Society as well as secretary of the Dublin Madrigal Society and the Irish Musical Fund. According to Beausang (2013), "he was omnipresent for over 50 years at public concerts in Dublin by local and visiting musicians". On the occasion of the 50th anniversary of his association with the Theatre Royal, he was presented on stage with a "testimonial" from the Duke of Leinster and the Earl of Charlemont and a benefit performance.

Still a young man, Levey played in the orchestra during Angelica Catalani's tour of Ireland in 1829 and the visit to Dublin of Michael William Balfe's opera company in 1839. Levey also conducted the Irish premiere of Balfe's The Maid of Artois In 1840. Balfe, who had also studied with James Barton, remained a life-long friend of Levey's.

In addition, Levey was a prominent violin teacher in Dublin. In 1848, he was a co-founder of the Royal Irish Academy of Music and was its professor of violin from its foundation until 1897. In 1852, he formed a class for advanced students there modelled on the methods of the Conservatoire in Paris and the Academy of Music in Leipzig. His most prominent pupils were Robert Prescott Stewart and Charles V. Stanford.

Levey was also a keen expert on Irish traditional music. He presented public lectures, played the violin in lectures by others, and published a collection of more than 100 dance tunes in 1858. Following reprints in 1965 and 2003, this is still in use today.

Among Levey's children was the birth of triplets in April 1837, two of whom became prominent musicians: the violin virtuoso Richard Michael Levey junior (1837–1911) who stylised himself as a "Paganini Redivivus" (the reborn Paganini) and the operatic composer and conductor William Charles Levey (1837–1894). His great-grandson, Michael Levey (1927–2008), was director the National Gallery, London, from 1973 to 1986, and author of The Life and Death of Mozart (1971).

Levey lived to see the opening the new Theatre Royal in December 1897 and died in Dalkey, County Dublin in 1899, aged 87. He is buried in Glasnevin Cemetery.

== Assessment ==
Along with John William Glover, Joseph Robinson and his brothers, John Stanford (the father of C. V. Stanford), and Robert Prescott Stewart, Levey was part of a group of committed individuals who kept Dublin musical life going during economically difficult times.

A contemporary source described Levey as "an accomplished instrumentalist, a skilful composer, a firm but considerate director, an agreeable companion and a respected citizen". C. V. Stanford characterised him as "a great character, with a face which might have been the model for the typical Irishman of the comic papers. He was a rough player but an admirable leader of an orchestra".

Although his incidental music for orchestra does not seem to have survived, Levey's published music for piano, voice and ensembles is characterised by an assured technique and a light and humorous style. Most of Levey's extant compositions are quadrilles on topical and entertaining subjects of the day. They were published in piano arrangements for home use, but were in most cases publicly performed in band arrangements; some appear to derive from his music to comedies and plays at the Theatre Royal.

Together with John O'Rorke, Levey authored Annals of the Theatre Royal, Dublin (Dublin, 1880), which is an important source on the history of 19th-century Irish music and drama, written mostly in calendarial form.

== Selected works ==
Because not all dates can be established, works below are listed in alphabetical order ("n.d." = not dated).

=== Piano music ===
- Ali Baba, or The Forty Thieves Galop (London, 1873)
- Arrah-na-Pogue, or The Wicklow Wedding Quadrille (London: Metzler & Co., n.d.)
- Beauty and the Beast. A Christmas Quadrille (Dublin: Cramer & Co., n.d.)
- Forty Thieves Quadrilles (Dublin: Cramer & Co., c.1870)
- Kerry. Quadrille on Irish Airs (Dublin: Pigott & Co., c.1880)
- Little Red Riding Hood Quadrilles (London: Cramer & Co., c.1870)
- Robinson Crusoe Quadrilles (Dublin: Cramer, Wood & Co., 1870), online
- The Aladdin Quadrilles (Dublin: E. J. Harty, n.d.)
- The Babes in the Wood Quadrilles (Dublin: Bussell, n.d.)
- The Banjo Quadrilles ("selected from the most favorite negro melodies") (London: Cramer, Beale & Co., 1845); also as The Celebrated Banjo Quadrilles (Dublin: McCullagh & McCullagh, c.1850)
- The Celebrated National Medley Overture ("to the pantomime of O'Donohue of the Lakes") (London : Cramer, Addison & Beale, c.1840)
- The Enchanted Fawn, polka and waltz (Dublin: Robinson & Bussell, n.d.)
- The Favorite Medley Overture ("containing melodies of all nations") (London: C. Jefferys, 1849)
- The Fee-Faw-Fum Quadrilles (London: Cramer, Wood & Beale, n.d.)
- The Gulliver Quadrille (Dublin: Cramer, Wood & Co., n.d.)
- The Robinson Crusoe Galop ("Introducing the popular air 'O'Donnell a-boo'") (Dublin: M. Gunn & Sons, c.1870)
- The Second Set of Banjo Quadrilles ("selected from the most favorite negro melodies") (Dublin: Robinson & Bussell, c.1845)
- The Virginny Quadrilles ("containing all the favorite melodies sung by the Ethiopian Serenaders") (Dublin: J. Bray, n.d.)
- The White Cat Quadrilles (Dublin, 1871)
- The Yankee Gal, or My Mary Anne Quadrilles (Dublin: Wiseheart, 1857)
- The Yellow Dwarf Quadrilles (Dublin: Gunn & Sons, c.1890)

=== Ensemble music ===
- Carnival de Venise, for banjo and piano (London, 1874)
- Cracovienne, for banjo and piano (London, 1874)
- Phoul a Phuca Quadrilles, for cornet and piano (London, 1866)
- The Great Ka-foozle-um Galop, for cornet and piano (London, 1866)

=== Vocal music ===
- Erin's Daughter. A Beautiful Ballad (words by J. W. Duggan), for voice and piano (Dublin: J. Bray, n.d.)
- Kathleen's Farewell. Irish Ballad (words by J. W. Duggan), for voice and piano (London: c.1845)
- Limerick is Beautiful (words by Dion Boucicault), for voice and piano (London: Metzler & Co., 1866)
- Oh! I Love Him Dearly (Drimmin Dhu) (text author unknown), for voice and piano (London, 1866)
- Shannon Banks (text author unknown), for vocal quartet: SATB (Dublin: J. Bray, n.d.)

=== Folk music collection ===
- A Collection of the Dance Music of Ireland (London: C. Jefferys, 1858); reprinted as The Dance Music of Ireland (Dublin: Walton's, 1965 and 2003)

=== Book ===
- (with John O'Rorke) Annals of the Theatre Royal, Dublin. From its Opening in 1821 to its Destruction by Fire, February 1880 (Dublin: Joseph Dollard, 1880); online at archive.org

== Sources ==
- Beausang, Ita (2013). "Levey family". In Harry White; Barra Boydell (eds.). The Encyclopaedia of Music in Ireland. Dublin: UCD Press. pp. 587–589.
- Collins, Derek (2004). "Levey". Die Musik in Geschichte und Gegenwart (biographical part). Vol. 11. Kassel: Bärenreiter.
- Stanford, Charles V. (1914). Pages from an Unwritten Diary. London: Edward Arnold.
