= Charles Herbert Kitson =

British musician

Charles Herbert Kitson (13 November 1874 – 13 May 1944) was an English organist, teacher, and music educator, author of several books on harmony and counterpoint.

== Biography ==
Kitson was born in Leyburn, Yorkshire, and attended school in Ripon. Intending originally to take holy orders, he took his BA (1896) and MA (1904) at Cambridge, where he was organ scholar of Selwyn College. Between those dates, he also took the BMus (1897) and DMus (1902) degrees at Oxford, as an external student.

After teaching at Haileybury and St Edmund's School, Canterbury, he became organist of St John the Baptist, Leicester. His first important post was as organist at Christ Church Cathedral in Dublin, in 1913 – a post which he held until 1920 and which he combined with the post of Professor of Theory at the Royal Irish Academy of Music. During his stay in Dublin, he became Professor of Music at University College Dublin between 1916 and 1920, filling temporarily the post of Heinrich Bewerunge (1862–1923).

In 1920, he resigned both posts and returned to England, settling in London, where he joined the staff of the Royal College of Music. The same year, he also succeeded Percy Buck as Professor of Music at Trinity College, Dublin – a non-residential post, from which he retired in 1935. Among his notable pupils are Hubert Clifford, Arthur Duff, Arwel Hughes, John F. Larchet, Herbert Sanders, Robert Still, Michael Tippett, and S. Drummond Wolff.

He died in Kensington, London, where he was living at 5, Argyll Road, in 1944.

== Writings ==
- The Art of Counterpoint, and its Application as a Decorative Principle (London, 1907)
- The Evolution of Harmony (London, 1914)
- Applied Strict Counterpoint (London, 1916)
- Elementary Harmony, three volumes (London, 1920–26)
- Additional Exercises to Elementary Harmony (1926)
- Rudiments of Music (London, 1926)
- Counterpoint for Beginners (London, 1927)
- Invertible Counterpoint and Canon (London, 1927)
- The Elements of Fugal Construction (London, 1929)
- Six Lectures on Accompanied Vocal Writing (London, 1930)
- Contrapuntal Harmony for Beginners (London, 1931)
- Rudiments of Music for Junior Classes (London, 1931)
- The Elements of Musical Composition (London, 1936)

Composition – Introit for Whitsuntide – Fountain of Sweets (1931)

== Sources and external links ==
- Shaw, Watkins. "Kitson, Charles Herbert". Grove Music Online (subscription access)
- Entry for Kitson at Christ Church Cathedral website
- AIM25 entry for Kitson
