= Ailís Ní Ríain =

Irish composer and playwright

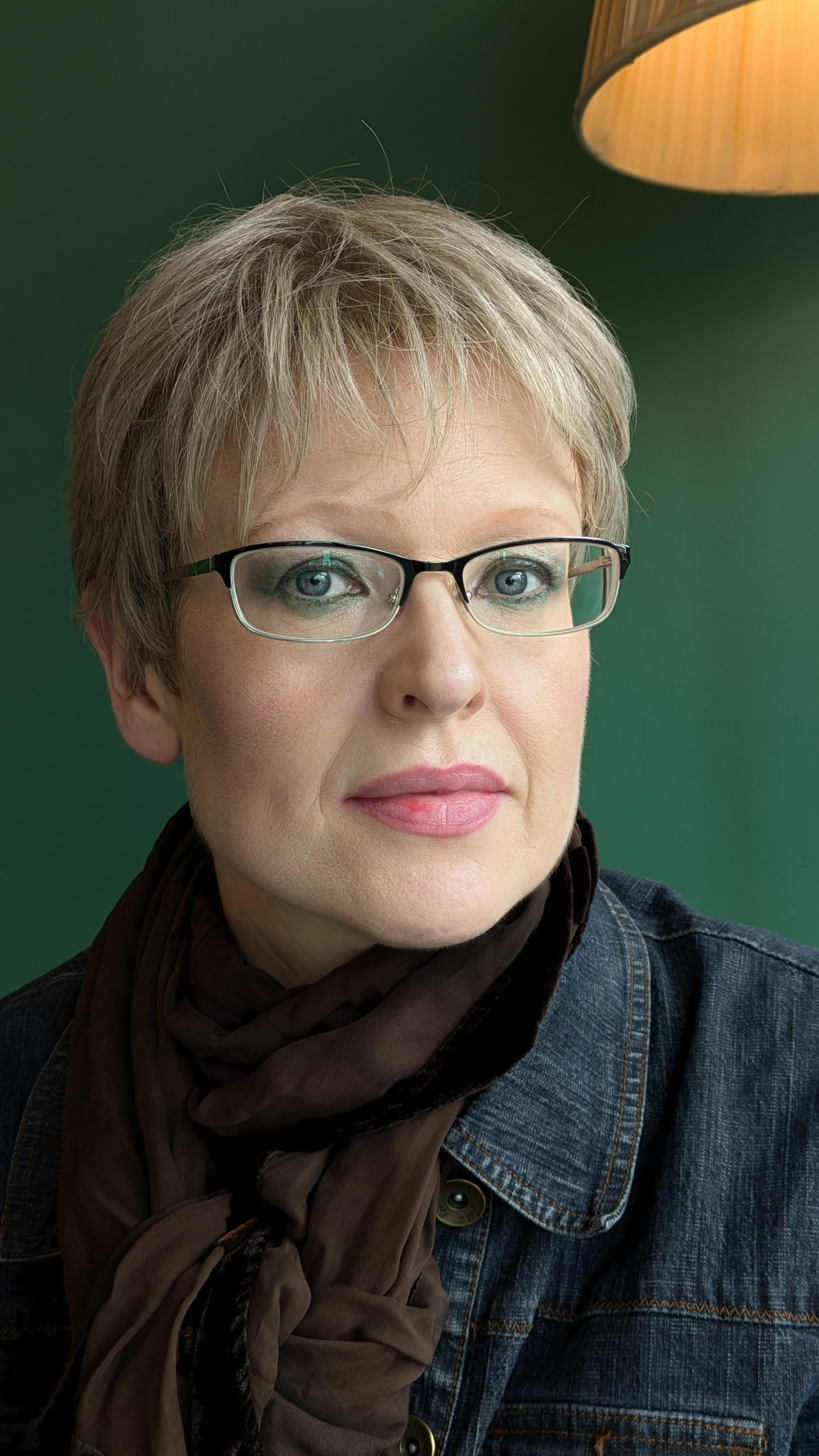

Ailís Ní Ríain (born 15 June 1974) is an Irish composer and playwright.

== Music ==
Born in Cork, Ireland. Ní Ríain is a deaf & hard of hearing contemporary classical composer. She was awarded the Paul Hamlyn Award for Composers in November 2016. Her music has been broadcast on BBC Radio 3, RTÉ and BBC Radio 4 and performed worldwide.

"A voice that is independent, exploratory and quirky.” – The Irish Times

Ní Ríain's Debut Disc The Last Time I Died, a portrait album, was released by NMC Recordings in 2023, to favourable reviews. She has worked with the RTÉ Concert Orchestra, The Royal Liverpool Philharmonic Ensemble 10/10, the BBC Philharmonic, Psappha, London Sinfonietta and leading solo interpreters of contemporary music.

Her output includes concert music, site-specific music installations, music-theatre and collaborations with artists working in other forms such as visual art, text, photography and illustration.

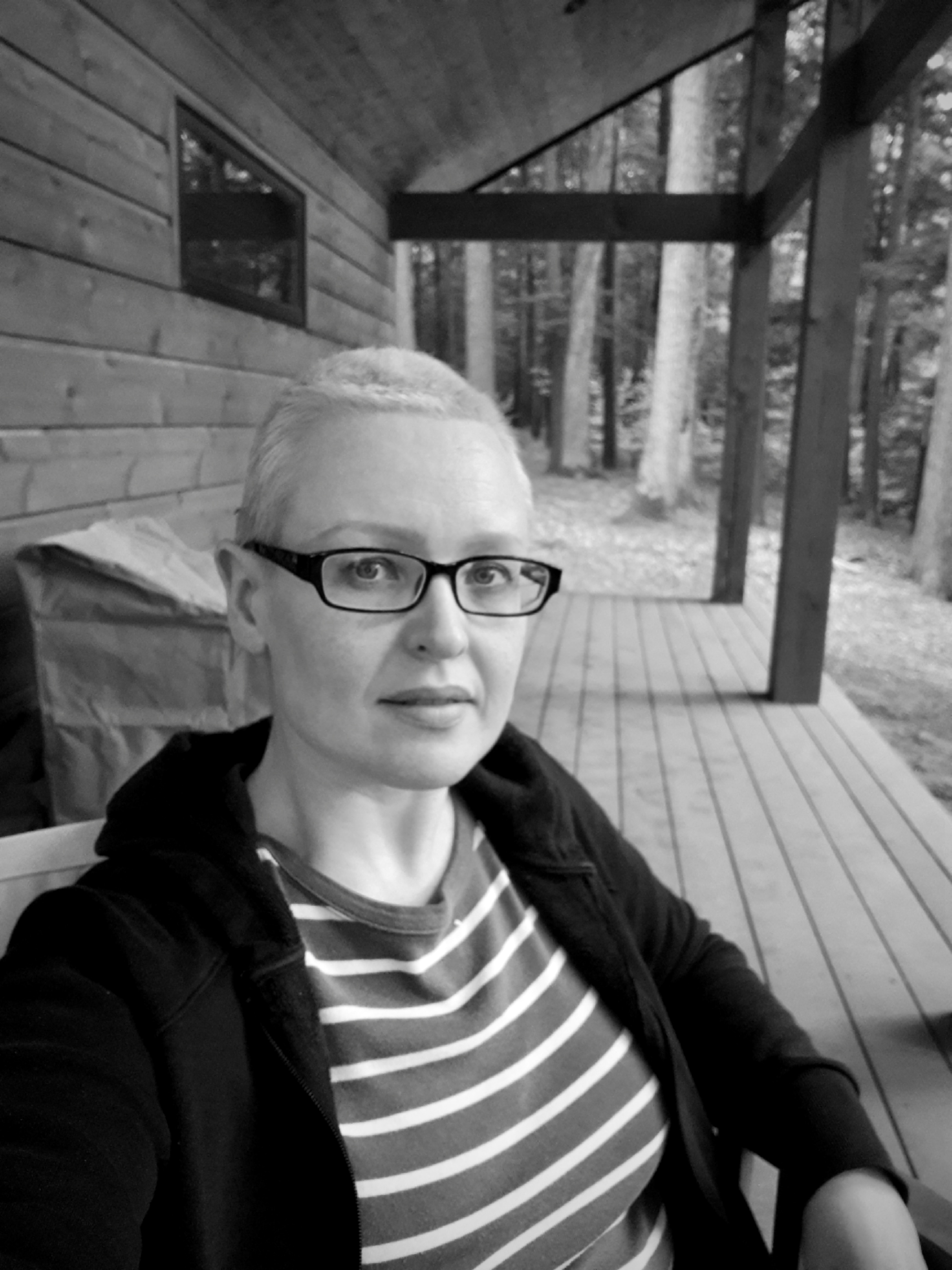
Ailís Ní Ríain, Yaddo Artist Colony, USA, 2019

"A highly original composer, with powerful and distinctive ideas" – Musical Opinion

As a pianist she has an interest in extended piano techniques, prepared piano and piano alterations. She has been a Fellow at the Ragdale Foundation, Illinois, USA, Virginia Center for the Arts, the Irish Cultural Centre in Paris and the Atlantic Center for the Arts in Florida.

"A fascinating interest in marrying sounds and resonances, unusual yet instructive.” – BBC Classical Music

She is represented by the Contemporary Music Centre, Dublin which holds a large collection of her works. The British Music Collection also holds a selection of her musical work.

== Writing ==
Ní Ríain's literary work is published by Bloomsbury and Nick Hern Books. She was awarded the Tom Erhardt Award, Peggy Ramsay Foundation Award and short-listed for the James Tait Black Award. Her first play, BEATEN, premiered in Liverpool and Glasgow in 2007. It has since been produced in Germany, Sweden, Ireland and London.

“The writing is fresh and true, it nibbles and gnaws at the heart.” – The Guardian

Desolate Heaven was first produced by Theatre503, London in 2013 and published by Methuen Drama. Subsequent production at the Everyman Palace Theatre in Cork, Ireland.

“A significant talent.” – The Irish Times

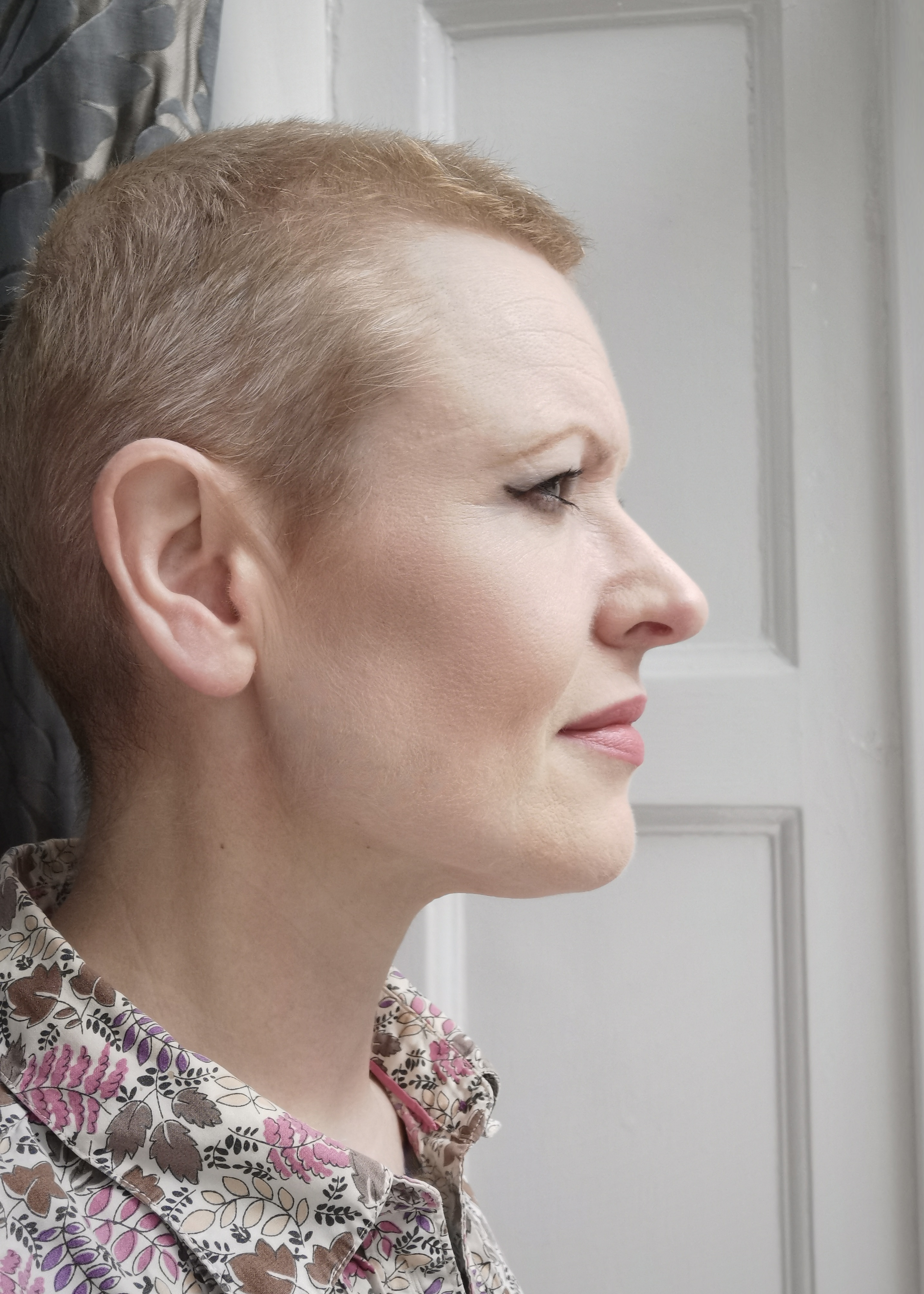
Ailís Ní Ríain

The Tallest Man in the World was premiered by Corcadorca Theatre Company [Ireland, 2014] and shortlisted for the Eugene O'Neill Playwright's Conference, USA. The American premiere of The Tallest Man in the World took place at The Tank Theater, New York in 2019.

‘A bleak journey through a nightmare. The play is special. It requires attention.’ – Bohuslaningen, Sweden

Ní Ríain's writing has been translated into French, German and Swedish. Her work in French translation is represented by L'Arche, France.

“The Tallest Man in the World weaves a haunting, poetic tale of love and loneliness.” – Theeasy.com [New York]

== Music works ==
=== Solo ===
- Counterweight (2024)
- Oneiric (2024)
- Contrair (2024)
- Doomed. Done For. Damned. And Still... (2023)
- Mascaron (2022)
- I will see if I can see/Feicfidh mé má thig liom feicsin (2022)
- Hiding Out 'neath the Everything (2021)
- Tick (2020)
- Our First Lesson in Forgetting (2019)
- Anomaly (2019)
- The Height of Me (2018)
- Soberado (2017)
- Sklonište (2016)
- Not About Heroes (2014)
- When I die, you can do what you want (2014)
- Treasured (2012)
- Beautiful Cracked Eyes (2008)
- Surrealist Pilgrims (2007)
- Into the Sea of Waking Dreams ... (2007)
- 2 Steep 4 Sheep (some hills are) (2006)
- The Falling (2005)
- Rude Boy (2002)
- Flat-Footed-Former-Flyer (2002)
- Dogs in Waiting (1999)

=== Duos ===
- Sour Morning Crimson (2020)
- Parambassis (2019)
- Highfalutin (2017)
- Consent #7 (2017)
- The Consequences of Falling (2013)
- Chainstitchembroidered (2012)
- Quantitas Speaks (2012)
- End with Words of Hope (2010)
- 10,000 Deviants (2007)
- FIRST ABSOLUTE EXECUTION (2004)
- DON'T! (2000)
- The Man Made of Rain (1999)

=== Trios/Quartets ===
- Born Unfixed to Bend and Break and Leave Behind [2023]
- Wait (2020)
- Soundless (2016)
- Reinventions (2010)
- UPTHEWALLS (2007)
- The Last Time I Died ... (2002)
- Under the Rose ... (2000)

=== Quartets/Quintets/Sextets ===
- Revelling/Reckoning (2021)
- Wait (2020)
- Dubinina's Tongue (2015)
- In Sleep ... (2010) [text. Ní Ríain]
- Orizzontale (1997)

=== Music-theatre/Opera/Theatre/Other ===
- Wired (2022)
- Break Down De Doom (2017) [text. Mac Wellman]
- I Used to Feel ... (2016) [text. Ní Ríain]
- Treasured (2020)
- Brief-Blue-Electric-Bloom (2010) [text. Ní Ríain]
- Sawn-off Opera (2006/09)
- The Falling (2005) [text. Ní Ríain]

=== Vocal ===
- Fáinleoga (2024)
- Refuse to the Wrecked (2023)
- From the Diary of an Exile (2022)
- Watershed (2020)
- A Crow's Wisp/Sop Préacháin (2019)
- Song of Letters (2016)
- Cimmerian (2015) [text. Ní Ríain]
- Eyeless (2012) [text. Ní Ríain]
- Spurious Balancing (2003) [text. Ní Ríain]
- Attrition (2001)
- A Song for My Body (1998)
- Two Eavan Boland Songs (1995/6)

=== Orchestral ===
- The Land Grows Weary of its Own (2023)
- Calling Mutely Through Lipless Mouth (2022)
- Flower Scar Road (2021)

=== Music installation ===
- Dendrocopos (2023)
- East:West - Where Morning is the Sea (2020)
- No Other Word For It (2019)
- Linger (2015/16)
- Intone (2013)
- Taken (2011-2012)
- Boy You Turn Me (2011)
- Pulse Prelude (2011)
- Down (2010)
- Conversations We Wish We'd Had (2010)
- Lighthouse Lullaby (2009)
- Stones (2008)
- StreetSong (2007)
- Missing Persons (2006)

=== Residencies and fellowships ===
- Yaddo, New York, United States
- Centre Culturel Irlandais in Paris, France
- Ragdale, Illinois, United States
- Bogliasco Foundation, Italy
- Virginia Center for the Creative Arts, United States
- OMI International, New York, United States
- The Atlantic Center for the Arts, Florida, United States
- Aldeburgh Artist Residency, Suffolk, UK
- Tyrone Guthrie Centre, Ireland
