= Cormac MacDermott (harper) =

Irish harper and composer

Cormac MacDermott (year of birth unknown – 26 February 1618), Irish harper and composer, was one of the best-known Irish harpers and a member of the "Royal Musick" (the official band of musicians) at the English court of James I. He was the only Irish composer at this period known to have written in a European Renaissance art music idiom.

== Life ==
MacDermott may have been a native of Moylurg, northern County Roscommon, whose ruling family were the Mac Diarmata (MacDermott) clan.

In 1590, he was employed by Sir Robert Cecil, 1st Earl of Salisbury, for whom he undertook at least five travels to Ireland to exchange personal correspondence between 1603 and 1611. In addition, in October 1605, he was appointed to the Royal Musick in London, the first harper since the death of Blind William More in 1565. He was succeeded on his death by his pupil Phillip Squire.

== Music ==
MacDermott's compositions survive in consort form only and Peter Holman suggested that it was MacDermott who brought this new consort-style of Irish harp-playing to the English court. Holman also published evidence to the effect that the harp used in William Lawes's harp consorts was not a gut-strung Italian triple harp but a wire-strung Irish harp. The original players in the early performances of the Lawes consorts were the MacDermott pupil Philip Squire and later Squire's pupil Lewis Evans, both on Irish harps.

In the most elaborate of the ten compositions for harp consort by William Lawes, the Royall Consort No. 9, a theme by MacDermott is the basis of the first movement.

== Recordings ==
- Exquisite Consorts – recorded by The Harp Consort, Andrew Lawrence-King (harps, direction), Berlin Classics 0011552BC (CD, 1995/2005); includes consort music by William Lawes and Henry Purcell, including the Paven in Consort No. 9 on a theme by Cormac MacDermott.
- Cormacke; Allmane; Mr. Cormake Allman; Schoch.a.torum Cormacke – recorded by Andrew Lawrence-King on historical harps: Deutsche Harmonia Mundi 05472 77504 2 (CD, 1999).
- Sir John Packington's Pavin; Allmane; Mr. Cormake's Pavin; Mr. Cormake's Allman – recorded by Siobhán Armstrong (Irish harp) and The Irish Consort: Destino Classics DC 1801 (CD, 2018).

== Bibliography ==
- Seán Donnelly: "An Irish Harper and Composer: Cormac MacDermott (?–1618)", in Ceól vol. 8 (1986), no. 1&2 (July), pp. 40–50.
- Peter Holman: "The Harp in Stuart England", in Early Music vol. 15 (1987), pp. 188–203.
- John Cunningham: "'Irish harpers are excellent, and their solemn music is much liked of strangers': The Irish Harp in Non-Irish Contexts in the Seventeenth Century", in Barra Boydell, Kerry Houston (eds): Music, Ireland and the Seventeenth Century (= Irish Musical Studies 10) (Dublin: Four Courts Press, 2009), pp. 62–80.
