= Michael Alcorn =

Contemporary Irish composer

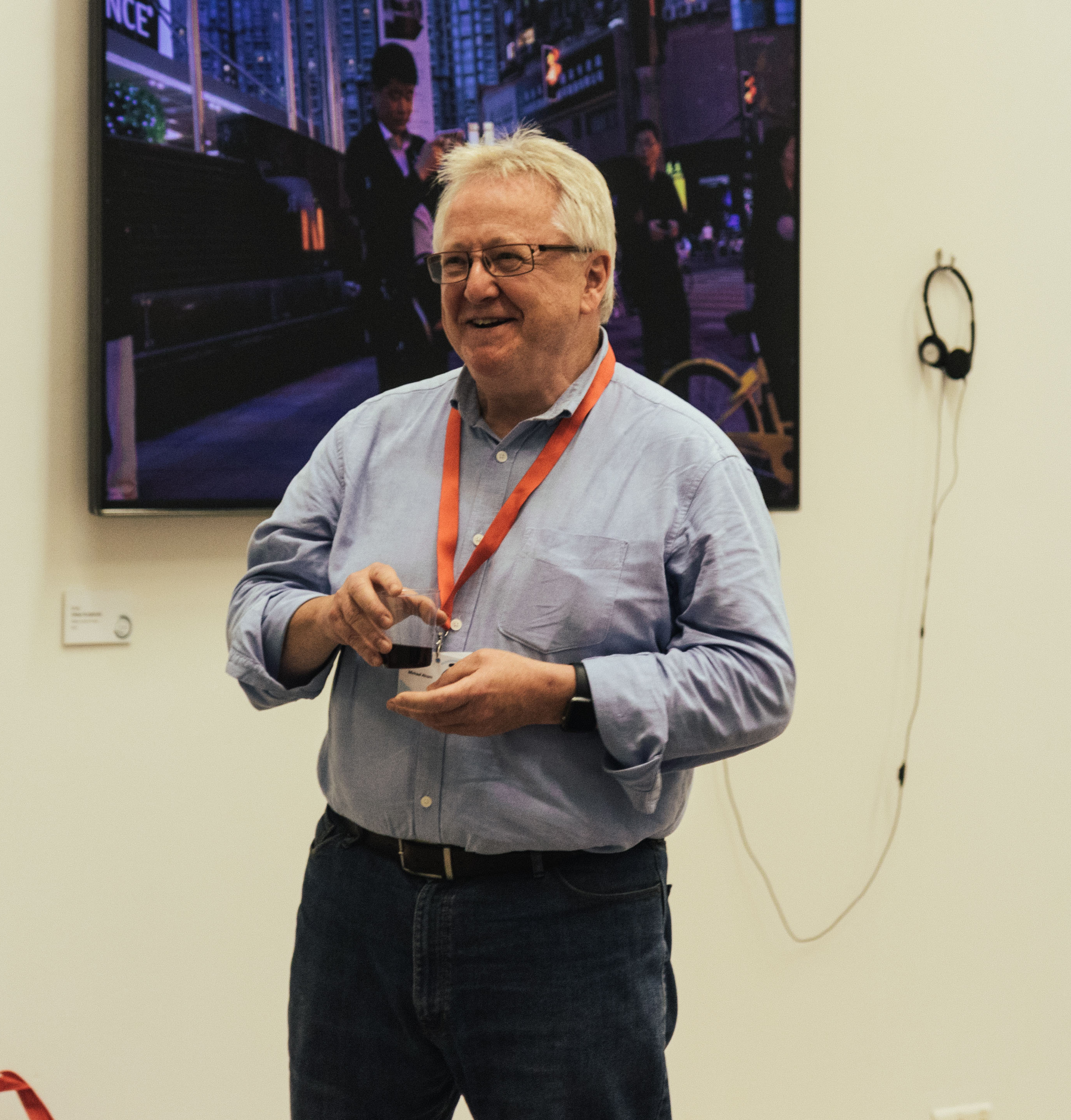
Alcorn in 2019

Michael Peter Alcorn MBE (born 22 January 1962) is a full-time academic and current director of the School of Music and Sonic Arts at Queen's University, Belfast and a partite composer. He was born in Belfast, Northern Ireland.

Michael Alcorn studied at the University of Ulster and completed a PhD in composition with John Casken at the University of Durham. In 1989 he was appointed composer-in-residence at Queen's University, Belfast, where he continues to teach in the School of Music. He is particularly active as a promoter of new music technologies and was appointed director of SARC, the Sonic Arts Research Centre based at Queen's University, Belfast, in 2001. He has been a visiting composer at the Center for Computer Research in Music and Acoustics at Stanford University, and at Simon Fraser University, Vancouver.

His compositional activities range from music for conventional instruments to works for live or taped electro-acoustic performance. His music has been performed and broadcast in the UK, Europe, North and South America and the Far East.

He serves as the musical director of Downshire Brass.
