= Thomas Carter (composer) =

Irish composer

Thomas Carter (May 1769 – 8 November 1800) was an Irish composer resident in London during the most creative years of his short life.

== Life ==
Carter probably belonged to an extended family of Dublin musicians including, among others, Timothy Carter (c. 1715–1772) and (Charles) Thomas Carter (c. 1735–1804), with whose works his were often confused as both published music in London in the 1790s and used to abbreviate their name as "T. Carter". Other sources suggest that he was an illegitimate son of the Earl of Inchiquin.

He was born in Dublin and seems to have shown an exceptional musical talent since his childhood. Sponsored by the Earl of Inchiquin, he went to study music in Naples, around 1788, where he became a protégé of Sir William Hamilton. He then went to Calcutta, India, to become the theatre's music director, but had to relocate to England in July 1789 for health reasons. He married Mary Wells from Cookham, Berkshire, in 1793.

When he died in London at age 31, the Gentleman's Magazine described him as "a victim, in early life, to the fatal ravages of the liver complaint".

== Music ==
In The New Grove Dictionary of Music and Musicians (1980 edition), Roger Fiske made the first attempt to distinguish between the works of Thomas Carter and his near-namesake (Charles) Thomas Carter. According to him, many songs published after 1793 can be attributed to Thomas, including the duet Goodman White and Gaffer Grey op. 24 (c. 1796) and a Canzonet op. 25 (c. 1796) for one or two voices, as well as the collection Songs, Duos, Trios, Catches, Glees and Canons op. 27 (n.d.). These pieces were published "for the composer" (that is, at his own expense), with Fiske assuming that the marriage to Miss Wells brought him money. The list would also include the Six Easy Lessons for the Harpsichord or Pianoforte op. 3 (n.d.). As his wife was from Berkshire, the Berkshire Militia March (c. 1795) may also be his.
