= William Henry Kearns =

Irish composer

William Henry Kearns (1794 – 28 December 1846) was an Irish violinist, conductor and composer active mainly in England.

== Biography ==
Kearns was born in Dublin and, like many of his Irish contemporaries, emigrated to England where he settled at least since 1817. Nothing is known about his musical education, but in London he was employed as a violinist in the orchestra of the Covent Garden opera house (principal first violin for the season 1818–9) and as organist at the Verulam Episcopal Chapel, Lambeth. On 16 July 1817 his operetta Bachelor's Wives, or The British at Brussels received its first performance at the English Opera House (EOH) and "enjoyed a substantial run". Kearns did not compose any further operas, but was later employed at the EOH as musical advisor to the directors, Samuel James Arnold and William Hawes. He also conducted noteworthy performances of Carl Maria von Weber's Der Freischütz, Louis Spohr's Zemire und Azor and Giacomo Meyerbeer's Robert le diable. Weber's original copy of the overture to Oberon was given to Kearns by William Hawes in 1827 "as a token of regard and friendship". He also didn't give up the violin; among other events he played at the Royal Musical Festival held at Westminster Abbey in 1834.

For George Smart's 1831 adaptation of Spohr's opera, Kearns composed the piano accompaniments, later having the same role for an 1839 London performance of Joseph Haydn's The Seasons and an 1837 performance of August Ferdinand Haeser's oratorio The Triumph of Faith. In 1845, he produced an adaptation of Deh prendi un dolce amplesso from Mozart's La clemenza di Tito, which became The Young Protestant's Hymn ("We won't give up the bible"). Kearns also composed additional wind accompaniments to Handel's Messiah and Israel in Egypt. Together with Henry John Gauntlett, he was co-editor of The Comprehensive Tune Book (London, 1846). Kearns died in London.

== Bibliography ==
- John Parry: An Account of the Royal Musical Festival held in Westminster Abbey 1834 (London, 1834), p. 34.
- Theodore Fenner: Opera in London. Views of the Press, 1785–1830 (Carbondale, Illinois: SIU Press, 1994), p. 378.
