= Deirdre Gribbin =

Irish composer

Deirdre Gribbin (born 14 May 1967) is a composer from Northern Ireland.

== Career ==
Gribbin was born in Belfast. She studied at Queen's University Belfast where, at the age of twenty, she began to compose. Further studies were in London (at the Guildhall School of Music with (Robert Saxton) and in Denmark (with Per Nørgård). Her first professional success came when her piano piece Per Speculum in Aenigmate won the Huddersfield Contemporary Music Festival Composition Prize.

Subsequent major works have included the piano quartet Jack B. (inspired by the work of the Irish painter Jack B. Yeats), the piano trio How to Make the Water Sound, the opera Hey Persephone!, the violin concerto Venus Blazing, which was directed by Lou Stein with lighting by Jeff Ravitz, and The Binding of The Years, for piano and orchestra. Celestial Pied Piper was published as part of Faber's Millennium Series. She lived in New York where she was a Fulbright Fellow. Several of her works respond to the political climate of her homeland, such as the ensemble piece Tribe, the orchestral work Unity of Being, which was performed by the Ulster Orchestra as part of the UK WITH NY Festival in New York after 9/11, and her epic percussion concerto Goliath, premiered at the Belfast Festival in 2006.

She has written extensively for radio including music for The Possessed, starring Benedict Cumberbatch and Embers, starring Patrick Stewart. She wrote the music for Sky Picture's My Kingdom, starring Richard Harris and her string quartet Hearing your genes Evolve, based on DNA was featured in the Filmtank Production The Dark Gene.

She won an award in the 2003 UNESCO International Rostrum of Composers with her orchestral work Empire States, and an Arts Foundation Award for her first opera Hey Persephone!. She was Artistic Director of the London-based Society for the Promotion of New Music (SPNM), 2003–05. Richard Morrison of the Times wrote of her in June 2004: "This Belfast born composer is one of the most original thinkers in years."

In 2019, The Arts Council of Northern Ireland awarded Gribbin a Major Individual Award.

Gribbin lectures in composition at Trinity Laban Conservatoire of Music and Dance in Greenwich.

In 2020 Gribbin won a PRS Composers' Award.
