= Eoin O'Keeffe =

Irish composer

Eoin O'Keeffe is an Irish composer and arranger.

== Biography ==
O'Keeffe grew up in Clonmel, Ireland. As a member of his local youth band, he played clarinet and later trumpet, before spending some time as conductor and arranger. He studied for a BA Music at Waterford Institute of Technology between 1997 and 2001, where he graduated with a First Class Honours Degree, majoring in composition having studied with Eric Sweeney, as well as composers such as Louis Andriessen. During his time in Waterford, he was awarded with the Good Shepherd Arts Award for his composition. He also conducted the college chamber choir between 2000 and 2001, giving the opportunity to develop his choral writing. He then graduated from University College Cork with a Higher Diploma in Education in 2002 and spent several years working in the education sector, initially in Ireland before moving to London, England. While teaching in London, he continued his studies in composition with composers such as Anna Meredith, Stephen Montague, and Howard Skempton. He studied at the Guildhall School of Music and Drama, London between 2005 and 2007, studying with Richard Baker and graduating with an MA Composition. He lived in Brighton from 2008, before returning to Ireland in 2014.

== Performance and reception ==
He has had his music performed in the UK, including performances in the opening ceremony of the 2007 New Music Festival at the Guildhall, the 2006 City of London Festival, the 2007 London New Wind Festival, as well as on tour with the Trillium Quartet with a specially commissioned piece. His music has also been performed in Ireland, the Czech Republic and USA.

His music has been reviewed in Tempo magazine which was followed up by a seminar by the architect John Wheatley on Music and Architecture at the Royal Academy of Music. Examples of his music can be found in Notations 21, a book inspired by John Cage's "Notations". This music has also featured in an art exhibition at the Chelsea Art Museum, New York as part of the launch of the aforementioned book.

In addition to his work as a composer, O'Keeffe is in demand as an arranger particularly of wind and orchestral music in Ireland, the UK, and Europe, and has maintained his links with the music education sector, involved in teaching a number of different projects in the UK and abroad and has been involved in creating music for a number of other performing groups. He is in particular demand as an arranger for wind bands, and has written for numerous bands in the UK, Ireland, Netherlands and Italy.

== Style ==
Tonality is the key feature of his music. Earlier pieces were very highly structured, and after a period of aleatoric and improvisation-based composition, reliance on intuition came to the forefront of his music, as well as the use of humour and references to traditional Irish music. Throughout his music, there is a very minimalist approach taken, with little in the way of dynamics or articulation, and a tendency to concentrate on one simple idea.

== Selected works ==
- Motion (Pno, 4 hands)
- Ave Maria (SATB – 4.4.4.4)
- TRIumph (Cl, Hn, Pno)
- Lines & Spaces (8 violins, 7 cellos)
- Flight (Fl, Ob, Cl, Bsn, Strings - 5.5.3.3.2)
- 4 x 1 = 24 (Recorded violin)
- 4 for T (4 tpts)
- Out of Motion (Pno, 4 hands)
- Imitation (2 pianos)
- Ave Maria (revision 1) (SATB – 4.4.4.4)
- U-turn (Cl, S.Sax, T.Sax, Hn, Cnt, Tbn, B.Tbn)
- Pass it on… (6 woodwind instruments, Pno)
- Deciduous (Wind Quintet)
- Pass it along… (5 woodwind instruments)
- Telling God’s Story (SATB)
- Trio and Over again (Fl, Vla, Hrp)
- The Uncivilised Discussion (String Quartet)
- Onwards (2 pianos - 6 hands)
- The Crossing (Brass Ensemble)
- John 12:46 (SATB)
- The night before the morning after (Voice and piano)
- Game Show (S.Sax, Tpt, Tbn, Tuba)
- Ave for Brass (Brass Quartet)
- Meditation (Soprano and piano)
- Conditions (Soprano and piano)
- Remote Control (S.Sax, C.A., Tbn, Vib, Kbrd)
- Medite(r)ranean (Soprano and piano)
- Tritonic (2 x T.Sax, 2 x Tpt, 2 x Hn, 2 x Tbn, Perc)
- Lost and Found (Ob, Cl, Hn, Tpt, Tbn, Pno)
- Now go we in content (2 x Cl, 2 x Hn, 2 x T.Sax, 2 x Tbn, Glock)
- Ave a la sax (Saxophone Quartet)
- Spherical Cube (Saxophone Quartet)
- Dipsochelys (Wind Quintet)
- Ave Maria (revision 2) (SATB – 4.4.4.4)
- Through the Menai Strait (Symphony Orchestra)
- Seasca 1 (Pno)
- Seasca 2 (Cl and Pno)
- Seasca 3 (Pno)
- Three statements for vibes (4 x Vib, 8 players)
- Trash heap sketches (Symphony Orchestra)
- Trash heap surplus (Cl, 2 x T Sax, 2 x Hn, 2 x Tpt, Tbn, B. Tbn, Tuba, Perc, Pno)
- Because (Cl and Pno)
- Escape (2 x Fl, 2 x Cl, A.Sax, T.Sax, Hn, Tpt, Tbn, Euph, Tuba, Xyl, Mar, Vib)
- The Dark Forest (2 x Cl, A.Sax, Hn, 2 x Tpt, Tbn, Euph, Tuba, Glock, Xyl)
- Streets and Shadows (2 x Cl, A.Sax, T.Sax, 2 x Tpt, Euph, Tuba, Mar, Vib)
- Emergence (2 x Tpt, 1 x Mln, 2 x Euph, Tuba, Tub. B, Xyl, Mar, Vib, Bass guit, Kbd)
- Matter of Time (2 x Fl, Cl, 2 x A.Sax, 2 x T.Sax, 3 xTpt, 1 x Hn, 2 x Tbn, Tuba, Glock, 2 x Xyl, Mar)
- Harvest (Cl, 2 x Tpt, ASax, Euph, Glock)
- Process (2 x Tpt, 2 x Mln, 2 x Euph, Tuba, 2 x Mar, Vib)
- Enmity (2 x Tpt, 2 x Mln, Euph, Tuba, Xyl, Mar, Elec guit, Bass guit)
- Ninety-seven seconds of something (Fl, Cl, Tbn, Vib, Pft, Elec guit, Vln, Vla, VC, DB)
- Diffract (2 x Fl, 2 x Cl, 2 x A.Sax, 2 x Tpt, Hn, 2 x Tbn, Tuba, Mar, Glock, 2 x Xyl, Kbd)
- Subterranean (2 x Tpt, Hn, Euph, Tuba, 2 x Mar, Vib)
- Struggle (2 x Cl, 2 x A.Sax, Tpt, Euph)
- Sea Rising (Fl, Ob, Cl, Bsn, Hn, Tpt, A.Tbn, B.Tbn, Strings - 4.4.3.3.2)
- Learning the Ropes (2 x Fl, 2 x Cl, 2 x A Sax, 2 x Tpt, Hn, 2 x Tbn, Tuba, Mar, Glock, 2 x Xyl)
- Strings Attached (2 x Fl, 2 x Cl, 2 x A Sax, 2 x Tpt, Hn, 2 x Tbn, Tuba, Mar, 2 x Xyl)
- Mobility (2 x Fl, 2 x Cl, 2 x A Sax, 2 x Tpt, Hn, 2 x Tbn, Tuba, Mar, Glock, 2 x Xyl)
- Hydrological (2 x Tpt, Hn, Euph, Tuba, 2 x Mar, Vibes)
- Estuary (2 x Tpt, Hn, Euph, Tuba, 2 x Mar, Vibes)
- Hydraulic (2 x Tpt, Hn, Euph, Tuba, 2 x Mar, Vibes)
- Joy (2 x Tpt, Hn, 2 x Euph, Tuba, 2 x Mar, 2 x Vibes)
- Disarray (2 x Tpt, Hn, 2 x Euph, Tuba, 2 x Mar, 2 x Vibes)
- Current (2 x Fl, 2 x Cl, 2 x A Sax, 2 x Tpt, Hn, 2 x Tbn, Tuba, Glock, 2 x Xyl, Vibes, Kbd)
- Passage (2 x Fl, 2 x Cl, 2 x A Sax, 2 x Tpt, 2 x Hn, 2 x Tbn, Tuba, Glock, Mar, Vibes, Kbd)
- Revive (2 x Fl, 2 x Cl, 2 x A Sax, 2 x Tpt, Hn, 2 x Tbn, Tuba, Glock, 2 x Xyl, Vibes, Kbd)
- Re-current (2 x Fl, 2 x Cl, 2 x A Sax, 2 x Tpt, Hn, 2 x Tbn, Tuba, Glock, Mar, Vibes, Kbd)
- A Little Light (4 pianos, Kbd, Tbells, Glock, Vib)
- Seasca 4 (Organ)
- Seasca 5 (2 x Tpt, Gtr, Strings)
- Seasca 6 (Pno)
