= Joseph Augustine Wade =

Irish composer (1801–1845)

Joseph Augustine Wade (c.1801 – 15 July 1845) was an Irish composer, conductor and lyricist. Wade was popular in his lifetime, and he was quoted in the 1919 Bartlett's Familiar Quotations.

== Life and career ==
Wade was born in Dublin and may have worked as a surgeon before moving to London in 1821. For a short period he was conductor at the King's Theatre. He had some success with his oratorio The Prophecy (1824) and the comic opera The Two Houses of Grenada (1826).

Wade was known for his arrangement of Peter Gray as well as for popular songs that included I've Wandered in Dreams, Love was Once a Little Boy, A Woodland Life, and his most famous, Meet me by Moonlight. Walt Whitman referred to Wade, having his eponymous hero in Samuel Sensitive sing a phrase of Wade's Meet me by Moonlight.

His son Joseph Augustine Wade jr. was also a composer.

== Selected works ==
Stage

- Two Houses of Granada, comic opera (1826)
- The Convent Belles, comic opera (1833)
- The Yeoman's Daughter, musical play (1834)
- The Pupil of Da Vinci, burletta (1839)

Vocal

- Come Buy me Cherries (c.1820)
- The Hermit of Killarney, Irish ballad (c.1820)
- The Prophecy, oratorio (1824)
- Hours There Were, ballad (1825)
- Where Stays my Lover's Barque, ballad for 3 voices (c.1825)
- Farewell Sweet Whispering Echo, glee (c.1826)
- Say Will Summer Roses Bloom, duet (c.1828)
- Meet me by Moonlight, ballad (c.1830)
- Shula Agra, Irish ballad (c.1830)
- The Faithless One (c.1830)
- Polish Melodies (1831)
- I have Fruit, I have Flow'rs, cavatina (c.1840)

Piano

- A Grand Duet for Two Performers on the Piano Forte (1827)

== Writings ==
- The Hand-Book to the Piano Forte (London, 1844)
