= Charles Clagget =

Irish composer and instrument maker

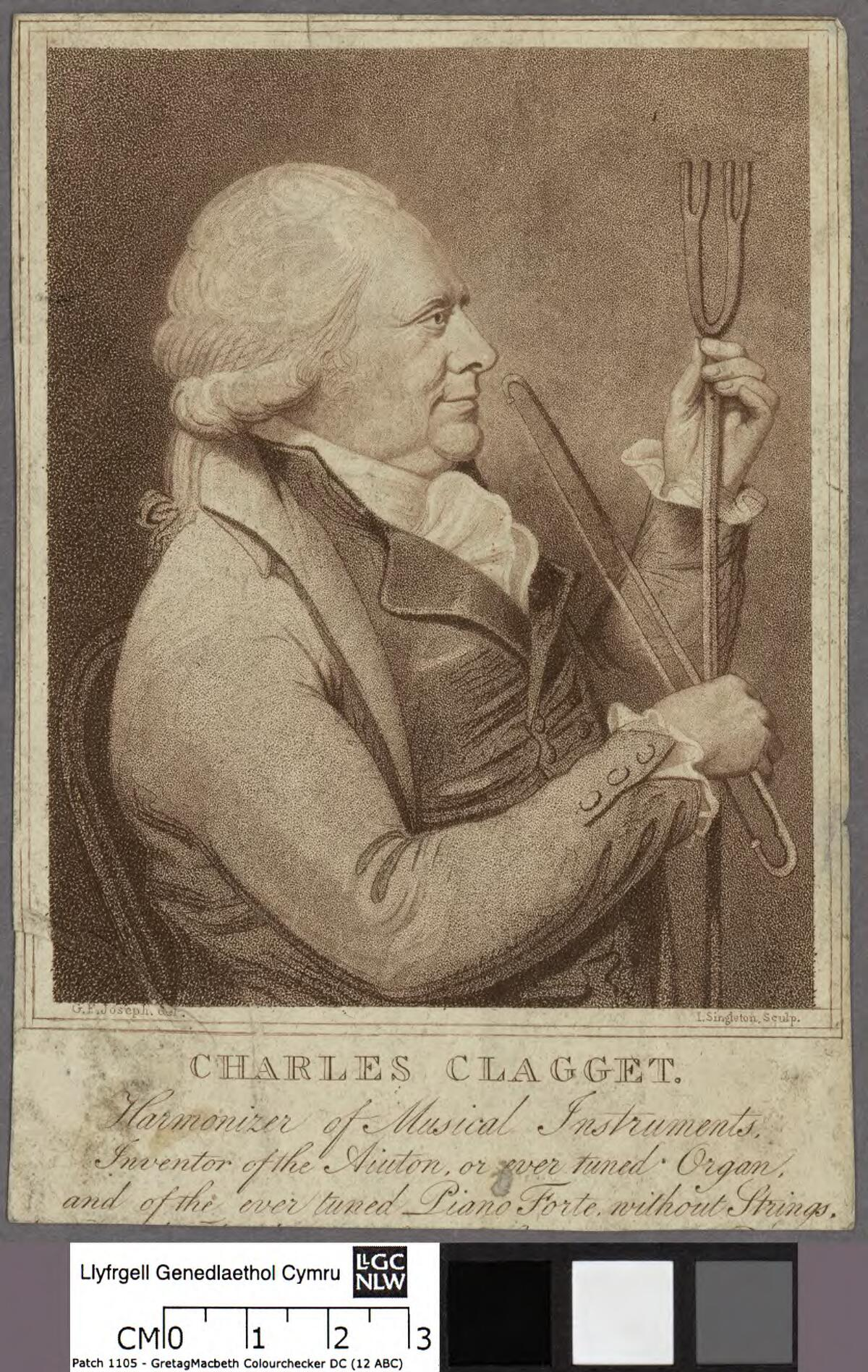
Portrait of Charles Clagget, published with his "Discourse on Musick". He is holding a violin bow and a large tuning fork, each prong of which is bifurcated, so that there are three forks in one.

Charles Clagget [also spelled Claget, Claggett, Claggitt] (1740 – c.1795) was an Irish musician, composer, and inventor of improvements for musical instruments.

== Early career ==
Clagget was born in Waterford, Ireland, in 1740. He led theatre bands in Dublin (Smock Alley, 1762–4; Rotunda and Crow Street, 1763–7), Liverpool (1771–3), Manchester (1773–5) and Newry (1778–9). In 1776, he patented his earliest invention, a fingerboard for the violin and other stringed instruments, marked to show the position of tones and semitones, with movable nuts for changing keys without changing hand position.

In 1788, in patent declaration no. 1664, he patented:

1. a new stringed instrument called the teliochordon;
2. a new method of constructing the keys of keyed instruments, which avoided "any danger of touching one key for another";
3. a method of mellowing the tone of strings of keyboard instruments, by fixing vellum to the instrument frame;
4. the construction of glass or enamelled keys for keyboard instruments, instead of wood or ivory;
5. a celestina stop in which the tone was produced by the scraping of silk strings;
6. chromatic trumpet and French horn;
7. a new design for tuning-forks;
8. an instrument consisting of a number of tuning-forks mounted on sound-boxes and set in vibration by a keyboard;
9. a new kind of tuning-key for harpsichords and other instruments;
10. a better method of fitting the sound-post of a violin to its place.

== In London ==
Clagget constructed a "teliochordon" stop for the royal harpsichord, which was delivered to Buckingham Palace on 17 December 1790. In the early 1790s his home in Greek Street, Soho, contained a musical museum, in which he exhibited and sold his inventions.

In about 1791 he exhibited his musical instruments at the Hanover Square Rooms. In the following year Joseph Haydn, who was then in London, called at Greek Street and examined Clagget's inventions, endorsing them in a letter which appeared in the Morning Herald of 27 April. On 31 October 1793 he gave an "Attic Concert" at the King's Arms, Cornhill, where he delivered a "Discourse on Musick", which was later published with a portrait of Clagget.

None of Clagget's inventions survived. "(T)he lack of detailed explanation in the wording of his patent would make a modern reconstruction well-nigh impossible." Yet, Clagget was the first inventor to both theorise and put into practice the principles of modern valved brass instruments.

== Selected compositions ==
- I've Rifled Flora's Painted Bower, for voice and keyboard (in: The London Magazine, 1768, p. 49)
- Blest as th'Immortal Gods Is He, for voice and guitar (London, c.1770)
- 'Tis All Over Now, for voice and guitar (London, c.1770)
- Jolly Health (by 'Mr Clagget' [Charles or Walter?]), for voice and guitar (London, c.1770)
- Nature's Magic Skill ("by Mr Charles Clagget of Waterford"), for voice, violin, keyboard; or: voice, flute and guitar (London, 1780[?])
- Fidelity, a Favorite Canzonett, for voice and keyboard (London, 1784)
- Oh Beauteous Maid, for voice and keyboard (London, c.1790)
- Divertimento a 4 Instruments, for 2 violins, horn, double bass (London, 1790)

Together with his brother Walter Clagget (1742–1798; a theatre musician in London) he published:

- Forty Lessons and Twelve Songs for Citra or Guitar (Edinburgh, n.d. [c.1760])
- Six Duetts for Two Violins, Intended to Improve and Entertain Practitioners (Edinburgh, c.1760)
- A New and Complete Tutor for the Violoncello [...] to Which is Annexed [...] a Selection of Admired Italian, French, English, Scotch & Irish Airs (London, c.1785)
