= George Alexander Osborne =

Irish composer and pianist

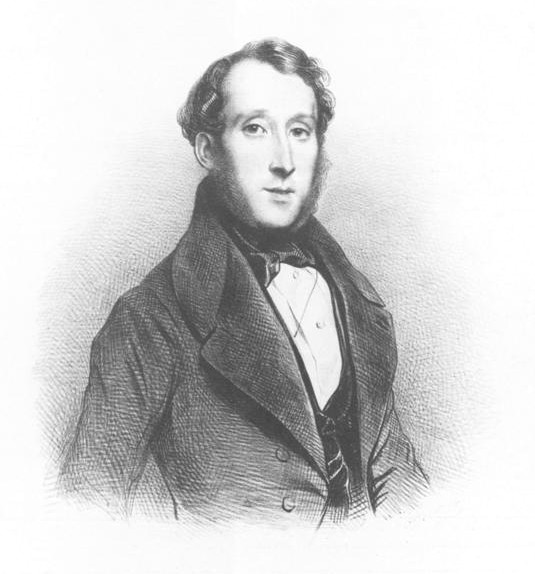
George Alexander Osborne (1806–1893), Irish pianist and composer

George Alexander Osborne (24 September 1806 – 16 November 1893) was an Irish composer and pianist.

== Biography ==
Osborne was born in Limerick. His father, also George, was a music teacher and organist in St Mary's cathedral. Young George joined him in that profession, becoming organist in St John's Church, John St. He left Ireland at the age of eighteen for Brussels, where he was appointed music instructor for the eldest son of the Dutch king, and became friends with Charles de Bériot. With de Bériot he was later to compose more than 30 duos for violin and piano, which enjoyed great popularity. In 1830 he fought for the royalists in the Belgian revolution, and after his capture and release he moved to Paris. Here he studied under Johann Peter Pixis, François-Joseph Fétis and Friedrich Kalkbrenner and became friendly with some of the leading musicians of his time including Berlioz and Chopin. In 1843, Osborne settled permanently in London, although he maintained a home in Paris until c.1848, when he encouraged a nervous Chopin during the latter's tour of England in 1848.). In London he held directorships of the Philharmonic Society, the Royal Academy of Music, and conducted the Amateur Musical Society (from 1852). Osborne died at his home in Regent's Park, London, at the age of 87 and was buried on the western side of Highgate Cemetery. His grave (no.3350) has no headstone or marker.

== Music ==
Osborne's compositions were mostly on a small scale and included 83 original piano works, 178 transcriptions and fantasias for piano solo, 24 piano duos, 44 vocal works, 55 chamber music pieces; his unpublished works included two operas and some orchestral overtures, now lost. Berlioz observed that Osborne's songs and trios were ‘lofty in style and spacious in design’. One of Osborne's most popular compositions was a piano piece entitled La Pluie de perles (Shower of Pearls), which went through many editions. Some of his piano music was written to display his own virtuosity, while others were conceived as salon music for domestic entertainment.

== Recordings ==
- Duo brillant à quatre mains op. 69 (c. 1850), performed by Bruce Posner & Donald Garvelmann, on: Koch International 3-7287-2H1 (CD, 1994).
- Isabella Valse op. 34 (1845); Piano Trio No. 3 in G major op. 52 (1846); La Pluie des perles op. 61 (1848); Ireland. Fantasia on Favourite Irish Airs (1853); Evening Dew. Morceau de salon op. 90 (1853); Fantasia on Balfe's Opera 'The Rose of Castile' (1857); Cello Sonata (1876), performed by Una Hunt (piano), Justin Pearson (cello), Triantán (piano trio), on: RTÉ Lyric fm CD 103 (CD, 2004).
- Pauline Nocturne (1841) & La Nouvelle pluie de perles (1849), performed by Una Hunt (piano), on: RTÉ Lyric fm CD 109 (CD, 2006).
- (collaboration with Heinrich Wilhelm Ernst) Souvenir de l'Opéra 'La Juive' de F. Halévy (c.1835), performed by Sherban Lupu (violin) & Ian Hobson (piano), on: Toccata Classics TOCC 0163 (CD, 2012).

== Bibliography ==
- Una Hunt: George Alexander Osborne, a Nineteenth-Century Irish Pianist-Composer (PhD, National University of Ireland at Maynooth, 2006).
- Una Hunt in The Encyclopaedia of Music in Ireland, eds. Harry White & Barra Boydell (Dublin: UCD Press, 2013), vol. 2, pp. 808–10, ISBN 978-1-906359-78-2.
