= Philip Cogan =

Irish composer

- Born: 1750; Cork
- Died: 3 February 1833 (aged 82–83) Dublin
- Occupations: Composer; conductor
- Instrument: Piano

Philip Cogan (1750 – 3 February 1833) was an Irish composer, pianist, and conductor.

== Biography ==
Cogan was born in Cork, where he was a choirboy and vicar choral at St Fin Barre's Cathedral. In 1772, he was appointed a stipendiary at Christ Church Cathedral, Dublin, but left the post a few months later due to ill health. From 1780 to 1806 he was organist at St Patrick's Cathedral. He also conducted the orchestras of the Smock Alley and Crow Street theatres "to the detriment of his church duties". In fact, Cogan's compositions for the stage outnumber those for the church by far. He not only wrote operas himself (The Rape of Proserpine, 1776; The Ruling Passion, 1778; etc.), but also collaborated with other Dublin composers, as in The Contract (1782, with John Andrew Stevenson, Tommaso Giordani, and one Laurent).

In 1787, Cogan was a co-founder of the Irish Musical Fund Society. He was an active participant in Dublin's musical life for many years including performances in the annual "Commemoration of Handel" festivals at the Rotunda and at various charity concerts in both Catholic and Protestant churches. Cogan was a much sought-after teacher and counted among his pupils a number of noteworthy names in Irish musical history such as Michael Kelly, Thomas Moore, P.K. Moran, William Michael Rooke and, most likely, Thomas Augustine Geary. In 1817 he conducted a concert, which also marked the first public appearance of the young Michael William Balfe. He was often called "Doctor Cogan", but there is no evidence that he ever studied at Dublin's Trinity College. Cogan enjoyed a long and prosperous life; he died at the home of his son-in-law, Patrick Clinton, at 14 Dominick Street, Dublin, and is buried in Glasnevin cemetery.

Today, Cogan's reputation rests on his keyboard music, which compares well with that of most of his better-known contemporaries. His music falls into the period of the development from the harpsichord to the piano, and, in time, his compositions fully exploit the sonic and technical possibilities of the grand piano. His best music can be found among his piano sonatas and the piano concerto op. 5 (1790).

== Works ==
Stage

- The Rape of Proserpine, pantomime (Dublin, 7 February 1776)
- The Ruling Passion (Louis McNally) (Dublin, 24 February 1778)
- The Contract (Robert Houlton), with John Andrew Stevenson, Tommaso Giordani, Laurent (Dublin, 14 May 1782)
- The Chace [sic!] on Our Huntresses (London, c.1790)
- In April when Primroses (London, c.1790)
- The Lady and the Gipsy (Dublin, c.1811)

Orchestral

- Concerto for piano and orchestra in C major, Op. 5 in which is introduced the favourite air of "Malbrouk" (1790)

Chamber music

- A Favourite Lesson and Rondo, on the Air of "The Dargle" (1780)
- Six Sonatas, Op. 1 (five of them have an accompaniment for violin) (London, 1782); includes Cogan's Favourite Rondo from Op. 1, No. 1, 2nd movement (Dublin, 1783)
- Six Grand Sonatas, Op. 2, with an acc. for violin (London, 1784)
- Sonata, Op. 11 for violin and piano (London, 1818)

Piano music

- Three Favourite Sonatas, Op. 4 (London, 1787)
- Three Sonatas, Op. 7 (Dublin, 1794–8)
- Three Sonatas, Op. 8 (London, 1799)

Choral

- To God Our Never Failing Strength (81st Psalm) for four voices and piano (published in Melodia sacra, ed. Weyman, Dublin, 1814)

== Modern edition ==
- Evelyn Barry (ed.): Complete Works for Piano Solo by Philip Cogan (= The London Pianoforte School 1766-1860, vol. 8, series ed. Nicholas Temperley (New York, 1984). ISBN 0-8240-6157-8.

== Recording ==
Cogan's music is as yet largely undiscovered by the recording industry. One piece only is available:

- Rondo (from Sonata op. 8 no. 3), performed by Una Hunt (piano), on: Fallen Leaves from an Irish Album, RTÉ lyric fm CD 109 (CD, 2006).

== Bibliography ==
- Ita M. Hogan: Anglo-Irish Music 1780–1830 (Cork: Cork University Press, 1966).
- T. J. Walsh: Opera in Dublin 1705–1797. The Social Scene (Dublin: Allen Figgis, 1973).
- Terry de Valera: "Philip Cogan (1750–1830), Pianist and Composer", in: Dublin Historical Record 39 (1985), pp. 2–12.
- Martin Fahy: Philip Cogan: Piano Concerto in C, op. 5 (MA thesis, NUI Maynooth, 1995), unpublished.
