= Philip Martin (pianist) =

Irish pianist and composer

Philip Martin (born 27 October 1947) is an Irish pianist, composer, and piano pedagogue.
