= Seán Clancy (composer) =

Irish composer (born 1984)

Seán Clancy (born 1984) is an Irish composer and lecturer in Composition at the Royal Birmingham Conservatoire. He has worked with numerous music ensembles and had a residency at the Moog Soundlab in 2015 and 2018.

Clancy has a PhD from Birmingham Conservatoire.
