= Eibhlis Farrell =

Irish composer

Eibhlis Farrell (born 27 July 1953) is a Northern Irish composer.

== Life ==
Eibhlis Farrell was born in Rostrevor in County Down, Northern Ireland. She began writing music at an early age and studied at Queen's University, Belfast, where she graduated with a Bachelor of Music, and with Raymond Warren at Bristol University, graduating with a Masters in composition. She also studied with Charles Wuorinen and Robert Moevs, and graduated from Rutgers University, New Jersey, with a doctorate.

After completing her studies, Farrell worked as a composer and became Head of Music Creative Media at the Dundalk Institute of Technology. Her works have been performed and broadcast internationally. She received the Arts Council of Northern Ireland artist's residency in the Banff Centre, Canada, in 2007. She is a member of Aosdána, and has served as a member of the Toscaireacht.

== Selected works ==
Orchestral

- A Day at the Races (1976)
- Popcorn Overture (1977)
- Threnody (1979)
- Kilbroney Set for traditional Irish instruments and orchestra (1995)

Band

- Fanfare for President Robinson for brass band and timpani (1991)
- Soundshock (1992)
- Fanfare for brass band and timpani (1993)

Concertante

- Romanza for flute and orchestra (1980)
- Concerto Grosso for 2 violins, cello and string orchestra (1988)

Chamber and instrumental music

- Five Trifles for oboe and piano (1976)
- String Quartet No. 2 (1977)
- Elegy for viola and piano (1977)
- Piano Trio (1978)
- Sonatine for clarinet and piano (1978)
- Musings for violin solo (1982)
- Quadralogue for clarinet, English horn, trumpet and bassoon (1982)
- Diversions for flute, violin, cello and harpsichord (1986)
- Procession for flute, English horn, violin and viola (1986)
- Conversation for violin and cello (1988)
- Six Candles on a Birthday Cake for clarinet and piano (1989)
- Quintalogue for 2 trumpets, horn, trombone and tuba (1989)
- Canson for violin and piano (1991)
- Earthshine for harp (1992)
- Orpheus Sings for violin and guitar (1992)
- Arioso for alto saxophone solo (1994)
- Estampie for violin solo (1994)
- Penelope Weaving for viola solo (1994)
- Skyshapes for flute solo (1994)
- Stillsong for cello solo (1994)
- Morning Star for soprano saxophone and organ (2001)
- An Chruit Draíochta for harp (2002)
- Conversation II for violin and cello (2002)
- Earthloops for clarinet solo (2003)
- Orpheus Sings for violin and piano (2005)
- Time and Space Died Yesterday for bass clarinet (2006)
- The Bell of Bronach for violin solo (2009)
- Flightpath North for brass and percussion (2009)

Organ

- Play (1985)
- Study (1985)
- Dancing (1988)

Piano

- Time Drops (1989)
- Four Variations on a Fortieth Birthday (1991)
- Tadhg's Playstation (2007)
- Gleann na Sídhe – The Fairy Glen (2011)

Vocal

- Eleven Celtic Epigrams for mezzo-soprano and orchestra (1976)
- Now is a Moveable Feast' for soprano and chamber ensemble (1979)
- Songs of Death for mezzo-soprano and piano (1980)
- Three Feminist Lovesongs for baritone and piano (1987)
- Windfalls for soprano and chamber ensemble (1990)
- The Lovesong of Isabella and Elias Cairel for mezzo-soprano, oboe, viola and glockenspiel (1992)
- The Silken Bed for mezzo-soprano, violin, cello and piano or harpsichord (1993)
- Fáinne Geal an Lae for 2 sopranos and Irish harp (1995)
- Oft in the Stilly Night for 2 sopranos and piano (1995)
- O Star Illumined by the Sun for soprano and chamber ensemble (1999)
- Maria, Dolce Maria for 2 sopranos and organ (2001)
- Pulchra es amica mea for mezzo-soprano, bass clarinet and harp (2005)
- Tom's Cyber World for soloists and chamber ensemble (2007)
- Ave Maris Stella for soprano and string quartet (2009)
- Winter Sleeps for soprano and piano (2010)

Choral

- Moods for mixed chorus a cappella (1978)
- Christmas Carols (1989–2007)
- A Garland for the President for soprano and mixed chorus a cappella (1990)
- Exaudi Voces for soprano, alto, tenor, baritone, and mixed chorus a cappella (1991)
- Exultet for soprano, tenor, mixed chorus and orchestra (1991)
- The Queen of Connemara for baritone, female chorus, violin and Irish harp (1995)
- The Star of the County Down for baritone, female chorus, violin and Irish harp (1995)
- Thugamar Féin for soprano, female chorus, violin, Irish harp and optional percussion (1995)
- Caritas Abundat for 2 sopranos and mixed chorus a cappella (1995)
- Duo Seraphim for soloists, mixed chorus and orchestra (1997)
- O Rubor Sanguinis for mixed chorus a cappella (1998)
- Setanta for soprano, mixed chorus and orchestra (2000)
- Ave Maria for soprano and female chorus a cappella (2009)
