= Paul McSwiney =

Irish composer

Paul McSwiney or Paul Mac Swiney (March 1856 – 17 November 1889) was an Irish composer and dramatist who emigrated to the United States. A talented artist with a number of pioneering performances in both Cork and New York, he unsuccessfully tried to save the Irish language among the New York Irish.

== Life and work ==
McSwiney was born in Cork and was baptised at St Finbarr's Catholic Church on 6 March 1856. His father, Terence McSwiney, ran a grocery shop at 119 Patrick's Street, and was later a town councillor. He performed as a pianist in amateur circles during his twenties, including at concerts given by the Catholic Young Men's Society, but seems to have written nothing of any substance before the first performance of his opera Amergen in the Cork Opera House on 23 February 1881. A significant event in local music history, the opera to his libretto was praised for its drama and melodic content, but less so for its musical craftsmanship. It is also an important work in the development of Celticist influences in Irish opera and classical music generally.

Soon after the week of performances, McSwiney went to London and in 1883 to New York, where he became the musical director of the New York branch of the Society for the Preservation of the Irish Language. The first work he produced in that capacity was An Bárd 'gus an Fó, subtitled "A Gaelic Idyll", a dramatic cantata for soloists, choir and orchestra, first performed at Steinway Hall on 28 November 1884. However, it was not before the work was produced in an English version as The Bard and the Knight in the following year that the work could attract a larger audience.

Other works to which he contributed both music and words were Alexander, a Musical Drama and the unfinished cantata John McHale. Some of his songs became popular in America.

He also produced a number of plays, such as Brian (1888), Cupid and Crime (1889), The Fairies Doll, and a novel, Nirvana. McSwiney's failure with An Bárd 'gus an Fó is significant for the diminishing importance of the Irish language among the immigrant Irish during the late 19th century.

== Small-scale works ==
- I Mean to Wait for Jack (words by Frank Bainbridge), for voice and piano (New York: C.H. Ditson, 1884), score online at Library of Congress
- The Green Hills of Holy Old Ireland (words by Paul McSwiney), for voice and piano (Boston: Oliver Ditson, 1884), copy in Princess Grace Irish Library (under the aegis of Fondation Princesse Grace), Monaco
