= Charles Thomas Carter =

Irish composer

Charles Thomas Carter (c. 1735 – 12 October 1804) was an Irish composer and organist with mixed success as an opera composer in London, but with some songs that remained popular beyond his lifetime.

== Life ==
There is considerable confusion about the identity and potential family connections of various musicians called Carter in Dublin and London, three of whom abbreviated their name as "T. Carter". The first was Timothy Carter (c. 1715–1772), a Dublin musician who became the father of the present (Charles) Thomas Carter and of Sampson Carter (c.1749–1815). Another Irish-born composer named Thomas Carter (1769–1800) was considerably younger, but died earlier – the London-published music of these two Thomas Carters during the 1790s is difficult to distinguish. (Charles) Thomas often, but not always, abbreviated his name as "C.T. Carter".

According to John O'Keeffe, Thomas was a choirboy in Christ Church Cathedral, Dublin, but there is no other evidence for this. He was organist at St Werburgh's Church, Dublin, from 10 December 1751 to 7 November 1754, when the organ was destroyed by fire. There were benefit concerts on his behalf in Dublin in 1754 and 1756. He was then appointed organist at St Peter's Church, Dublin, between November 1757 and October 1762. After a new organ had been installed at St Werburgh's, he returned there for the period April 1767 to September 1769.

In late 1769, following a London repetition of the Dublin production of Amintas by George Rush (died 1780), to which Carter had written a new overture, he moved to London, obviously attempting to gain a foothold in operatic work, which initially met with little success. In 1787, he became the musical director of the newly built Royalty Theatre, and in 1789 of the private theatre of the Duke of Barrymore at Wargrave. The most successful of his operas was Just in Time, produced in 1792 at Covent Garden. Despite his undoubted talent, Carter died in poverty in London. Squire explained this as "[...] his improvidence and carelessness were such that he was in perpetual difficulties".

== Music ==
Despite his long work as organist, it is surprising that Carter does not seem to have composed more organ music, except for one late publication. As soon as he was in London, Carter showed a remarkable proficiency at vocal music and music for the stage. Of his large-scale works, only the last one, the opera Just in Time enjoyed some success. His overtures were described as "of more than average ability", Fiske (1980) singling out the overture to the pastoral The Birthday (1787) as being "remarkable for an astonishingly modern sequence of chords" and that of Just in Time (1792) as "well above average for its day".

However, Carter excelled as a composer of songs, which were made popular during the fashionable open-air promenades in the Vauxhall Gardens. In particular, the song "Oh Nanny wilt though fly with me" from his first collection of Vauxhall Garden songs (1773) proved an enduring success and was sung and reprinted for many decades.

Carter also wrote some accomplished music for the harpsichord or piano. Fiske (1980) described his Six Sonatas op. 3 as "of especial interest", because of its independent violin part.

== Selected compositions ==
Operas / Stage works

- The Rival Candidates, London, Drury Lane, 1 February 1775
- The Milesian, London, Drury Lane, 20 March 1777
- The Fair American, London, Drury Lane, 18 May 1782
- The Birthday, or Arcadian Contest, London, Royalty Theatre, 3 July 1787
- True Blue, London, Royalty Theatre, 1787 (lost)
- The Constant Maid, or Poll of Plympton, London, Royalty Theatre, 16 January 1788
- Just in Time, London, Covent Garden, 10 May 1792

Songs / Song collections

- A Collection of Favorite Songs Sung at Vaux-Hall, three annual volumes (London, 1773–5). First vol. contains Oh Nanny.
- A Favourite Collection of Songs, two volumes (London, 1777 & 1779)
- Eight English Canzonets (London, c. 1780)

Harpsichord / Piano

- Six Lessons (London, 1770)
- Twelve Familiar Sonatinas, Op. 6 (London, c. 1778)
- Two Favourite Duets and a Sonata (c. 1785)
- c. ten sets of variations on original, popular or traditional themes, incl. Anna (1775), Gramachree Molly, My Lodging is on the Cold Ground

Other instrumental

- in Ireland (before 1769): orchestral concertos for clarinet, bassoon, and violin
- Amintas (1765), overture (orchestra) to revised version of George Rush's (died 1780) operatic afterpiece The Royal Shepherd
- Six Sonatas, Op. 3 (1774) for harpsichord/piano with violin and cello parts
- Fugues and Full Pieces, Op. 37 (potentially misread from 27) (c. 1800), for organ

== Selected recordings ==
- Oh Nanny, performed by Julianne Baird (soprano) and Mary Jane Newman (piano), on: Vox Classics VOX 7537 (CD, 1996).
- Sonatine No. 10 (from Op. 6), performed by Bridget Cunningham (harpsichord), on: Signum Classics SIG CD 478 (CD, 2017).
