= William Michael Rooke =

Irish composer and violinist

William Michael Rooke (29 September 1794 – 14 October 1847) was an Irish violinist and composer.

== Biography ==
Born William Michael O'Rourke in South Great George's Street, Dublin, he was the son of a local tradesman. He studied counterpoint with Philip Cogan and was probably self-taught on the violin. In 1813, he took up music as a profession and anglicised his surname to Rooke. The young Michael William Balfe was among his pupils on the violin (between 1815 and 1817).

While chorus master and deputy leader of the orchestra at Crow Street Theatre between 1817 and 1823, Rooke composed his first opera Amilie, or the Love Test, which, however, was not performed until 1837 (at Covent Garden Theatre, London). Balfe himself sang in the opera at an 1838 performance in Dublin.

In 1821, he moved to England and had his musical play The Pirate performed at the Drury Lane Theatre, London, in January 1822. He performed in Birmingham in 1826 and in London, where he was chorusmaster at Drury Lane under Thomas Simpson Cooke (from 1826) led the orchestra at the Vauxhall Gardens concerts (1830–1833) under Henry Bishop. Rooke's opera Henrique (1839), although favourably received, was withdrawn, possibly following arguments with William Macready, the manager, and his further works Cagliostro and The Valkyrie remained unperformed. Besides operas, Rooke also composed a number of songs.

Rooke died at Fulham and was buried in Brompton Cemetery.

== Selected works ==
Stage

- Amilie, or The Love Test, opera, libretto: John Thomas Haines (1818), London, Covent Garden, 1837
- The Pirate, musical play, libretto: William Dimond, after W. Scott, London, Drury Lane, 1822
- Henrique, or The Love Pilgrim, opera, libretto: J. T. Haines, London, Covent Garden, 1839
- Cagliostro, opera (unperformed)
- The Valkyrie, opera (unperformed)

Instrumental music

- Polonaise, for violin
- some piano music

Songs for voice and piano

- The Moment of Victory (E. Knight) (c.1823)
- Let Us Teach the Heart to Love (E. Knight) (c.1825)
- Under the Tree (J. T. Haines) (c.1840)
- Fair One, Take This Rose
- Little Cupid Once Tapped at a Maiden's Heart
- Hark! the Echo
- Oh! Never Shall These Lips Impart. A ballad (J. Lynch)

== Bibliography ==
- William Toynbee (ed.): The Diaries of William Charles Macready (London: Chapman & Hall, 1912).
- Ita M. Hogan: Anglo-Irish Music 1780–1830 (Cork: Cork University Press, 1966).
- Paul Collins: "Rooke, William Michael", in: The Encyclopaedia of Music in Ireland, ed. H. White & B. Boydell (Dublin: UCD Press, 2013), p. 889–90.
