= Thomas Augustine Geary =

Irish composer

Thomas Augustine Geary (Timothy Geary) (1775 – November 1801) was an Irish composer, pianist and organist, with a precocious talent particularly in vocal and piano writing.

== Biography ==
Geary's original first name was Timothy; it is presumed that he chose "Thomas Augustine" as artist's names in admiration for Thomas Augustine Arne. He was a choirboy and choral scholar at St. Patrick's Cathedral, Dublin, where he occasionally assisted the cathedral organist, Philip Cogan. In 1792, he performed a concerto by Dussek at a charity concert at the Rotunda, Dublin, at which one of his canzonets, Soft is the Zephyr's Breezy Wing, was also performed. According to W.H.G. Flood, Geary studied at Trinity College, Dublin, but there is no evidence for this claim. According to an 1818 source, "labouring under some depression of mind he rushed out of the house, and was found drowned in the canal". In Brian Boydell's opinion, "his premature death undoubtedly robbed Irish music of a sensitive and promising talent".

== Music ==
Geary was the first Irish composer to systematically explore the form of popular airs or folktunes with variations, which were very much in demand at his time. He also excelled in vocal writing, impressing with remarkable maturity and sensitivity in word-setting and excellent piano accompaniments. Many of his songs and piano pieces were reprinted in London and the United States for decades after his early death.

== Selected compositions ==
Vocal (for voice and piano/harpsichord, if not otherwise mentioned)

- The Forecastle-Sailor of the Guardian Frigate, Dublin: Hime (c.1790)
- Ten Canzonets (partly duets), Dublin: Edmund Lee (c.1790)
- Six Canzonetts (partly duets; texts 1–5 from The Festival of Comus, London c.1780; text 6 by Thomas Moss), London: J. Bland (c.1795). Contains: The Silver Rain; Beauty Blooms on Ev'ry Thorn; Come, Gentle Zephyr; As t'Other Day; Go, Gentle Zephyr; Pity the Sorrows.
- Geordie Jenkin (anon.), Dublin: McDonnell (c.1795)
- Old Towler (c.1795), quartet
- Leven Water, a Scots Ballad, Dublin: B. Cooke (c.1795)
- The Bonny Sailor, a Favourite New Scots Song. Dublin: Hime (c.1798)
- The Bonny Sailor (c.1800), with flute or guitar
- The Thatch'd Cottage, a Favourite Pastoral, with flute or guitar, Dublin: Goughs (1800)
- Free and Easy (anonymous), Dublin: Francis Rhames (c.1800)
- Soft is the Zephyr's Breezy Wing (anon.), duet, Dublin: Hime (c.1800)
- Listen to the Voice of Love (J. Hook), glee for 4 voices, Dublin: McDonnell (1802)
- The Glasses Sparkle on the Board (W.D. Diggs), London: Goulding, Phipps & D'Almaine (1802)
- Winsan Willy, an Admired Scots Ballad, Dublin: McDonnell (1802)
- Henry to Laura (George Richard Walker), Dublin: Francis Rhames (c.1808)
- Where Liffey Stream Meand'ring Flows, a Favourite Cantatina, Dublin: McDonnell (c.1810)
- With Humble Pleasure, Lord (in Melodia sacra, Dublin 1814), mixed chorus

Piano or harpsichord

- Dicky Gossip [after Storace] arranged as a rondo, Dublin: B. Cooke (c.1795)
- Amoret and Phillida, variations, Dublin: Hime (c.1795)
- Norah Creena, Irish air arranged as a rondo, incl. flute or violin, London: Goulding, Phipps & D'Almaine (c.1798)
- Henry's Cottage Maid [after Pleyel], Dublin: John Lee (c.1798), also Hime (c.1798)
- Kiss Me Lady, favourite air with variations, incl. violin part Dublin: McDonnell (c.1798)
- Variations on O Dear What Can the Matter Be?, Dublin: Hime (c.1800)
- The Greenwich Pensioner [after Dibdin], Dublin: Hime (c.1800)
- See Brother See, the Favourite Bird Song in the Opera of "Children in the Wood" [after Arnold], Dublin: Hime (c.1800)
- Grand March in Blue Beard [after Kelly], with variations, Dublin: Hime (c.1800)
- Aileen Aroon, air and variations (c.1800)
- A New Ground with 24 Airs, Dublin: Francis Rhames (c.1808)
- Col. Doyle's March, Dublin: B. Cooke (n.d.)
- Duke of Bedford's March and Quickstep, with flute, Dublin: W. Power (n.d.)

== Recordings ==
So far only one composition by Geary has been recorded on a commercial CD:

- Aileen Aroon, air and variations, performed by Una Hunt, on: RTÉ lyric fm CD 109 (CD, 2006).

== Bibliography ==
- Ita M. Hogan: Anglo-Irish Music 1780–1830 (Cork: Cork University Press, 1966)
- Ita Beausang: "Geary, Thomas Augustine [Timothy]", in: The Encyclopaedia of Music in Ireland, ed. by Harry White & Barra Boydell (Dublin: UCD Press, 2013), p. 424–425.
- entries in New Grove Dictionary of Music and Musicians (2001) and Die Musik in Geschichte und Gegenwart (MGG) (vol. 7, 2002)
