= George William Torrance =

Irish composer and organist

Rev. George William Torrance
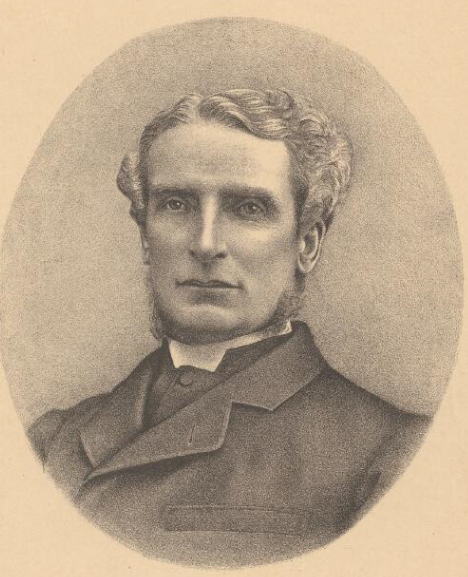
- George Torrance Mus. Doc.

Background information
- Born: 25 June 1835; Rathmines, Dublin, Ireland
- Died: 27 August 1907 (aged 72)
- Occupations: Composer, Conductor, Minister
- Years active: 1869-1898

George William Torrance (25 July 1835 – 20 August 1907) was an Irish composer, mainly of church music, who was resident in Australia for many years.

== Early life ==
Torrance was born in Rathmines, Dublin, and became a choirboy at Christ Church Cathedral (1847–1851). Before reaching the age of 20, he had already worked as a parish organist in the Dublin area and composed his first oratorio Abraham (1855). He continued his musical education in Leipzig, Germany (1856–1857), before beginning his studies at Trinity College, Dublin, where he graduated B.A. in 1864, M.A. in 1867, and later (by examination only) MusB and MusD (1879).

Before his decision to become a clergyman, he tried his hand at a number of secular compositions including the opera William of Normandy (1858) and a number of songs. He was ordained by the Bishop of Lichfield in 1865 for the curacy of St Mary's Church, Shrewsbury, and remained there till 1867, when he became curate of St. Ann's, Dublin.

== Australia, 1869–1898 ==
Torrance went to Victoria (Australia) in December 1869, and in the following February accepted the curacy of Christ Church, South Yarra, being from 1871 to 1876 in charge of St. John's, Melbourne. He was appointed Acting Head of Trinity College (University of Melbourne) on the opening of that institution in 1872, but resigned on his nomination to the incumbency of All Saints', Geelong, in 1877. In January of the next year he was appointed to the incumbency at Holy Trinity, Balaclava. After receiving his 1879 musical degrees from Trinity College Dublin he was also admitted Mus. Doc. ad eundem by the University of Melbourne.

At the Social Science Congress in 1880, Torrance was elected President of the Fine Arts section and delivered the opening address. In addition to his ministerial work he has given much time and attention to music. He collaborated with Alfred William Howitt in the transcription of three songs performed by William Barak, the last traditional ngurungaeta (elder) of the Wurundjeri-willam clan. Among other works, he produced the oratorio The Revelation (1882), which was performed at the Melbourne Town Hall under his direction.

In 1883, Torrance was appointed one of the examiners for the Clarke Scholarship at the Royal College of Music, London, and by the Commissioners of the Centennial Exhibition (1880) one of the judges in the competition for the opening cantata. In 1886, he visited Europe and was present, with his protégé, Ernest Hutcheson, a rising young Australian musician, at the famous Wagner Festival at Bayreuth. He returned to Victoria in the following year. Torrance was married in 1872 to the eldest surviving daughter of S. B. Vaughan, solicitor, of Melbourne.

== Return to Ireland ==
Torrance and his wife settled back in Ireland in 1898, he was appointed chaplain to the bishop of Ossory and a bishop's vicar choral at St Canice's Cathedral, Kilkenny. In the following year, his 1882 oratorio The Revelation received another performance in London, and he resumed his compositional activity, producing several church services and other vocal music. In 1900, he was appointed a canon. Torrance died in Kilkenny, Ireland, on 20 August 1907.

In Johnstone's assessment, "After Robert Prescott Stewart, Torrance was arguably the most accomplished Irish church musician of his generation".

== Recognition ==
A memorial tablet to Torrance by J. R. Tranthim-Fryer was unveiled at Trinity College, Melbourne in June 1908.

== Selected compositions ==
Opera

- William of Normandy (William Henry Craig), 2 acts (Dublin, 1858)

Oratorios

- Abraham (William Henry Craig) (1855)
- The Captivity (after Oliver Goldsmith), 1864
- The Revelation, or Vision of St. John in the Isle of Patmos (bibl.), 1882

Church music

- Festival Service, Cantate Domino, Deus misereatur (1881)
- And the Lord Said (1888) and other anthems (publ. London & New York, 1881–1902)
- Magnificat and nunc dimittis in A major (1889)
- Magnificat and nunc dimittis in F major (1906)
- Magnificat and nunc dimittis in D major (1906)
- Sacred Songs (ed., works by Handel and Mendelssohn) for voice and piano (Melbourne, 1885)

Other vocal music

- My Native Land (S.L. Elrington), song (1857)
- The Bride ("L.C.L."), song (1857)
- Songs of Faith and Hope (1889), for voice and piano with obligato flute, violin, cello
- A Welcome to the Queen in Ireland (J. Vance), song (1901)
- Dry be that Tear (Richard Brinsley Sheridan), partsong (1904)
- A Dream within a Dream (Edgar Allan Poe), partsong (1904)
- The Land Beyond the Sea
- A Matin Song

== Bibliography ==
- Evans, Robert; Humphreys, Maggie, eds. (1997). Dictionary of Composers for the Church in Great Britain and Ireland. Bloomsbury. ISBN 978-1-4411-3796-8.
- Farran, E.A.C. (1968). "Dr G.W. Torrance". Victorian Historical Magazine. 39.
- Howitt, Alfred William (1904). The Native Tribes of South East Australia. London: Macmillan.
- Johnstone, Andrew (2013). "Torrance, George William". In White, H.; Boydell, B. (eds.). Encyclopaedia of Music in Ireland. Dublin: UCD Press.
- Stevens, Robin S. (1976). "Torrance, George William (1835–1907)". Australian Dictionary of Biography. National Centre of Biography, Australian National University. ISBN 978-0-522-84459-7. ISSN 1833-7538. OCLC 70677943.
