= Rhoda Coghill =

Irish composer and poet

Rhoda Sinclair Coghill
- Born: 14 October 1903; Dublin, Ireland
- Died: 9 February 2000 (aged 96); Dublin, Ireland
- Occupations: Pianist, composer and poet

Rhoda Sinclair Coghill (14 October 1903 – 9 February 2000) was an Irish pianist, composer and poet.

== Biography ==
Rhoda Coghill was born in Dublin and studied from the age of eight with Patricia Read at the Leinster School of Music. Between 1913 and 1925 she won 21 prizes at the Feis Ceoil (Irish music competition), among them first prizes for piano solo, piano accompaniment and piano duet, after 1923 for composition. In that year she completed her largest score, the rhapsody Out of the Cradle Endlessly Rocking for tenor solo, mixed chorus and orchestra, to a text by Walt Whitman. Coghill also played double bass in the orchestras of the Dublin Philharmonic Society and Radio Éireann. She continued her piano studies with Artur Schnabel in Berlin (1927–8) to whom she had been recommended by Fritz Brase. In 1939 she took a position as the accompanist of Radio Éireann, where she remained until 1969. In this capacity she has worked with major performers of her day, both Irish and international, and gave exemplary interpretations of contemporary Irish works. She was known for remarkable sight-reading capacities and her absolute ear. She also appeared as a concerto soloist, reliably attracting large audiences.

Coghill stopped composing in the early 1940s, concentrating on her performing career, but began writing and translating poetry (three publications between 1948 and 1958). It has been suggested that a reason for this re-orientation may have been that in the poetry and literature-dominated perception of Irish culture it was easier to receive acknowledgements as a poet rather than as a composer.

Coghill remained unmarried and spent her late years from 1982 at Westfield House, Morehampton Road, Dublin, where she died aged 96. Her music manuscripts as well as some notebooks and diaries are located in Trinity College, Dublin (MS 11111).

== Music ==
The rhapsody Out of the Cradle Endlessly Rocking is one of the most forward-looking Irish compositions in the first half of the twentieth century. Written during the Civil War in Ireland in 1923, it was first performed in a small format, with a small orchestra and a vocal quartet replacing the chorus, in the 1950s; the first performance did not take place before 1990. Up to this time, Coghill had never heard an orchestra, but had a good knowledge of orchestral music from studying scores. The work is set for tenor solo, mixed chorus and orchestra, is in one continuous movement of about 23 to 25 minutes duration. The text is based on a poem of the same title by Walt Whitman. The work is remarkable for its unconventional tenor line (resembling the irregular metre of the poetry), the use of whole-tone scales, and its overall serious expression and emotional drama. One of the reasons why she didn't write more orchestral music or why she didn't promote the score for so long may also lie in her modesty as a practising Quaker.

Her songs show a sensitive and skilled hand in setting words, be it in folksong arrangements or in original compositions. Some are quite distinct, showing a somewhat introspective, atmospheric voice. Her only published piano composition, the Gaelic Phantasy (1939), plays with elements of Irish traditional music in an original manner. For the print with An Gúm (Irish government publisher) she was forced to smooth out some chromatic harmonies that she had originally intended.

Renewed interest in music of neglected female Irish composers has led to some of Coghill's songs being performed. "Mary Moriarty" (1925) was performed at "Ina Boyle and her World" as part of Music in Calary Summer Series in June 2024 by baritone David Scott and pianist Aileen Cahill and "Jenny Kissed Me," "Parting" (1940), "When" (1940) and "Among the Heather" (1926) were performed by tenor Stephen Walker at a recital of "Irish Melodies" as part of the Blackwater Valley Opera Festival 2024.

== Selected compositions ==
Works with orchestra

- Out of the Cradle, Endlessly Rocking (Walt Whitman), rhapsody for tenor solo, chorus and orchestra (1923)
- Gaelic Phantasy. Arrangement of piano work (c.1935) for piano and orchestra (1972)

Songs (for voice and piano)

- A Song of St. Francis (A. Neville Maugham) (1921)
- I Love All Beauteous Things (Robert Bridges) (1924)
- I Will not Let Thee Go (Robert Bridges) (1924)
- Mary Moriarty (Winifred M. Letts) (1925)
- Jenny (Leigh Hunt) (1925)
- Creeveen Cno (A Little Cluster of Nuts) (Patrick Joseph McCall) (1924), Dublin: Pigott & Co., 1925.
- Messages (Francis Thompson) (1925)
- Among the Heather. Old Irish Air arr. (William Allingham) (1926), Dublin: Pigott & Co., 1926.
- Peasant Woman's Song (Dion Boucicault) (1926)
- Five Poems by Pádraic Colum (set to Irish traditional melodies) (1923–26). Contains: In the Fore of the Year, Once I Loved a Maiden fair, The Hawk-Questing Maid, The Old Woman of the Roads, I'll Bring You These for Dowry.
- Meg Merrilees (John Keats) (1927)
- Erster Schnee (Otto Siepmann, transl. by Coghill) (1931)
- Four Poems by Æ (George Russell) (1941). Contains: Refuge, Parting, When, Germinal.
- The Might of Love (We Live in Hope of Seeing) (A.J. Hilty, transl. by Coghill) for unison mixed voices and piano (n.d.), published in Quaker Song Book, ed. by John Sheldon (London: Stainer & Bell, 1981), ISBN 0852494815.

Piano music

- Four Piano Pieces for Children (When Childher Plays) (1926).
- Gaelic Phantasy (c.1935), published as Saoirdhréacht Gaedhealach do’n Phiano (Dublin: An Gúm, 1942).

== Recording ==
- Gaelic Phantasy, performed by Deborah Grimmett: New Classics Records NC01 (CD & downloads, 2021).

== Poetry ==
Coghill's poetry "reflect a sensitivity to nature, a belief in simplicity and a deep Christian faith. Although stylistically advanced, she made occasional use of various rhyme techniques." In the introduction to her first collection (1948), Seumas O'Sullivan wrote that Coghill's expressiveness would "eventually give their author full title to a place amongst the poets of our time". She was represented in the first Field Day anthology of Irish women writers (2002).

- The Bright Hillside (Dublin: Hodges, Figgis & Co., 1948)
- Time is a Squirrell (Dublin: The Dolmen Press, 1956)
- Angel Songs/Engellieder. Translated by Rhoda Coghill from the German of Rainer Maria Rilke (Dublin: The Dolmen Press, 1958)

== Bibliography ==
- Axel Klein: Die Musik Irlands im 20. Jahrhundert (Hildesheim: Georg Olms, 1996), ISBN 3-487-10196-3.
- Richard Pine: Music and Broadcasting in Ireland (Dublin: Four Courts Press, 2005), ISBN 1-85182-842-7 (hardback), ISBN 1-85182-843-5 (paperback).
- Laura Watson: "Epitaph for a Musician: Rhoda Coghill as Pianist, Composer and Poet", in Journal of the Society for Musicology in Ireland, 11 (2015–16), pp. 3–23; http://eprints.maynoothuniversity.ie/7652/.
