= John William Glover =

Irish composer and conductor

John William Glover (19 June 1815 – 19 December 1899) was an Irish composer, conductor, organist, violinist, and teacher.

== Life and music ==
Glover was born in Dublin, where he initially became an orchestral violinist as early as 1830. In 1848, he succeeded Haydn Corri as organist of St. Mary's Pro-Cathedral, Dublin, and also became professor of music at the Central Model Schools of the Board of National Education. An experienced choral conductor, he established the short-lived Choral Institute of Dublin in 1851. He presented a series of "National Concerts" in 1853 to commemorate Thomas Moore one year after the poet's death, and also co-organised and conducted large musical performances on the occasion of the centenaries of Daniel O'Connell (1875) and Thomas Moore (1879).

As a composer, Glover was one of a handful of native composers who cultivated (classical) musical life in Dublin in the mid-19th century – and among these the only one of Roman Catholic denomination. A personal friend of the émigrés Michael William Balfe and William Vincent Wallace, he, too, was inclined towards opera, despite the incomparably more difficult circumstances in Ireland in this period. His most ambitious work was the three-act opera The Deserted Village (libretto by Edmund Falconer after Oliver Goldsmith's novel of the same name), performed in Dublin in 1880 and published in London. In it, "Glover uses a very direct diatonic language that is not sentimental but speaks to his assured facility for setting words to music", it was also described as a "populist style". To a very limited extent he makes use of Irish traditional music, but even so it is an important work in the canon of Irish national opera. Other large-scale works include the "national oratorio" St Patrick at Tara (1875), written for the O'Connell Centenary, and the cantata One Hundred Years Ago (1879) for the Moore Centenary. He also wrote a violin concerto (date unknown)

Glover was also an expert on Irish traditional music. He lectured widely on this subject in Dublin, London, and Paris. Among his publications is one of the earliest collective volumes of Thomas Moore's Irish Melodies (to Glover's accompaniments, 1859), and he collaborated with Patrick Weston Joyce, providing the piano accompaniments to his Ancient Irish Music (1873). Glover died in Dublin.

He was the grandfather of Jimmy Glover, director of music at the Theatre Royal, Drury Lane, from 1893 to 1920.

== Selected works ==
=== Stage ===
- St. Patrick at Tara (Dublin, 1875), cantata
- One Hundred Years Ago. Ode to Thomas Moore (1879), cantata
- The Deserted Village (libretto: Edmund Falconer, after Oliver Goldsmith), opera in 3 acts (London: Duncan Davison & Co., 1880)

=== Sacred music ===
- First Mass for Four Voices, for 1st and 2nd trebles, tenor, bass, organ (London: Richard Butler, c.1860)
- Ave Maria (Duetto-coro) (London, 1864)
- Salve Sancta Parens (Hymn of the Blessed Virgin) (London, 1864)
- O Jesu bone Pastor (Offertorium) (London, 1865)
- Responses at High Mass (London, 1865)
- Have Mercy Upon Me O Lord (Sacred song) (London, 1866)
- Ecce Sacerdos Magnus (Motet) (London, 1867)
- O Salutaris Hostia (Solo & quartett) (London, 1868)
- Sixth Mass for Four Voices (London, 1872)

=== Piano music ===
- Brilliant Fantasia on Airs from Donizetti's Opera Don Pasquale (London: B. Williams, 1860)
- Galop di Bravura on a Favorite Air by Auber, as a Fantasia (London, 1865)
- A Planxtae, "National Irish dance tune … founded upon an ancient Irish melody" (London: Duncan Davison & Co., 1870)
- La Bella Sorrentina, "Romanza Napolitaine" (London, 1870)
- The Cruiskeen Lawn, "descriptive fantasia" (London, 1870)
- The Skedaddle Galop (London, 1873)
- Brilliant Fantasia … on the celebrated Irish melodies … (London: Edwin Ashdown, c.1891)

=== Organ music ===
- Professor Glover's Organ Book (London, 1870)
- Voluntaries for the Organ (1892)

=== Songs ===
- Old Erin's Lovely Girls (T. A. Ogle) (London, 1864)
- The Heart that Loves Me Dearest (T. A. Ogle) (London, 1864)

=== Folk-song arrangements ===
- Thomas Moore's Irish Melodies (Dublin: James Duffy, 1859)
- Ancient Irish Music, collected by Patrick Weston Joyce (Dublin: McGlashan & Gill, 1873)

== Bibliography ==
In addition to the works cited in the References below, of interest may also be:

- Ita Beausang: "From National Sentiment to Nationalist Movement, 1850–1900", in: Music in Nineteenth-Century Ireland (Irish Musical Studies vol. 9), ed. M. Murphy & J. Smaczny (Dublin: Four Courts Press, 2007), p. 36–51.
