= Arthur Duff (composer) =

Irish composer

Arthur Knox Duff (13 March 1899 – 23 September 1956) was an Irish composer and conductor, best known for his short orchestral pieces such as the Handel-inspired Echoes of Georgian Dublin. His career also encompassed senior positions in the Irish Army School of Music and in the music department of Radio Éireann.

== Early years and education ==
Duff was born in Dublin to John William Duff, a native of King's County (now County Offaly), and his wife Annie Kathleen Hickey. Duff was a chorister in Christ Church Cathedral, Dublin and studied at the Royal Irish Academy of Music under Charles Herbert Kitson. He completed his education at Trinity College Dublin where he obtained his primary degree in arts and music. In 1942, he was awarded a doctorate in music following an examination. Duff was initially drawn to the ministry of the Church of Ireland but abandoned his religious studies before the final examination.

== Career ==
Duff had a varied career in music as a solo performer, conductor, arranger, producer, and composer. He later became an author and playwright, although he remained most famous for his music.

He first came to public prominence in his early twenties for his organ recitals in St. Matthias' Church in Dublin.

In 1923 Duff joined the Irish Army and was commissioned as a second lieutenant. He was promoted to lieutenant in 1926. He served as bandmaster in the Army School of Music and conductor of Army no. 2 Band based in Cork. Following his resignation from the army in 1931 Duff turned to the theatre, writing incidental music for a number of plays produced in the Abbey Theatre, including works by W. B. Yeats and Denis Johnston. His own play, Cadenza in Black, was produced at the Gate Theatre in 1937.

In 1937 Duff joined Radio Éireann as the station's first music producer and went on to become assistant director of music in 1945. Working for the national broadcaster gave him the opportunity to conduct the Radio Éireann Symphony Orchestra in music by his friends, Arnold Bax and E.J. Moeran.

== Personal life ==
While serving in the Irish army, Duff met Frances Ferris, daughter of the United States Consul General in Ireland. They were married on 6 November 1929 and a daughter, Sylvia, was born to the couple in October 1930. However, Duff and his wife separated in December 1931 and Frances and Sylivia moved permanently to the United States.

Arthur Duff died in Dublin at the age of 57 and is buried in Mount Jerome cemetery.

== Compositions ==
Arthur Duff was not interested in making grand statements in his music but preferred to explore what he termed "the laneways and the miniature". The lack of a strong classical music tradition in Ireland led him, like many of his Irish contemporaries, to seek guidance from the great names in English music. The influence of Peter Warlock and Frederick Delius, for instance, can be heard in his small output of orchestral compositions.

Duff started off writing for the human voice. One of his earliest works was a song called Aftermath performed at a recital given in Dublin on 16 October 1924 by a baritone, Jean Bertin. Duff accompanied on the piano. Among his early choral compositions was My Beloved Spake, a short piece performed in Dublin in 1935.

Duff's five-movement Irish Suite for Strings won praise for its "haunting melodies" following its première given by the Dublin String Orchestra in November 1940. It proved to be a popular choice in subsequent orchestral concerts, appearing again less than a year later in a programme that included Duff's score for the 1933 ballet, The Drinking Horn. John Barbirolli also conducted the suite when The Hallé Orchestra performed in Dublin in September 1947. The string orchestra continued to be Duff's chosen medium for his next two works, Meath Pastoral and Twilight in Templeogue, dedicated to Irish writers, Brinsley MacNamara and Austin Clarke respectively. Both pieces were premiered at the same concert in April 1945.

Duff's final orchestral composition, Echoes of Georgian Dublin, is made up of five short movements, each based on the work of a composer living in Dublin during the eighteenth century. It was first performed by the Radio Éireann Symphony Orchestra in January 1956, eight months before Duff's death.

In his Irish Times obituary, Duff as a composer was described as one whose "reticence and independence, reinforced by an obstinate nostalgia, left him indifferent to, and aloof from, the demands and conventions of his age".

== Selected compositions ==
Ballet music

- The Drinking-Horn (1933)

Incidental music to plays at the Abbey Theatre

- The King of the Great Clock Tower (W. B. Yeats) (1934)
- Resurrection (W. B. Yeats) (1934)
- A Bride for the Unicorn (Denis Johnston) (1935)
- A Deuce O' Jacks (Frederick Robert Higgins) (1935)
- The Duchess of Malfi (after John Webster) (1937)
- The Death of Cuchulain (W. B. Yeats) (1938)
- The Golden Cuckoo (Denis Johnston) (1939)
- Where Stars Walk (Micheál Mac Liammóir) (1940)
- Assembly at Druim Ceat (Roibeárd Ó Faracháin)(1943)
- The Only Jealousy of Emer (W. B. Yeats) (1948)
- A Full Moon in March (W. B. Yeats) (n.d.)
- The Plot Is Ready (Austin Clarke) (1955)

Orchestral

- Irish Suite for Strings (1940)
- Meath Pastoral (1940)
- Music for Strings (1941; rev. 1955)
- The Drinking-Horn Suite (1953)
- Echoes of Georgian Dublin (1955)

== Recordings ==
- Romantic Ireland, RTÉ Sinfonietta/Proinnsias O Duinn (features Echoes of Georgian Dublin), Marco Polo 8.223804 (1996)
- Silver Apples of the Moon, Irish Chamber Orchestra/Fionnuala Hunt (features Meath Pastoral and Irish Suite for Strings), Black Box Classics 1003 (1997)

== Bibliography ==
- Katherine S. Walker: "The Festival and the Abbey: Ninette de Valois's Early Choreography, 1925–34, Part II", in: Dance Chronicle 8 (1985), pp. 51–100.
- Axel Klein: Die Musik Irlands im 20. Jahrhundert (Hildesheim: Georg Olms Verlag, 1996).
- Evin O'Meara: A Gentle Musician: Dr Arthur Duff (1899–1956) (BMusEd, Trinity College Dublin, 1999).
