= Anthony Byrne (pianist) =

Irish musician (born 1958)

- Born: 30 July 1958 (age 67); Dublin, Ireland

Anthony Byrne (born 30 July 1958) is an Irish pianist.

== Early life and education ==
Byrne was born in Dublin, Ireland. He studied with Marie Jones and John O'Conor.

In 1980 he studied in the University of Western Ontario, Canada with the British pianist Peter Katin. In 1981 and 1982 he studied in New York with Adele Marcus whilst also studying conducting with Vincent La Selva at the Juilliard School. Byrne's final studies were with Alexander Kelly in London, England.

== Career ==
Byrne has given many recitals and broadcasts both RTÉ and the BBC including his Dublin debut, National Concert Hall 1985, London debut, Purcell Room 1986 and Wigmore Hall 1989. He has performed extensively with the RTÉ National Symphony Orchestra and RTÉ Concert Orchestra including the Irish premiere of Leroy Anderson's Piano Concerto in 1997. He has also performed in the US, Canada and Japan. As a Chamber musician, he has worked with many of Ireland's leading musicians and singers. He performed the complete sonatas for piano and violin by Beethoven with Alan Smale, the leader of the RTÉ National Symphony Orchestra.

== Contemporary music ==
Byrne most important work has been in the promotion and performing of Irish contemporary piano music. He has performed and broadcast more than 50 works including 17 first performances.

Irish works performed:

First performances marked (1st)

Elain Agnew:

Seagull (1st)

Gerald Barry:

Piano Quartet No. 2

Brian Beckett:

Fastasy Variations

Seóirse Bodley:

Aislingí
The Tightrope Walker Presents a Rose

Brian Boydell:

Sarabande
Sleeping Leprechaun
Dance

John Buckley:

Three Preludes
The Cloths of Heaven (written for Anthony Byrne) (1st)
Like Ghosts from an Enchanter Fleeing (written for Anthony Byrne) (1st)
Jim Singing;
And wake the purple year
Three Lullabies for Deirdre
The silver apples of the moon, The golden apples of the sun
Winter Music (commissioned by Anthony Byrne) (1st)
Oileáin
Toccata (written for Anthony Byrne) (1st) A Thin Halo of Blue (1st)

Rhona Clarke:

Gleann Da Lough (written for Anthony Byrne) (1st)
Béal Dearg (commissioned by Anthony Byrne) (1st)
Piano Trio No. 2

Jerome de Bromhead:

Three Fresh Pieces (commissioned by Anthony Byrne) (1st)

Raymond Deane:

Linos 1 and 2
Quaternion for Piano, Celeste and Orchestra (1st)
Compact for Piano and Orchestra (1st)

Benjamin Dwyer:

Three Pieces for Piano (commissioned by Anthony Byrne) (1st)
Tiento

Hormoz Farhat (Persian composer living in Ireland):

4 Etudes

John Gibson

Nocturne 1977
Moladh go Deo le Dia

Fergus Johnston:

Three piano pieces

John Kinsella:

Sonata no 1
Reflection no 2
Reflection no 3

Eibhlis Farrell:

Time Drops

Philip Flood:

December Preludes

Bernard Geary:

Scherzo (written for Anthony Byrne)
Two Cameos (1st)
And lastly came cold February (1st)
Sonatina (1st)
Prelude and Interlude
Two Poems for Violin and Piano

Marion Ingoldsby:

Undulations 2

Philip Martin:

Soundings (commissioned by Anthony Byrne) (1st)

Colman Pearce:

Prelude and Ludus (written for Anthony Byrne) (1st)
Toccata Festiva (written for Anthony Byrne) (1st)

Eric Sweeney:

5 inventions

James Wilson:

Five Preludes (1st)
Ostinato (written for Anthony Byrne)

== Recordings ==
- John Buckley: The complete piano music; Naxos Marco Polo 8.223784 issued 1999
- Bernard Geary: Piano and Choral music; SDGCD 610 issued 2000
- Raymond Deane: Orchestral Works; Naxos Marco Polo 8.225106 issued 1999
- Arthur O'Leary: Piano Music from a Victorian Age; GDD001 issued 2002

== Recognition ==
Byrne is an Associate of the Royal College of Music, London and in 1993 was honoured in Japan with the Ishibashi Zogoro Memorial Scholarship for his work in Contemporary Irish Music. He has also been listed in the Encyclopedia of Ireland 2003 and Who's Who in Ireland 2006.

== Teaching ==
Byrne has been a Senior Lecturer in Piano at the Royal Irish Academy of Music since 1991.
