= John Buckley (composer) =

Irish composer (born 1951)

- Born: 19 December 1951 (age 74); Templeglantine, County Limerick, Ireland
- Genres: Classical, Irish traditional music
- Occupations: Composer, pedagogue, lecturer
- Instruments: Button accordion, flute
- Years active: 1982–present

John Buckley (born 19 December 1951) is an Irish composer and pedagogue, a co-founder of the Ennis Summer School and a member of Aosdána.

== Biography ==
John Buckley was born in Templeglantine, County Limerick. He grew up in a rural environment and was introduced to traditional music, learning the button accordion from local player Liam Moloney, when he was 9 years of age.

In 1969, he moved to Dublin to study for the Teacher's Diploma at St Patrick's College, Drumcondra. Here he had his first opportunity to hear live classical and modern music including contemporary and avantgarde works by Irish composers including Aloys Fleischmann, Brian Boydell, John Kinsella, and Seóirse Bodley, as well as works by international composers such as Krzysztof Penderecki.

He became a student at the Royal Irish Academy of Music, Dublin (1969–74), studying the flute with Doris Keogh and composition with A.J. Potter and James Wilson. He continued his musical studies with Alun Hoddinott in Cardiff, Wales (1978–82), Aloys Fleischmann in Cork (M.A. in composition, 1980), and briefly with John Cage during a summer school for composers and choreographers at Guildford, Surrey, in 1981.

Initially working as a secondary school teacher, from 1982 he was able to work independently as a composer. In 1983, Buckley was the co-founder, with James Wilson, of the annual Ennis Summer School for composition, which became an influential training ground for aspiring young Irish composers; pupils included Michael Alcorn, Rhona Clarke, and Gráinne Mulvey. He became a member of Aosdána, Ireland's state-sponsored academy of creative artists, in 1984. Since 2001 he has been a lecturer in music at St. Patrick's College, Drumcondra.

From the National University of Ireland at Maynooth (now 'Maynooth University') he received a PhD in 2002 and a DMus in 2007.

Apart from membership in Aosdána, Buckley was honoured with the Varming Prize (1976), the Macaulay Fellowship (1978), the Arts Council's Composers' Bursary (1982) and the Marten Toonder Award (1991).

== Music ==
John Buckley's output includes many commissions for solo instruments, chamber ensembles, choirs, bands and orchestras. His music has been widely performed and broadcast in Ireland and in more than fifty countries worldwide. He has represented Ireland at the Unesco International Rostrum of Composers on five occasions and at the 1990 Prix Italia. His music has also been performed at five ISCM festivals.

Buckley's music does not adhere to any particular compositional school. He acknowledges the influence of Luciano Berio, Witold Lutoslawski, György Ligeti, and Olivier Messiaen. His harmonic approach is freely atonal; structurally, there is frequently a gradual build-up from initially very limited pitch material to large formal constructions. Many compositions work towards a climax in the fourth quarter of a piece and then return to initial pitch sequences. In a number of early works Buckley explored the Celtic myths of his native Ireland in orchestral scores such as Taller than Roman Spears (1977) and Fornocht do chonac thú (1980) and in small-scale works such as Oileáin (1979) for piano, Boireann (1983) for flute and piano, or I am Wind on Sea (1987) for mezzo-soprano and percussion (to be played by the singer). Later this aspect became less important for him. Works since the late 1980s display "a textural subtlety in marked contrast to the more robust sonorities explored in Buckley's earlier keyboard works", a "French refinement of sound, and an elevation of timbre as central characteristics" and "a concern with achieving a greater degree of formal unity" and "an exploration of analogies between sound and light". O'Leary (2013) described his style as "characterised by a broad harmonic idiom, contrasting consonance and dissonance in a non-tonal but strongly coloured soundworld".

In 2010, Buckley arranged a number of Irish traditional songs for flute, some with harp, viola, percussion and string quartet. These are settings in a tonal harmonic language, quite unlike his original compositions.

== Selected works ==
Orchestral

- Taller than Roman Spears (1977, rev. 1986)
- Fornocht do chonac thú (1980)
- Concerto for Chamber Orchestra (1981)
- Symphony No. 1 (1988)
- Concerto for Organ and Orchestra (1992)
- Concerto for Alto Saxophone (1997)
- Quattuor (1999) for 4 different orchestra types
- Concerto for Bassoon and Orchestra (2001)
- In Winter Light (2004)
- Campane in Aria (2006)

Chamber music

- Sonata for Cor Anglais and Piano (1973)
- Sequence (1974) for clarinet, bassoon, piano
- Keoghal (1975, rev. 1997) for 5 recorders
- Wind Quintet (1976, rev. 1985)
- Why Not' Mr Berio (1977) for trombone and piano
- Five Epigrams for Flute and Oboe (1980)
- Time Piece (1982) for flute, clarinet, cello, piano
- Boireann (1983) for flute, piano
- In Lines of Dazzling Light (1985, rev. 1998) for clarinet, bassoon, horn, violin, piano
- Saxophone Quartet (1996)
- In Winter Light (2004) for flute, guitar
- Duo (2004) for alto-flute, guitar
- Three Preludes for Two Violins (2009)
- To Lands Beyond Time (2013) for flute, viola, harp
- Piano Trio (2013)
- Wind Quintet No. 2 (2015)

Electro-acoustic music

- Constellations (2009) for flute [picc+fl+afl+bfl], tape

Solo instrumental works

- Three Pieces for Solo Flute (1973)
- Three Pieces for Solo Cello (1975)
- Oileáin (1979), piano
- Suite for Harpsichord (1983)
- Sonata for Unaccompanied Violin (1983)
- At the Round Earth's Imagin'd Corners (1985), organ
- And Wake the Purple Year (1985), piano or harpsichord
- Winter Music (1988), piano
- Three Lullabies for Deirdre (1989), piano or guitar
- Guitar Sonata No. 1 (1989)
- The Silver Apples of the Moon, the Golden Apples of the Sun (1993), piano
- Sonata for Solo Horn (1993)
- Guitar Sonata No. 2 (1998)
- Airflow (1998), flute
- Carillon (2003), organ
- Two Fantasias for Solo Alto Flute (2004)
- endless the white clouds ... (2005), harp
- A Few Notes for Jim (2005), violin
- les oiseaux rêvent dans les arbres (2011), flute
- Alla luna (2014), kannel

Opera

- The Words upon the Window-Pane (after W.B. Yeats), chamber opera (1991). Dublin: Lombard St. Studios, 17 October 1991.

Choral

- Auburn Elegy (1973) with 2 flutes, clarinet
- Pulvis et Umbra (1979) with piano
- Scél lem duíb (1981)
- Three Irish Folksongs (1984) with piano
- The Eagle (1988), children's workshop piece for female voice, children's choir, piano, 2 treble instr. ad lib., perc [opt.]
- A Thin Halo of Blue (1991) with speaker, orchestra, tape
- De Profundis (1993) with soprano & alto soloists, orchestra
- Rivers of Paradise (1993) with 2 speakers, orchestra
- Maynooth Te Deum (1995) with S, A, T, B soloists and orchestra

Solo voice

- The Seasonable Month (1973) for soprano, flute, piano
- I am Wind on Sea (1987) for mezzo, percussion
- Abendlied (1989) for soprano, piano
- The Streams of Bunclody (2010) for voice, flute, harp, viola

== Recordings ==
- Three Lullabies for Deirdre, performed by Roy Holmes (piano), on: Dreaming, Anew NEWD 406 (CD, 1994).
- Sonata for Solo Horn, performed by Cormac Ó hAodáin, on: Contemporary Music from Ireland vol. 1, CMC CD01 (CD, 1995).
- Abendlied, performed by Penelope Price Jones (soprano) & Philip Martin (piano), on: Altarus AIR-CD-9010 (CD, 1996).
- Concerto for Alto Saxophone and String Orchestra, performed by Irish Chamber Orchestra, Fionnuala Hunt (cond.), on: Strings A-Stray: The Irish Chamber Orchestra – Contemporary Works for Strings, Black Box Music BBM 1013 (CD, 1998).
- Saxophone Quartet; Fantasia No. 1; Fantasia No. 2; Three Pieces for Solo Flute; Arabesque for solo saxophone; Sonata for Solo Horn; Airflow; In Lines of Dazzling Light, performed by Quartz Saxophone Quartet, Aidin Halpin (recorder), William Dowdall (flute), Kenneth Edge (alto-sax), Cormac Ó hAodáin (horn) / Ensemble Reservoir, on: In Lines of Dazzling Light: John Buckley, Black Box Music BBM 1012 (CD, 1999).
- Three Preludes; And Wake the Purple Year; Three Lullabies for Deirdre; The Silver Apples of the Moon, the Golden Apples of the Sun; Winter Music; Oileáin, performed by Anthony Byrne (piano), on: John Buckley: Piano Music, Marco Polo 8.223784 (CD, 1999).
- Concerto for Organ and Orchestra; Symphony No. 1, performed by Peter Sweeney (organ), National Symphony Orchestra of Ireland, Colman Pearce (cond.), on: Marco Polo 8.223876 (CD, 1999).
- Guitar Sonata No. 2; Fantasia No. 1 for Alto Flute; Guitar Sonata No. 1; Three Pieces for Solo Flute; Lullaby for Deirdre; Airflow; In Winter Light, performed by William Dowdall (flute) & John Feeley (guitar), on: in winter light, Celestial Harmonies 13244-2 (CD, 2004).
- Carillon, performed by David Adams (organ), on: Irish Contemporary Organ Music at the National Concert Hall, David Adams (no label code) (CD, 2008).
- endless the white clouds, performed by Clíona Doris (harp), on: A Pale Yellow Sky, RTÉ lyric fm CD 115 (CD, 2008).
- Music When Soft Voices Die, performed by Clois Cladaigh, on: Clois Cladaigh CCLCD 002 (CD, 2008).
- Winter Echoes; Sea Echoes, performed by William Dowdall (flute), on: Works for Solo Flute, Celestial Harmonies 13253-2 (CD, 2009).
- Constellations, performed by William Dowdall (fl) with tape, on: Atoll ACD 111 (CD, 2010).
- Three Preludes, performed by Isabelle O'Connell (piano), on: Reservoir, Diatribe Solo Series DIACDSOL 001 (CD, 2010).
- Guitar Sonata No. 1, performed by Benjamin Dwyer (guitar), on: Irish Guitar Works, El Cortijo 00010 (CD, 2012).
- Variations on the Gneeveguilla Polka and folksong arrangements (2010): Air and Jig: The Hills of Templeglantine, Táimse im Chodladh, Tell her I am; Danny Boy; Eleanor Plunkett; The Plains of Boyle; Down by the Sally Gardens; My Lagan Love; She Moved Through the Fair; The Streams of Bunclody; The Bard of Armagh; The Mason's Apron, performed by William Dowdall (flute), Jimmy Kelly (voice), Lisa Dowdall (viola), Anne-Marie O'Farrell (Irish harp), Andreja Malir (harp), Noel Eccles (percussion), Dublin String Quartet, on: Celestial Harmonies 13254-2 (CD, 2012).
- Piano Trio, performed by Fidelio Trio, on: Dancing in Daylight: Contemporary Piano Trios from Ireland, Metier MSV 28556 (CD, 2015).
- I am Wind on Sea, performed by Aylish Kerrigan (mezzo, percussion), on: Métier MSV 28558 (CD, 2016).

== Bibliography ==
- Axel Klein: Die Musik Irlands im 20. Jahrhundert (Hildesheim: Georg Olms, 1996). ISBN 3-487-10196-3.
- Benjamin Dwyer: Constellations. The Life and Music of John Buckley (Dublin: Carysfort Press, 2011), ISBN 978-1-904505-52-5.
- Martin O'Leary: "Buckley, John", in: The Encyclopaedia of Music in Ireland, ed. Harry White & Brian Boydell (Dublin: UCD Press, 2013), p. 135–7; ISBN 978-1-906359-78-2.
- Benjamin Dwyer: "An Interview with John Buckley", in: B. Dwyer: Different Voices. Irish Music and Music in Ireland (Hofheim: Wolke Verlag, 2014), p. 143–154.
