= John Feeley =

Irish guitarist (born 1955)

- Born: 24 May 1955 (age 70); Ballinasloe, County Galway, Ireland
- Genres: Classical
- Occupations: Teacher, music editor
- Instrument: Guitar

John Feeley (born 24 May 1955) is an Irish classical guitarist, and a teacher and editor of guitar music.

== Life ==
Feeley was born in Ballinasloe, County Galway, Ireland. He started guitar playing in popular music, and at age 17 "was recognised as one of Europe's best electric guitarists" After graduating from Trinity College Dublin, with a first class degree in music, he moved to the USA to study with Oscar Ghiglia, Ángel Romero, and David Russell, completing a master's degree at Queens College, City University of New York. In the following years he taught at Memphis State University, Tennessee. He now teaches at the DIT Conservatory of Music and Drama, Dublin. His past students include all current members of the Dublin Guitar Quartet, along with Redmond O'Toole, Michael O'Toole and Alec O'Leary, director of the Waltons Guitar Festival of Ireland. Composers Benjamin Dwyer, Ciarán Farrell, David Fennessy and David Flynn, all of whom have written music for Feeley, were also guitar students of his.

In 2006 Feeley completed a doctorate (Doctor of Philosophy in Music [Performance]) at Maynooth University, which involved a major thesis in three volumes with the title Classical Guitar Music by Irish Composers: Performing Editions and Critical Commentary.

== Performing and recording career ==
Feeley has appeared at such festivals as the Guitar Festival of Ireland, Bath International Guitar Festival, the Dundee International Guitar Festival, and the Wirral International Guitar Festival. He has won numerous awards including the Special Award for interpretation in the 1984 Mauro Giuliani competition, Italy. He has appeared as a soloist with The American Symphony Orchestra at Carnegie Hall, the RTÉ National Symphony Orchestra, the Ulster Orchestra, the Irish Chamber Orchestra and the Contempo Quartet. He performs regularly in duet with the flautist William Dowdall.

Feeley is an enthusiastic champion of contemporary Irish music and in this capacity has commissioned works from many of Ireland's leading composers including Seóirse Bodley, John Buckley, Jerome de Bromhead, Jane O'Leary, Brent Parker and Eric Sweeney. He also has a great interest in traditional Irish and Scottish music and has recorded with The Chieftains and published his own arrangements of traditional melodies.

He has been described by The Washington Post as 'Ireland's leading classical guitarist' and by Michael Dervan in The Irish Times as "a trailblazer ... when it comes to the guitar and guitar-playing in Ireland".

== Discography ==
- e-motion. Contemporary Works for Guitar, Black Box Music BBM 1002 (CD, 1998). Contains: Ciarán Farrell: The Shannon Suite; Jerome de Bromhead: Gemini; Jane O'Leary: Four Pieces for Guitar; Dawn Kenny: e-motion; Eric Sweeney: Figurations; Michael Howard: Niagara Falls on Thomond; Brian Boydell: Three Pieces for Guitar; Andrew Shiels: The Voyage of Maeldun.
- in winter light, Celestial Harmonies13244-2 (CD, 2004); with William Dowdall, flute. Contains: John Buckley: Guitar Sonata No. 2; Fantasia No. 1 for Alto Flute; Guitar Sonata No. 1; Three Pieces for Solo Flute; Lullaby for Deirdre; Airflow; In Winter Light.
- Islands. Contemporary Irish Solo & Instrumental Works for Guitar, Overture Music, [no label code] (CD, 2010); with Laura Chislett Jones (flute) & Pavlos Kanellakis (guitar). Contains: David Fennessy: ... sting like a bee; Benjamin Dwyer: Cancion; Tango; John McLachlan: Four Pieces for Guitar; Jane O'Leary: Duo for Alto Flute and Guitar; Eric Sweeney (arr.): Three Folk Songs; Seóirse Bodley: Islands; Brent Parker: Theme and Variations for Two Guitars.

Earlier recordings, including arrangements of Irish traditional music for guitar

- Celtic Classics (Ossian)
- Sreanga Oir (Gael-Linn)
- Romanza (Marble Arch)
- John Feeley (Gael-Linn CEF 109)
- Serenade (with Raymond Burley) (CBA Classics)

== Editorships ==
- Scottish Music for Solo Guitar, two volumes (Cork: Ossian Publications, 2005)
- Contemporary Irish Music for Classic Guitar Solo (Pacific, Missouri: Mel Bay, 2012)
