= Annie Jessy Curwen =

Irish writer

Annie Jessy Curwen (c. 1845 – 22 April 1932), born Annie Jessy Gregg, usually known from her books as Mrs. Curwen or Mrs. J. Spencer Curwen, was a writer of children's books and books for music teachers, on music theory and performance, and particularly piano playing, which were published by J. Curwen & Sons Ltd. of London in the late 19th century.

== Biography ==
Annie Curwen, née Gregg, was born in Dublin, the daughter of a solicitor. She studied the piano with Joseph Robinson, Fanny Robinson, and Robert Prescott Stewart at the Royal Irish Academy of Music from 1857 to 1865, then after graduation she taught piano in Dublin until 1876. She then moved to Scotland, where she met the music educator John Curwen, a great advocate of the tonic sol-fa method for singing, which she adapted for the piano. Curwen married his eldest son, John Spencer Curwen, in 1877, and all her books were published under her married name by her father-in-law's publishing company. She died in Dublin.

== Publications ==
A typical publication that indicates her subject and approach was Mrs. Curwen's Pianoforte Method (The Child Pianist) Being a Practical Course of the Elements of Music, which ran to at least 20 editions with a separate volume The Teacher's Guide. The Child Pianist series of books was first published in 1886. Curwen first wrote it for her own children. It contained exercises and duets composed by Curwen herself and by composers John Kinross and Felix Swinstead. She wrote in a preface to the 16th edition, published in 1913, that she had based her system on a similar work by her father-in-law, John Curwen, for singing classes. Instructions for lessons were contained in the Teacher's Guide but omitted from the edition for the child student.

In 2008, a company called Pomona Press republished the title Mrs. Curwen's Pianoforte Method.

== Writings ==
- Mrs Curwen's Pianoforte Method The Teacher's Guide (London, 1913)
- Psychology Applied to Music Teaching (London, 1920)
- The C Clef Exercise Book (London, 1905)

== Bibliography ==
- "Obituary: Mrs John Spencer Curwen", in: The Musical Times, 1 June 1932.
- Richard Pine, Charles Acton (eds.): To Talent Alone. The Royal Irish Academy of Music 1848–1998 (Dublin: Gill & Macmillan, 1998).
- Jennifer O'Connor: "Curwen, Annie Jessy", in: The Encyclopaedia of Music in Ireland, ed. H. White & B. Boydell (Dublin: UCD Press, 2013), p. 272–3.
