= Jerome de Bromhead =

Irish composer (born 1945)

- Born: 1945 (age 80–81); Waterford, Ireland
- Era: Contemporary

Jerome de Bromhead (born 2 December 1945) is an Irish composer, classical guitarist, and member of Aosdána.

== Biography ==
Jerome de Bromhead was born in Waterford, Ireland. He studied with A.J. Potter and James Wilson at the Royal Irish Academy of Music in Dublin, with further studies with Seóirse Bodley in 1975 and Franco Donatoni in 1978. He holds an M.A. in music, art history and English from Trinity College Dublin. As a guitarist, he studied with Elspeth Henry (1967–68) and at the Guitar Centre, London (1969). He worked in RTÉ as a television news director and announcer, as well as a senior music producer for radio, until a serious accident forced him to retire in 1996. He currently lives in Dublin.

== Music ==
His compositions include works for solo guitar as well as orchestral, choral and chamber music. His Symphony No. 1 (1986) represented Ireland at the International Rostrum of Composers at UNESCO in Paris. He describes his style as "neither a Postmodernist nor a deaf-as-a-postmodernist. Above all I am suspicious of anything that seems like dogma."

His harpsichord piece Flux (1981) was performed at the ISCM World Music Days in Germany in 1987 and is now published by Tonos Verlag of Darmstadt.

According to guitarist John Feeley, de Bromhead's solo guitar composition Gemini (1970) is "a sophisticated work, both technically and compositionally. It has the dynamism of youth, with a sense of freshness and it projects an attractive, driving energy [...] It is an effective concert work, which speaks well on the instrument and is particularly gratifying for the performer."

== Selected works ==
Orchestral

- Abstract Variations (1976)
- Danzostinata (1978)
- Venti Eventi (1978)
- Symphony No. 1 (1985)
- Concerto for Guitar and Strings (1991, rev. 1997)
- Symphony No. 2 (1994)
- Violin Concerto No. 1 (2008)
- Corkamesca (2014) for string orchestra
- A Lay for a Light Year (2014)

Chamber music

- Frenetics (1971) for 5 saxophones, 3 trumpets, 3 trombones, piano, guitar, drumkit, double bass
- String Quartet No. 1 (1971)
- Rotastasis (1975) for 2 flutes, 2 clarinets, 2 violins, viola, cello, guitar
- Parameters (1976) for flute, clarinet, bassoon, violin, cello, piano
- String Quartet No. 2 (1977)
- Prelude for Viola and Piano (1977)
- Brass Quintet No. 1 (1979)
- Magister (1981) for flute, oboe, clarinet, bassoon, 2 violins, viola, cello
- Vespertine (1981) for flute and guitar
- Wind Quintet (1983)
- Quondam (1985) for flute, violin, viola, piano
- Brass Quintet No. 2 (1986)
- Torna un Suono (1992) for oboe, viola, cello
- Gym (1999) for mixed ensemble (10 musicians)
- Serenade (2005) for oboe/clarinet and double bass
- Baroque Restorations (2006) for accordion and piano
- Augury (2009) for violin and guitar
- Few Get to the Orient (2009) for 4 percussionists
- Noon (2009) for clarinet and piano
- Brass Canons (2014) for 4 trumpets, 4 horns, 3 trombones, euphonium, tuba
- Farewell Fair Friend (2014) for flute, clarinet, accordion, violin, cello

Solo instrumental

- Anno (1969) for guitar
- Gemini (1970) for guitar
- Benthos (1974) for piano
- Xasolos (1975) for any treble instrument
- Moto Impetuo (1977) for organ
- Flux (1981) for harpsichord
- Undulations (1984) for piano
- Three Fresh Pieces (1989) for piano
- Two Ladies Dancing (1998) film score, for piano
- Guitar Sonata No. 1 (1999)
- Gerousia (2006) for guitar
- Charlie's Lonesome Violin Blues (2009) for violin
- Fright Fight or Flight (2009) for viola
- Party Games (2009) for violin
- Pseudo Fugue and Presumptuous Postlude (2009) for cello

Vocal

- Dirge from Donne's Devotions (1975) for mixed choir
- Bláth an Aitinn (1976) for mixed choir
- Iomramh (1978) for mixed choir
- Hy Brasil (1980) for soprano, alto, tenor, bass, mixed choir, small orchestra
- Joy (1982) for soprano, baritone, mixed choir
- Music for No Myth (1992) for mezzo, spoken chorus, flute, horn, percussion, 2 violins, viola, cello
- New Lands (1993) for soprano, mezzo, baritone, piano
- The Assize of Sighs (1993) for mezzo and piano
- Clear Light and Thunder (1996) for medium voice and piano
- Lynch Triptych (1998) for mixed choir
- Ring Out Ring In (2006) for mixed choir
- Bridal Song (2008) for mezzo, tenor, bass (solos)
- In Youth is Pleasure (2008) for mezzo, tenor, bass (solos)
- My Prime of Youth (2008) for mezzo, tenor, bass (solos)
- The Dawning (2008) for mixed choir
- The Quip (2008) for mixed choir
- Love's Gleaning Tide (2009) for mixed choir
- Our Hands Have Met (2009) for mixed choir
- Not Yet Begun (2011), versions for a) soprano, viola, cello, double bass; or b) soprano, clarinet, violin, piano
- I Breathe a Drug (2013) for soprano, cello, organ
- Gaelic Prayer (2014) for mixed choir

== Scores ==
The Contemporary Music Centre (Ireland) provides scores and sample recordings of a selection of de Bromhead's works, available here.

== Recordings ==
- Gemini: Black Box Music BBM 1002 (CD, 1998), performed by John Feeley (guitar).
- Violin Concerto; Symphony No. 2; A Lay for a Light Year: Toccata Classics TOCC 0422 (CD, 2017), performed by Alan Smale (violin), RTÉ National Symphony Orchestra, Colman Pearce (conductor).
