= Fergus Johnston =

Irish composer (born 1959)

- Born: 21 May 1959 (age 66); Dublin, Ireland
- Genres: Classical music
- Instrument: Composer

Fergus Johnston (born 21 May 1959) is an Irish composer and member of Aosdána.

== Life and career ==
Johnston was born in Dublin, Ireland, the son of the physicist and political activist Roy H. W. Johnston, and studied for both a degree in music and a master's degree in Music and Media Technology at Trinity College Dublin (MusB 1982). He also has a PhD in composition from the National University of Ireland, Maynooth. Initially, he had also studied at the Royal Irish Academy of Music, Dublin (flute with Doris Keogh, clarinet with Tim Hanafin, and composition with James Wilson). In 1985, he was invited by the European Community Youth Orchestra to write an orchestral piece under the guidance of György Ligeti. From 1989 to 1991, he was Chairman of the Association of Irish Composers. He completed his education with the English composer Robert Hanson.

Johnston's output includes works for both orchestra and smaller ensembles, some works of which include electronics, and two operas. His music has been performed at many venues and festivals including the 1985 Asolo Musica Festival in Italy, the 1996 International Society for Contemporary Music Festival, the 2001 Sonorities Festival of Contemporary Music in Belfast, and Raidió Teilifís Éireann's 2005 Living Music Festival. His use of the system is unusual among Irish composers, his compositional process typically includes a significant element of pre-planning.

== Selected works ==
Stage

- Bitter Fruit (Nell McCafferty) (1992), chamber opera
- The Earl of Kildare (Celia de Fréine) (2008), opera

Orchestral works

- Samsara (1991)
- Flute Concerto (1996; rev. 2003)
- Je goûte le jeu ... (1997), for string orchestra
- Wind Symphony (1998), for wind band
- Through Hollow Lands (2002)
- Binn an tSíorsholais (2004)
- Wexford Suite (2005)
- Brahms Begins the Day (2006)
- Scenes and Interludes from 'The Earl of Kildare' (2008)

Chamber music

- Timon of Athens (William Shakespeare), incidental music (1983), 2fl, 2cl+bcl, bn, vn, gui, perc, 3 speakers
- Reflections (1984), ob, 2cl, bn, hp, vib, str qt
- Brass Quintet (1985)
- Episodes 1 (1986), fl, trb, egui, perc
- Episodes 2 (1987), fl, ob, cl
- Signals! (1989), vn, dancers (opt.)
- Incantations (1989), cl+bcl, perc
- Cusp (1992), vn, pf
- Kaleidophone (1992; rev. 1996), 2vn, va, vc, hp, perc
- Gabor Haenjo’s Variations on a Theme by Paganini (1993), cl, vc, pf
- Carn (1993), 2pf
- Líofa (1994), fl, cor ang, bcl, hn, str qt
- Opus Lepidipterae (1996), fl, pf/arec, gui/fl, hpd
- Piano Trio (2012)
- Toccata, Fugue, and A Camel's Swan-Song (2013), vc, pf
- String Quartet (2015), vn, va, vc, db

Solo instrumental

- Three Pieces for Double Bass (1980)
- Pavan and Galliard (1984), guitar
- Two Pieces for Solo Flute (1987)
- Prelude & Passacaglia (1987), violin
- Psyche (1992), alto recorder
- creepy crawlies (1993), piano
- Prelude (1993), piano
- Three Piano Pieces (1995)
- Éagaoineadh (1995), piano
- The Oul’ Winda Rag (1996), piano
- Rashad's Words (1999), percussion
- Lord Leonard Gray, His March (2006), piano
- Three Bulgarian Dances (2007), organ
- Miniatures for Scott (2015), piano

Vocal

- Two T’ang Poems (Li Ho) (1984), soprano and chamber orchestra
- The Wisdom of the World (1990), mezzo and Irish harp
- After a Childhood Away from Ireland (Eavan Boland) (1997), soprano and piano
- Five Oriental Texts (2015), soprano and chamber orchestra

Choral

- Three Songs on Words by e.e.cummings (1981; rev. 1982), S, fl, cl, bn
- now I lay (with everywhere around) (e.e. cummings) (1983), satb
- Praise Music (Psalms) (1988), satb
- Sine musica nulla vita (1988), ssatb
- The Little Snowgirl (1991), A, B, children's vv, female vv, orch
- Psalm 84 (1996; rev. 1997), satb & organ

Electro-acoustic

- Morríghan (2000), baroque fl, hpd, live electronics
- Méadú (2001), vn, pf, tape
- Árd Fhearta (2001), 2ob, 2fl, 2cl, 2bn, 2tpt, 2trb, tb, bronze-age hn, live electronics

== Recordings ==
- Samsara, performed by Ruse Philharmonic Orchestra, Tsanko Delibosov (cond), on: Vienna Modern Masters VMM 3035 (CD, 1996).
- Kaleidophone, performed by Concorde, on: Contemporary Music Centre CD02 (promotional CD, 1997).
- Je goûte le jeu ..., performed by Irish Chamber Orchestra, Fionnuala Hunt (cond), on: Black Box Music BBM 1013 (CD, 1998).
- Árd Fhearta; Carn; Signals; Samsara, performed by Reamonn Keary (pf), Shirin Goudarze-Tobin & Frantisek Jaros (vn), Ruse Philharmonic Orchestra, Tsanko Delibosov (cond), on: Monumental Music MOMU 014 (CD, 2001).
- Three Bulgarian Pieces, performed by Vox 21, on: RTÉ lyric fm CD 123 (CD, 2009).
- Piano Trio, performed by Fidelio Trio, on: Metier MSV 28556 (CD, 2015).

== Honours and awards ==
- 1989 – Macaulay Fellowship, Arts Council of Ireland
- 1992 – Elected to Aosdána, Ireland's Academy of Arts.
- 1996-2001 - Appointed as member of the Board of Directors of the National Concert Hall of Ireland, An Ceoláras Náisiúnta.

== Sources ==
- Arts Council of Ireland reference page
- Fergus Johnston at the Contemporary Music Centre of Ireland
- Axel Klein: Die Musik Irlands im 20. Jahrhundert (Hildesheim: Georg Olms, 1996)
- The Encyclopaedia of Music in Ireland, ed. H. White & B. Boydell (Dublin: UCD Press, 2013)
