= Mike Nielsen =

Irish musician and composer

- Born: 21 February 1961 (age 65); Sligo, Ireland
- Genres: Jazz, classical
- Occupations: Singer, musician
- Instrument: Guitar
- Label: Lyte

Mike Nielsen (born 21 February 1961) is an Irish guitarist, composer, and educator specializing in jazz and improvised music.

== Career ==
Born in Sligo, he began on ukulele at the age of four. He studied at the Royal Irish Academy of Music and the Dublin College of Music as well as the Berklee College, Boston.

Performing on acoustic and electric guitars, he has worked with Kenny Wheeler, Larry Coryell, Kenny Werner, Jason Moran, Simon Nabatov, Eric Revis, Joe Lovano and Dave Liebman, with whom he toured Europe in 2001, New Zealand/Australia in 2004 and has recorded two albums. He has also performed with the Crash Ensemble and featured as a soloist with the RTÉ Concert Orchestra.

Nielsen is Director of Jazz Performance at the Dublin Institute of Technology Conservatory of Music and Drama.

== Discography ==
- Solo at Garden City (2000)
- Osmosis (2003)
- Sound Recipes (2004)
- Evolution with Benjamin Dwyer (2005)
