= Doris Keogh =

Irish flautist and flute teacher

- Born: Doris Cleary; 16 April 1922; Dublin
- Died: 10 August 2012 (aged 90); London
- Known for: Flute teacher

Doris Keogh (16 April 1922 – 10 August 2012) was an Irish flautist and flute teacher.

== Biography ==
Doris Keogh, née Cleary, was born in Dublin to Victor-Louis Cleary and Mary Elizabeth Hughes. Her father was a professional flute player based in Rathgar, Dublin. Keogh spent four years living with her grandparents in Howth after her mother died. She grew up mostly in Adelaide Road, Dublin. Her father taught her the flute before she took up working with Thomas Brown. She went on to study harmony with Dr J. J. O'Reilly and piano with Josephine Reidy at the Municipal School of Music (now the TU Dublin Conservatory) on top of her flute studies with Colonel Frederick Sauerzweig. Keogh later said that her ballet classes in the Abbey School of Ballet helped her playing as it improved and supported her posture.

Keogh's first public performance came when she was fourteen and she accompanied her aunt Sylvia Dormer at a recital in Mariner's Church, Dún Laoghaire, County Dublin. Keogh later came first with her solo flute performance at the 1939 Dublin Feis Ceoil. From 1944, Keogh played with the Radio Éireann Orchestra and from 1948 Radio Éireann Symphony Orchestra and the Radio Éireann Light Orchestra. She was irritated that women members were paid less than men and campaigned for pay equality. In the 1950s, she focused on raising her family but returned increasingly to work as a freelance musician from the 1960s. She also taught flute at the Royal Irish Academy of Music from 1969. Her pupils included Nicola Lindsay, composers John Buckley and Fergus Johnston, and jazz flautist Brian Dunning.

In 1941, Keogh was a founder member of the Dublin Orchestral Players. She founded the Capriol Consort in 1970, which gave performances of music, dance and song from the twelfth to seventeenth centuries in period costume. With this group she toured Italy in 1976. The group included many of her students who were becoming dominant in the music scene. Many won Arts Council scholarships and were becoming notable in Dublin music competitions. She invited players such as James Galway and Pedro Memelsdorff to teach in Dublin. By 1988, when Keogh was given a millennium award, she was considered one of the most influential flute teachers in the field. She was honoured in 1991 by a group of students who launched the Doris Keogh Trust Fund at a concert in the National Concert Hall. The fund is administered by the Arts Council and is given every other year to an Irish flute or recorder player.

Keogh retired from the RIAM in 1993. She was awarded an honorary fellowship. She continued teaching with the TU Conservatory of Music and Drama as well as privately. Keogh died in London on 10 August 2012.

== Private life ==
She met her husband Val Keogh at the Municipal School of Music. He was a photographer and percussionist, whom she married in 1947. He later became the manager of the Radio Éireann Symphony Orchestra. They lived in Howth and had five children.
