= Ailbhe McDonagh =

Irish cellist (born 1982)

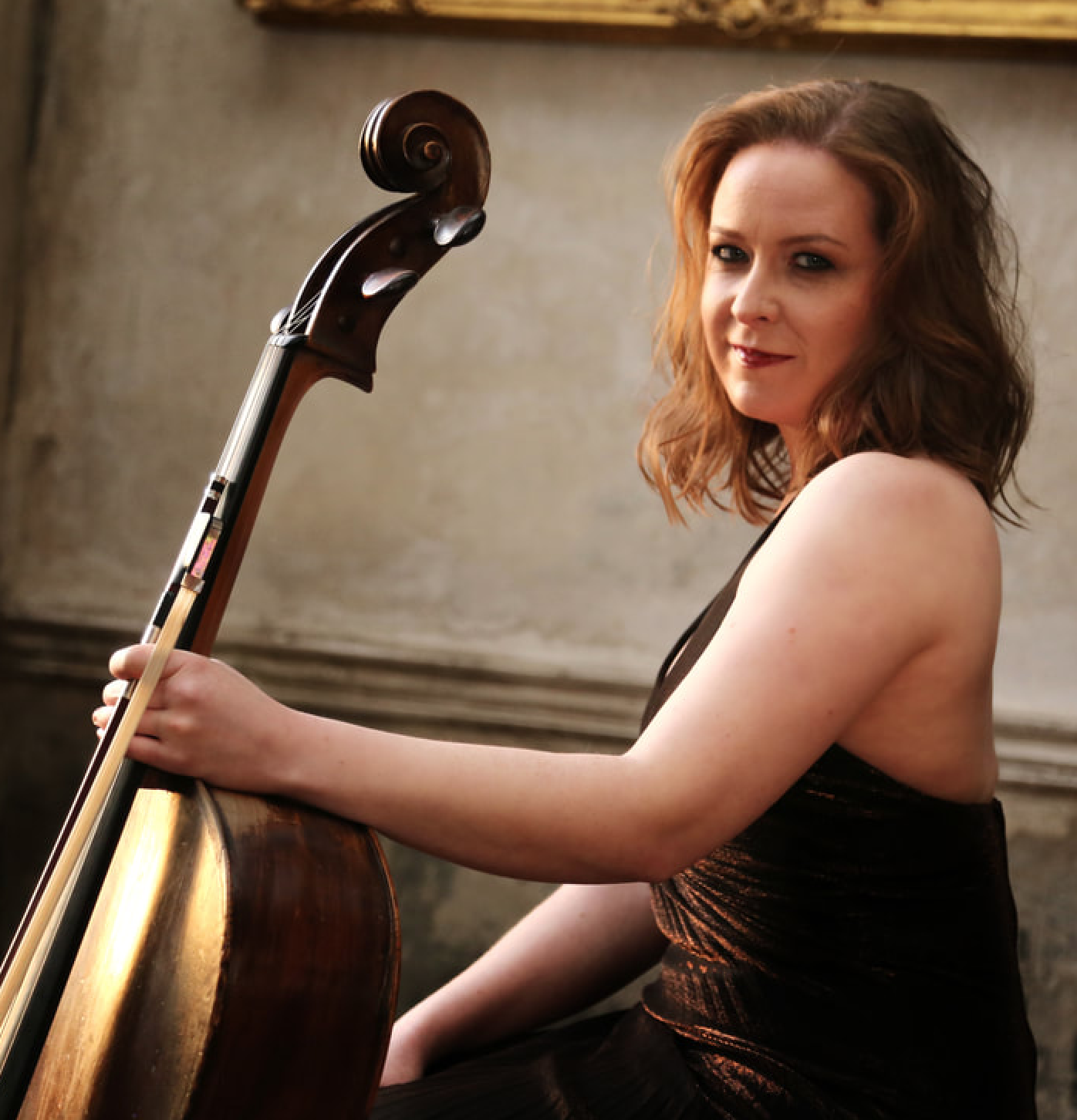

Background information
- Born: 29 November 1982 (age 43); Dublin, Ireland
- Genre: Classical
- Instrument: Cello
- Labels: Steinway, Boosey & Hawkes
- Website: www.ailbhemcdonagh.com

Ailbhe McDonagh (born 29 November 1982) is an Irish concert cellist and composer. She performs internationally as a soloist, chamber musician and recording artist with several studio albums to her name. McDonagh has composed works for orchestra, chamber music ensembles and pedagocial purposes. Collections of her compositions have been published by Boosey & Hawkes and are featured regularly in the ABRSM, Royal Irish Academy of Music and other exam syllabi. McDonagh is a professor of cello at the Royal Irish Academy of Music in Dublin, Ireland.

== Career ==
Born in Dublin, Ailbhe McDonagh is a graduate of the Eastman School of Music, Rochester, New York, USA, where she studied under Steven Doane, and the Royal Irish Academy of Music (RIAM), Dublin, Ireland. She currently teaches cello performance at the RIAM.

She performs internationally and has appeared as a concerto soloist numerous times in Ireland and abroad, with performances at Carnegie Hall, the Yale Norfolk Festival, Schleswig Holstein Music Festival, Great Irish Houses Festival, for the Irish President at Áras an Uachtaráin and on Irish national television and radio.

As a chamber musician, McDonagh performs with pianist John O'Conor and also in a duo, The McDonagh Sisters, with her sister and pianist Orla McDonagh. She is a member of the chamber music group Ficino Ensemble and the crossover group Trio Elatha where she plays traditional Irish music on the cello.

McDonagh joined the cello faculty of the RIAM in 2010 and has been invited to give masterclasses worldwide. Her debut solo album It’s a Cello Thing was named CD of the Week on Ireland's national classical music station RTÉ Lyric FM. Her second studio album Skellig was released in 2020 with pianist Orla McDonagh.

In 2021, McDonagh released the complete Beethoven cello and piano sonatas with John O'Conor on the Steinway & Sons label. The recording was positively reviewed with Classical Music Sentinel stating "McDonagh and O'Conor coalesce perfectly, as if propelled by the music's undertow, and echo each other's expressive mien with dynamic balance", awarding it as one of their "Essential Recordings". Classical Explorer remarked that the duo "take the opening of Op. 102/1 to whispered heights, and again later there is a most appealing sense of two-as-one. They find buoyant, almost dancing, rhythms". AllMusic gave the album 4.5 out of 5 stars.

McDonagh released her album Bach: Complete Solo Cello Suites in 2024 on the Steinway & Sons label. It was the first such recording of these works by an Irish cellist. Reviewer Simon Corely from Concerto Net writing about the recording says that "McDonagh convinces with her clear articulation, her drive and vigour, and her very meticulous phrasing. In a very clear recording, she progresses in a firm and resolute manner to the truth and solidity of the discourse, without the interpreter's, or the composer's, ego becoming excessively prominent."

In November 2025, McDonagh released the album Christmas on Cello & Piano with her sister Orla McDonagh.

McDonagh performs on a Postacchini cello.

== Composer career ==
In addition to her performing career, McDonagh is also an established composer with numerous compositions and commissions to her name. London-based publishers Boosey & Hawkes have released two books of her piano music entitled It's a Piano Thing. In 2021, McDonagh published further collections of compositions titled It's a Cello Thing, a collection of two books of pedagogical pieces for cello. Her compositions have featured regularly in the syllabi of ABRSM, RCM, RIAM, and other music institutions. She collaborates with many composers and other artists worldwide and has recorded several works of contemporary music.

Her debut orchestral work, the Irish Isles Suite, was released in 2023. Each movement of the composition is based around a specific island off the west coast of Ireland. A recording of this three-movement piece for orchestra was made by RTÉ Concert Orchestra and conductor David Brophy in the same year. McDonagh composed and released her String Quartet No.2 'Lore Quartet' in December 2023 which was premiered by the Ficino Ensemble and featured in The Strad magazine's 'Premiere of the Month'.

The recording of McDonagh's violin concerto The Irish Four Seasons was released by Irish violinist Lynda O'Connor on the AVIE Records label in August 2024. This new work in four movements, each representing a season of the year, was inspired by Vivaldi’s Four Seasons, which McDonagh intertwined with Irish influences. IntoClassical commenting on the new composition noted "McDonagh’s work is the real interest here: taking each season in one movement, the composer weaves together Irish melodies and Glass-like repetition to stirring effect."

== Recordings ==
=== Albums & EPs ===
Year	Title	Notes
2012	It's a Cello Thing	With Orla McDonagh, debut album
2015	Trasnán	With Trio Elatha
2017	It's a Piano Thing, Books 1 & 2	Composer & performer, released by Boosey & Hawkes
2019	Winter	With Ficino Ensemble, released by Ergodos
2020	Skellig	With Orla McDonagh
2021	Complete Beethoven Cello & Piano Sonatas	With John O'Conor, released by Steinway & Sons
2021	It's a Cello Thing, Books 1 & 2	Composer & performer, released by Boosey & Hawkes
2023	Irish Isles Suite	Composer, with RTÉ Concert Orchestra and conductor David Brophy
2024	Bach: Complete Solo Cello Suites	Soloist, released by Steinway & Sons
2024	The Irish Seasons	Composer, released by Avie Records
2025	It's a Violin Thing, Books 1 & 2	Composer & performer, released by Boosey & Hawkes
2025	Christmas on Cello & Piano	With Orla McDonagh
2026	Dance Suite for Solo Cello	Composer & performer, released by Boosey & Hawkes

== Publications ==
=== Books ===
Year	Title	Publisher
2017	It's a Piano Thing Book 1	Boosey & Hawkes
2017	It's a Piano Thing Book 2	Boosey & Hawkes
2021	It's a Cello Thing Book 1	Boosey & Hawkes
2021	It's a Cello Thing Book 2	Boosey & Hawkes
2024	It's a Ukulele Thing	Boosey & Hawkes
2025	It's a Violin Thing Book 1	Boosey & Hawkes
2025	It's a Violin Thing Book 2	Boosey & Hawkes
