= Nicola Lindsay =

Nicola Lindsay (born 1944 in London) is an English writer and actor, living in the Republic of Ireland. She writes novels, poetry, screenplays, children's books and material for radio and the theatre.

== Biography ==
Lindsay was educated at the Perse School for Girls in Cambridge, where she was known as Nicky Townley. She trained as a nurse at Guy's Hospital, London before moving to Dublin where she completed a modelling course with the Miriam Woodbyrne Agency.

She lived in West Africa, studying drama with the Festival Players and playing in the Pro Musica chamber orchestra for five years before returning to Ireland. On her return, she studied flute in the Royal Irish Academy of Music with Doris Keogh and later with Andre Prieur. Moving to County Wicklow in 1975, Lindsay continued to play the flute with the Dublin Orchestral Players and the Dublin Symphony Orchestra. She also wrote and illustrated her first book for children, Batty Cat, which was published several years later.

In 1994, she started to write seriously and has had five novels published by Poolbeg Press (A Place for Unicorns, Diving through Clouds, Eden Fading, Tumbling Jude and Butterfly), two illustrated children's books (Batty Cat and My Magic Place) and a collection of her poetry, Lines of Thought. A collection of her broadcast pieces for Sunday Miscellany on RTE 1 is also available on Amazon. She now has eight novels available on Amazon Kindle Books. Four of which have a para-normal theme.

Lindsay records her own work on RTÉ 1 and has read her short stories and monologues and talked about her work in a wide variety of venues, including schools and libraries, Trinity College, Dublin, Mount Juliet and also for the Irish Country Women's Association. Lindsay returned to serious acting in 2008, playing Ana in The Clean House by Sarah Ruhl in The New Theatre, Temple Bar, Dublin.

She has had numerous articles, scripts, short stories and poems published in magazines, journals and collections in both the UK and Ireland. Her novel, Diving Through Clouds, has been published in the United States and in the Reader's Digest Select Editions in several countries. A Place for Unicorns has also been published in Germany.

Lindsay hosted an Arts slot on East Coast Radio and has written and recorded many scripts for the Sunday Miscellany programme on RTE Radio One and has read her work on the Book on One and Lyric FM. She has been interviewed on radio and television on the BBC, RTE 1 and TV3. For several years she has performed her own one woman show in a wide variety of venues.

In 2007, she completed a screenwriting course and is now involved in writing both for the theatre and the screen. Her monologues have been performed by members of the Attic Studio, Dublin and also on the radio and stage. The Dry Rain Theatre Company has also performed her revue, Electric Gas. In 2008, Lindsay attended workshops at the Gaiety School of Acting in Dublin and also with directors Vinny Murphy and Graham Cantwell. She has worked in feature and short films and television commercials and is also a voice-over artist.

Lindsay completed her first full-length script for the stage, Christmas Fairy Tells All - a wacky, alternative Christmas show for grown ups. It was staged at The New Theatre, Temple Bar, Dublin from Monday 29 November to Saturday 4 December 2010.

In February 2011, she joined the cast of Ireland's only soap opera, Fair City, on RTÉ 1 television, playing the part of Grace Cleary.

Cancer treatment over an eighteen-month period reduced her writing and acting activities but, in 2013, she returned to work with increased enthusiasm. In 2017, she joined forces with the artist Naomi Peppard, working on a children's book called The Song of the Ha-Ha Bird.

She is a member of Irish Actors' Equity, the Irish Film and Television Academy and the Irish Writers' Union. She is also a member of Piehole voice-over agency. She has three adult daughters and lives in County Kildare in Ireland with her husband, Charles Dudley.
