= Seóirse Bodley =

Irish composer (1933–2023)

Seóirse Bodley (pronounced [ˈʃoːɾˠʃə]; 4 April 1933 – 17 November 2023) was an Irish composer and associate professor of music at University College Dublin (UCD). He was the first composer to become a Saoi of Aosdána, in 2008. Bodley is widely regarded as one of the most important composers of twentieth-century art music in Ireland, having been "integral to Irish musical life since the second half of the twentieth century, not just as a composer, but also as a teacher, arranger, accompanist, adjudicator, broadcaster, and conductor".

== Biography ==
Bodley was born George Pascal Bodley in Dublin. His father was George James Bodley (1879–1956), an employee of the London Midland & Scottish Railway Company (Dublin office), and later of the Dublin Ports and Docks Board. His mother, Mary (née Gough, 1891–1977), worked for the Guinness brewery. He attended schools in the Dublin suburbs of Phibsboro and Glasnevin before he moved at the age of nine to Coláiste Mhuire at Parnell Square. He later studied at the School of Commerce in Rathmines, where he obtained his Leaving Certificate.

Music was encouraged in his parents' home, and he received initial lessons on the mandolin from his father and on the piano from his mother. He studied the piano, harmony and counterpoint at the Royal Irish Academy of Music, and obtained a Licentiate in piano from Trinity College, London. From the age of 13, he also enrolled for a time at the Brendan Smith Academy of Acting. While he was still at school, Bodley received his first lessons in composition privately from the Dublin-based German choral conductor Hans Waldemar Rosen (1904–1994), which continued, on and off, until 1956. From his student days he performed as an accompanist to singers and took part in chamber music performances. An important element in his musical education was the twice-weekly free concerts given by the Radio Éireann Symphony Orchestra in the Phoenix Hall, Dame Court, where he had the opportunity to hear leading Irish and international performers and conductors presenting both classics and modern repertory.

From 1952 he studied for a Bachelor of Music degree from University College Dublin (UCD), mainly with Anthony Hughes. He obtained the degree in 1955. From 1957 to 1959 he studied composition (with Johann Nepomuk David) and conducting at the Musikhochschule in Stuttgart, Germany, and a year later he obtained a Doctorate in Music from UCD. He also took classes in conducting with Hans Müller-Kray and Karl Maria Zwißler, and in piano with Alfred Kreutz. He returned to Germany several times in the early 1960s to participate in courses at the Darmstädter Ferienkurse, which significantly expanded his knowledge of avant-garde techniques.

From 1959 until his retirement in 1998, Bodley lectured at the university's music department, becoming associate professor in 1984. During the 1960s, Bodley was conductor of the Culwick Choral Society.

Bodley's development as a composer saw several distinct phases. In the 1970s he merged avant-garde styles with elements from Irish traditional music and became a figure of national importance. He received several prestigious commissions for large-scale works, such as Symphony No. 3 (1981), written for the opening of the National Concert Hall.

In 1982 Bodley became a founder-member of Aosdána and President Mary McAleese conferred the distinction of Saoi on him in November 2008. McAleese said that Bodley "has helped us to recast what it means to be an artist in Ireland".

Bodley died on 17 November 2023, at the age of 90.

== Music ==
Bodley's first significant composition was his Music for Strings, which was given its premiere on 10 December 1952 by the Dublin Orchestral Players under the baton of Brian Boydell. Among his subsequent works are seven symphonies, five for full orchestra and two for chamber ensemble. a wide range of instrumental and vocal music, including the orchestral piece A Small White Cloud Drifts over Ireland (1975), four string quartets, and several large song cycles.

Klein (1996) distinguishes four creative phases in Bodley's work. The first encompasses the early years until 1961 when influences of Paul Hindemith and of his Stuttgart teacher J. N. David were audible in works like his Music for Strings, the Violin Sonata (1959) or the Symphony No. 1 (1959), when he arranged numerous Irish traditional tunes for choir and for orchestra, and when he also wrote a number of songs to the baritone voice of Tomás Ó Súilleabháin. This is a largely tonal phase, rather reflecting his technical skills than any great degree of originality. There is a marked development in works of the 1960s beginning with the Divertimento for string orchestra (1961) and continuing particularly after his three visits to the Darmstadt New Music Summer School (1963, '64, '65). Cox noted "The instrumental writing is notably more experimental than in Bodley's previous orchestral works, with its frequent recourse to colouristic string effects. It musical language is also more adventurous, and the piece also displays his first tentative foray into using all twelve tones of the chromatic within a theme […]."

For the remainder of the decade, he was, according to the Grove Dictionary of Music and Musicians "the principal Irish exponent of post-serial compositional procedures". The visits to Darmstadt, made possible with the awarding of the Macauley Fellowship in 1962, led to the belief that the avant-garde style taught there "was almost the only way that music could develop". Key works of this phase include the piano piece Prelude, Toccata and Epilogue (1963), the Chamber Symphony No. 1 (1964), the String Quartet No. 1 (1968) and the Meditations on Lines of Patrick Kavanagh (1971). The String Quartet has been described as a work of "extreme complexity", representing "a peak of abstraction unique in Bodley's output".

A third work-phase from 1972 to 1980 is characterised by an intense discourse between the idioms of Irish traditional music and the European avant-garde. This is obvious in works like The Narrow Road to the Deep North for two pianos (1972; one-piano version, 1977), the orchestral score A Small White Cloud Drifts over Ireland (1975), and the 40-minute song cycle A Girl (1978) to words by Brendan Kennelly. Though not universally applauded, particularly in Ireland, it has also been hailed as the "most coherent and challenging use of traditional music in a modern context" that "no longer sought to fuse the traditional with the sophisticated, but openly confronted the different musical materials, traditional melodies clashing with modern discords, triads with clusters". A less clearly defined fourth work-phase followed during the 1980s and '90s, with Bodley's compositions reflecting both Irish and European influences. Examples of this mature style can be found in Phantasms (1989), a 20-minute chamber piece for flute, clarinet, harp, and cello, and his String Quartet No. 2 (1992), in which melodic traits of Irish traditional music are applied in a very subtle way. In large-scale works such as his Symphonies Nos 4 and 5 (both completed in 1991), the "public" commissions partly led to a neo-Romantic style with very little resemblance to earlier phases in Bodley's output.

A potential fifth phase occurred after around 1999, beginning with works like the substantial piano compositions News from Donabate (1999) and An Exchange of Letters (2002). "Bodley now allows himself to include tonal elements within his freely atonal language and to use serially generated material […]". Late works like the String Quartets No. 3 (2004) and No. 4 (2007) and the Piano Trio (2014) display a remarkable energy and density of expression. He also continues to be drawn to setting poetic texts and has produced highly original scores in After Great Pain (words by Emily Dickinson and Walt Whitman, 2002) for mezzo and piano, Mignon und der Harfner for soprano, baritone and piano (2004) and Zeiten des Jahres for soprano and guitar (2004), both on poems by Goethe, and The Hiding Places of Love (2011) for soprano and piano on words by Seamus Heaney.

Bodley's liturgical music stands somewhat apart from these stylistic shifts. It includes congregational masses like the Mass of Peace (1976), Mass of Joy (1978), Mass of Glory (1980) and smaller works such as a Hymn to St John of God (1978) and Amra Cholum Cille (2007) for mixed choir.

Besides concert and liturgical music, Bodley has written music for film and television for many years, examples being the TV documentaries Michael Davitt and the Land League (1979), James Joyce: 'Is there one who understands me?' (1981), the RTÉ series Caught in a Free State (1983) and W. B. Yeats: Cast a Cold Eye (1988). Probably Bodley's most widely heard work is his orchestral arrangement of the traditional Irish tune "The Palatine's Daughter", which was used as the theme music for RTÉ's rural drama series The Riordans.

== Selected works ==
Orchestra

- Music for Strings for string orchestra (1952)
- Movement for Orchestra (1956)
- Symphony No. 1 (1959)
- Chamber Symphony No. 1 (1964)
- Configurations (1967)
- A Small White Cloud Drifts over Ireland (1975)
- Symphony No. 2: I Have Loved the Lands of Ireland (1980)
- Chamber Symphony No. 2 (1982)
- Symphony No. 5: The Limerick Symphony (1991)
- Sinfonietta (2000)
- Metamorphoses on the Name Schumann (2004)

Voice with orchestra

- Mediations on Lines from Patrick Kavanagh (Patrick Kavanagh) (1971)
- Ceathrúintí Mháire Ní Ógáin (Máire Mhac an tSaoi) (1973)
- Symphony No. 3: Ceol (Brendan Kennelly) (1980)
- Fraw Musica (Martin Luther, Johann Walter) (1996)
- Earlsfort Suite (Micheal O'Siadhail) (2000)

Chamber music

- Violin Sonata (1959)
- Scintillae for 2 Irish harps (1968)
- String Quartet No. 1 (1968)
- In Memory of Seán Ó Riada for flute and piano (1971)
- September Preludes for flute and piano (1973)
- Trio for flute, violin and piano (1986)
- The Fiddler for string trio and speaker (1987)
- Phantasms for flute, clarinet, harp and cello (1989)
- String Quartet No. 2 (1992)
- String Quartet No. 3: Ave atque vale (2004)
- Islands for guitar (2006)
- String Quartet No. 4 (2007)
- Dancing in Daylight for violin, cello and piano (2014)

Piano music

- Four Little Pieces (1954)
- Prelude, Toccata and Epilogue (1963)
- The Narrow Road to the Deep North for 2 pianos (1972), for piano solo (1977)
- The Tightrope Walker Presents a Rose (1976)
- Aislingí (1977)
- News from Donabate (1999)
- An Exchange of Letters (2002)

Choral Music (a capella)

- Trí hAmhráin Grá (anon.) (1952)
- Cúl an Tí (Seán Ó Ríordáin) (1955)
- An Bhliain Lán (Tomás Ó Floinn) (1956)
- Trí Aortha (anon.) (1960)
- A Chill Wind (B. Kennelly) (1977)
- The Radiant Moment (Thomas MacGreevy) (1979)

Songs, Song cycles (for voice and piano, if not otherwise mentioned)

- The Fairies (William Allingham) (1953)
- A Drinking Song (William Butler Yeats) (1953)
- Never to have Lived is Best (W.B. Yeats) (1965)
- A Girl (B. Kennelly), song cycle (1978)
- A Passionate Love (Seóirse Bodley) (1985)
- Canal Bank Walk (1986)
- The Naked Flame, song cycle (M. O'Siadhail) (1987)
- Carta Irlandesa, song cycle (Antonio González-Guerrero) (1988)
- By the Margins of the Great Deep (George Russell) (1995)
- After Great Pain (Emily Dickinson, Walt Whitman) (2002)
- Mignon und der Harfner (Johann Wolfgang von Goethe) for soprano, baritone and piano (2004)
- Zeiten des Jahres (J.W. von Goethe) for soprano and guitar (2004)
- Squall (M. O'Siadhail) (2006)
- Remember (Christina Rossetti) (2011)
- Gretchen (J.W. von Goethe) for soprano, mezzo-soprano, cello, chamber choir and piano (2012)

Arrangements Numerous arrangements of Irish traditional music for orchestra; choir & orchestra; solo voice, choir & orchestra; solo voice and piano/harp; unaccompanied choirs; choir & organ; choir & piano; and others

== Recordings ==
Based on Klein (2001), with more recent ones as linked below.

- Music for Strings, performed by Radio Éireann Symphony Orchestra, Milan Horvat (cond.), on: Decca (USA) DL 9843 (LP, 1958).
- Iníon an Phailitínigh (folksong arrangement for orchestra), performed by Radio Éireann Light Orchestra, Éimear Ó Broin (cond.), on: Gael-Linn CEF 001 (LP, 1958), re-issued as Gael-Linn CEFCD 001 (CD, 2009).
- Táim Gan Im Gan Ór (folksong arrangement for orchestra), performed by Radio Éireann Light Orchestra, Éimear Ó Broin (cond.), on: Gael-Linn CEF 004 (LP, c.1960).
- I Will Walk with My Love (arr.), performed by RTÉ Singers, Hans Waldemar Rosen (cond.), on: Harmonia Mundi HMS 30691 (LP, 1965).
- Prelude, Toccata and Epilogue, performed by Charles Lynch (piano), on: New Irish Recording Company NIR 001 (LP, 1971).
- String Quartet No. 1, performed by RTÉ String Quartet, on: New Irish Recording Company NIR 006 (LP, 1973).
- Chamber Symphony no. 1, performed by New Irish Chamber Orchestra, André Prieur (cond.), on: New Irish Recording Company NIR 012 (LP, 1974).
- I Will Walk with My Love (arr.), performed by Culwick Choral Society, Eric Sweeney (cond.), on: New Irish Recording Company DEB 002 (LP, 1974).
- Mass of Peace, performed by Clonliffe College Choir, S. Bodley (cond.), on: Network Tapes NTO 55C (MC, 1977).
- Mass of Joy; Hymn to St. John of God, [no performers mentioned], on: Network Tapes NTO 102C (MC, 1979).
- A Girl; The Narrow Road to the Deep North, performed by Bernadette Greevy (mezzo) and John O'Conor (piano), Gael-Linn CEF 085 (LP & MC, 1980).
- Laoi Chainte an Tombac (folksong arrangement f. choir), performed by Cór Naomh Mhúire, Fintan Ó Murchu (cond.), on: Corkfest Records 94 (CD, 1994).
- The Naked Flame; Carta Irlandesa; By the Margin of the Great Deep, performed by Aylish Kerrigan (mezzo), S. Bodley (piano), on: Echo Classics Digital (CD, 1996).
- Symphony No. 4; Symphony No. 5: The Limerick Symphony, performed by National Symphony Orchestra of Ireland, Colman Pearce (cond.), on: Marco Polo 8.225157 (CD, 2001).
- A Small White Cloud Drifts over Ireland; Chamber Symphony No. 1; Symphony No. 2: I Have Loved the Lands of Ireland, performed by RTÉ National Symphony Orchestra, Robert Houlihan (cond.), on: RTÉ Lyric fm CD 121 (CD, 2008).
- The Narrow Road to the Deep North, performed by Isabelle O'Connell (piano), on: Diatribe DIACDSOL 001 (CD, 2010).
- Islands, performed by John Feeley (guitar), on: Overture Music [no matrix no.] (CD, 2010).
- Dancing in Daylight, performed by Fidelio Trio, on: Metier MSV 28556 (CD, 2015).
- String Quartet No. 1 (first movement), performed by RTÉ ConTempo Quartet, on: RTÉ lyric fm CD 153 (CD, 2016).
- After Great Pain; Remember; The Tightrope Walker Presents a Rose, performed by Aylish Kerrigan (mezzo) and Dearbhla Collins (piano), on: Métier MSV 28558 (CD, 2016).
- A Girl (songcycle), performed by Aylish Kerrigan (mezzo) and Dearbhla Collins (piano), on: Métier MSV 28560 (CD, 2017).

== Bibliography ==
- Charles Acton: "Interview with Seóirse Bodley", in: Éire-Ireland 5 (1970) 3, pp. 117–33.
- Malcolm Barry: "Examining the Great Divide", in: Soundpost 16 (Oct./Nov. 1983), p. 15–20.
- Axel Klein: "'Aber was ist heute schon noch abenteuerlich?'. Ein Portrait des irischen Komponisten Seóirse Bodley", in: MusikTexte no. 52, Jan. 1994, p. 21–5.
- Gareth Cox & Axel Klein (eds.): Irish Music in the Twentieth Century (= Irish Musical Studies 7) (Dublin: Four Courts Press, 2003), ISBN 1-85182-647-5.
- Lorraine Byrne Bodley: A Hazardous Melody of Being: Seóirse Bodley's Song Cycles on the Poems of Micheal O'Siadhail (Dublin: Carysfort Press, 2008), ISBN 978-1-904505-31-0.
- Gareth Cox: Seóirse Bodley (Dublin: Field Day Publications, 2010), ISBN 978-0-946755-48-6.
- Lorraine Byrne Bodley: A Community of the Imagination: Seóirse Bodley's Goethe Settings (Dublin: Carysfort Press, 2013); ISBN 978-1-909325-31-9.
- Benjamin Dwyer: "An Interview with Seóirse Bodley", in: B. Dwyer: Different Voices. Irish Music and Music in Ireland (Hofheim: Wolke Verlag, 2014), p. 82–93.
