= Ellen Duncan =

Irish art gallery director and critic

- Born: 2 April 1862; Dublin
- Died: 1937 (aged 74–75)

Ellen Maria Duncan (2 April 1862 – 1937) was an Irish art gallery director and critic. She was the first curator of the Municipal Gallery of Modern Art in Dublin, now known as the Hugh Lane Gallery.

== Biography ==
Ellen (Ellie) Duncan, née Douglas, was born in Dublin to Thomas and Sarah Collis Douglas. She received her education at Alexandra College before completing it at the Royal Irish Academy of Music.

She married James (Jim) Duncan in Dublin on 25 July 1892 and they had two children, Beatrix (Betty) and Alan who went to Paris in the 1920s and mixed with Beckett and Joyce. Ellie's husband was a staff officer in the Teacher's Pension Office at Dublin Castle. Ellie Duncan wrote for various newspapers and magazines including the Burlington Magazine, Studio and the Athenæum. By 1901 she is identified in the census as a journalist; she was known for having coined the phrase "The drama of the drawingroom". Ellie occasionally acted in the many theatrical performances that took place around Dublin in the aftermath of the Revival.

In 1907, Ellie Duncan founded the United Arts Club and remained its honorary secretary until 1922 and she and her husband Jim remained life-long "honorary members" thereafter. In the 20s and 30s she spent most of her time in London and Paris mixing with literary luminaries such as Beckett. By 1911 she had become an art critic, and in the census artist Casimir Markievicz was recorded as staying with the family. His wife Constance Markievicz doesn't appear on any census forms in 1911, which may be because she was arrested for the first time that year and she might have been in jail. Alternatively, she may have taken part in the boycott of the census carried out by the suffragists.

In 1911 and 1912, Duncan arranged two important art exhibitions in Dublin, the first time such Avant-garde artists and their paintings were shown in Ireland. Among the art was work from Cézanne, Matisse, Rouault, Picasso, Denis, Vlaminck, and Signac. The exhibitions were arranged through the Dublin United Arts Club and entitled Works by Post Impressionist Painters and Modern French pictures. Duncan went on to become the first curator of the Municipal Gallery of Modern Art, Dublin, from 1914 to 1922. She was involved in the process to ensure Hugh Lane's works were kept with the gallery in Dublin. Duncan also refused to hang art donated to the gallery which was commissioned by the government in Westminster to depict scenes from the First World War. Duncan was a life long friend of Percy French who was a member of the club. He had re-located to London in 1900 but returned regularly to Ireland to entertain, often staying at the club or with the Duncan's at their flat in Ely Place, Dublin. Their daughter Beatrix (Betty) collaborated with French in his entertainment, especially in the war years. Bettie determined war paintings were inappropriate to display in the aftermath of the Easter Rising executions. Many of her papers and letters are today kept in the National Library of Ireland's Department of Manuscripts
