= Bernard Geary =

Irish composer (1934–2023)

- Born: 11 February 1934
- Origin: Ireland
- Died: 22 April 2023 (aged 89)
- Occupations: Composer, Teacher and Pianist

Bernard Geary (11 February 1934 – 22 April 2023) was an Irish composer, teacher and pianist.

== Career ==
Born in Gurranabraher near Cork, Geary was largely self-taught, although he did study at University College Cork from 1952 until 1955, where the professor of music was Aloys Fleischmann. An early influence was the music of Benjamin Britten. His first compositions to attract attention, including the String Quartet No 1 and Provocation for string orchestra, appeared in 1960. Four years later came the first of many orchestral pieces, the Variations on Amran Dochais (Song of Hope), which was first performed at the Gaiety Theatre in Dublin on 9 February 1964 by the RTE Symphony Orchestra.

Geary married Leonora McCarthy in 1962 and there were four children. The family moved from Cork to Dublin in 1970. From 1976 until 1998 Geary was head of music at Cabinteely Community School in the suburbs of Dublin, where he composed dramatic and choral works for the school's orchestra and choir.

Later works include In Praise of a City (1985), revived at the opening gala concert of the Cork International Choral Festival in 2018, The Painted Wood for orchestra (1988), and the large scale choral cantata Sankt Nik'laus Komm in unser Haus (1993). In 1997 a concert of his works was held at the National Concert Hall, Dublin. Recordings of his piano music (played by Anthony Byrne) and choral pieces were issued in 2000.

== Death ==
Geary was survived by his four children. He died aged 89 at St Vincent's Hospital, Dublin. The funeral was held at St Joseph's Church in Glasthule, Dublin on 27 April.

== Selected works ==
Orchestral

- Provocation for string orchestra (1960)
- Variations on Amran Dochais (1964)
- Carol for Orchestra (1971)
- The Banks of the Esk (1971)
- Courtmacsherry Overture (1976)
- Elegy for orchestra (1977)
- Downpatrick Head (1978)
- Reflections on an Irish Carving (1979)
- Divertissement for orchestra (1979)
- Festive Overture (1979)
- Rhapsody for trumpet and orchestra (1980)
- Divertimento for string orchestra (1982)
- The Painted Wood (1988)
- Essay for string orchestra (1989)
- Plearacha for orchestra (2006)

Vocal and choral

- Songs of Wonder (1972) for soprano and orchestra
- The Yeats Cycle for baritone and piano (1972)
- Tryptch for soprano and orchestra (1973)
- Mass of St Finbar for tenor, chorus and organ (1973)
- Mass of St Nessan (1980)
- Canticle for Christmas (1981)
- Éist le fuaim na hAbhann (1981)
- Canticle Mass of St. Francis (1982)
- Time’s Delight for soloist, chorus and orchestra
- In Praise of a City (1985)
- Malachy’s Quest, cantata for soloists, choir and orchestra (1985)
- The Divine Image (1985)
- Slieve na mon for massed choirs and orchestra (1991)
- Sankt Nik’laus Komm in unser Haus (1993), for choir, organ and orchestra
- Liquid Emotion (1996)
- A Dream Garden (1997)
- Ave Verum (2000)
- Dóchas (2000)

Dramatic

- Sauce for the Goose, radio play (1978)
- Julian, radio play (1979)
- St. Patrick was a Gentleman, television documentary (1979)
- The Plaisham, operetta (1980)
- Sarah, one-act opera (Carrolls Theatre, Dublin, 1981)

Ballet

- The Needle Eater (1970)
- Bitter Aloes (1971)
- Il Casone (1971)

Chamber and instrumental

- String Quartet No 1 (1960)
- Two Cameos for piano (1979)
- Wind Quintet (1982)
- Sonatina for piano (1996)
- And Lastly Came Cold February for piano (2000)
- Scherzo for piano (2000)
- String Quartet No 2 (2006)
- Chasing the Tide, recorded by the Carducci String Quartet
- Two Poems for violin and piano
