= Jane O'Leary =

Irish composer of American birth

Jane O'Leary (born 13 October 1946) is an American-born Irish musician and composer who has been living in Ireland since 1972.

== Biography ==
Jane O'Leary (née Strong) was born in Hartford, Connecticut. She graduated summa com laude from Vassar College and studied with Milton Babbitt at Princeton University, where she received a Ph.D. in composition. She lectured at Swarthmore College for a year and moved to Ireland in 1972.

O'Leary's music has been performed internationally at concert venues including, in the U.S., the Kennedy Center, the Lincoln Center, Chicago Cultural Center and Carnegie Hall. She is the founder (in 1976), artistic director and pianist of the ensemble Concorde, which regularly performs contemporary music. In 1981, she was one of the founders of the organisation 'Music for Galway' and served as its chairperson from 1984 to 1992. Other honorary positions included membership of the board of directors of the National Concert Hall, Dublin (1986–1996), member of the Irish Arts Council (1998–2003), chairperson of the Contemporary Music Centre, Dublin, and others. Since 1981 she has been a member of Aosdána, Ireland's academy for creative artists. Since 2006, O'Leary teaches composition at the Dublin Institute of Technology Conservatory of Music and Drama in Dublin. She received the Marten Toonder Award in 1994 and received an honorary doctorate from NUI Galway in 2007.

== Selected compositions ==
Orchestral

- From the flatirons (1985)
- The petals fall (1987)
- Sky of revelation (1989)
- Mirros Imaginings (1991)
- Islands of Discovery (1991)
- Here, There (and Everywhere) (2002)
- Strings alive (2007)

Chamber music

- Quartet (1969) for clarinet, bass clarinet, violin, cello
- Concortet (1979) for flute, violin, cello, harpsichord
- String Quartet (1983)
- Variations (1984) for flute and piano
- Piano Trio (1992)
- Silenzio della terra (1993) for flute and percussion [marimba & tom-toms]
- Duo (1994) for violin and cello
- Mystic Play of Shadows (1995) for string quartet
- Into the Wordless (1998) for flute, clarinet, violin, cello, piano
- Why the Hill Sings (2004) for viola and piano
- In the Stillness of Time (2004) for string quartet
- Piano Quintet (2005)
- Sunshowers (2007) for alto flute, clarinet, violin, cello, piano, percussion
- riverrun (2008) for saxophone quartet
- in a flurry of whispering (2011) for alto flute, clarinet, violin, viola, cello, piano
- the echo of all that's happened (2014) for alto flute, clarinet & string quartet
- The Passing Sound of Forever (2015) for string quartet
- as if one (2016) for viola and cello

Solo instrumental

- Piano Piece I (1974)
- Piano Piece II (1980)
- Reflections (1986) for piano
- Forgotten Worlds (1987) for piano
- Cartoline dalla Sicilia (1987) for piano
- When the Bells Have Stopped Ringing (1989) for piano
- Four Pieces for Guitar (1993)
- Within/Without (2000) for clarinet
- Awakening (2002) for percussion
- Breathing Spaces (2010) for piano
- No. 19, versions for violin (2012) and viola (2013)
- Five Bagatelles (2013) for piano
- A Palette of Preludes (2015) for piano

Vocal

- Poem from a Three-Year Old (1976) for soprano, flute, clarinet
- Three Voices: Lightning, Peace, Grass (1977) for soprano, oboe, piano
- Filled Wine Cup (1982) for mixed choir
- A Woman's Beauty (1991) for speaker, flute, percussion, dancer
- Dream Songs (1996). Two versions, a) for female choir and piano; b) for female choir and small orchestra
- Soundshapes (2006) for voice, alto flute, clarinet, violin
- Clara (2013) for speaker, clarinet, bass-clarinet

== Recordings ==
- Silenzio della Terra, performed by Concorde, on: Contemporary Music from Ireland Vol. 1, Contemporary Music Centre CMC CD01 (CD, 1995).
- Silenzio della Terra, Duo, performed by Concorde, on: Celtic Connections, Capstone Records CPS-8640 (CD, 1997).
- Four Pieces for Guitar, performed by John Feeley, on: e-motion, Black Box Music BBM 1002 (CD, 2008).
- Cartoline dalla Sicilia, performed by Catherine Nardiello (piano), on: Women Composers Vol. I, Catherine Nardiello CN-115 (CD, 2000).
- Within/Without, performed by Paul Roe (clarinet), on: Containers (Galway Arts Festival 2000) (CD, 2000).
- Mystic Play of Shadows, performed by Quartetto Paul Klee, on: Niccolò NIC 1047 (CD, 2001).
- Piano Quartet; a piacere ...; Why the Hill Sings; In the Stillness of Time; something there; Mystic Play of Shadows, performed by ConTempo Quartet, Vanbrugh Quartet, Jane O'Leary (piano), members of Concorde, on: In the Stillness of Time: Music of Jane O'Leary, Capstone Records CPS-8789 (CD, 2007)
- Forgotten Worlds, performed by Isabelle O'Connell (piano), on: Reservoir, Diatribe Solo Series DIACDSOL 001 (CD, 2010).
- a piacere ..., performed by Paul Roe (clarinet), on: Between, Diatribe Solo Series DIACDSOL 002 (CD, 2010).
- Duo, performed by Laura Chislett Jones (flute) and John Feeley (guitar), on: Islands. Contemporary Irish Solo & Instrumental Works for Guitar, Overture Music (no label code) (CD, 2010).
- Reflections II, performed by Concorde, on: Reflections, Navona Records NV 5835 (CD, 2010).
- Forgotten Worlds, performed by Hugh Tinney, on: RTÉ lyric fm CD 153 (CD, 2016).
- A Way Through; No. 19; Murmurs and Echoes; A Winter Sketchbook; ... from hand to hand ...; The Passing Sound of Forever, performed by Andreja Malir (hp), Concorde, RTÉ ConTempo Quartet, on: Navona Records NV 6068 (CD, 2017).

== Bibliography ==
- Axel Klein: Die Musik Irlands im 20. Jahrhundert (Hildesheim: Georg Olms Verlag, 1996)
- Benjamin Dwyer: "An Interview with Jane O'Leary", in: B. Dwyer: Different Voices. Irish Music and Music in Ireland (Hofheim: Wolke Verlag, 2014), p. 112–132.
