= Fanny Arthur Robinson =

English pianist and composer

Fanny Arthur Robinson (September 1831 – 31 October 1879) was an English pianist, music educator and composer who spent most of her career in Dublin, Ireland.

== Biography ==
Fanny Robinson was born in Southampton and studied the piano in London with William Sterndale Bennett and Sigismund Thalberg. She performed in Dublin in February 1849 where she met her future husband Joseph Robinson, conductor, composer and chorister at St. Patrick's Cathedral. They married on 17 July 1849. She appeared as a pianist in London and Paris, and in 1856 made her performing debut in Ireland. She took a teaching position at the Royal Irish Academy of Music in the same year. She remained active as pianist and composer until her early death in Dublin in 1879.

Robinson was one of the few female composers of her time whose music was published and performed. Her cantata God is Love was her most frequently performed work during her lifetime; occasionally, excerpts were performed like anthems in the Dublin cathedrals. Her piano music is typical for the Victorian music of her time: very melodic, simple in its harmonic design, yet attractive and well-written for her instrument. Typically of Victorian times, however, her music was not published as by "Fanny Robinson" but by "Mrs. Joseph Robinson".

Her life was overshadowed by depression, and she took her life at the age of 48.

== Selected compositions ==
- God is Love, cantata for mixed chorus (c.1869)

Piano

- Sentiments (1853)
- The Haymakers. Caprice pastorale (1855)
- A Dream. Melody (1864)
- Constancy. Melody (1864)
- Elf Land. Presto scherzando (1864)
- The Hunt. Morceau de salon (1864)
- The Village Fête. Morceau de salon (1864)
- May Morning. A Sketch (1865)
- Infant Smiles (1868)
- Laughing Water. Rondino (1870)
- Evening Thoughts. Impromptu (1873)
- Hopes and Fears. Allegro brillante (1876)
- The Thrush's Song. Pensée musicale (1877)
- Fête rustique. Morceau du salon (Paris, n.d.)
- Stella. Valse brillante (Dublin, n.d.)
- The Song of the Mill-wheel (London, n.d.)

== Recording ==
- Constancy, performed by Alan Etherden (piano), on: Hunters Moon Promotions HMPCD 0183, CD (1989).

== Bibliography ==
- Caitríona Doran: The Robinsons. A Nineteenth-Century Dublin Family of Musicians and their Contribution towards Musical Life in Dublin (unpublished MA thesis, NUI Maynooth, 1998); see SMI Music Thesis Register.
- Richard Pine: To Talent Alone. The Royal Irish Academy of Music 1848–1998 (Dublin: Gill & Macmillan, 1998), ISBN 0-7171-2759-1.
- Jennifer O'Connor: "Women and Music in Nineteenth-Century Dublin", in: Journal of the International Alliance for Women in Music, 15.1 (Spring 2009), p. 12–17.
