= R. Curt Webb =

American politician (born 1949)

Member of the Utah House of Representatives from the 5th district
- In office January 1, 2009 – October 1, 2018
- Preceded by: Scott L. Wyatt
- Succeeded by: Casey Snider

Member of the Utah House of Representatives from the 5th district
- In office March 3, 2003 – December 31, 2004
- Preceded by: Brent Parker
- Succeeded by: Scott L. Wyatt

Personal details
- Born: October 25, 1949 (age 76) Lehi, Utah
- Party: Republican
- Education: Utah State University

R. Curt Webb (born October 25, 1949, in Lehi, Utah) is an American politician and a former Republican member of the Utah House of Representatives representing District 5 from 2009 to 2018. Webb was non-consecutively a member from his March 3, 2003, appointment to fill the vacancy caused by the resignation of Representative Brent Parker until 31 December 2004. He lives in Providence, UT, with his wife Michaele, and their three children: Nathan, David, and Suzanne.

== Early life and career ==
Webb earned his BA in business management from Utah State University in 1986.

== Political career ==
During the 2016 General Session, Representative Webb served on the Infrastructure and General Government Appropriations Subcommittee, the House Political Subdivisions Committee and the House Business and Labor Committee.

Webb resigned from the Utah House in October 2018 to begin a LDS mission assignment in Hawaii.

== 2016 sponsored legislation ==
Bill Number	Bill Title	Status
HB0017S03	Assessment Area Foreclosure Amendments	Governor signed - 3/22/16
HB0032	Subdivision Base Parcel Tax Amendments	House/ to Governor - 3/17/2016
HB0163S02	Title Insurance Amendments	House/ to Governor - 3/17/2016

Webb passed all of his three bills introduced during the 2016 General Session, giving him a 100% passage rate. He also floor sponsored SB0164S02 Local Government Modifications, SB0180 Optional Tax Increase Amendments, and SB0220S02 Non-judicial Foreclosure Amendments.

== Elections ==
- 2014: Webb was unopposed in the Republican Primary and won the 2014 General election with 6,776 votes (79.68%) against Democratic nominee Jeffrey Turley.
- 2012: Webb was unopposed for the June 26, 2012, Republican Primary and won the November 6, 2012, General election with 11,946 votes (84.3%) against Democratic nominee Al Snyder.
- 2010: Webb was challenged in the June 22, 2010, Republican Primary but won with 2,252 votes (68.4%) and won the November 2, 2010, General election with 7,704 votes (83.7%) against Democratic nominee Paige Pagnucco.
- 2008: When Representative Wyatt left the Legislature and left the seat open, Webb was unopposed for the June 24, 2008, Republican Primary and won the November 4, 2008, General election with 10,245 votes (71.4%) against Democratic nominee Suzanne Marychild, who had been the Democratic nominee for the seat in 2006.
- 2004: Webb was challenged in the June 22, 2004, Republican Primary and lost by 60 votes to Scott L. Wyatt who was elected in the November 2, 2004, General election against Democratic challenger Victor Jensen.
- 2002: Webb challenged incumbent Republican Representative Brent Parker in the June 25, 2002, Republican Primary but lost by 90 votes to Representative Parker, who was re-elected in the November 5, 2002, General election against Democratic challenger Dennis Austin.
