= Guido Papini =

Italian composer

Guido Papini (1 August 1847 – 3 October 1912) was an Italian violinist, composer and teacher. During his career he lived in London and Dublin.

== Life ==
Papini was born in Camaiore in 1847. He studied with Ferdinando Giorgetti in Florence, and gave his first concert there in 1860, playing Louis Spohr's third violin concerto. For several years he was leader of the Società del quartetto in the city; in 1872 and 1874 he took part in concerts of the Società del quartetto di Milano.

From 1874 he lived in London; he took part in the Musical Union concerts of John Ella, playing in string quartets. He was a soloist at concerts of the Philharmonic Society in 1875, 1877, and 1878. In 1876, he appeared in Paris with an orchestra directed by Jules Pasdeloup.

A concert of the Philharmonic Society in 1875 was reviewed:

Vieuxtemps's Adagio and Rondo, from his Concerto in E, were the movements chosen by Signor Papini.... In these selections the Italian artist found excellent opportunity for the disclosure of his undoubtedly fine qualities of tone and executancy. As regards the former, nothing could be more inviting to the ear, because of its silvery richness; while, in all the arts of bravura playing, he was at once clear and articulate....

In 1893, he became violin professor at the Royal Irish Academy of Music in Dublin. He returned to London in 1896 in poor health; he composed and gave private tuition. He was for many years president of the College of Violinists in London and was one of its examiners.

Papini died in London in 1912 and was buried in Highgate Cemetery.

== Compositions ==
Papini's published works include:

- A violin concerto (Milan, 1876) and two cello concertos (Milan, 1874 and London, 1877)
- Transcriptions for violin and piano
- Violin tutors including Il Metodo per violino, reissued as Le Mécanisme du jeune violoniste Op.57 (London, 1883)
- L'Argentine, Op.88
- 6 Characteristic Pieces, Op.100
- Adieux à Naples, Op.27
- 8 morceaux faciles, Op.57
- 3 Pieces, Op.102
- 2 Pieces, Op.205
- Theme and Variations, Op.37
