= Alec O'Leary =

- Born: Alec O'Leary; Carlow, Ireland
- Genres: Classical; Latin American
- Occupations: Musician; Director (Guitar Festival)
- Instrument: Cedar Guitar (2005) by Michael J. O'Leary
- Years active: ???? - present
- Label: GFI Master Records
- Website: Official website

Alec O'Leary (M.Mus., B.Mus., Dip. Inst. Teaching) is the director and founder of the Guitar Festival of Ireland and a renowned Irish guitarist. He has spent many years studying guitar with John Feeley at the DIT Conservatory of Music and Drama, Dublin, and has had tuition from many distinguished players, such as Manuel Barreuco, Roland Dyens, Scott Tennant, Sergio Assad, Elena Papandreou and Fabio Zannon. O'Leary plays regularly both as a soloist and in ensemble and has featured on national radio and television. He plays guitars crafted by the renowned Irish luthier Michael J. O'Leary.

== Debut album ==
Alec released his debut album Milonga in the Summer of 2008, on GFI Masters Records. It is a solo album inspired by the music of Latin American composers and features the music of Roland Dyens, Antonio Lauro, Ástor Piazzolla, Jorge Morel, Jorge Cardoso and Antonio Carlos Jobim.

== Discography ==
- 2008: Milonga - inspiration from Latin America
