= Joseph Robinson (composer) =

Irish composer, singer and conductor

Joseph Robinson (16 August 1815 – 23 August 1898) was an Irish composer, baritone, conductor, and teacher.

== Biography ==
Joseph Robinson was the youngest son of Francis Robinson senior, a "writing master" at Christ Church Cathedral, Dublin, and a founding member of the Philharmonic Society, Dublin. Joseph was a chorister at St Patrick's Cathedral, Dublin, between 1823 and 1831. When his voice broke, he succeeded his brother John (1810–1844) as organist of Sandford Church, Dublin. He was a vicar choral (singer) at Christ Church (1836–43) and St Patrick's (1843–8 and again 1854–6). Together with his three brothers Francis junior (c.1799–1872), William (1805–1881), and John (1810–1844) they were known as "the four wonderful brothers", frequently performing glees and partsongs as a vocal quartet.

In 1834, Robinson founded the Antient Concerts Society, a private choral society that grew to become Dublin's leading orchestral and choral society and the "hub of Dublin's musical life" in the mid-19th century and conducted it until 1862. Later he also conducted the University of Dublin Choral Society (1876–88) and the Philharmonic Society. At a performance of Felix Mendelssohn-Bartholdy's oratorio Elijah at Birmingham in August 1846, Robinson (successfully) asked Mendelssohn to orchestrate the accompaniment of his Hear my Prayer for performance by the Antient Concerts Society. He married the English pianist Fanny Arthur (1831–1879; later known as "Mrs Joseph Robinson" or Fanny Robinson) in 1849, and their house at 3 Upper Fitzwilliam Street became a centre for visiting international musicians, including Joseph Joachim. He liked conducting at massive choral and orchestral occasions such as the 1852 Cork Industrial Exhibition, the 1853 Great Industrial Exhibition in Dublin, the 1865 Dublin International Exhibition of Fine Arts and Manufactures, and the centenaries of Daniel O'Connell (1875) and Thomas Moore (1879).

Robinson was a co-founder of the Royal Irish Academy of Music in 1848 and professor of singing there (1856–75, and again from 1887), also conducting choral and orchestral classes, and a vice-president of the institution's Board of Studies, 1892–6. Charles Villiers Stanford was his most prominent (private) pupil.

His busy teaching and conducting schedule left comparatively little time for composition. Two evening services and some anthems constitute his religious music, and there are also a number of songs and arrangements of Irish folk songs, the latter particularly lauded by Stanford. He twice declined the conferment of a "Doctor of Music" (MusD) title from Trinity College Dublin, preferring to be known as "Joe Robinson".

== Selected compositions ==
Church music

- Bow Down Thine Ear O Lord, anthem (1853)
- Magnificat and Nunc dimittis (1867, published 1895)
- Not unto Us O Lord, anthem (1869)
- Glory to God on High, service in D major (1895)

Piano music

- The Aztec's Polka (1853)
- The Magnolia, polka (1855)
- The Coronella, polka (1855)
- The Evening Star, polka (1857)
- The Little Brook's Song, melody (1866)
- Nocturne (1871)
- Etude (1872)

Songs

- Oh Tell Me Father Why You Weep (1845)
- In Dreams When Sleep Falls o'er Me (1853)
- Spring is Coming (1853)
- Tears and Smiles (1858)
- May Song (1859)
- The Lost Chord (1864)
- Christmas Morn (1866)
- Rest Song (1870)
- The Loss of the Cornwall (1872)
- I Wish I Were on Yonder Hill (1874)

Partsongs

- Voices of the Dead (c.1855)
- When Cold in the Earth (1856)
- Eventide (1860)
- Sylvan Hours (1863)
- A May Carol (1871)
- Balmy Night (published 1900)

Irish folksong arrangements

- Irish Melodies, new arrangements for voice and piano of Moore's Melodies (c.1863)
- My Gentle Harp for four voices (c.1863)
- Six Irish Melodies for voice and piano (c.1865)
- The Golden Star for voice and piano (1870)
- The Snowy-Breasted Pearl for voice and piano (1888)

As editor

- Sacred Music of Sir John Stevenson (Dublin, c.1840; 2nd ed. c.1857)
- Hymns as Used in Dublin Churches, ed. with his brothers Francis junior and John (Dublin, c.1858)
- Improved Instructions for the Harmonium with a Selection of Exercises (Dublin, 1859)
- The Organist's Friend. Collection of Voluntaries etc. (Dublin, 1859–77, 1880)
- The Choralist, ed. with Francis Robinson jr (Dublin, c.1865)

== Bibliography ==
- "Obituary: Joseph Robinson", in: The Musical Times 39 (September 1898).
- Charles Villiers Stanford: chapter "Joseph Robinson" in Studies and Memories (London: Archibald Constable & Co., 1908), p. 117–27.
- W.H. Grindle: Irish Cathedral Music (Belfast: Institute of Irish Studies, 1989).
- Barra Boydell: A History of Music at Christ Church Cathedral, Dublin (Woodbridge: Boydell Press, 2004).
