= Brent Parker =

American politician (born 1945)

Member of the Utah House of Representatives from the 5th district
- In office 2000 – February 28, 2003
- Preceded by: Evan Olsen
- Succeeded by: R. Curt Webb

Personal details
- Born: March 7, 1945 (age 81) Logan, Utah, U.S.
- Party: Republican
- Spouse: Sharon Z. Parker
- Children: six
- Education: Utah State University
- Profession: farmer

Brent D. Parker (born March 7, 1945) is an American former politician in the state of Utah. He is a dairy farmer from Wellsville, Utah and served in the Utah House of Representatives from 2000 to 2003, sitting as a Republican.

Parker was arrested and charged with soliciting sex from an undercover male police officer in Salt Lake City in February 2003. He pled guilty and resigned.
