= Havelock Nelson =

Irish composer and conductor

Havelock Nelson (25 May 1917 – 5 August 1996) was an Irish composer and conductor.

== Life ==
Nelson was born in Cork and studied in Dublin with Dina Copeman and Dorothy Stokes at the Royal Irish Academy of Music, organ with George Hewson and composition with John F. Larchet. He read medical studies and music at Trinity College Dublin (TCD) and followed his first degree with doctoral research in bacteriology, completed in 1941. He was co-founder, in 1939, of the Dublin Orchestral Players. In 1950 he obtained a doctorate in music from TCD. In 1947, he joined the BBC in Belfast. He conducted the BBC Northern Ireland Orchestra, also the Studio Symphony Orchestra and the Ulster Singers. On his retirement in 1977 he went to Trinidad to direct a local opera company. Nelson died in Belfast.

== Music ==
Nelson's compositions were legion and included orchestral works, a ballet, a choral suite and many partsongs, anthems and (particularly) unison songs, song cycles and other solo songs (like Dirty Work and Love is Cruel), piano pieces including the Three Irish Diversions, instrumental works like Cameos for clarinet solo, incidental music for films and radio and TV plays, and many arrangements of Irish and other folksongs. He also made several LP recordings. Among the more popular of his published miniatures are nursery rhymes in the styles of Mendelssohn and Rossini.

== Bibliography ==
- Havelock Nelson: A Bank of Violets. The Musical Memoirs of Havelock Nelson, foreword by James Galway (Belfast: Greystone Books, 1993), ISBN 1-870157-10-9.
- Alasdair Jamieson: Music in Northern Ireland. Two Major Figures: Havelock Nelson (1917–1996) and Joan Trimble (1915–2000) (Tolworth, Surrey: Grosvenor House Publishing, 2017), ISBN 978-1-78623-977-8.
