= Slow air =

Musical genre

A slow air is a type of tune in Irish traditional music, marked by the absence of strict metre or structure, melodically "open ended" and generally derived from the melody of a sung song but instead played on a solo melodic instrument. The melodies are often drawn from the sean-nós solo singing tradition.
