= Andrea Postacchini =

Italian violin maker

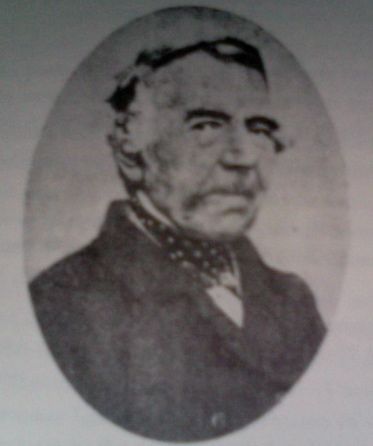
Postacchini circa 1850s

Andrea Postacchini (November 30, 1781 - February 3, 1862) was an Italian violin maker born in Fermo, known as "Stradivari of the Marches" (a region of central Italy).

== Early life ==
Postacchini was born on 30 December 1781 in Fermo, a hilltop town near the east coast in Italy's Marches region. He came from a wealthy, religious family of farm workers.

== Career ==
After the death of his father, Postacchini was sent to a monastery in Fermo, where he met a priest who made violins using primitive tools. Postacchini became fascinated with this craft, and upon his departure at the age of 28, he decided to become luthier. Although he was self-taught, Postacchini produced many fine instruments, all with elegant archings. His output was diverse and included not only bowed-string instruments but also guitars and bows. The tonal quality of Postacchini's wood was excellent.

During his lifetime, Postacchini received acclaim at exhibitions and fairs. At an exhibition in Fermo in 1869, his work was acknowledged as a unique continuation in direction and style of Antonio Stradivari, which gained him the title "Stradivari of the Marches".

Raphaele (1823–1892) was Andrea's son and pupil.

== Death ==
Postacchini spent his life in Fermo and died there on 3 February 1862, age 76.

== Legacy ==
Since 1993, the international violin competition known as the "Andrea Postacchini" is organized in Fermo.

== Quotes ==
International Violin Competition "Andrea Postacchini" celebrates the luthier. He worked in the workshop at number 3 of via delle Vergini, making refined instruments both for their esthetical beauty and the characteristics of their sound: soft, round but at the same time potent and selective. Qualities much valued by soloists at his times as well as nowadays. The original label that Postacchini applied to his late works, the most appreciated and valuable, bring the wording "Andrea Postacchini Firmanus fecit sub titulo S. Raphaelis Arcang. 18..".

Like those of Stradivarius, some of Postacchini's techniques and "secrets", making his works inimitable, are still ignored. We refer in particular to the original elastic varnishes, of beautiful brown-red and gold-yellow colours and still in perfect conditions after 150 year, whose formula has gone with him to the grave." - Carmela Marani, journalist.

"He learned his first violin making rudiments from an unknown friar and was then destined to priesthood. His ecclesiastic carrier was interrupted by the Napoleonic turmoil. In 1815 he was already "an outstanding maker of string instruments", in 1824 he signed a violin as his own work nr. 214. In Fermo he made string instruments, guitars, bows and also restored them. His production was characterized by the accurate choice of woods, elegance of curves and fine varnishes he used, typically gold-yellow or brown-red. This built his reputation as an excellent violin maker when he was still living; his works, much appreciated for their beautiful sound, soon commanded high prices and were traded all over Europe. His late production bears the label "Andreas Postacchini Firmanus fecit sub titulo S. Raphaelis Arcang. 18..". After his death in Fermo, on February 3, 1862, Postacchini was named "Stradivari of the Marches". He is nowadays considered as a top class Italian violin maker of the 19th century.

In his late work, Postacchini used "generous proportions, very slight gradient, deepish ribs, deep cherry red varnish with a touch of brown impregnating through, elastic and as smooth as foulard. Most skillful modeling with no imperfections to be criticised by the keenest eyes. Players fastidious in tonal matters should welcome these superb violins as an invaluable economy of time when assiduously practicing for rapid fingering clarity." - William Henley
