= Benjamin Dwyer =

Irish composer, guitarist and musicologist (born 1965)

- Born: 3 August 1965 (age 60); Dublin, Ireland
- Occupations: Composer, guitarist and musicologist

Benjamin Dwyer (born 3 August 1965) is an Irish composer, guitarist and musicologist.

== Life ==
Dwyer was born in Dublin and studied the classical guitar at the DIT Conservatory of Music and Drama, Dublin, and at the Royal Academy of Music, London. He also studied music at Trinity College Dublin, and in 2000 he received a PhD in composition from Queen's University Belfast.

As a guitarist, he made his concerto debut with Rodrigo's Concierto d'Aranjuez with the Neubrandenburg Philharmonic Orchestra in Germany; since then he has performed as soloist with most of the major Irish orchestras and string quartets, and he has given recitals throughout Europe and North America. He has also performed with a variety of chamber music partners, including tenor John Elwes, saxophonist Kenneth Edge, flautist Susan Doyle, jazz guitarist Mike Nielsen and classical guitarist Dario Macaluso. Dwyer spent the years 2002 to 2007 in Spain (Andalusia and Barcelona), before returning to Ireland, where he has taught guitar at the Royal Irish Academy of Music since 2009. Since 2012 he holds the first professorship in music at Middlesex University.

Dwyer has a strong interest in contemporary art music. He has been involved in the promotion and performance of new music in Ireland since 1990, when he instituted the "Mostly Modern" series and festival (later known as "MUSIC21"), and he is the founder and director of the VOX21 new music ensemble, which premiered many new works by Irish and international composers. He has also been active as artistic director and organiser of concert series and festivals, bringing tailored events to the National Concert Hall and Sligo Contemporary Music Festival. Dwyer also curated "Remembering Ligeti" in 2007 and "Remembering Britten" in 2013 in Dublin.

He was awarded the Villa-Lobos Centenary Medal by the Brazilian Government in 1987, elected to Aosdána in 2006, and made an Associate of the Royal Academy of Music, London, in 2009.

As a musicologist, Dwyer has published monographs and written articles for the Journal of Music in Ireland.

== Music ==
Among Irish composers, Benjamin Dwyer has made one of the largest and most sustained contributions to the repertoire of classical guitar. His Twelve Études, composed over a period of twelve years and completed in 2008, comprise the summation of his writing to date for the instrument. His treatment of melodic cells, exploring and reshaping their musical potential by increments, and avoiding the traditional development, can give his musical language the appearance of being extemporised. Dwyer also makes frequent use of rhythmic ostinati, as in Voces críticas (2004), the Guitar Quintet (2003) and several of the Études.

Often in his music, conflicting ideas result not in resolution but in mutual annihilation, a process seen clearly in his Concerto for Percussion and Orchestra (2000), which illustrates the universal forces of creation (Rajas), preservation (Sattva) and destruction (Tamas) described in the Indian Vedic traditions. This piece also demonstrates Dwyer's fascination with Hindu philosophy and other ritual and mythopoetic ideas.

== List of works ==
Works for or including guitar

- Sonata for Oboe and Guitar (1994)
- Sonata for Flute and Guitar (1994; rev. 1997)
- Sonata for Tenor Recorder and Guitar (1994; rev. 1997)
- Omeros (1994, rev. 2004), for four amplified guitars
- Song for Her (Canción para Ella) (1995), also versions for 2 guitars, soprano saxophone and guitar, and flute and guitar
- Canción y Tango (1995; rev. 2003), also versions for soprano saxophone and guitar, flute and guitar
- Guitar Quintet (2003) for guitar and string quartet
- Concerto No. 1 for Guitar and Strings (1998; rev. 2008)
- Voces Críticas (2004)
- Apuntes sin títulos I-IV (2005)
- Líneas (2005), for violin and 8-string guitar
- Tango para dos (2005), for 2 guitars
- Concerto No. 2 for Guitar and Orchestra (2007)
- Twelve Études (2008)
- Twelve Studies (2008; rev. 2012)
- Eight Simple Studies (2008; rev. 2012)
- Dos estudios avanzados (2008; rev. 2012)

Works for piano

- Homenaje a Maurice Ohana (1997; rev. 2006)
- Quasi una fantasia (1997; rev. 2006)
- Apuntes (2002)
- Sueños Lentos (Slow Dreams) [Portrait] (2009)
- Étude (2013)

Other orchestral music

- Concerto for Percussion and Orchestra: Rajas, Sattva, Tamas (2000)
- In Memoriam Maharishi Mahesh Yogi (2009)

Other chamber music

- Tiento (1994), for soprano saxophone and piano
- Soneto del Amor Oscuro (1995), for oboe and percussion
- Parallaxis (1996), for soprano saxophone and tenor saxophone
- Soneto del Amor Oscuro (1996; rev. 2011), for flute (doubling alto and sliding flutes) and percussion
- Quasi una fantasia (1998), for clarinet (or soprano saxophone), violin, piano
- Piano Trio I: Quasi una fantasia (1998), for violin, cello, piano
- Crow (1999), for amplified tenor recorder and tape; versions for amplified flute (doubling piccolo) and tape (1999); amplified flute (with sliding head-joint) and tape (2010)
- Crow's Vanity (2000), for amplified cello and tape
- Afterjoyce I (2004), for flute, percussion and live electronics
- Movimientos I-IV (2007), for violin and piano
- Al-Andalus (2005), for flute (doubling bass flute), clarinet (doubling bass clarinet), accordion, violin, cello, percussion
- Piano Trio II (2007)
- Night Words (2007), for accordion and bass clarinet
- Passacaille (2009), for baroque violin and harpsichord
- Four Japanese Prints (2009), for amplified bass flute, alto flute, flute, piccolo (one player), amplified piano
- Umbilical (2011), for baroque violin, double bass, harpsichord, tape, with optional Butoh dancer
- imagines obesae et aspectui ingratae (2013, for viola solo
- ouissance... (2013), for shakuhachi solo
- Nocturnal, after Benjamin Britten (2015), for piano trio

Vocal

- Two Mahon Songs (Derek Mahon) (1994; rev. 1995), for high voice and cello (version for mezzo and cello)
- In Memoriam (1995), for female choir
- Scenes from Crow (2009), for amplified mixed ensemble, soprano, tape

== Musicological publications ==
- "Transformational Ostinati in György Ligeti's Sonatas for Solo Cello and Solo Viola", in: Louise Duchesneau and Wolfgang Marx (eds.): György Ligeti. Of Foreign Lands and Strange Sounds (Martlesham, Suffolk: Boydell & Brewer, 2011).
- Constellations. The Life and Music of John Buckley (Dublin: Carysfort Press, 2011); ISBN 978-1-904505-52-5.
- Different Voices: Irish Music and Music in Ireland (Hofheim: Wolke Verlag, 2014); ISBN 978-3-95593-060-8.
- Britten and the Guitar. Critical Perspectives for Performers (Dublin: Carysfort Press, 2016); ISBN 978-1-909325-87-6.

== Recordings ==
- In the Ranelagh Gardens, with Macdara Woods (poetry), Benjamin Dwyer (guitar), Kenneth Edge (saxophones), Susan Doyle (flutes) (Gamelan Productions, CD 2005). Contains: Apuntes sin títulos I-IV; Afterjoyce I; Parallaxes; Crow.
- Evolution (Benjamin Dwyer & Mike Nielsen) (Gamelan Productions GAM 0002, CD 2005)
- Benjamin Dwyer: Twelve Études for Guitar (Gamelan Productions GAM 0004, CD 2008)
- Crow, performed by William Dowdall (flute), on: Atoll ACD 111, CD 2010
- Irish Guitar Works, performed by Benjamin Dwyer and the Callino Quartet (El Cortijo 00010, CD 2012). Contains Dwyer's Twelve Studies and Guitar Quintet, plus John Buckley's Guitar Sonata No. 1.
- Benjamin Dwyer: Scenes from Crow, performed by VOX21 (Diatribe Records DIA CD 017, CD 2014)
- Homenaje a Maurice Ohana for piano, performed by Mary Dullea (Métier Records MSV 28549, CD 2014)
