= Dublin Orchestral Players =

Irish amateur orchestra

The Dublin Orchestral Players (DOP) is the longest established amateur orchestra in Dublin, Ireland, having been founded in 1939.

== History ==
In late 1939, Irish composer Havelock Nelson was instrumental in founding the Dublin Junior Orchestra with a view to providing young players of classical music with the opportunity to gain orchestral experience. It gave its first concert on 5 June 1940 in the Abbey Lecture Hall. The orchestra grew rapidly under Nelson and adopted the name Dublin Orchestral Players for its second concert the following year. When Nelson left Dublin in 1943, Brian Boydell became permanent honorary conductor, a position he held until 1966. Fred O'Callaghan conducted the orchestra between 1967 and 1971. Thereafter the orchestra adopted a policy of offering opportunities for a wider range of younger conductors, but O'Callaghan frequently returned to conduct individual concerts up until 1995. Other conductors have included Robert Houlihan, David Carmody, and Fergus Sheil. Since then, principal conductors have been David Brophy (1998–2001), Adele O'Dwyer (2001), Cathal Garvey (2002–2006), and Ciaran Crilly (since 2007).

== Role in Irish musical life ==
During the 1940s, before the establishment of the Radio Éireann Symphony Orchestra (RÉSO), the DOP supplied the demand in Dublin for symphonic music at a time when few orchestral concerts were otherwise available. The orchestra gave the Dublin premières of many standard classics, including Bach's Brandenburg Concerto No. 5 and Mozart's Bassoon Concerto (both in 1944) and, remarkably, the first concert performance outside Russia of Prokofiev's Peter and the Wolf (9 June 1942). Under Boydell's direction the DOP had a policy of promoting music by contemporary Irish composers. For many years the orchestra included an Irish work in every programme and featured a number of premières of Irish compositions including works by Boydell. The DOP has also provided opportunities to launch young solo performers, as when Hugh Maguire made his first public solo appearance on 16 June 1949. The enlargement of the RÉSO in 1948 replaced the DOP's pre-eminent role in providing orchestral concerts with those of a professional standard, and the founding of other amateur orchestras during the later twentieth century complemented and developed its work. The DOP regularly gives three concerts annually in Dublin and occasionally performs outside the capital. It also pioneered bringing orchestral music to schools in the provinces.
