= Brian Boydell =

Irish composer and musicologist

- Born: 17 March 1917; Howth, Ireland
- Died: 8 November 2000 (aged 83); Howth
- Occupations: Composer, conductor, musicologist, educator
- Era: 20th century
- Known for: Co-founded the Music Association of Ireland
- Spouse: Mary Jones (m. 1944)

Brian Patrick Boydell (17 March 1917 – 8 November 2000) was an Irish composer whose works include orchestral pieces, chamber music, and songs. He was Professor of Music at Trinity College Dublin for 20 years, founder of the Dowland Consort, conductor of the Dublin Orchestral Players, and a broadcaster and writer on musical matters. He was also a musicologist specialising in 18th-century Irish musical history.

== Early life and education ==
Boydell was born in Howth, County Dublin, into an Anglo-Irish family. His father James ran the family maltings business while his mother, Eileen Collins, was one of the first women graduates of Trinity College.

Following their son's birth, the Boydells moved from Howth and lived in a succession of rented houses before settling in Shankill, County Dublin. The young Boydell began his formal education at Monkstown Park in Dublin and was subsequently sent to the Dragon School at Oxford. From there he went to Rugby, where he came under the influence of Kenneth Stubbs, the music master. Although Boydell later spoke of his resentment at the anti-Irish attitude he experienced at Rugby, he said "the education there was very good, in science and music."

Having completed his secondary education, Boydell spent the summer of 1935 developing his musical knowledge at Heidelberg, where he wrote his first songs and also studied organ. He won a choral scholarship to Clare College, Cambridge, where he studied natural science, graduating in 1938 with a first-class degree.

Following his graduation, he entered the Royal College of Music where he studied composition under Patrick Hadley, Herbert Howells, and Vaughan Williams. Boydell also became a oboe player during this time.

Upon the outbreak of World War II, Boydell returned to Dublin and achieved further academic success in 1942 with a Bachelor of Music degree from Trinity College. He also took further lessons in composition from John F. Larchet.

== Career ==
Boydell worked briefly as a research scientist, Boydell plunged himself into Dublin's classical musical scene. In 1942, he succeeded Havelock Nelson as conductor of the Dublin Orchestral Players, beginning an association with the amateur orchestra that would endure for a quarter of a century. In 1944 he was appointed Professor of Singing at the Royal Irish Academy of Music, a position he held for eight years. Along with fellow composers Edgar M. Deale, Aloys Fleischmann, and Frederick May he founded the Music Association of Ireland in 1948 as a vehicle to promote classical music throughout the country.

Boydell's interest in Renaissance music, in particular the madrigal, led in 1959 to founding the Dowland Consort, a vocal ensemble with which he performed for many years and recorded an LP. In 1962, having obtained a Doctorate in Music, he was appointed Professor of Music at Trinity College, a post which he would hold for 20 years. and immediately revamped the course making it more relevant to the second half of the twentieth century. From 1961 to 1983, Boydell was a member of the Arts Council.

His programmes on the history and performance of music, first on RTÉ Radio and later on Telefís Éireann, were for many people their introduction to classical music.

Boydell had many interests beyond music. As a surrealist painter in the 1940s (he took lessons from Mainie Jellett), he was a member of The White Stag group. He was also passionate about cars and photography.

== Later life and death ==
Following retirement from Trinity as Fellow Emeritus. Boydell devoted himself to musical scholarship, writing two books on the music of 18th century Dublin. He also contributed to the New Grove Dictionary of Music and Musicians.

Brian Boydell died at his home in Howth at the age of 83 in the company of his wife of 56 years, Mary (née Jones) and their sons, Cormac and Barra. A third son, Marnac, predeceased him.

== Music ==
As a young composer, Boydell was influenced by the music of Delius, Bartók, and Sibelius. He wanted to write modern Irish music that followed the European tradition. However, he also tried to avoid the temptation to incorporate folk tunes into his work to give it a distinctive national identity.

His first major success came in 1948 with In Memoriam Mahatma Gandhi, Op. 30, a 12-minute orchestral piece written in tribute to the recently assassinated Indian leader whom Boydell admired. The composer conducted the Radio Éireann Symphony Orchestra at its premiere in the Phoenix Hall, Dublin. His first String Quartet, Op. 31, composed in 1949, won the Radio Éireann Chamber Music Prize.

Boydell arranged an orchestral version of Amhrán na bhFiann for RTÉ for the launch of their television service in 1961, which was played daily at the end of broadcasting for many years.

Over the course of the next five decades, Boydell produced a great variety of music, ranging from orchestral works such as his Violin Concerto, Op. 36 and Masai Mara, Op. 87 to more intimate compositions for voice or solo instruments. An example of the latter is his piece for harp A Pack of Fancies for a Travelling Harper, Op. 66, premiered at the Dublin Festival of Twentieth Century Music in 1971.

His final work, a short composition for brass band entitled Viking Lip-Music, Op. 91, was given its premiere by the Royal Danish Brass Ensemble at the Drogheda Arts Centre in November 1996 with the composer in attendance.

In his later years, Boydell viewed his place in the greater world of late twentieth-century music with a certain wry detachment.

"I've now become something of an old fogey, but in the 1940s I was regarded as the naughty boy of frightfully modern music."

== Honours received ==
Boydell was awarded several honorary titles in recognition of his services to music, including the Honorary Doctorate of Music from the National University of Ireland (1974); the Order of Merit of the Italian Republic ("Commendatore della Repubblica Italiana") (1983); the election to Aosdána, Ireland's academy of creative artists (1984); and Honorary Fellowship of the Royal Irish Academy of Music (1990).

== Selected works ==
Orchestral

- Pregaria a la Verge del Remei, Op. 14 (1941; rev. 1945) for string orchestra
- The Strings are False, Op. 16 (1942)
- Laïsh, Op. 17 (1942)
- Symphony for Strings, Op. 26 (1945; rev. 1946) for string orchestra
- Magh Sleacht, Op. 29 (1947)
- In memoriam Mahatma Gandhi, Op. 30 (1948)
- Ballet Suite: The Buried Moon, Op. 32a (1949)
- Violin Concerto, Op. 36 (1953; rev. 1954)
- The Wooing of Etain, Op. 37a and Op. 37b (two suites, based on the incidental music to the play by Padraic Fallon, 1954)
- Megalithic Ritual Dances, Op. 39 (1956)
- Meditation & Fugue, Op. 40 (1956; rev. 1957)
- Elegy and Capriccio, Op. 42 (1956) for clarinet and string orchestra
- Ceol cas corach, Op. 46 (1958)
- Shielmartin Suite, Op. 47 (1959)
- Richard's Riot, Op. 51 (1961) for percussion and orchestra
- Symphonic Inscapes, Op. 64 (1968)
- Jubilee Music, Op. 73 (1976)
- Partita Concertante, Op. 75 (1978)
- A Wild Dance for Ceol Chumann na nÓg, Op. 78 (1982)
- Masai Mara, Op. 87 (1988)

Cantatas

- Hearing of Harvests, Op. 13 (W.H. Auden) (1940) for baritone, mixed chorus and orchestra
- Five Joyce Songs, Op. 28a (1946; rev. 1948) for baritone, mixed chorus and orchestra
- The Deer's Cry, Op. 43 (Thomas Kinsella) (1957) for baritone and orchestra
- Mors et vita, Op. 50 (William Dunbar and anonymous writers) (1961) for soprano, tenor, bass, mixed chorus and orchestra
- A Terrible Beauty is Born, Op. 59 (W.B. Yeats, Francis Ledwidge, Thomas MacDonagh, AE, George Sigerson, Tom Kettle) (1965) for narrator, soprano, alto, bass, mixed chorus and orchestra
- Four Yeats Poems, Op. 56 (1966) for soprano and orchestra
- The Carlow Cantata (or, The Female Friend), Op. 83 (various authors) (1984) for soprano, tenor, bass, mixed chorus and orchestra
- Under No Circumstances: An Historical Entertainment, Op. 85 (1987) for narrator, tenor, baritone, mixed chorus and orchestra

Chamber music

- Oboe Quintet, Op. 11 (1940)
- String Trio, Op. 21 (1944)
- Sonata for Cello & Piano, Op. 24 (1945)
- String Quartet No. 1, Op.31 (1949)
- Elegy, Op. 42a (1956) for 2 violins (or violin, clarinet) and piano
- String Quartet No. 2, Op. 44 (1957)
- Quintet for Flute, Harp and Strings, Op. 49 (1960; rev. 1966 & 1980)
- Four Sketches for Two Irish Harps, Op. 52 (1962)
- String Quartet No. 3, Op. 65 (1969)
- Five Mosaics, Op. 69 (1972) for violin and harp or piano
- Fred's Frolic, Op. 74a (1977) for piano 4-hands
- Confrontations in a Cathedral [no op. number] (1986) for organ, harp, percussion
- Adagio and Scherzo for String Quartet, Op. 89 (1991)

Piano music

- Nine Variations on 'The Snowy Breasted Pearl' (1935)
- Berceuse for a Young Pianist, Op. 20 (1943)
- Suite: Naughty Children, Op. 27 (1945), incl. Sleeping Leprechaun, Op. 27a
- Dance for an Ancient Ritual, Op. 39a (1959)
- Capriccio, Op. 48, (1959)
- Sarabande, Op. 53 (1963)
- The Maiden and the Seven Devils, Op. 90 (1992)

Other solo instrumental

- A Pack of Fancies for a Travelling Harper, Op. 66 (1970) for harp
- Three Pieces for Guitar, Op. 70 (1973)
- An Album of Pieces for the Irish Harp, Op. 88 (1989)

Choral

- An Easter Carol (anonymous), Op.12 (1940) for soprano, tenor, bass, mixed chorus
- Shatter Me Music, Op. 33 (Rainer Maria Rilke, trans. J.B. Leishman) (1952) for mixed voice choir
- The Owl and the Pussy Cat, Op. 34 (Edward Lear) (1952) for vocal quartet
- Noël, Op. 41 (1956), 2 descant rec, 2trvv, str orch, or org;
- Two Madrigals, Op. 54 (John Fletcher, George Wither) (1964) for mixed voice choir
- Three Madrigals, Op. 60 (Philip Sydney and anonymous writers) (1967) for mixed voice choir
- Mouth Music for Ten Voices, Op. 72 (1974) for mixed voice choir
- The Small Bell, Op. 76 (1980) for mixed voice choir, flute, harp, string quartet
- I Will Hear What God the Lord Will Speak, Op. 86 (Psalm 85) (1988) for mixed voice choir and organ

Songs (for voice and piano if not mentioned otherwise)

- Wild Geese, Op. 1 (P.H.B. Lyon) (1935)
- Rushlights, O. 3 (anonymous) (1935)
- Cathleen, the Daughter of Hoolihan, Op. 4 (W.B. Yeats) (1936)
- She Weeps over Rahoon, Op. 5 (James Joyce) (1936)
- Watching the Needleboats at San Sabba (James Joyce) (1936; rev. 1937)
- The Witch, Op. 6 (W.B. Yeats) (1938)
- Alone, Op. 15 (James Joyce) (1941)
- The Feather of Death, Op. 22 (Thurloe Connolly) (1943) for baritone, flute, violin, viola, cello
- Sleep Now, Op. 23 (James Joyce) (1944) for soprano, oboe or violin, string orchestra
- Five Joyce Songs, Op. 28 (1946)
- Because Your Voice Was at My Side, Op. 25 (James Joyce) (1948) for voice and pf (or oboe d'amore, violin, viola, cello
- Three Yeats Songs, Op. 56a (1965) for soprano and Irish harp
- Two Yeats Songs (1966)
- In memoriam Thomas McDonagh, Op. 59a (Francis Ledwidge) (1966)

== Selected writings ==
- "Music in Ireland", in: The Bell 14.1 (1947), p. 16–20.
- "Culture and Chauvinism", in: Envoy 2 (May 1950), p. 75–9.
- "The Future of Music in Ireland", in: The Bell 16.4 (1951), p. 21–9.
- "The Dublin Musical Scene 1749–50 and Its Background", in: Proceedings of the Royal Musical Association 105 (1978–9), p. 77–89.
- (ed.): Four Centuries of Music in Ireland (London: BBC, 1979).
- "Half a Century of Music in Dublin", in: Dublin Historical Record 37.3 & 4 (1984), p. 117–21.
- "Georgian Lollipops, or The Lighter Side of Classical Music", in: Popular Music in Eighteenth-Century Dublin, ed. Shields (Dublin: Folk Music Society of Ireland, 1985), p. 5–11.
- "Music before 1700" and "Music 1700–1850", in: A New History of Ireland vol. 4, ed. Moody & Vaughan (Oxford, 1986), p. 542–67 and 568–628.
- A Dublin Musical Calendar, 1700–60 (Dublin: Irish Academic Press, 1988), ISBN 978-0-7165-2430-4.
- Rotunda Music in Eighteenth-Century Dublin (Dublin: Irish Academic Press, 1992), ISBN 978-0-7165-2487-8.

== Recordings ==
For a full discography see here.

- Ceathrar: Contemporary Irish String Quartets, features String Quartet No. 2, Op. 44. Performed by Vanbrugh Quartet, on: Chandos CHAN 9295 (CD, 1994).
- Brian Boydell. Orchestral Music, features In memoriam Mahatma Gandhi, Op. 30; Violin Concerto, Op. 36; Megalithic Ritual Dances, Op. 39; Masai Mara, Op. 87. Performed by RTÉ National Symphony Orchestra of Ireland, Colman Pearce (cond.), on: Marco Polo 8.223887 (CD, 1997).
- British Brass Connection, features Viking Lip-Music, Op. 91. Performed by Royal Danish Brass, on: Rondo Grammofon 8358 (CD, 1997).
- E-motion, features Three Pieces for Guitar, Op. 70. Performed by John Feeley (guitar), on: Black Box Music 1002 (CD, 1998).
- In Blue Sea or Sky, features A Pack of Fancies for a Travelling Harper, Op. 66. Performed by Cliona Doris (harp) on: Riverrun RRCD59 (CD, 2003).
- John Finucane: Clarinet Variations, features Elegy and Capriccio, Op. 42. Performed by John Finucane (clarinet), RTÉ National Symphony Orchestra of Ireland, Robert Houlihan (cond.), on: RTÉ Lyric fm CD 124 (CD, 2009).
- Brian Boydell: The Complete String Quartets, features String Quartet No. 1, Op. 31; String Quartet No. 2, Op. 44; String Quartet No. 3, Op. 65; Adagio and Scherzo, Op. 89. Performed by Carducci Quartet, on: Carducci Classics CSQ 8841 (CD, 2010).
- Heavenly harps, heavenly cloths. Contemporary music for the Irish harp by Brian Boydell, features Four Sketches for Two Irish Harps, Op. 52; Three Yeats Songs, Op. 56a; An Album of Pieces for the Irish Harp, Op. 88. Performed by Mary Louise and Teresa O'Donnell, no label (CD 2020).

== Bibliography ==
- Charles Acton: "Interview with Brian Boydell", in: Éire-Ireland 5:4 (1970), p. 97–111.
- Axel Klein: Die Musik Irlands im 20. Jahrhundert (Hildesheim: Georg Olms Verlag, 1996).
- Gareth Cox: "Octatonicism in the String Quartets of Brian Boydell", in: Irish Music in the Twentieth Century (= Irish Musical Studies 7), ed. Cox & Klein (Dublin: Four Courts Press, 1996), p. 263–70.
- Gareth Cox, Axel Klein, Michael Taylor (eds.): The Life and Music of Brian Boydell (Dublin: Irish Academic Press, 2003), ISBN 978-0-7165-2762-6.
- Richard Pine: Music and Broadcasting in Ireland (Dublin: Four Courts Press, 2005)
- Patrick Joseph Kehoe: The Evolution of the Radio Éireann Symphony Orchestra, 1926–1954, PhD thesis, Dublin: DIT, 2017, https://arrow.dit.ie/appadoc/87.
- Brian Boydell (ed. Barra Boydell): Rebellious Ferment: A Dublin Musical Memoir and Diary (Cork: Cork University Press, 2018), ISBN 9781782052869.
- Barbara Dignam, Barra Boydell (eds): Creative Impulses, Cultural Accents. Brian Boydell's Music, Advocacy, Painting and Legacy (Dublin: UCD Press, 2021), ISBN 978-1-910820-94-0.
