= John O'Conor =

Irish pianist (born 1947)

John O'Conor (born 18 January 1947) is an Irish pianist and pedagogue, and former director of the Royal Irish Academy of Music.

== Early career ==
Born in Dublin, O'Conor attended Belvedere College in that city. During his early Dublin studies, his main piano teacher was J. J. O'Reilly. Later he was awarded an Austrian Government scholarship that enabled him to study in Vienna with the pedagogue Dieter Weber. He also made a special study of Beethoven with the German pianist Wilhelm Kempff. In 1973 O'Conor was awarded First Prize at the International Beethoven Piano Competition in Vienna which launched his international career, and in 1975 he won First Prize at the Bösendorfer Competition.

== Performances ==
O'Conor has given recitals in many of the world's most notable halls including New York's Lincoln Center, the Kennedy Center in Washington, the Wigmore Hall and South Bank Centre in London, the Musikverein in Vienna, the Dvořák Hall in Prague and the Bunka Kaikan in Tokyo.

He has performed in Europe, North America, Asia, Africa, Australia and New Zealand, and has appeared with such orchestras as the London Symphony, Royal Philharmonic, Czech Philharmonic, Vienna Symphony, l'Orchestre National de France, the Scottish and Stuttgart Chamber Orchestras, the Israel Camerata, the NHK, Yomiuri, Kyushu, Kyoto and Sapporo Symphonies in Japan, the KBS Symphony in South Korea, the Singapore Symphony, the New Zealand Symphony and the orchestras of Cleveland, San Francisco, Atlanta, Boston, Dallas, Detroit, Indianapolis, Milwaukee, Seattle, Montreal, Toronto, Tampa and Washington, D.C., in North America. He has performed the complete sonatas of Beethoven in a cycle of eight recitals in one season on a number of occasions in many venues including Dublin (National Concert Hall), New York (Metropolitan Museum of Art) and Boston (Gardner Museum).

== Recordings ==
O'Conor has made more than 20 recordings for the Telarc label, including the complete Beethoven piano sonatas and the complete Beethoven Bagatelles, which later was cited by The New York Times as the best recording of these works; the five Beethoven piano concertos, released in 2008; four volumes of Mozart piano concertos with Sir Charles Mackerras and the Scottish Chamber Orchestra; numerous works of Schubert including the late A major sonata, the complete impromptus and Moments Musicals, waltzes and the Trout Quintet with the Cleveland Quartet; and two volumes of short piano pieces entitled Piano Classics and Autumn Songs. An avid proponent of his fellow countryman John Field, he has recorded most of the composer's major works including the complete concertos, sonatas and nocturnes. His recording of Field's Nocturnes was featured on Billboard Magazine's classical charts for many weeks. He has also recorded a popular CD of his favourite Irish airs (including "Danny Boy", "Come back to Erin" and "The Banks of my own lovely Lee") on the After9 label (called Irish Classics). In 2021, O'Conor released the complete Beethoven cello and piano sonatas with cellist Ailbhe McDonagh on the Steinway label.

== International piano competitions ==
O'Conor was a co-founder of the Dublin International Piano Competition, of which he is artistic director and chairman of the Jury. He has been invited to serve on the juries of many international piano competitions, including those in Leeds, Moscow (Tchaikovsky), Vienna (Beethoven), Warsaw (Chopin), Tel Aviv (Rubinstein), Beijing, Shanghai, Munich, Bolzano (Busoni), Cologne, Vevey (Clara Haskil), Cleveland (Cleveland International Piano Competition), Salt Lake City (Gina Bachauer), Sydney, Pretoria, London, College Park (William Kapell), Valencia (Jose Iturbi) and Seoul. He was involved in the organisation of the 2015 Dublin International Piano Competition.

== Teaching ==
O'Conor currently holds the position of professor of piano and 'distinguished visiting artist' at Shenandoah Conservatory (near Washington, D.C.), and retired as director of the Royal Irish Academy of Music in September 2010.

Since 1997, he has taken on the mantle of Kempff, and gives the annual Beethoven Interpretation Course in Kempff's own villa in Positano, Italy, where Kempff gave the course from 1957. A television programme made in 2007 (the 50th anniversary of the founding of the course by Kempff) was entitled Beethoven Bootcamp.

He gives masterclasses and lectures in many of the places he performs, as well as in many of the major music institutions, including the Juilliard and Manhattan Schools in New York, Harvard, Yale, Temple, Rutgers, Indiana and Seattle Universities, the Hamamatsu Piano Academy in Japan, the National University of the Arts in Korea, the Australian National Academy and the Sydney Conservatorium in Australia and the Royal Academy of Music and the Guildhall School of Music in London.

== Recognition ==
For his services to music, O'Conor has been awarded Honorary Doctorates by the National University of Ireland, Trinity College Dublin, Dublin Institute of Technology and Shenandoah University, an Honorary Fellowship by the Royal Irish Academy of Music, and honorary membership of the Society for Musicology in Ireland. He has been decorated with the title "Officier de l'Ordre des Arts et des Lettres" by the French Government, has been awarded the "Ehrenkreuz für Wissenschaft und Kunst" by the Austrian Government, and has also been decorated by the Italian and Polish governments. In 2011, he was awarded the "Order of the Rising Sun" by the Emperor of Japan.
