= Eric Sweeney (composer) =

Irish composer and jazz pianist

- Born: 15 July 1948; Dublin, Ireland
- Origin: Dublin
- Died: 21 July 2020 (aged 72) Waterford, Ireland
- Genres: Classical, Minimalism
- Occupations: composer, conductor, lecturer
- Years active: late 1960s–2010
- Spouse: Sally Johnston

Eric Sweeney (15 July 1948 – 21 July 2020) was an Irish composer. He was a member of Aosdána, an elite association of Irish artists.

== Early life ==
Eric Sweeney was born in Dublin in 1948. He studied in Ireland, England, Belgium and Italy, including at the Conservatorio Santa Cecilia.

== Career ==
Sweeney composed in a minimalist style influenced by Béla Bartók, Olivier Messiaen, Andrzej Panufnik, John Adams and Steve Reich. Over his career, he composed two symphonies, five concertos, three operas and choral works, including the cantata Deirdre. He was influenced by traditional Irish music and airs.

Sweeney lectured at the DIT Conservatory of Music (today the TU Dublin Conservatoire) and at Trinity College, Dublin. He was Choral Director at RTÉ from 1978 to 1981. He received a D.Phil. from the University of Ulster in 1994. He was Head of the Music Department at Waterford Institute of Technology until 2010. He was a member of the Arts Council from 1989 to 1993.

== Personal life ==
Sweeney married Sally Johnston in 1972; they had three children. They lived in Waterford from 1981 until his death in 2020.
