= James Wilson (composer) =

Irish composer of English birth

James Wilson (27 September 1922 – 6 August 2005) was an Irish composer. Though born in England, Wilson was a resident of Ireland for over 50 years.

== Early life ==
Wilson was born in Islington, London. His father, a chemist, died when James was only four days old, leaving his widowed mother to bring up three sons alone. Without any family background in music (the only real interest was his mother's slight interest in playing the piano), Wilson began piano lessons in 1931 (at the age of nine), continuing them until 1938. While in his early teens, Wilson attended many operas which fostered his interest in music.

After school, and without any formal higher education, Wilson entered the Civil Service after having passed their entrance exam. He served in the Royal Navy during the Second World War, from 1942 till 1946. Having finished his military service, Wilson began attending weekly musical composition classes at the Trinity College of Music in London. It was around this time that he left the Civil Service to pursue a full-time career in music. In 1948 he moved to Ireland, where he had been stationed in the latter part of his naval service.

== Musical work ==
Wilson was a largely self-taught composer. He experimented with many musical styles but did not particularly adhere to any of them. He had an interest in some less typical instruments, and wrote substantial works for the free-bass accordion, the cor anglais, and an electrically modified flute.

Wilson's creative output was large and varied: seven operas, three symphonies, twelve concertos, several ballets, about two hundred songs, and a large number of other choral and instrumental works. His works have been performed and broadcast throughout Ireland, the UK, and Scandinavia.

Wilson was professor of composition at the Royal Irish Academy of Music. For many years he was also the course director of the annual Ennis/IMRO Composition Summer School. Wilson was a founder-member of Aosdána, an association of people in Ireland who have achieved distinction in the arts.

In 1999 Wilson became an Irish citizen. He died just six years later in Dublin, on 6 August 2005. He was working on an eighth opera at the time of his death.

== Selected works ==
Opera

- Grinning at the Devil
- Letters to Theo
- The Hunting of the Snark (children's opera)
- Twelfth Night

Concerti

- For Sarajevo, Calico Pie (triple concerto)
- Concerto Giocoso

== Quotations ==
- Music is the nearest thing that we know to magic: its powers have still to be understood.
- In my own work, I seek for clarity and economy and, above all, for the quality of lyricism.
