= Royal Irish Academy of Music =

Music conservatoire in Dublin, founded 1848

Coordinates: 53.342333°N 6.250155°W

- Ceol Acadamh Ríoga na hÉireann
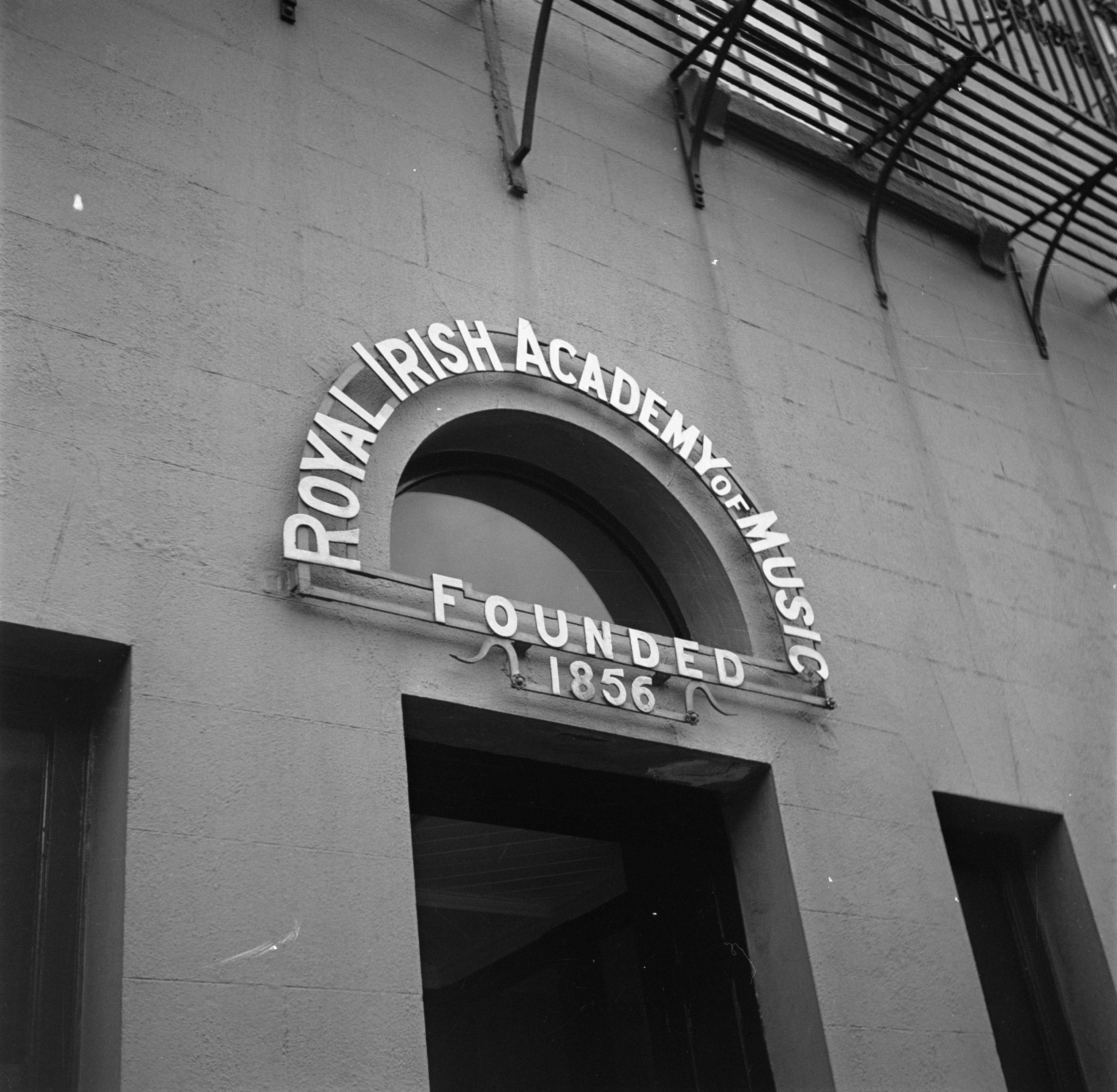
- Type: Private
- Established: 1848; 178 years ago
- Director: Deborah Kelleher
- Location: Dublin, Leinster, Ireland
- Website: www.riam.ie

The Royal Irish Academy of Music (RIAM) in Dublin, Ireland, is one of Europe's oldest music conservatoires, specialising in classical music and the Irish harp. It is located in a Georgian building on Westland Row in Dublin. An institution which offers tuition from age 4 up to doctorate level, the RIAM has taught music performers and composers who have gone on to acclaim on the world stage. It is an associate college of the University of Dublin, Trinity College Dublin.

== History ==
The RIAM was founded in 1848 by a group of music enthusiasts including John Stanford (father of Charles Villiers Stanford), Richard Michael Levey, and Joseph Robinson. It was originally located in the former Antient Concert Rooms on Pearse Street, then at 18 St Stephens Green, and moved to its present address in 36 Westland Row in 1871. The following year it was granted the right to use the title "Royal". Its teaching staff includes many international and national prizewinners, members of the National Symphony Orchestra of Ireland and the RTÉ Concert Orchestra and many individuals whose names have become synonymous with music education in Ireland.

The RIAM is a unique institution in the Irish context and doesn't follow the typical European conservatoire model. Since its foundation, it has developed to become a place of relevance and inspiration for musicians, reaching to over 50,000 each year. In the course of its history, the RIAM has led the music education of over 1,000,000 musicians in Ireland.

During the COVID-19 pandemic in Ireland, the RIAM cancelled its spring and summer examinations in line with the 12 March decision by the government to close schools and universities. In April, the RIAM announced that it was implementing an online system for exams. In response to social distancing measures, the RIAM also organised live stream performances and developed instructional content for its YouTube channel.

In September 2023, RIAM opened its new concert hall, the Whyte Hall, a 300 seater venue which purports to be "Dublin’s only purpose-built chamber music recital hall".

In March 2026, the Royal Irish Academy of Music became the first Irish conservatoire to enter the top 15 in the QS World University Rankings for music, ranking 12th in the world.

== RIAM Exams ==
RIAM Exams, previously called the Local Centre Examination System (LCES) founded in 1894, is Ireland's only indigenous examining body for music. RIAM Exams assess 42,000 students in 1,700 centres in every county across the island of Ireland. Over 7,000 private music teachers enter their students for these exams, and the RIAM has developed a portfolio of teacher training programmes aimed at this market. November 2013 saw the launch of the RIAM Teaching Network, Ireland's first virtual learning environment aimed at continuing education for the instrumental and vocal teacher. By utilising the skills of its core faculty to teach and advise the RIAM Teaching Network, the institution is committed to consolidating its position as "the champion and enabler of the private music teaching profession".

== Part-time tuition ==
The RIAM has 1,500 part-time students who are assessed annually and make up some of the pool of students who apply for RIAM's full-time courses. Recent initiatives such as junior chamber music and junior improvisation courses have sought to offer such students (and outside students) the opportunity to develop a more rounded musical education. In 2016, the RIAM launched the "Young Scholar Programme" to support the development of the especially committed school-age children, through international exchanges, masterclasses and mentoring.

== Full-time study ==
As an associate college of Trinity College, the University of Dublin, all RIAM degrees (at bachelor, master's and doctorate level) are awarded by Trinity College, and students have access to the facilities of this institution. 200 full-time students study at the RIAM and also act as cultural ambassadors for the RIAM and for Ireland, forging good professional careers and participating in international concerts and competitions. This student body is made of representatives from over 17 countries. These full-time programmes are focused on classical music performance, composition and education, and have been running for a quarter of a century. Graduates of the RIAM's full-time programmes have been accepted for further study at the most prestigious music institutions around the world from the Juilliard School in New York to the Royal Academy of Music in London. In recent years students of the Academy have been finalists and winners of some of the world's most prestigious international competitions including the Clara Haskil International Piano Competition, the Cardiff Singer of the World Competition, the China International Vocal Competition, the Cologne International Piano Competition, the Dublin International Piano Competition and the BBC Musician of the Year. On the international stage, former students are currently members of such leading orchestras as the London Symphony Orchestra, the Philharmonia Orchestra, Hong Kong Philharmonic Orchestra, as well as opera houses from the Royal Opera House at Covent Garden to La Scala, Milan.

The Cathal Gannon Early Music Room was opened in May 2003; it contains a harpsichord and clavichord made by Cathal Gannon, a Broadwood grand piano restored by him, a square piano and information about Mr Gannon in addition to other historically significant keyboard instruments. In 2016, the RIAM founded Ireland's first Historical Performance Department in collaboration with foundation partners, the Irish Baroque Orchestra.

== Philanthropy and financial aid ==
At least 10% of the RIAM's tuition income is reinvested in financial aid programmes for students. This allows young students from any socio-economic background to access a quality music education. At bachelor, master and doctorate level, tuition waivers are also made available, on the understanding that the scholarship recipients (known as "1848 Scholars") will give back to the institution by assisting faculty or joining its outreach projects in Dublin city and beyond.

== Special collections ==
The RIAM library holds a number of collections of historical interest, originally privately collected or belonging to orchestral and choral societies active in Dublin in the 18th and 19th centuries. Most notably, they include:

- The collections of the Sons of Handel and the Antient Concerts Society, who maintained a continuous choral tradition from 1790 to 1863 that was at the centre of musical life in Dublin.
- The collection of the Anacreontic Society (Ireland), an orchestral society active in Dublin from 1740 to 1865.
- The Hudleston Collection of solo and chamber music for guitar, collected by Josiah Andrew Hudleston (1799–1865) and which features around 1,100 works by Giuliani, Sor, Carulli and many others, in original and contemporary editions.
- The Joan Trimble Collection.

== Notable alumni ==
Notable former students and alumni of the Royal Irish Academy of Music include:

- Tara Blaise – pop and folk singer
- Seóirse Bodley – composer
- Moya Brennan – folk singer, songwriter and harpist
- Jessie Buckley – singer and actress
- John Buckley – composer
- Mairead Buicke – opera singer
- Anthony Byrne – pianist
- Celine Byrne – soprano
- Karan Casey – folk singer
- Finghin Collins – pianist
- Annie Jessy Curwen – writer and pianist
- Donnacha Dennehy – composer
- Denis Donoghue – literary critic
- Ellen Duncan – Irish art gallery director and critic.
- Tara Erraught – mezzo-soprano
- Frank Ll. Harrison – organist, composer and musicologist
- Ethel Hobday – pianist
- Frederick May – composer
- Ailbhe McDonagh – cellist and composer
- Frank McNamara – conductor, composer, and pianist
- Tara McNeill – singer, violinist, harpist
- Havelock Nelson – composer and conductor
- Betty Ann Norton – acting teacher
- Vincent O'Brien – organist, choir director and composer
- John O'Conor – pianist
- Eimear O'Grady – stuntwoman
- J.J. Sheridan – pianist and music historian
- Fionnuala Sweeney – journalist and broadcaster
- John Millington Synge – playwright and poet
- Joan Trimble – composer and pianist
- Ailish Tynan – soprano
- Gráinne Yeats – harpist and singer

== Notable teachers ==
Notable teachers at the Royal Irish Academy of Music (past and present) include:

- John S. Beckett – composer and conductor
- Walter Beckett – composer
- Brian Boydell – composer, broadcaster and writer
- Maeve Broderick – violinist
- Anthony Byrne – pianist
- Luigi Caracciolo – singer
- James Cavanagh – trumpet and conductor
- Lance Coburn – pianist
- Dearbhla Collins – pianist
- Dina Copeman – pianist
- William Dowdall – flautist
- Aisling Drury Byrne – cellist
- Veronica Dunne – opera singer
- Wilhelm Elsner – cellist
- Michele Esposito – composer and pianist
- Therese Fahy – Pianist
- Pamela Flanagan – pianist and cellist
- Anthony Glavin – poet
- Octave Grisard – violinist
- George Hewson – organist
- Anthony Hughes – pianist
- Fionnuala Hunt – violinist
- Brenda Hurley – repetiteur/vocal coach
- Thomas Richard Gonsalvez Jozé – organist, conductor, composer
- Doris Keogh – flute
- Virginia Kerr – opera singer
- John Francis Larchet – composer
- Madeleine Larchet née Moore – violinist
- Richard Michael Levey – violinist
- Annie Lord – pianist
- Rhona Marshall née Clark – pianist
- Christopher Marwood – cellist
- Ailbhe McDonagh – cellist and composer
- Dennis Noble – baritone
- John O'Conor – pianist
- Terry O'Connor – violinist
- Richard O'Donnell – percussionist
- Margaret O'Hea – pianist
- Guido Papini – violinist
- A. J. Potter – composer
- Joseph Robinson – composer and singer
- Marek Ruszczynski – repetiteur/vocal coach
- Elizabeth Scott-Fennell – singer
- Helmut Seeber – oboist
- Achille Simonetti – violinist and composer
- Robert Prescott Stewart – composer, organist, conductor
- Hugh Tinney – pianist
- Carmel Turner – pianist
- Clyde Twelvetrees – cellist
- Adelio Viani – singer
- Adolph Wilhelmj – violinist
- James Wilson – composer
- Sean Cahill – trombonist
