= Ronald Masin =

Dutch violinist, concertmaster and music educator (1937–2025)

- Born: Ronald Rudolf Masin; 9 August 1937; Rotterdam, Netherlands
- Died: 5 November 2025 (aged 88); Dublin, Ireland
- Occupations: Violinist, concertmaster, music educator
- Spouse: Maria Kelemen (m. 1962)
- Children: 2, including Gwendolyn Masin

Ronald Rudolf Masin (9 August 1937 – 5 November 2025) was a Dutch violinist, concertmaster, chamber musician, and music educator whose career spanned more than six decades across the Netherlands, South Africa, and Ireland. He served as concertmaster of the Amsterdam Philharmonic Orchestra (now the Netherlands Philharmonic Orchestra) from 1963 to 1984, co-founded the Amsterdam Kern Ensemble, and taught for fifteen years at the DIT Conservatory of Music and Drama in Dublin before becoming artistic director of the Young European Strings School of Music. He was also the founder of the Music Instrument Fund of Ireland (MIFI) in 1995, Ireland's only charity dedicated to providing professional-quality instruments to promising young string players.

== Early life and education ==
Masin was born on 9 August 1937 in Rotterdam, the Netherlands, to parents of Czech-Dutch descent. He began violin studies at the age of five at the Rotterdam Music Conservatory during the Second World War, continuing through the period of heavy bombardment of the city; unable to play with friends, he concentrated on the instrument, and the conservatory's director at the time described him as a wonder child. Following the war, his family relocated to Johannesburg, South Africa, where he lived from the age of nine to eighteen. He first performed as a soloist and chamber musician at the ages of twelve and thirteen, playing Max Bruch's First Violin Concerto in the city hall as part of centenary celebrations; among the several teachers he worked with in these years he singled out Joseph Spira as the most formative, and credited his chamber music teacher Betty Pack with a lasting influence on his musical life.

To pursue advanced professional training, Masin returned to Europe and enrolled at the Royal Music Conservatory in Brussels, where he studied under the Hungarian violinist and pedagogue André Gertler, a central figure in the Hungarian school of violin playing and a pupil of Jenő Hubay. Masin described Gertler as a great inspiration throughout his life. In 1962, he graduated with violin and chamber music diplomas with the highest distinction. During his studies in Brussels he met his future wife, the Hungarian violinist and violist Maria Kelemen, who was studying there on a Ford Scholarship; they married in 1962.

== Career ==
=== Netherlands Philharmonic Orchestra ===
In 1963, at the age of twenty-five, Masin became concertmaster of the Amsterdam Philharmonic Orchestra, known today as the Netherlands Philharmonic Orchestra, a position he held until 1984. During his tenure he worked alongside many of the most prominent musicians of the era, including Herbert Blomstedt, Bella Davidovich, Ida Haendel, Kirill Kondrashin, Yehudi Menuhin, David Oistrakh, Sviatoslav Richter, Gennady Rozhdestvensky, Yevgeny Svetlanov and Henryk Szeryng. His tenure coincided with that of his wife, Maria Kelemen, who co-led the viola section of the same orchestra until 1984.

As a soloist, Masin performed with numerous international orchestras and recorded pieces written for him by the composers John Buckley, Raymond Deane, Hans Kox, Eric Sweeney and Sándor Szokolay.

=== Amsterdam Kern Ensemble ===
In 1966, Masin and Kelemen co-founded the Amsterdam Kern Ensemble, a piano quartet comprising Masin (violin), Kelemen (viola), Bob Reuling (cello) and Rinus Groot (piano). The four-member format allowed the ensemble to play a wide range of duos, trios and quartets, from which it took its name: Kern means "core" or "nucleus". The ensemble performed over 600 concerts in 22 countries, held a recording contract with EMI, and commissioned and performed a large number of works by contemporary composers. Accounts of its lifespan differ, giving eleven or twelve years of activity; it ceased a full concert schedule at the end of the 1970s.

=== Violin Technique: The Natural Way ===
In 1982, Kelemen and Ronald Masin co-authored a violin tutor entitled Violin Technique: The Natural Way, published in English by Frits Knuf in Buren, the Netherlands. The book runs to 143 pages in twenty chapters and is dedicated to their teacher André Gertler. It is a comparative study of the various violin schools, focusing chiefly on the Hungarian School as taught by Gertler; the authors describe each of Kreutzer's 42 Studies in the manner in which they were taught by teachers of that school, explaining the purpose of each study and how it should be practiced. Forty photographic plates illustrate the text, and the avoidance of strain and unnecessary tension is a recurring concern. The authors intended it not only for beginners but as a means for mature players to refine their technique, carrying the method through to the point at which a player can teach others. The volume carries a preface by Henryk Szeryng, who described its analysis of the basic problems of instrumental command as comprehensive, and a recommendation by Zino Francescatti, who commended it for showing students how to practice without acquiring bad habits. The book appeared in both the Netherlands and America, and a copy of the treatise is held in the Henryk Szeryng Collection at the Library of Congress.

=== Academic career in South Africa ===
From 1984 until 1986, Masin was associate professor and head of the strings department at the University of Cape Town in South Africa. During the same period Kelemen established a music school in Cape Town based on the Kodály method. The school was open to children of all backgrounds during a period when apartheid remained in force. Because of the family's opposition to apartheid they left South Africa, moving first to Budapest, where Kelemen's maternal family lived. In 1987 Ronald Masin was offered the post of senior lecturer at the Dublin Institute of Technology, College of Music, and the family settled in Dublin. Because of the family's opposition to apartheid they left South Africa, moving first to Budapest and then settling in Dublin.

=== Dublin Institute of Technology ===
Following the family's relocation to Dublin, from September 1987 until his retirement in 2002, Masin was senior lecturer, and subsequently professor, at the Conservatory of Music and Drama at the Dublin Institute of Technology (DIT, now TU Dublin Conservatoire), and a regular guest teacher at international masterclasses in Ireland and abroad. There he instigated an exchange scheme allowing Irish students to perform at foreign conservatories, served on several committees, and conducted the DIT Senior Orchestra.

=== Young European Strings School of Music ===
Even before his retirement from DIT, Masin taught at the Young European Strings School of Music, founded by Kelemen in Dublin in 1988, from 1999, and in 2002 became its artistic director and the conductor of the Young European Strings Chamber Orchestra (YESCO). He introduced a regime in which the orchestra performed its entire repertoire from memory. Under his direction YESCO won first prize in the orchestras category of the Jugend und Musik in Wien competition in Vienna in 2009 and first prize Summa Cum Laude at the 63rd Europees Muziekfestival in Neerpelt, Belgium, in 2015, and received an Achievement Award from the Irish Association of Youth Orchestras in 2006. He conducted the orchestra's three albums, the last of which, Third Edition, was released in December 2011.

He remained in the post until his death in 2025. Aged 88, he still had a full class of thirteen students and coached and conducted both the chamber orchestra and the school's intermediate orchestra weekly, continuing to teach and perform — including Béla Bartók's Solo Sonata and the Brahms Violin Concerto — until the day he was hospitalised.

== Music Instrument Fund of Ireland ==
In May 1995, Masin founded the Music Instrument Fund of Ireland (MIFI), a registered charity established to make world-class string instruments available to promising Irish musicians. The fund's first patron was Yehudi Menuhin, who supported the initiative until his death in 1999. By 2025, the fund's thirtieth anniversary, MIFI's catalogue of sixteen instruments had benefited 91 young musicians, of whom 84 per cent went on to professional careers.

Masin resuscitated the Irish branch of the European String Teachers Association (ESTA) in 1989 and served as its first chairman. In 2001 he took part in an international forum on the future of music education in Ireland, organised by the Young European Strings School of Music at the National Concert Hall in Dublin, which brought together representatives of music-school associations from seven European Union countries and the chairman of the European Music School Union. The forum led to the establishment of the first official music school association in the Republic of Ireland and of the Music Education Action Group (MEAG), which produced a white paper on establishing state music schools and quality assurance that was formally presented to members of the Dáil Éireann.

== Legacy ==
Over the course of his career, Masin was credited with inspiring five generations of string players, many of whom went on to secure positions in leading orchestras worldwide or to pursue international solo and chamber music careers. By his own account he prepared forty-four students for distinctions in their Grade 8 examinations and his pupils won sixty-two first prizes at the Feis Ceoil national competitions. Notable students from his time at DIT and YES include the violinists Catherine Leonard, Gwendolyn Masin, Gina Maria McGuinness, Clíodhna Ryan, Dara Daly, David O'Doherty — a member of the Lausanne Chamber Orchestra and a lecturer at TU Dublin Conservatoire — and David Tobin, guest concertmaster with the RTÉ National Symphony Orchestra, Deutsche Oper Berlin and the Heidelberg Sinfoniker. His bowings and markings remained in circulation in Dutch orchestral libraries decades after he left the Netherlands.

== Personal life ==
Ronald Masin married violinist and violist Maria Kelemen in 1962. They had two children one of whom is Gwendolyn Masin, an internationally renowned concert violinist, author and educator. Ronald Masin died on 5 November 2025 in Dublin, following a short but intense illness. He is survived by his wife, his two children and their partners, and six grandchildren.

== See also ==
- Maria Kelemen
- Gwendolyn Masin
- Young European Strings School of Music
- André Gertler
- Hungarian school of violin playing
