= Maria Kelemen =

Hungarian-born violinist, violist and music educator (born 1938)

- Mária Kelemen
- Born: October 17, 1938 (age 87); Budapest, Hungary
- Education: Béla Bartók Conservatory; Royal Conservatory of Brussels; Royal Conservatory of Liège
- Occupations: Violinist, violist and music educator
- Known for: Founder and director of the Young European Strings School of Music (YES)
- Spouse: Ronald Masin (m. 1962; died 2025)
- Children: 2, including Gwendolyn Masin
- Parent: Klára Kelemen-Juhász (mother)
- Awards: Officer's Cross of the Order of Merit of Hungary (2005)

Maria Kelemen (also Mária Kelemen; born 17 October 1938) is a Hungarian-born violinist, viola player and music educator based in Dublin, Ireland. A representative of the Hungarian school of violin playing, she trained under André Gertler at the Royal Conservatory of Brussels before embarking on a two-decade career as principal violist of the Netherlands Philharmonic Orchestra and founding member of the Amsterdam Kern Ensemble. She is best known as the founder and director of the Young European Strings School of Music (YES) in Dublin, which she established in 1988.

In 2005, she received the Officer's Cross of the Order of Merit of Hungary.

== Early life ==
Kelemen was born in Budapest in 1938, the descendant of a long line of professional musicians. She began playing the piano at the age of six, took up the violin at seven, and later switched to the viola at twenty. Her maternal grandmother, the pianist Emilia Juhász-Schoffan (1875–1957), graduated from the Ferenc Liszt Academy at the end of the nineteenth century and in 1919 became founding director of a private music school on the Pest side of the city. The school taught keyboard, string and percussion instruments, with solfège training as an obligatory component for all instrumentalists.

Following the Second World War, direction passed to Emilia's daughter Klára Kelemen-Juhász (1904–1998), Kelemen's mother, herself a pianist with degrees from the Liszt Academy, who ran it until her death; it held the distinction of remaining the only privately owned and operated music school in Budapest throughout the communist period. Her pedagogical lineage runs through Gertler to Jenő Hubay, Joseph Joachim, Joseph Böhm, Pierre Rode and Giovanni Battista Viotti.

=== Education in Budapest ===
Kelemen studied at the Béla Bartók Conservatory in Budapest, where she was enrolled from 1952 to 1956. In 1956, in her final year at the institute, she left Hungary in the wake of the Uprising and became a stateless refugee in Belgium. According to her daughter, she fled Budapest with nothing but a violin on her back, the second occasion on which she had been a refugee.

=== Education in Belgium ===
With the aid of a Ford Scholarship, Kelemen went to Brussels, having been accepted as a student of André Gertler at the Royal Conservatory of Brussels. Gertler, one of the principal heirs to the Hungarian School tradition as a pupil of Jenő Hubay, became a formative influence on her approach to both performance and pedagogy. He developed what became known as the "Gertler Technique", based on the principle that the violinist should be physically relaxed while playing and should use as much of the natural weight of the limbs as possible rather than force. Kelemen received the Premier Prix for violin at the age of twenty and the Premier Prix for viola one year later, having taken up the latter instrument only twelve months previously. The school she later founded gives her diplomas as First Prizes in violin and viola from the Brussels and Liège Royal Music Conservatories in 1961.

It was in Gertler's class in Brussels that she met her future husband, the Dutch violinist Ronald Masin, who was also studying under Gertler; they married in 1962.

== Career ==
=== Netherlands Philharmonic Orchestra ===
Kelemen gained her first orchestral experience as a tutti player in the Antwerp Philharmonic Orchestra in Belgium before becoming, at the age of twenty-five, leader of the viola section of what was then the Kunstmaand Orchestra in Amsterdam, an ensemble subsequently renamed the Amsterdam Philharmonic Orchestra and today known as the Netherlands Philharmonic Orchestra. The school she later founded gives her age on taking up the position as twenty. She held the post until 1984. Her tenure coincided with that of her husband, Ronald Masin, who served as concertmaster of the same orchestra from 1963 to 1984. During these years the orchestra worked with soloists and conductors including Yehudi Menuhin, David Oistrakh, Henryk Szeryng, Sviatoslav Richter, Ida Haendel, Joshua Epstein, Herbert Blomstedt, Kirill Kondrashin and Gennady Rozhdestvensky.

=== Amsterdam Kern Ensemble ===
In 1966, Kelemen and Masin co-founded the Amsterdam Kern Ensemble, a piano quartet comprising Masin (violin), Kelemen (viola), Bob Reuling (cello) and Rinus Groot (piano). The four-member format allowed the ensemble to play a wide range of duos, trios and quartets, from which it took its name: Kern means "core" or "nucleus". Over twelve years the ensemble gave more than 600 concerts across 22 countries, touring throughout Europe, South Africa, Russia and Latin America. It held a recording contract with EMI and commissioned and performed a large number of works by contemporary composers. The ensemble ceased a full concert schedule at the end of the 1970s. Kelemen is listed as a member of both the Netherlands Philharmonic Orchestra and the Amsterdam Kern Ensemble in EMI-era discographies.

=== Violin Technique: The Natural Way ===
In 1982, Kelemen and Ronald Masin co-authored a violin tutor entitled Violin Technique: The Natural Way, published in English by Frits Knuf in Buren, the Netherlands. The book runs to 143 pages in twenty chapters and is dedicated to their teacher André Gertler. It is a comparative study of the various violin schools, focusing chiefly on the Hungarian School as taught by Gertler; the authors describe each of Kreutzer's 42 Studies in the manner in which they were taught by teachers of that school, explaining the purpose of each study and how it should be practiced. Forty photographic plates illustrate the text, and the avoidance of strain and unnecessary tension is a recurring concern. The authors intended it not only for beginners but as a means for mature players to refine their technique, carrying the method through to the point at which a player can teach others. The volume carries a preface by Henryk Szeryng, who described its analysis of the basic problems of instrumental command as comprehensive, and a recommendation by Zino Francescatti, who commended it for showing students how to practice without acquiring bad habits. The book appeared in both the Netherlands and America, and a copy of the treatise is held in the Henryk Szeryng Collection at the Library of Congress.

Kelemen wrote the book's introduction in the autumn of 1979, recording in it a remark by Gertler to pupils losing heart before a technical difficulty: that anyone could be taught to play the violin, even a street sweeper brought in off the street. The book has been cited in academic literature on the prevention of performance injury in string players: a 2014 doctoral monograph at Louisiana State University places it among the sources recommending the use of a shoulder rest, citing its position that one is needed where the player's neck is longer than the combined height of the instrument and chin rest, while suggesting that this recommendation reflected the limited range of chin-rest options and raising techniques available in Europe at the time. Kelemen has also written essays and articles on pre-kindergarten instrumental education for several Hungarian specialist magazines.

=== Teaching in South Africa ===
In 1984, the family relocated to Cape Town, South Africa, where Ronald Masin had accepted a position as associate professor and head of the strings department at the University of Cape Town, which he held until 1986. Having decided to devote herself to teaching, Kelemen established the Kodály Centre in Cape Town in 1984, named in homage to the Hungarian composer and educator Zoltán Kodály, whose methods had inspired her approach to teaching. The school was open to children of all backgrounds during a period when apartheid remained in force. Because of the family's opposition to apartheid they left South Africa, moving first to Budapest, where Kelemen's maternal family lived. In 1987 Ronald Masin was offered the post of senior lecturer at the Dublin Institute of Technology, College of Music, and the family settled in Dublin. Kelemen continued to teach privately in Cape Town and Dublin until 1988.

== Young European Strings School of Music ==
In 1988, following the family's relocation to Dublin, Kelemen founded the Young European Strings School of Music (YES), established in Templeogue, Dublin 6W, as a follow-up to the school she had begun in Cape Town. The school specializes in the early development and professional training of string players, accepting students from the age of two and a half years upwards for violin, viola, cello and double bass tuition. By 2010 Kelemen had assessed the musical potential of several thousand children. Instruction is divided into a Junior Programme, which Kelemen teaches and in which a parent attends each lesson, and a Senior Programme for more advanced students. In the same year the school was founded, Kelemen began organising international masterclasses and festivals in Ireland and abroad. Since 2012 the school has had as its patron Michael D. Higgins, President of Ireland; its chamber orchestra had performed at the launch of his presidential campaign and at his inauguration at Dublin Castle in November 2011.

Ronald Masin was a senior lecturer at the DIT Conservatory of Music and Drama in Dublin from 1987 until 2002, and taught at the school from 1999, joining it as artistic director in 2002 and conducting its chamber orchestra. He taught there until his death on 5 November 2025; aged 88, he still had a full class of thirteen students and coached and conducted both the chamber orchestra and the school's intermediate orchestra weekly. Both Kelemen and Masin also sat on the school's advisory board, which oversees its policy and financial decisions.

=== Methodology ===
The teaching at YES is based on the Kodály Approach, centered on the development of the child's "inner ear": the pupil is taught to hear a sound mentally before reproducing it vocally or on the instrument, so that each note can be judged by the ear on its own merit. The approach engages young children through singing games, hand-sign work, stick notation and improvisation, with the imaginative element devised by the teacher during the lesson itself. Kelemen has observed that words can be more of a hindrance than a help in describing spatial movement to a young child, and accordingly structures instruction around game-based activities. She has described the aim as teaching not only the instrument but the art of learning in general, and has said that her own research interest lies in developing methods of instrumental teaching that overcome the barrier of language. A parent attends each lesson in the Junior Programme, allowing the child's progress to be followed day by day at home.

In place of the imitation and repetition characteristic of the Suzuki method, Kelemen teaches beginners from Michaela's Music House, an illustrated tutor written by her daughter Gwendolyn Masin, on the grounds that it keeps the child's mind occupied. She places emphasis instead on the student's active critical evaluation of their own sound, continuing the emphasis on solfège that had been obligatory at the Budapest school founded by her grandmother. She has also described mastery of an instrument as giving a child a head start in life irrespective of whether a musical career follows.

Kelemen's work with more advanced students is documented in her daughter's doctoral study of contemporary violin pedagogy. She uses the Flesch scale system for stabilising the left hand and developing bow strokes, and continues to apply the "Geminiani grip" — the placement of the four left-hand fingers across the strings in first position, described in Francesco Geminiani's 1751 treatise — when working with young students, both in that order and in reverse. To reduce excessive pressure on the strings, she has students hold the violin in playing position but turn the left hand so that the fingers land on the strings as though on piano keys, a posture in which the hand presses no harder than necessary; where the pressure also stems from a stiff wrist, she uses vibrato exercises to loosen the joint. While teaching vibrato to young students she works through imagery rather than physical sensation alone.

=== Young European Strings Chamber Orchestra ===
The Young European Strings Chamber Orchestra (YESCO) is the school's senior ensemble, whose members receive weekly individual lessons, orchestral training and theory classes, and attend master classes with visiting international pedagogues. It performs its repertoire from memory, and the school regularly commissions Irish and international composers to write works for it. The orchestra won first prize in the orchestra category of the Feis Ceoil in 1999 and has consistently won prizes at the Dublin Feis Ceoil competitions since. It made its international debut with a concert tour of Finland in January 2001. Members have since toured in Finland, Spain, Hungary, Italy, Switzerland and Belgium, and the ensemble has performed at venues including the Brussels Conservatoire, the National Concert Hall in Dublin and the West Cork Chamber Music Festival.

YESCO received an Achievement Award from the Irish Association of Youth Orchestras in 2006, first prize in the orchestras category of the Jugend und Musik in Wien competition in Vienna in 2009, and first prize Summa Cum Laude in the string and symphony orchestra category at the 63rd Europees Muziekfestival in Neerpelt, Belgium, in 2015. The school itself received the PENNEYS/IAYO Award for Organisational Achievement in 2005 in recognition of its tour of Hungary, and a Special Award from the Irish Association of Youth Orchestras at the Festival of Youth Orchestras in February 2012 to mark the release of Third Edition.

The orchestra has released three albums: a first recording in 2003 featuring music by Tchaikovsky and Grieg; The Marino Suite (2006), a collaboration with John Sheahan of The Dubliners in arrangements by Raymond Deane; and Third Edition, released in December 2011, which included the world premiere of Deane's Five Piece Suite.

Kelemen conducts both the school's Junior Orchestra, for pupils aged four to six, and its Intermediate Orchestra, for pupils aged six to fourteen; the Intermediate Orchestra won first prize in the Open Orchestras category of the Feis Ceoil in 2015.

== Awards and recognition ==
Kelemen appeared on the cover of The Strad in September 1996, in a feature on her work with gifted young students. In 2005, during a state visit to Ireland by the President of Hungary, Dr Ferenc Mádl, she was awarded the Officer's Cross of the Order of Merit of Hungary in recognition of her long-standing work promoting Hungarian music and the Kodály methodology abroad. By that time she had taught hundreds of Irish and international students, many of whom went on to become professional musicians. In June 2009, she received the Businesswoman of the Year Award from the Irish-Hungarian Business Association at Trinity College Dublin.

== Personal life ==
Kelemen met the Dutch violinist Ronald Masin (1937–2025) while both were studying in André Gertler's class at the Royal Conservatory of Brussels; they married in 1962. The couple had two children, including concert violinist, author and pedagogue Gwendolyn Masin. Ronald Masin died in Dublin on 5 November 2025, aged 88, following a short but intense illness, having continued to teach and perform up until the day he was hospitalised. He was survived by Kelemen, their two children and six grandchildren.

== See also ==
- Young European Strings School of Music
- Ronald Masin
- Gwendolyn Masin
- Hungarian school of violin playing
- Kodály method
- André Gertler
