= Carcassi =

Carcassi is a surname. Notable people with the surname include:

- Lorenzo Carcassi (fl. 1700s), Florentine instrument maker
- Matteo Carcassi (1792–1853), Italian guitarist and composer
  - List of compositions by Matteo Carcassi
- Tomaso Carcassi (fl. 1700s), Florentine instrument maker
