= Music Instrument Fund of Ireland =

Irish charitable organization

- Abbreviation: MIFI
- Formation: 29 May 1995; 31 years ago
- Founder: Ronald Masin
- Type: Charitable organization, Company limited by guarantee
- Legal status: Active
- Headquarters: 11 Adelaide Road, Dublin
- Location: Ireland
- Region served: Republic of Ireland
- Chair: Evelyn Moriarty
- Website: www.mifi.ie

The Music Instrument Fund of Ireland (MIFI) is an Irish charity and company limited by guarantee that lends high-quality violins, violas and cellos to young string players. Founded in May 1995 on the initiative of the Dutch violinist and educator Ronald Masin, it aims to make suitable instruments available to young musicians who could not otherwise obtain them.

== History ==
MIFI was incorporated as a company limited by guarantee on 29 May 1995. According to Gwendolyn Masin, the founder's daughter, when her family moved to Dublin in the late 1980s Ireland was marked by poverty and emigration; many families struggled to pay for a classical music education, and valuable instruments were in the hands of professionals only. Promising young players often gave up their studies out of frustration when they reached a plateau, as their instruments limited their progress, and they could not tell whether a lack of improvement was due to themselves or to the quality of their instruments.

As the Celtic Tiger economy began to grow in the mid-1990s, Ronald Masin conceived the idea of a bank of instruments for students aspiring to professional careers, and invited like-minded people from various walks of life to help realise it. After establishing MIFI as a charity, he scouted instruments across Europe and sought supporters, philanthropists and government funding. Among the fund's founding directors was David Little, who supported the project from its beginning.

== Founder ==
Ronald Rudolf Masin (9 August 1937 – 5 November 2025) was a Dutch violinist of Czech-Dutch parentage. He studied at the Royal Music Conservatory in Brussels under André Gertler, receiving violin and chamber music diplomas with the highest distinction in 1962. He was concertmaster of the Amsterdam Philharmonic Orchestra from 1963 to 1984, and with the Amsterdam Kern Ensemble gave more than 600 concerts in 22 countries. From 1984 to 1986 he was associate professor and head of the strings department at the University of Cape Town, and from 1987 to 2002 senior lecturer, later professor, at the Conservatory of Music and Drama of the Dublin Institute of Technology. He later became artistic director of the Young European Strings School of Music, and remained a director of MIFI.

== Governance and patronage ==
MIFI's registered office is at 11 Adelaide Road, Dublin 2. The company has seven directors. The fund's website lists a board chaired by Evelyn Moriarty, whose members included the founder, Ronald Masin, and names Richard Redmond as a former director and chair. Gwendolyn Masin, the founder's daughter, has served on the fund's executive board since 2022.

Yehudi Menuhin was the fund's first patron, until his death in 1999. The fund's website quotes his description of the violin as helping "to keep our bearings in the storm, as a light in the night, a compass in the tempest". The website also presents Michael D. Higgins as the fund's patron, with a statement of support from him dated 1998.

== Instrument collection ==
By 2025 the fund's catalogue comprised sixteen instruments. The collection of violins, violas and cellos was sourced over thirty years on the advice of performers, teachers and dealers in Europe, and includes instruments by Italian, French and German makers. The fund describes the collection as intended to enable students to progress and compete internationally from a young age until maturity. Following an audition and interview, a panel of experts and advisors matches instruments to students.

Instruments in the MIFI collection named in sources
Instrument	Notes
Violin by Andrea Postacchini	Daimee Ng received a Postacchini violin from MIFI at the age of eleven and described its sound as bright, brilliant and bold; she went on to study at the Hochschule für Musik und Theater Hamburg. Neasa Ní Bhriain received a Postacchini violin at the age of sixteen and on it gained entrance to the HMT Rostock in 2008.
Violin by Luigi Cardi	David Tobin won a Cardi violin at audition at the age of fifteen and played it for three years.
Violin by Moeller	A recipient quoted on the fund's auditions page held the Moeller and a Cardi violin on loan for three years each.
Cello by Ferdinand August Homolka	A cello from the 1800s, lent to Patrick Moriarty at the age of fourteen.
3/4-size violin by Thibouville-Lamy	Donated by Paul Dowley for loan to young beginners with potential.

== Auditions ==
Auditions for violin, viola and cello are held every three years, usually in May, at the National Concert Hall in Dublin. Applicants must be aged between 12 and 25 and have attained Grade 8 of the ABRSM or its equivalent, submitting proof of their grades and, where applicable, of performances and masterclasses. Ahead of the 2025 round, the board lowered the minimum age from 14 to 12. Unsuccessful applicants may apply again, and a recipient may apply for a second three-year term by re-auditioning.

Selection takes place in stages. Applicants first submit a recording of two contrasting works, each of up to fifteen minutes; shortlisted candidates are invited to a live audition, performing three contrasting works of up to fifteen minutes each, with a pianist provided by the fund. Selected applicants then attend a private interview with a panel chosen by MIFI, which assesses their general suitability for an instrument loan. For the 2025 round, held on 17 May, applications opened on 6 January; the closing date, originally 20 March, was extended to 10 April.

The 2016 audition panel comprised Ronald Masin, Mia Cooper and Alan Smale; Smale served as an adjudicator on the fund's panels for many years. The jury for the 2025 auditions included violinists Ioana Petcu-Colan and Katherine Hunka, violists Lisa Dowdall and Cian Ó Dúill, and cellists Aisling Drury Byrne and Ailbhe McDonagh.

== Loan conditions ==
Each loan is made under a formal agreement between MIFI and the recipient, who may return the instrument within four weeks of signing if it does not meet their needs. The loan runs for three years, subject to the student's continuing progress and annual feedback from their teachers. MIFI insures the instruments and has them examined annually at its own expense; the recipient is responsible for the instrument's care and for the cost of any repairs found necessary, which only MIFI may commission. Recipients make an annual contribution towards the costs associated with the instrument, may not take it out of Ireland without the fund's written consent, and are expected to take part in some public performances at MIFI's request.

== Recipients ==
According to the fund, more than 100 young Irish musicians have been supported by MIFI instruments. Gwendolyn Masin wrote in 2025 that the sixteen instruments had benefited 91 young musicians, 84 per cent of whom had become professional musicians, and described MIFI as Ireland's only organization providing high-quality instruments to young people as part of its core mission. MIFI students played in the Young European Strings Chamber Orchestra when it won first prize Summa Cum Laude at the 63rd Europees Muziekfestival voor de Jeugd in Neerpelt in 2015, and in 2016 Eleanor Gaffney toured Spain with the National Youth Orchestra of Spain (JONDE) on a MIFI viola.

Selected MIFI recipients (1998–2014)
Recipient	Instrument	First award	Second award	Later career
Michelle Fleming	Violin	July 1998	—	Member of the Carducci Quartet
Ailbhe McDonagh	Cello	August 1998	—	Cellist and composer; string faculty, Royal Irish Academy of Music
Ruth Gibson		October 1999	—	
Brian O'Kane		September 2001	—	
David Tobin	Violin	September 2006	July 2010	Guest concertmaster with the National Symphony Orchestra of Ireland, Deutsche Oper Berlin and others
Patrick Rafter		September 2006	—	
Neasa Ní Bhriain	Violin	June 2007	—	Professor of viola, Hochschule für Musik Dresden; founding member of ensemble reflektor
Siobhan Doyle		July 2010	—	
Fiachra de hOra	Viola	October 2010	November 2013	Studied at the Conservatorium van Amsterdam and the Hochschule für Musik Basel
Patrick Moriarty	Cello	August 2011	—	Member of the Paddington Trio; faculty, Royal College of Music Junior Department
Abigail McDonagh		October 2012	—	
Eleanor Gaffney	Viola	August 2013	August 2014	Toured with the National Youth Orchestra of Spain (2016)

== State instrument support ==
Public support for musical instruments in Ireland is provided through the Music Capital Scheme, established in 2008, managed by Music Network and funded by the Department of Culture, Communications and Sport. Its Awards 2 and 3 are grants for established and emerging professional performers aged 18 and over in any musical style, covering up to 75 per cent of the cost of an instrument, with the applicant funding the remaining 25 per cent and providing for its insurance, care, maintenance and repair. Award 3 grants have supported musicians in genres including classical, folk, Irish traditional, jazz, pop, rock and electronic music.

In 2024 the scheme was extended with Award 4, the Music Network National Instrument Collection, following an investment of €1,090,700 by the then Department of Tourism, Culture, Arts, Gaeltacht, Sport and Media. Like MIFI, it lends high-quality string instruments to young classical musicians for three years. Announcing the scheme, Music Network's chief executive Sharon Rollston said that many of Ireland's most gifted classical musicians struggled to reach their potential because the cost put an appropriate instrument out of their reach.

MIFI and the state instrument loan scheme
Feature	Music Instrument Fund of Ireland	Music Network National Instrument Collection (Award 4)
Operator	Charity, company limited by guarantee (founded 1995)	Music Network, funded by the Department of Culture, Communications and Sport (established 2024)
Instruments	Violins, violas and cellos; sixteen instruments in 2025	Violins, violas and cellos; concert harp added in 2026; five instruments in 2024, seven in 2026
Eligibility	Aged 12 to 25, with ABRSM Grade 8 or equivalent	Aged 18 and over, in the final year of a degree or within three years of completing their studies; Irish citizens or residents
Loan period	Three years, subject to annual progress; a second term possible by re-auditioning	Three years, extendable by one year in exceptional circumstances
Additional support	—	Up to €5,000 towards a new bow, which the recipient keeps
Selection	Recorded preliminary round, live audition and interview	Written application with recordings and references, online interview and in-person audition
