= Gwendolyn Masin =

Dutch and Irish violinist (born 1977)

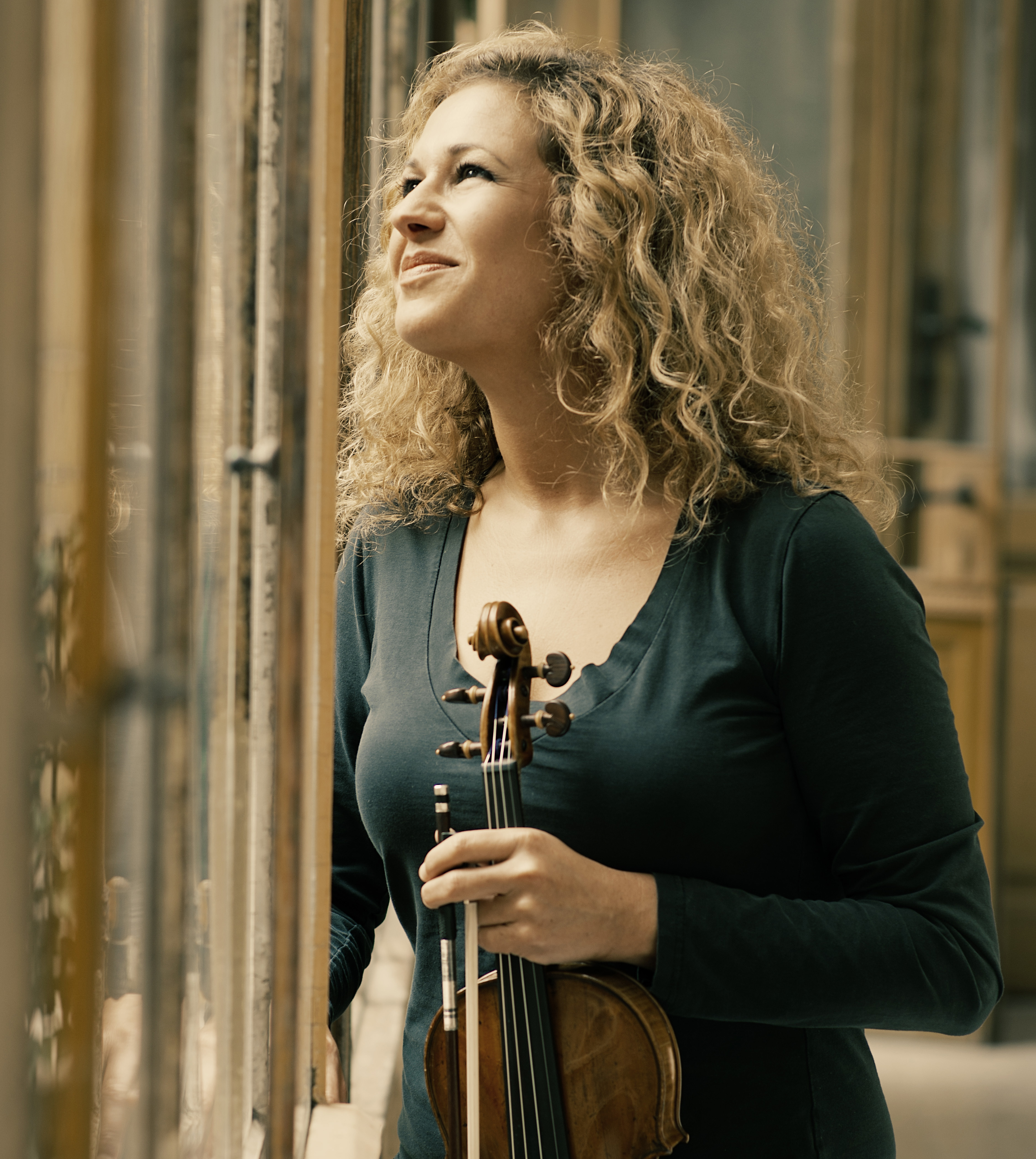

Background information
- Born: 17 November 1977 (age 48); Amsterdam, Netherlands
- Genre: Classical music
- Occupations: Violinist, author, pedagogue,
- Instrument: Violin
- Website: gwendolynmasin.com

Gwendolyn Masin (born 17 November 1977) is a Dutch and Irish violinist, musicologist, author, and educator.

== Early life ==
Masin was born in Amsterdam to Maria Kelemen and Ronald Masin. She began to play the piano at the age of 3, and took up the violin at the age of 5. Within her initial year of schooling, she gave her first public performance at the Franz Liszt Academy in Budapest. At the age of 11, she performed her first recital in Ireland at the National Concert Hall, Dublin. Shortly thereafter she appeared on the popular television program, The Late Late Show.

Masin began learning the violin in the class of Coosje Wijzenbeek. Following a move to South Africa, she continued her studies with her parents in Cape Town. Subsequently, she studied in Amsterdam with Herman Krebbers between 1990 and 1996. She has received degrees and diplomas from four countries and her graduate studies were guided by Igor Ozim, Ana Chumachenco, Zakhar Bron and Shmuel Ashkenasi.

== Career ==
=== Soloist ===
Masin has performed with the Hungarian National Philharmonic, the State Symphony Orchestras of Saint Petersburg and Belarus, the Bern Symphony Orchestra, the MÁV Symphony Orchestra, Musica Viva Chamber Orchestra, the Savaria Orchestra, the Orquesta de Cámara de Bellas Artes, and Portugal’s Concerto Moderno. In Ireland, she has performed and recorded with the RTÉ National Symphony Orchestra, RTÉ Concert Orchestra, the National Youth Orchestra of Ireland, and the Chamber Orchestra of the Young European Strings School of Music.

==== Chamber Music ====
Chamber music partners have included violinists Philippe Graffin, Jan Talich, Maxim Vengerov; violists Gérard Caussé, Isabel Charisius and Roger Chase; cellists Alexander Baillie, Adrian Brendel, Gavriel Lipkind, Martti Rousi, Alexander Rudin and Istan Vardai; pianists Kit Armstrong, Finghin Collins, Peter Frankl, György Sebök; conductors Janos Fürst and Gerhard Markson; wind instrumentalists Reto Bieri and Kaspar Zehnder; soprano Rachel Harnisch, and the actor Hanns Zischler. The pianist Simon Bucher has performed regularly with her since 1997.

==== Premieres ====
Masin has premiered works from Raymond Deane, Urs Peter Schneider, Eric Sweeney, Martijn Voorvelt and John Buckley. Buckley's Violin Concerto was premiered by Masin on 21 September 2013 in Savannah, Georgia's Lucas Theater with the Savannah Philharmonic conducted by Peter Shannon. It received its European premiere in the National Concert Hall in Dublin, Ireland, on 3 February 2015 with the RTÉ National Symphony Orchestra of Ireland conducted by Gavin Maloney. Don Li has composed solo pieces for her, some of which have been released by Tonus-Music Records.

==== Productions and Festivals ====
Masin established the international, multidisciplinary series In Search of Lost Time in 2004, continuing it in 2010 with a commissioned work inspired by Paul Klee's writings, composed by Thorsten Encke. Festival appearances include the West Cork Chamber Music Festival (Ireland), Prussia Cove (UK), and International Kamermuziekfestival Schiermonnikoog (Netherlands). In 2006, she founded the annual GAIA Music Festival. In 2007 she was appointed Carrick Water Music Festival's artistic director, a post she held for 3 years.

Between 2019 and 2023, Masin curated a series called Cocktail für die Musen for Casino Bern, Switzerland.

==== Pedagogy and Authorship ====
In 2020, Masin created The Exhale, a retreat for musicians, but the COVID-19 pandemic forced her to move the project online.

Masin practices yoga, which she used as the basis for a series of articles for The Strad in 2018, 2020 and 2021.

Masin has given violin and chamber music masterclasses throughout Europe, North America, and East Asia. She holds a Ph.D. from Trinity College in which she examines violin pedagogy in the 20th-century, exploring the similarities and differences between schools of playing. Her book on violin teaching Michaela’s Music House, The Magic of the Violin, was published in 2009 by Müller & Schade in English, and German in 2018. Masin held a teaching position for violin studies at Haute école de musique de Genève in Geneva, Switzerland from September 2013 until 2021.

== Awards and recognitions ==
Masin has won national and international prizes and awards in Ireland, South Africa, Switzerland, the UK and the Netherlands. As the Dutch representative at the Global Stipends Awards, she received the International Music Award.

== Instrument ==
Masin plays a Lorenzo Carcassi violin from 1761.

== Discography ==
- 15 Squared (with Don Li)
- GAIA Music Festival 2009 (2009)
- GAIA Music Festival 2013 (2013)
- Eugène Ysaÿe: "Ballade" from the Violin Sonata No. 3 in D Minor (2016)
- Origin (2016)
- ZuekunftsNostalgie (with Oli Kehrli) (2016)
- GAIA Music Festival 2016 (2016)
- GAIA Music Festival 2017 (2017)
- Flame (2017)
- Trois (2018)
- GAIA Music Festival 2018 (2018)
- GAIA Music Festival 2019 (2019)
- West Side Story (2020)
- Legends (2022)

== Bibliography ==
- Michaelas Musikhaus, Der Zauber der Geige 1, Lektionen 1–7 (Müller & Schade, 2018) ISBN 978-3-905760-12-5, ISMN M-50023-553-8;
- Michaelas Musikhaus, Der Zauber der Geige 1, Lektionen 8–16 (Müller & Schade, 2018) ISBN 978-3-905760-13-2, ISMN M-50023-578-1;
- Michaelas Musikhaus, Der Zauber der Geige 1, Lektionen 17–24 (Müller & Schade, 2018) ISBN 978-3-905760-14-9, ISMN M-50023-579-8;
- Michaelas Musikhaus, Der Zauber der Geige – Begleitheft mit 16-seitiger Klavierbeilage (Müller & Schade, 2018) ISMN M-50023-811-9;
- Michaela's Music House, The Magic of the violin (Müller & Schade, 2009) ISBN 978-3-905760-04-0, ISMN M-50023-448-7;
- Violin Teaching in the New Millennium: In Search of the Lost Instructions of Great Masters – an Examination of Similarities and Differences Between Schools of Playing and How These Have Evolved, or Remembering the Future of Violin Performance (Trinity College Dublin, 2012)
