= GAIA Music Festival =

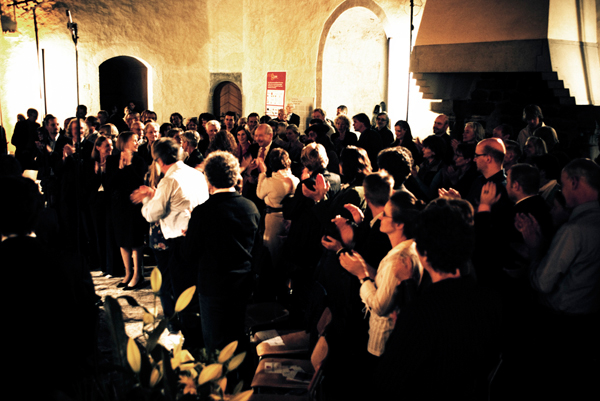
- Audience at the GAIA Music Festival, Oberhofen
- Genre: Chamber music, classical music
- Dates: Annually, late autumn
- Locations: Oberhofen, Hilterfingen, Thun, Bern (Switzerland); previously Stuttgart (Germany) and Geneva
- Years active: 2006–present
- Founders: Gwendolyn Masin
- Patron: David Zinman (2010–2014)
- Website: www.gaia-festival.com

The GAIA Music Festival is an annual non-profit chamber music festival held in Oberhofen, Hilterfingen, Thun and Bern, Switzerland. It was founded in 2006 by Dutch-Irish violinist Gwendolyn Masin, who serves as its artistic director. The festival takes its name from Gaia, the Greek personification of the Earth, which the organisation interprets as a metaphor for music as a living ecosystem shaped by the interaction of artists, audiences and their physical surroundings.

Originally established near Stuttgart, Germany, the festival made its Swiss debut in 2009 and was officially renamed the GAIA Music Festival in 2014. It has since become one of the prominent chamber music events in Switzerland, known for its residency-based format, open public rehearsals, an annually changing thematic framework, and the pairing of mainstream chamber repertoire with rarely performed or newly commissioned works. From 2010 until 2014, the patron of the festival was conductor David Zinman, then Chief Conductor of the Tonhalle-Orchester Zürich.

The festival stages performances in historic venues such as Oberhofen Castle on Lake Thun, the Town Church of Thun, and — since its expansion into Bern — museums and cultural institutions in the Swiss capital. Live recordings from every edition are released digitally through Orchid Classics and Naxos.

== History ==
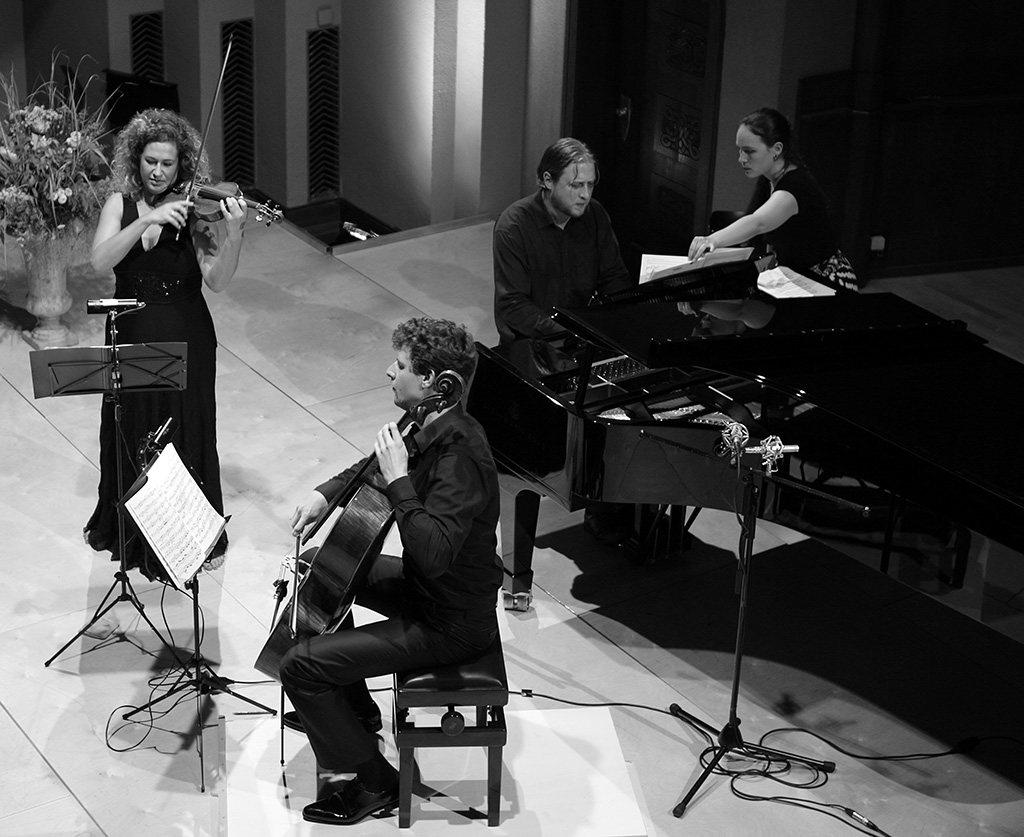
Gwendolyn Masin, István Várdai and Bálint Zsoldos during a concert at the 2014 edition of GAIA

=== Origins near Stuttgart (2006–2008) ===
The festival was first hosted near Stuttgart, Germany, in 2006 under a different name, before Masin and the Bernese architect Christopher Ott began developing a Swiss edition. In its early years the festival received the Göppinger Kulturpreis, a prize awarded for outstanding and innovative voluntary cultural work in the Göppingen district.

=== Swiss debut and establishment (2009–2014) ===
In 2009, the festival made its Swiss debut in the Lake of Thun region. The Bernese Oberland setting — with its lakeside landscapes and medieval architecture — was chosen as a physical expression of the festival's philosophy of site-specific performance. From 2010 to 2014, conductor David Zinman, at the time Chief Conductor of the Tonhalle-Orchester Zürich, served as the festival's patron, a period during which GAIA consolidated its position within the Swiss chamber music calendar. The festival was officially renamed the GAIA Music Festival in 2014.

=== Geneva editions (2015 and 2017) ===
In 2015 and 2017, GAIA also took place in Geneva, in collaboration with the Haute École de Musique. These editions allowed the festival to engage with the academic and international musical life of the city and to extend its collaborative model beyond the German-speaking region of Switzerland.

=== Anniversary editions ===
Two anniversary editions have played a defining role in the festival's development. The fifth anniversary of GAIA in Thun was marked in 2013 with a programme of new works and transcriptions. The tenth edition in 2018 featured three world premieres, by Thomas Fortmann and Raymond Deane, alongside the festival's regular programme.

=== Expansion to Bern ===
In subsequent years, the festival gradually expanded its footprint into the city of Bern. The 2025 edition, themed "Residencies", was staged across seven venues in Bern, Thun, Hilterfingen and Oberhofen. A distinctive feature of the Bern programme was an opening-night musical journey through the city's Museum Quarter, during which audiences were led between the Museum of Communication, the Natural History Museum and the Media Library of PHBern, each of which hosted a surprise concert of about thirty minutes. The pairing of the tranquil Bernese Oberland with the denser cultural environment of the capital has since become a structural feature of the festival's programming.

== Concept and artistic vision ==
=== The Gaia premise ===
The festival's name refers to Gaia, the primordial Greek earth deity, used by the organisation as a metaphor for a living cultural ecosystem in which artists, audiences and landscape interact. Each performance is conceived as singular to its time and place, with the Swiss landscape serving as what the organisation calls a platform for the "discourse between artist and muse".

=== Annual themes ===
Each edition is built around an annually changing theme intended to connect genres and examine contemporary society and culture through the lens of chamber music. Recent themes include:

Year	Theme
2024	Mensch – an exploration of kindness, humility and personal responsibility
2025	Residencies – the relationship between artists, place and temporary community

=== Interdisciplinary approach ===
A recurring feature of the festival's programming is the integration of other art forms alongside music. Literary texts, visual art and site-specific presentation have all been incorporated into individual editions: in 2016, for example, new texts by the Swiss writer Lukas Hartmann were set alongside works by Telemann, Stravinsky and Mussorgsky. The organisation has described its mission as placing the traditions of classical music in direct conversation with their 21st-century expression.

== Artistic direction ==
The festival has been led since its founding by its artistic director Gwendolyn Masin, a Dutch-Irish violinist, musicologist and curator. Her curatorial approach treats the festival as a space for "critical observation" of contemporary society, selecting repertoire and artists to reflect a given year's theme. In its development, Masin has also collaborated closely with the Bernese architect Christopher Ott, who has served on the festival's Advisory Board.

== Format ==
=== Residency model ===
Each year, artists from across the world spend just over a week living, working and rehearsing together in Oberhofen. Rather than flying in for individual concerts, participants form a temporary artistic community, which the festival presents as a deliberate contrast to conventional soloist-driven formats.

=== Open rehearsals ===
Rehearsals are open to the public free of charge, a policy intended to demystify the creative process and strengthen local engagement. Visitors may observe rehearsals in Oberhofen without advance booking.

=== Concert programming ===
The festival is characterised by its informal, collaborative atmosphere and its programming of rarely performed works alongside the mainstream chamber repertoire. Each edition typically includes at least one contemporary commission or newly arranged work, ensuring an ongoing relationship between the festival and living composers.

== Venues ==
Concerts are held across multiple venues, including Oberhofen Castle, the Klösterli, the Parkhotel Gunten, and churches in Thun and Hilterfingen.

=== Oberhofen Castle ===
Oberhofen Castle (German: Schloss Oberhofen), located directly on the shores of Lake Thun, is the festival's primary venue. Its medieval keep dates to around 1200, and the site has passed through eight centuries of ownership including the Habsburgs, the von Erlach family, and, in the 19th century, the Prussian count Albert von Pourtalès, who converted it into a historicist summer residence. The castle's historical rooms, including the Oriental Smoking Room in the upper keep, a chapel with 15th-century frescoes, the dining room and the billiard room, are used as intimate concert spaces that evoke the domestic musical traditions of the European aristocracy.

=== Churches of the Lake Thun region ===
The festival uses several ecclesiastical buildings that offer contrasting acoustic profiles suitable for larger ensemble and vocal works. These include the Stadtkirche Thun (Town Church of Thun), the Scherzligen Church, and the parish church in Hilterfingen.

=== Other venues in the Bernese Oberland ===
Further venues in the region include the Klösterli in Oberhofen and the Parkhotel Gunten, which contribute to the festival's characteristic blend of "nature and village" settings.

=== Bern venues ===
Since the festival's expansion into Bern, venues in the capital have included institutions in the city's Museum Quarter: the Museum of Communication, the Natural History Museum, and the Media Library of PHBern (the University of Teacher Education).

== Featured artists ==
Over the years the festival has brought together a wide range of international performers across all instruments of the chamber music repertoire.

Instrument	Artists
Violin	Gabriel Adorján, Anke Dill, Ilya Hoffmann, Esther Hoppe, Yura Lee, Gwendolyn Masin, Ronald Masin, Lena Neudauer, Sergey Ostrovsky, Rosanne Philippens, Rahel Rilling, Svetlin Roussev, Tatiana Samouil, Lisa Schatzman, Alexander Sitkovetsky, Jan Talich, Kirill Troussov, Isabelle van Keulen
Viola	Tomoko Akasaka, Alessandro D'Amico, Guy Ben-Ziony, Gérard Caussé, Isabel Charisius, Blythe Teh Engstroem, Jan Gruening, Lilli Maijala, Lars Anders Tomter, Dana Zemtsov
Cello	Dávid Adorján, Claudio Bohórquez, Alexander Chaushian, Natalie Clein, Christoph Croisé, Thomas Demenga, Chiara Enderle, Andreas Fleck, Pavel Gomziakov, Frans Helmerson, Louise Hopkins, Guy Johnston, Aleksei Kiseliov, Dóra Kokas, Gavriel Lipkind, Rafael Rosenfeld, Timora Rosler, Martti Rousi, Jakob Spahn, Torleif Thedéen, István Várdai, Quirine Viersen
Piano	Julia Bartha, Alasdair Beatson, Simon Bucher, Finghin Collins, Peter Frankl, José Gallardo, Diana Ketler, Robert Kulek, Alexander Lonquich, Aleksandar Madzar, Vincenzo Maltempo, Hannes Minnaar, Cédric Pescia, Pascal Rogé, Jan Philip Schulze, Marianna Shirinyan, Dobrinka Tabakova, Roman Zaslavsky, Bálint Zsoldos
Clarinet	Reto Bieri, Don Li, Christoffer Sundqvist, Yevgeny Yehudin
Flute	Janne Thomsen, Kaspar Zehnder, Jacques Zoon
Bassoon	Martin Kuuskmann, Rui Lopes
French horn	Hervé Joulain
Saxophone	Daniel Schnyder
Cimbalom	Miklós Lukács
Harpsichord	Vital Julian Frey, Sebastian Wienand
Double bass	James Oesi, Lars Schaper
Harp	Sarah Christ, Jana Boušková
Soprano	Rachel Harnisch
Mezzo-soprano	Jordanka Milkova, Stephanie Szanto
Percussion	Matthias Eser, Pavel Bialiayeu, Andrei Pushkarev
Other instruments	Xala: Ania Losinger
Ensembles	Ariel Quartet, Aviv Quartet, Grazioso Chamber Orchestra of the Hungarian National Philharmonic, Merel Quartet, Melisma Saxophone Quartet, ORIGIN Ensemble, Young European Strings Chamber Orchestra, Yurodny

== Premieres and commissions ==
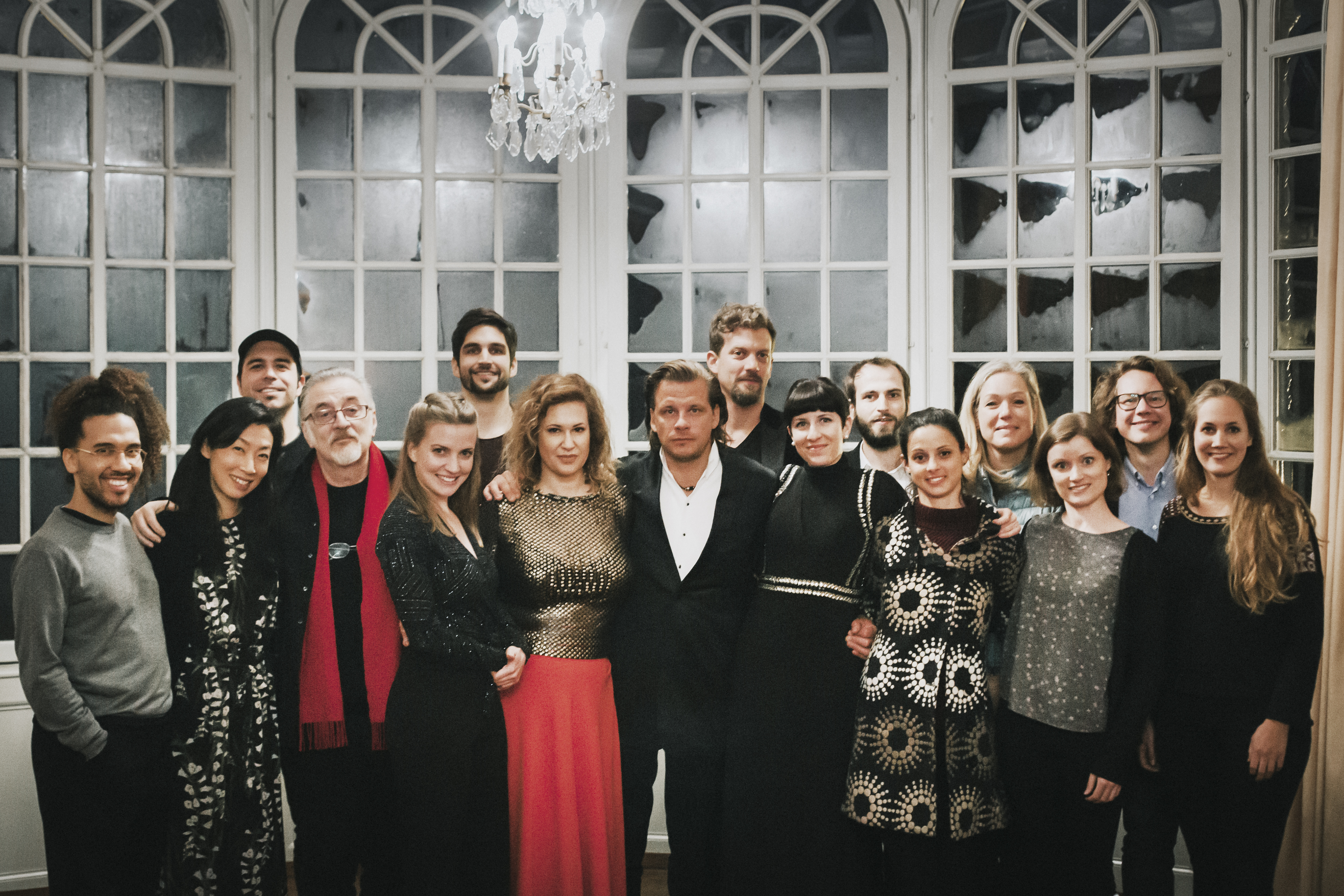
The musicians of the 11th edition of the GAIA Music Festival, Oberhofen

Since its Swiss debut, the GAIA Music Festival has consistently served as a platform for world and Swiss premieres, often commissioning or dedicating new works for its own ensembles.

=== 2009–2012 ===
In 2009, works by Don Li were performed by the composer with Ania Losinger, Matthias Eser and the Tonus String Quartet, and a new arrangement of Johan Halvorsen's Passacaglia, written especially for the festival, received its world premiere. The following year saw the world premiere of Jorge Bosso's Moshee for cello and strings, alongside Swiss premieres of works by Max Bruch, Johann Sebastian Bach, Pyotr Tchaikovsky, Johan Halvorsen and Robert Schumann — including the first Swiss performance of Schumann's first piano quartet. In 2011, compositions or transcriptions of works by Kurt Atterberg, Alban Berg, Ernest Bloch and Cesar Viana were given their premieres, followed in 2012 by new transcriptions of works by Johann Sebastian Bach.

=== 2013–2014 ===
The fifth anniversary of GAIA in Thun in 2013 was celebrated with new works and transcriptions by Luigi Boccherini, Arcangelo Corelli, Astor Piazzolla, Andrei Pushkarev, Franz Schubert and the group Yurodny. In 2014, a Bagatelle by Benjamin Britten for violin, viola and piano and works by Paul Juon received their Swiss premieres.

=== 2015–2017 ===
Daniel Schnyder served as Composer-in-Residence in 2015; among the works of his performed during that edition, his Mensch Blue had its world debut and Ad Parnassum its first Swiss performance. The 2016 festival was notable for incorporating premieres of literary works alongside music: Lukas Hartmann contributed new texts set to Telemann's Burlesque de Quixotte, Stravinsky's Suite italienne, and Mussorgsky's Pictures at an Exhibition, the last of which also received its Swiss premiere in a version for string quintet and piano. Further international premieres that year included works by Camille Saint-Saëns and Manuel de Falla in arrangements by Raymond Deane for Gwendolyn Masin's ORIGIN Ensemble.

The 2017 programme brought several world premieres: Massimo Pinca's The Fates for string quartet and cimbalom, OLUM by Marco Antonio Pérez-Ramírez, Bartók-Impressions (after the Romanian Folk Dances Sz. 68 by Béla Bartók) by Miklós Lukács, and Maximilian Grossenbacher's Airreel. The Swiss premiere of Rebecca Clarke's Grotesque also took place that year.

=== 2018–2019 ===
The tenth edition of the festival in 2018 featured three world premieres: Thomas Fortmann's Andante für einen Oberhofer Purzelbaum and Bourlesque, and Raymond Deane's Hungarian-Jewish Melodies. For the eleventh edition in 2019, Thomas Fortmann dedicated his Dreisamkeit for mezzo-soprano, clarinet and double bass to the festival, where it also received its world premiere. That same year, Dobrinka Tabakova performed her Whispered Lullaby together with Gwendolyn Masin in the work's Swiss premiere.

=== Selected premieres ===
Year	Type	Work	Composer
2009	World premiere	Passacaglia (new arrangement)	Johan Halvorsen
2010	World premiere	Moshee for cello and strings	Jorge Bosso
2010	Swiss premiere	Piano Quartet No. 1	Robert Schumann
2015	World premiere	Mensch Blue	Daniel Schnyder
2015	Swiss premiere	Ad Parnassum	Daniel Schnyder
2016	World/Swiss premieres	Literary settings of works by Telemann, Stravinsky and Mussorgsky	Texts by Lukas Hartmann
2017	World premiere	The Fates for string quartet and cimbalom	Massimo Pinca
2017	World premiere	Bartók-Impressions (after Romanian Folk Dances Sz. 68)	Miklós Lukács
2017	Swiss premiere	Grotesque	Rebecca Clarke
2018	World premiere	Hungarian-Jewish Melodies	Raymond Deane
2018	World premiere	Andante für einen Oberhofer Purzelbaum; Bourlesque	Thomas Fortmann
2019	World premiere	Dreisamkeit (dedicated to the festival)	Thomas Fortmann
2019	Swiss premiere	Whispered Lullaby	Dobrinka Tabakova

== Masterclasses and education ==
=== GAIA Masters (2010–2011) ===
In 2010 and 2011 the festival held masterclasses under the name GAIA Masters. Faculty included Shmuel Ashkenasi, Igor Ozim, Wonji Kim, Philippe Graffin, Vladimir Mendelssohn, Gérard Caussé, Frans Helmerson and Philippe Muller.

=== Extended pedagogical work ===
The festival's educational ethos has subsequently informed Masin's broader pedagogical activity, including her direction of the International Master Course at the National Concert Hall in Dublin, and a series of workshops and somatic-education programmes delivered under the name "The Exhale". The Exhale addresses the physical, mental and social well-being of musicians, drawing on Body Mapping and related practices, and includes community classes, courses for children and masterclasses on the works of Bach and Mozart.

== Recordings ==
Live recordings are produced at every edition of the festival. Works are personally selected by Masin and released digitally in cooperation with Orchid Classics and Naxos, available on major streaming platforms.

Year	Programme
2009	Music of Brahms, Dvořák & Prokofiev
2010	Music of Atterberg, Bruch, Schumann & Weiner
2011	Music of Berg, Bloch, Debussy, Ligeti & Webern
2012	Music of Krenek & Webern
2013	Music of Hiller & Piazzolla
2014	Music of Bridge & Britten
2015	Music of De Falla, Medtner & Schnyder
2016	Music of Beethoven, Mussorgsky, Popper & Stravinsky
2017	Music of Liszt, Beethoven & Ravel
2018	Music of Deane, De Falla, Fortmann & Mozart
2019	Music of Bartók, Brahms, von Herzogenberg & Schumann

In addition to the annual live-recording series, the festival's artistic circle has been associated with the album Legends, released with Orchid Classics in cooperation with SRF 2 Kultur, which features works by composers including Irène Wieniawska (Poldowski).

== Organisation and funding ==
=== Association structure ===
The festival is operated by the GAIA Music Festival Association, a Swiss non-profit organisation based in the canton of Bern. It is governed by an Executive Board, supported by a Voluntary Organising Committee and an Advisory Board.

=== Executive Board ===
The Executive Board has been chaired by the historian and politician Regula Rytz as President, with Gwendolyn Masin serving as Artistic Director. Other members have included the communications specialist Caterina Ciani, the lawyer Franz Schärer and the software entrepreneur Marcel Zemp.

=== Advisory Board ===
The Advisory Board has included the Swiss writer Lukas Bärfuss and the architect Christopher Ott, reflecting the festival's deliberate integration of literary and architectural perspectives into its artistic programming.

=== Patronage ===
As a non-profit organisation, GAIA is supported through public funding, ticket revenue and private patronage. Patronage structures include "Gwendolyn's Bridge Club" and the "Circle of Friends GAIA", which contribute to the production of concerts, recordings and commissions.

== Reception and legacy ==
Coverage of the festival in Swiss press, including the Berner Zeitung and SRF, has highlighted its intimate atmosphere, its cross-disciplinary programming and its role as a platform for new works. The festival is listed by the European Festivals Association among Switzerland's notable classical events.

Through its sustained relationship with Orchid Classics and Naxos, and through collaborative projects such as the album Legends (produced in cooperation with SRF 2 Kultur and featuring works by composers including Irène Wieniawska), the world and Swiss premieres hosted at GAIA have reached audiences beyond the Lake Thun region.

== See also ==
- List of classical music festivals
- Chamber music
- Oberhofen Castle
- Gwendolyn Masin
