= Hibernian Orchestra =

The Hibernian Orchestra (formerly the Hibernian Chamber Orchestra) is an orchestra based in Dublin, Ireland.

Founded in 1981, the orchestra performs extensively in Dublin and increasingly is bringing music to regional towns across Ireland. Its repertoire ranges from early works to newly commissioned pieces. Notable artists who have performed with the orchestra include Finghin Collins, Philip Martin, and Ioana Petcu-Colan.
