= Young European Strings School of Music =

Coordinates: 53.30051°N 6.31379°W

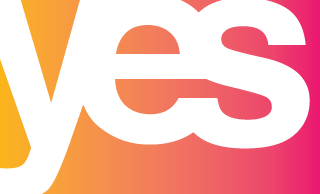
- Dublin; Ireland

Information
- Motto: Music is a Language
- Established: 1988
- Founder: Maria Kelemen
- Website: http://www.youngeuropeanstrings.com/

The Young European Strings (YES) School of Music is located in Dublin, Ireland and specialises in the early development and training of young professional musicians. The YES School of Music provides tuition for the violin, viola, cello and double bass. The Young European Strings Chamber Orchestra (YESCO) has performed throughout Europe and has released three albums to date.

== History ==
Young European Strings was established in 1988 by Hungarian-born viola player Maria Kelemen. Kelemen’s grandmother, pianist Emilia Schoffan, founded the first private music school in Budapest in the early twentieth century. Kelemen left Hungary in 1956 to study at the Brussels and Liège Royal Music Conservatories and began her professional career at the age of twenty as the co-leader of the viola section in the Netherlands Philharmonic Orchestra, where she remained until 1984. Kelemen moved to Ireland in 1988 and founded Young European Strings a year later for young children learning music from the age of two and a half years, integrating her own methods with the Kodály Approach. Young European Strings has been patronised by the person who holds the seat of President since Mary Robinson began her service in December 1990.

YESCO made their international debut with a concert tour of Finland in January 2001. In 2006, YESCO won the Achievement Award from the Irish Association of Youth Orchestras (IAYO) and, in 2009, won first prize in the 'Orchestras' category in the international festival Jugend & Musik in Wien. In 2014, YESCO performed at the National Concert Hall in Dublin and subsequently performed at the venue twice a year thereafter until 2023.

== Teachings ==
The YES School of Music employs a teaching method called the Kodály method, an approach through singing and game-playing. Maria Kelemen emphasises ‘a personal and even physical experience of music’ in her teaching methods, integrating the parts of Kodály’s philosophy that she believes in, specifically, ‘his priority of making children hear the notes they are singing or playing in their heads.’

Students of the YES School of Music are annually presented in graded practical (instrumental) and theory examinations before ABRSM (Associated Board of Royal Schools of Music).

== Orchestras ==
The orchestras of the YES School of Music comprise the Junior Orchestra (4 to 6 year olds), the Intermediate Orchestra (6 to 14 year olds), and the Young European Strings Chamber Orchestra (YESCO) under the direction of Ronald Masin.

=== Young European Strings Chamber Orchestra ===
The YES Chamber Orchestra (YESCO) was established alongside the school. Since 1991, the orchestra has won the Open Orchestra Cup at the Feis Ceoil national competition without interruption, and has performed regularly at the West Cork Chamber Music Festival over the years.

YESCO made its international debut with a concert tour of Finland in January 2001. A few years later, in 2006, the orchestra won the Achievement Award from the Irish Association of Youth Orchestras (IAYO). Notable competitive achievements followed in Vienna (2009), where they won first prize in the international Jugend und Musik competition. In 2015, they achieved another major success by winning first prize Summa Cum Laude at the 63rd International "Europees Muziekfestival" in Neerpelt, Belgium. Throughout its history, the orchestra has toured extensively across Europe, including Austria, Belgium, England, Finland, Germany, Hungary, Italy, Norway, Spain and Switzerland.

=== Commissioned works and recordings ===
The school has served as the platform for several world premieres of commissioned works, including the Dublin Concerto by Sándor Szokolay (1991), Musical Messages (1992), and works by Irish composer Raymond Deane, including the Five Piece Suite for Strings (2002) and A Baroque Session with Carolan and Friends (2009). A cross-genre collaboration with John Sheahan of The Dubliners, with Sheahan's melodies arranged by Irish composer Raymond Deane, resulted in the album The Marino Suite, launched at the Oak Room of the Mansion House, Dublin, in 2008. The school's most recent album release, Third Edition (2012), includes music by Mahler, Mozart, Tchaikovsky and the world premiere of Deane's Five Piece Suite.

== Teachers ==
Ronald Masin joined YES as Artistic Director in 2002 from the DIT Conservatory of Music and Drama and instructs students in the Senior Programme at the School. Maria Kelemen provides instruction in violin and viola for children up to the age of 11. The teaching faculty also includes violist Tanya Plavans, cellist Martin Johnson, section leader with the RTÉ National Symphony Orchestra; cellist Eoin Quinlan; and double bass player Mark Jenkins, Associate Principal with the RTÉ National Symphony Orchestra.

== Notable alumni ==
Past students of the YES School of Music include Gwendolyn Masin, violinist, author and director of the GAIA Chamber Music Festival; violinists Catherine Leonard and Gina Maria McGuinness; Martia Malherbe, violist with the Cape Philharmonic Orchestra, Niall O’Briain, former director of Newpark Music School, David O’Doherty, lecturer and head of orchestral studies of TU Dublin Conservatoire, violinist Cliodhna Ryan, a member of the Irish Chamber Orchestra, violinist Lynda O’Connor, teacher at the Royal Irish Academy of Music, and brothers Martin and Patrick Moriarty, freelance violist and cellist of the Paddington Trio respectively
