= Gabrieli Quartet =

The Gabrieli String Quartet is a well-known string quartet musical ensemble founded in 1966. It has a long residency association with Essex University, UK.

== Personnel ==
1st violin:

- Kenneth Sillito (1966-1986)
- John Georgiadis (1986-1990)
- Konstantin Stoianov (1993-1994)
- Yossi Zivoni (1995-2000)

2nd violin:

- Claire Simpson (1966-1969)
- Brendan O'Reilly (1969-2015)

viola

- Ian Jewel

cello

- Keith Harvey

== Origins and activities ==
The Quartet was founded and first performed in 1966. It has toured to Europe, North America, the Far East and Australia. In UK it performs at Aldeburgh Festival, the City of London Festival and the Cheltenham Festival. It also performs every year in the Mostly Mozart Festival of the London Barbican Centre. The Quartet have been resident artists at Essex University since 1971. They have given world premieres of works by William Alwyn, Benjamin Britten, Alan Bush, Daniel Jones, Gordon Crosse, Nicholas Maw, Panufnik and John McCabe. They also gave the British premiere of the Sibelius piano quintet. They have made many recordings.

Keith Harvey, cellist of the quartet, died on 28 April 2017, aged 79.
