= Talich Quartet =

Czech string quartet founded in 1964

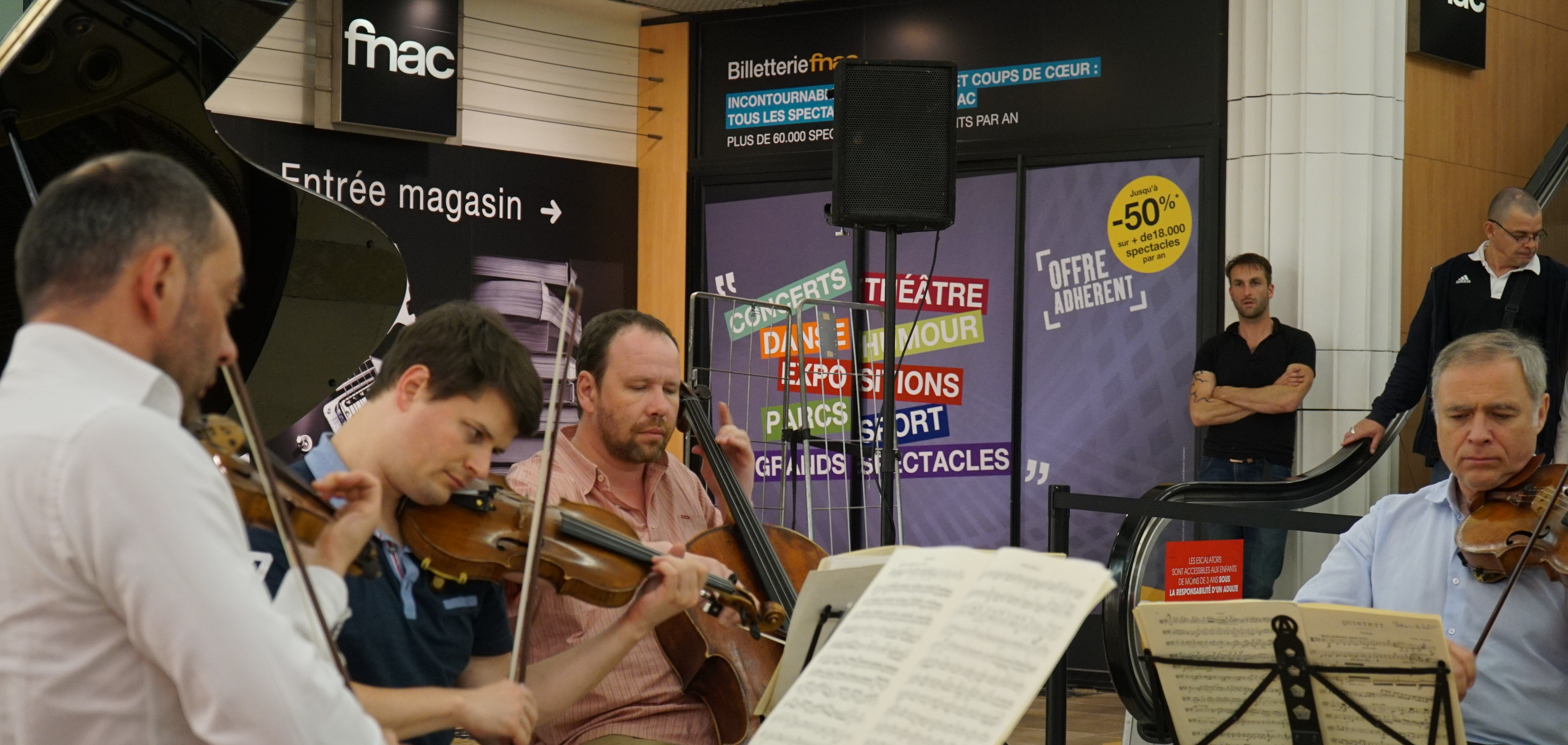
2015

The Talich Quartet (Czech: Talichovo kvarteto) is a Czech string quartet founded in 1964, which has won several Grand Prix du Disque awards.

== Members ==
Violin I

- Jan Talich, Sr. (founder, 1964–1970)
- Petr Messiereur (1970–1997)
- Jan Talich, Jr. (1997 to present)

Violin II

- Jan Kvapil (original, 1964–1994)
- Vladimir Bukač (1994–2000)
- Petr Maceček (2000 to 2011)
- Roman Patočka (2011 to present)

Viola

- Jiří Najnar (original, 1964–)
- Karel Doležal (until ?1970)
- Jan Talich, Sr. (?1970–2000)
- Vladimír Bukač (2000 to 2017)
- Radim Sedmidubský (2018 to present)

Cello

- Evžen Rattay (original, 1964–1997)
- Petr Prause (1997 to 2019)
- Michal Kaňka (2019 to present)

== Activities ==
The Talich Quartet was founded in 1964 by Jan Talich, Sr. (1945–2020) while still a student at Prague Conservatory, and named after his famous uncle Václav Talich (1883–1961), the conductor and founder of the Czech Philharmonic. They have performed at the Prague Spring International Music Festival and Casals Festival. Specializing in works by Czech composers, they have premièred works by Viktor Kalabis, Luboš Fišer and Luboš Sluka.

The quartet played for the first time in Paris on March 6 1975, with such success that they were invited to the United States in June 1976. However their North American debut is said to have been made in 1987.

They made many records for Calliope and at least one with Collins Classics. Their first Calliope recordings, of Dvořák String Quartets Opp. 61 and 96, and of the Mozart Clarinet Quintet with Bohuslav Zahradník and String Quartet, K 156, won the Grand Prix du Disque de l'Académie Charles Cros for 1977. Their intégrale (complete cycle) of Beethoven quartets was recorded between the late 1970s and the early 1980s. The Mozart recording, and the Beethoven String Quartets Opp. 127 and 135 (CAL 1640), both won Diapason d'or awards.
