= Cara O'Sullivan =

Irish singer (1962–2021)

Cara O'Sullivan (1962 – 26 January 2021) was an Irish coloratura soprano singer.

== Background ==
O'Sullivan grew up in The Lough, Cork. Both of her parents and her grandparents on both sides were singers, though not professionally. She is survived by 3 siblings, including sisters Aoife and Nuala. Nuala represented Cork at the Rose of Tralee in the 1980s. O'Sullivan had one daughter, Christine, an accountant. O'Sullivan lived in Frankfield, Cork. She was nicknamed "Caradiva" by her friends.

== Career ==
O'Sullivan's family noted that her voice began to develop at the age of 12. She attended the Cork School of Music, where O'Sullivan stated that at 17 the head of the school, Jack Murphy, told her parents: "She can go anywhere in the world, she can be anything she wants to be, she can go to the very top."

In her 20s, O'Sullivan took a break from singing for 4 years, returning to music after the birth of her daughter.

O'Sullivan achieved her first major role in 1996 at the age of 34, as Donna Anna in Don Giovanni with Welsh National Opera. The world renowned Australian soprano Dame Joan Sutherland helped O'Sullivan to prepare for the role. In 1997 and 1998, O'Sullivan starred as the Queen of the Night in the Opera North performances of The Magic Flute. The Daily Telegraph praised her "spirit and diamantine accuracy". She appeared on the 2008 anti-domestic violence charity album Sanctuary.

She also performed Così fan tutte, La traviata, Handel's Messiah, and Faust.

O'Sullivan's performances included:

- East Cork Choral Society
- English National Opera
- Everyman Palace Theatre
- Feis Maitiú Corcaigh
- Gaiety Theatre, Dublin
- Hibernian Orchestra
- National Concert Hall
- Opera Nantes
- Palau de la Música Catalana
- Paris Opera
- RTÉ Concert Orchestra
- St Patrick's Cathedral, Dublin
- Sydney Opera House
- Vlaamse Opera

In 2019, O'Sullivan received the inaugural Cork Culture Award by Lord Mayor of Cork, Mick Finn.

== Voice ==
O'Sullivan was a dramatic coloratura soprano. She has been described as a "fearsome coloratura" with "spitfire-like delivery".

== Health ==
Shortly before O'Sullivan was to begin rehearsals in Wales, she was diagnosed with cancer. The stage 2 leg tumour was discovered by her beautician during a waxing session. O'Sullivan had previously dismissed the lump as cellulite. The diagnosis did not affect her performances, as she received initial radiotherapy treatment in Ireland and then in Wales, continuing to work throughout, performing 20 times in 14 weeks. She suffered from insomnia.

O'Sullivan had nodules removed from her vocal cords at the private Blackheath Hospital, London. After the operation, she recuperated at Glenstal Abbey, where she was completely silent for one week.

In 2018, O'Sullivan was diagnosed with early-onset dementia which led to her retirement from professional singing. Celebratory concerts were organised in her honour in Cork and Dublin.

On 26 January 2021, it was announced that Cara O'Sullivan had died. Her death was marked by an outpouring of tributes to her talent and her outstanding contribution to music in Ireland and internationally, with The Irish Independent stating that "[Ms O'Sullivan] was famed for her support of charitable events - and her sense of humour."

== Legacy ==
Following O'Sullivan's death, Cork Opera House announced plans to launch a programme in her memory designed to provide a platform to operatic singers in her name.

The Cara O'Sullivan Associate Artists programme was founded in O'Sullivan's memory to honour her contribution to her art form and acknowledge the great love her audience had for her. By honouring her life and work, Cork Opera House hopes to contribute significantly to the future of opera in Cork city so that future generations can benefit from the legacy she left in her wake. Among the objectives of this programme is to offer a platform to early career / emerging Irish opera artists for repertoire / role development, concert performances with orchestra, semi-staged performances and the curation of recital programmes that meets with their current and future repertoire ambitions.

2021-2023 Associate Artists Emma Nash - Soprano Rachel Croash - Soprano Gavan Ring - Tenor Rory Musgrave - Baritone

2023-2025 Associate Artists Kelli-Ann Masterson - Soprano Niamh O'Sullivan - Mezzo Soprano Dean Power - Tenor Rory Dunne - Bass Baritone
