= Harry Whalley =

Northern-Ireland composer based in Scotland

Harry Whalley (born 1984) is a Belfast-born composer based in Scotland whose output includes classical music, jazz, and film music.

== Life and career ==
Whalley studied composition with Malcolm Edmonstone and later with Nigel Osborne and Peter Nelson and was awarded a PhD in 2014. His music has been performed by the Hebrides Ensemble, Artisan Trio, Red Note Ensemble, Vancouver Miniaturists Ensemble, Gildas Quartet, Edinburgh Quartet, Ensemble Eunoia and music for film at Palm Spring, Los Angeles, Berlin, and London.

In 2012, he was a winner of the West Cork Chamber Music Festival competition in composition for his string quartet Compression, which was performed by the Gildas Quartet and run as a master class with Thomas Larcher before its premiere. Harry Whalley is course leader in Music Composition and technology at the University for the Creative Arts.

== Selected works ==
- Seven Rocks (2014), for string quartet
- Entangled Music (2013)
- Clasp Together, Beta (2012)
- Little Harmonic Labyrinth, video installation – Summerhall
