= New Ross Piano Festival =

Coordinates: 52.3962°N 6.9409°W

The New Ross Piano Festival is an Irish festival of classical music which takes place annually in the County Wexford town of New Ross. The festival began in 2006 and features music for piano, whether as a solo instrument or as part of a chamber music ensemble.

== Beginnings ==
The festival grew out of the activities of a group of local music enthusiasts, known as Music for New Ross. Since 1995 they had been organising live concerts in the New Ross area, which usually involved the hire of a grand piano. In 2005, they decided to develop a series of concerts around the hired piano and the idea of a festival was born. The first festival opened on 29 September 2006 with a performance of Ludwig van Beethoven's Moonlight Sonata given by Hugh Tinney.

== Organisation ==
The festival takes place over the course of four days at the end of September each year. The main venue is St. Mary's Church, New Ross. Since the festival began, the artistic director has been Irish pianist, Finghin Collins. His policy is to feature several of the guest pianists in each concert so audiences can experience the range of talent on offer without necessarily attending every event. As well as presenting established artists, the festival also provides opportunities for students and up-and-coming performers to take part in master classes and recitals.

== Music and musicians ==
The festival encompasses a wide repertoire ranging from the baroque period to the twenty-first century. In 2011, a second grand piano was added and this allowed the inclusion of works for four and eight hands - in the latter case a transcription of Gioachino Rossini's William Tell Overture.

A number of compositions have been premièred in New Ross. In 2009, Finghin Collins gave the first performance in Ireland of Bertrand Dubedout's Vrishti. The 2011 programme included the world première of Belfast-born composer Stephen Gardner's Two Guys walk into a Piano Bar in a performance by Finghin Collins and Charles Owen.

Among the other artists who have played at the festival since its inception are Freddy Kempf, John O'Conor, Cristina Ortiz, Kathryn Stott and Piers Lane.
