= Yossi Zivoni =

Yossi Zivoni (Hebrew: יוסי סיבוני; born Joseph Krasilshikoff) is a violinist, born in Tel Aviv of parents, both of whom were doctors. His middle-class upbringing instilled in him a passion for music and he began to play the flute. At the age of six, while playing his flute on the balcony of his house, he attracted the attention of the violin teacher Rivka Minkova, who immediately knocked on the door and proposed violin lessons. After six months of playing on a quarter size violin, Yossi gave his first public performance in Tel Aviv.

Zivoni went on to study with Odeon Partos, under whom he attended and graduated from the Jerusalem Academy of Music and Dance. Zivoni then studied at the Brussels Conservatoire under André Gertler, from where he graduated with the highest honours. By now he had already been a winner at the Paganini Competition In Genoa, the Bavarian Radio Competition in Munich, and the Queen Elisabeth Competition in Brussels in 1963. He made his concert debut at Amsterdam in 1964. Yossi toured extensively over the world and has played concertos with leading orchestras and conductors. Yossi currently lives in London with his wife Jeanne, formerly herself a leading mezzo-soprano.

As a chamber musician, Zivoni led the Gabrieli Quartet from 1995 to 2000 and formed the Zivoni Quartet in 2004. Zivoni has taught at the Royal Northern College of Music from 1968 and at the Royal College of Music as a Professor from 1997. Between 1990 and 1996 he was artistic director at the Entrecasteaux International Music Festival in Provence. He is frequently a jury member of international competitions, including recently the Andrea Postacchini Competition in Fermo, Italy in 2015. He is currently principally a Professor and dedicates most of his time to teaching.
