= Feis Maitiú Corcaigh =

Feis Maitiú Corcaigh is an International Festival Member of the British and International Federation of Festivals. The annual event is hosted at Fr Mathew Hall, a 400-seat auditorium in Cork city, Ireland. Feis Maitiú Corcaigh runs for nine weeks, throughout which almost 15,000 participants take to the stage to compete in a range of artistic disciplines. The festival takes place annually from the end of January to the start of April, with the various sections rotating annually within that time frame. Feis Maitiú Corcaigh is the second largest festival of its type in the world, second only to the Hong Kong Schools Speech Festival.

Feis Maitiú Corcaigh is grant aided by the Department of Education and Science with funding from the National Lottery.

== History ==
Feis Maitiú Corcaigh was first established in 1927 by Fr Micheál O’Shea, O.F.M. Cap., a local Capuchin who saw the need for a platform to help and encourage people interested in the performing arts. Cork's inaugural Feis ran for a duration of four days, with records showing in the region of 300 participants. Father Mathew Hall was chosen as the venue for the Feis, the 400-seat auditorium having held the honour throughout the Festival's existence. The Festival's founder became its first President, and while sparsely populated records fail to produce exact dates, it is believed that the position was held by an Fr Micheál for approximately 12 years, or four terms. Fr Micheál was succeeded as President of the Feis by Fr Maurice O'Dowd, who was the predecessor to Fr Matthew Flynn's tenure, during which the first Cork Drama Festival was launched by the then Lord Mayor of Cork, Michael Sheehan. This festival, which has since ceased, was first hosted at Father Mathew Hall, and ran for a fortnight under the adjudication of Ria Mooney and Seán Neeson, the former of which was Principal of the Gaiety Theatre School of Acting.

Fr Nessan Shaw took over from Fr Matthew as president, and alongside Claire O'Halloran, a local teacher, formed the Cork Children's Theatre, later renamed the Cork Youth Theatre, in an effort to further develop the dramatic arts amongst Cork's youth. The group's first production in November 1969, which involved 38 primary school pupils, was the first of many to be both rehearsed and performed at Father Mathew Hall. Up until the early '70s, the Feis had contributed to the development of many tertiary projects, such as the Cork Drama Festival, Cork Youth Theatre and Cór Fhéile, but it was during this decade that the festival really began to progress in its own right.

Under the direction of Br Paul O'Donovan, who took over after Fr Senan Dooley's term as president, the Festival became an International Member of the British and International Federation of Festivals for Music, Dance and Speech. As a result, Feis Maitiú, Corcaigh has always enjoyed the company of the world's finest adjudicators. Over the years, many internationally renowned adjudicators have presided at the Festival, most notably Sir Arnold Bax, the famed English composer and poet who is now buried at St Finbarr's Cemetery. Records from 1976, the Festival's 50th anniversary, indicate that there was in the region of 8,000 participants. From here, Feis Maitiú Corcaigh continued to flourish, with almost 12,000 performers registering in 1985. By now, the Festival had been extended to six weeks, and classes in a range of disciplines, including those that were instrumental, had been established. In 1994, Br Paul stepped down as head of the Feis after an unprecedented 25 years in office. In an effort to continue the remarkable rate at which the Feis had advanced, the Capuchin Order took the decision to seek Br Paul's replacement from outside their ranks, something which had never before been done. This search led them to Timothy McCarthy.

Over the years, Feis Maitiú Corcaigh has been proud to welcome a considerable number of high-profile dignitaries to Father Mathew Hall. In 1984, the sixth President of Ireland, Dr Patrick Hillery, performed the official opening, and in doing so, paid tribute to the great cultural contribution that the Feis makes to the people of this island. 1994, the final year of Br Paul O'Donovan's tenure, coincided with a visit from Dr Hillery's successor, Mary Robinson. Other dignitaries to have made an address at the Hall include former Taoisigh, Charles Haughey and John Bruton. Former ministers include the then Minister for Communications, Jim Mitchell, the then Minister for the Gaeltacht, Tom O'Donnell, as well as Brian Lenihan Snr and Dick Spring, both of whom served as Tánaiste. Current leader of Fianna Fáil, Micheál Martin, has held a long affiliation with the Feis, and during his term in office, was instrumental in securing the state funding necessary to ensure the Festival's continued existence.

== Artistic disciplines ==
The festival is broken into a number of sections: speech and drama, vocal and instrumental. The festival caters to performers of all ages, but is particularly popular amongst those students and teachers involved in primary, secondary and third-level music and dramatic education.

The various sections at Feis Maitiú Corcaigh are categorised as follows, representing a wide range of artistic disciplines:

English Singing and Choirs
Instrumental Music and School Bands
Ceol agus Amhránaíocht Traidisiúnta
Speech & Drama
Labhairt na Filíocht agus Míreanna Drámaíochta

The Festival also hosts a Victorian Evening, which consists of verse, prose, music, and song from the Victorian and Edwardian periods.

== Officials ==
The head of the festival is the Administrator, a position currently held by Timothy McCarthy. Timothy is the festival's first Administrator to be appointed from outside of the Capuchin Order. He was appointed in 1995. Timothy is an Adjudicator-Member of the British and International Federation of Festivals for Music, Dance and Speech for whom he has given presentations at Federation Conferences. He is a member of the Society of Teachers' of Speech and Drama, the Irish Institute of Drama and Communication and the Drama League of Ireland. He has adjudicated at Festivals in Ireland, the UK, Isle of Man, Jersey, Zimbabwe, Sri Lanka and Hong Kong with examining tours to South Africa, Singapore, Malaysia, India, Australia and New Zealand.

Feis Maitiú Corcaigh's administrator is assisted by the festival's executive board and advisory board, the latter of which is composed of experts in the various performing arts. Originally, the head of the Feis had been referred to as president, but the title was changed to administrator at the beginning of Timothy McCarthy's tenure in the mid-90s.

Title	Name	Term
President & Founder	Fr Micheál O'Shea	1927–1939
President	Fr Matthew Flynn	NA
President	Fr Nessan Shaw	NA
President	Fr Senan Dooley	NA
President	Br Paul O'Donovan	1973–1995
Administrator	Timothy McCarthy	1995–present

== Media profile ==
Through its partnership with the Evening Echo, an award-winning regional newspaper in Cork, Feis Maitiú Corcaigh has garnered a media profile that few other festivals in the Federation enjoy. The newspaper carries daily reports from the festival, and prints an annual supplement containing photographs from throughout the event. This supplement has previously won a major European media award. Each year a resident journalist is appointed to the festival by the publication. One of only two awards to have been presented at the inaugural Feis is the Echo Perpetual Shield. The trophy, which is till on offer today, was donated by the Evening Echo back in 1927.

== International affiliations ==
In addition to being an International Festival Member of the British and International Federation of Festivals, Cork's Feis has fostered strong ties with the Sri Lanka Festival of Music, Dance and Speech. Founded in 1998 by Joy Ferdinando, the Sri Lankan Festival has over 13000 participants, who perform over a three-month period across 36 cities. So widespread is the event, that between May and July, appointed adjudicators travel somewhere in the region of 21,000 kilometres. Feis Maitiú Administrator, Tim McCarthy, directed a production at the festival in Sri Lanka back in 2006 and 2007. In 2010, Joy Ferdinando visited Feis Maitiú Corcaigh, and gave an address at University College Cork. During her visit, Timothy McCarthy stated that: "The work of festivals the world over is the same. The concerns and problems are the same. The participants are the same. It is good for us to connect on an international level with similar organisations and make our world a better place. We are all the better for these links".

Feis Maitiú Corcaigh has been a valuable resource in the development of its Sri Lankan counterpart. The relatively young Sri Lankan festival is able to call on the experience of the now 85-year-old Cork Feis. This has proved invaluable throughout its tumultuous beginnings. Because of the country's economic climate, securing sponsorship is not possible, and they do not receive any state funding. In fact, the festival receives no external funding, relying solely on those attending performances for income. Feis Maitiú Corcaigh shares this difficulty in many respects, but the burden is eased somewhat through grant aid from the Department of Education and Science with funding from the National Lottery. While such considerations are a constant across cultural festivals the world over, the Sri Lankan festival has also had to overcome a unique set of challenges, namely the Sri Lankan Civil War, and the Asian tsunami in 2004. The Civil War came about in 1983 when a separatist militant group known as the Liberation Tigers of Tamil Eelam looked to create an independent state. The summer of 2010 saw the Sri Lankan government claim an end to the violence and the defeat of the separatists after almost three decades of violence. During the fighting, the festival was restricted in where its performances could be located, but its continuation provided a much needed distraction for the nation's citizens.

== Notable performers ==
A number of notable artists have performed at Feis Maitiú Corcaigh, including:

- Finbar Wright
- Cara O'Sullivan
- Fiona Shaw
- Nyle Wolfe
- Cathal Dunne
