= Feis Ceoil =

Irish music organization

Feis Ceoil ([fʲɛʃ ˈcoːlʲ] fesh-k'yole; "Festival of Music") is an Irish music organisation which holds an annual competitive festival of classical music. It was first organised in Dublin in 1897 by Dr. Annie Patterson and Edward Martyn for the purpose of stimulating musical studies in Ireland and encouraging native performers and composers. It was a result of the general Gaelicising programme of the Gaelic League. It consisted of competitions for performance and composition and was supported by all musicians of the day, both traditional and classical. Prizes aggregating £800 were distributed among the successful competitors.

Since those early years, the Feis Ceoil has undergone many changes to accommodate the development of music in Ireland. It has expanded to more than 185 competitions in all instruments, including voice, and covering all ages from 7 years upwards. Famous competitors over the festival's history include tenor John McCormack, author James Joyce (as a singer), tenor Finbar Wright, broadcaster Seán Óg Ó Ceallacháin, the Irish composers Ailbhe McDonagh (as a cellist and pianist), Vincent Kennedy (as a trumpet player) and Robert O'Dwyer, and violinist Cora Venus Lunny.

Performers have included Margaret Burke Sheridan, Suzanne Murphy, Bernadette Greevy, Eithne Robinson, Hugh Tinney, Philip Martin, John O'Conor, John Ronayne, Emma Murphy, Geraldine O'Grady, Ann Murray, Mary Hegarty, Cara O'Sullivan, Celine Byne, Orla Boylan, Finghin Collins, Gwendolyn Masin, Cora Venus Lunny, Tara Erraught, Joseph Dalton, Ailbhe McDonagh, and Claudia Boyle.

In 2021 the competition had to be run online due to the COVID-19 pandemic with all entrants submitting their pieces via the website.
