= Rudolf Werthen =

Belgian violinist, conductor and teacher

Rudolf Werthen is a Belgian violinist, conductor and teacher. He is the founder and artistic director of the orchestra I Fiamminghi and was chief conductor of the symphonic orchestra of the Flemish Opera in 1989. He has taught at the Royal Conservatory of Ghent since 1975.

Werthen was born in Mechelen, Belgium and was tutored by André Gertler and Henryk Szeryng.

== Awards and recognition ==
Queen Elisabeth Music Competition

- 1971 Laureate 7th Prize Violin
- 1985 Jury Violin
