= Ioana Petcu-Colan =

Irish violinist of Romanian origin (born 1978)

- Born: January 1978 (age 48); Cork, Ireland
- Occupation: Violinist
- Parent(s): Adrian Petcu; Ruxandra Colan-Petcu

Ioana Petcu-Colan is an Irish violinist of Romanian origin, currently living in Bangor, County Down, Northern Ireland.

== Biography ==
Ioana Petcu-Colan, born in January 1978 in Cork, Ireland is the daughter of Adrian Petcu and of Ruxandra Colan-Petcu, both her parents being musicians. Ioana started studying violin with her father, Adrian Petcu, continuing at the Conservatoire de Nantes where, age 16, she obtained the "Premier Prix á l'Unanimité" . She continued her studies in the United Kingdom at the Royal Academy of Music where she was awarded a first class honors Bachelor of Music degree. She returned to Ireland where she received a First Class Master of Arts degree at the Cork School of Music. She has studied with musicians such as Hermann Krebbers, Mauricio Fuks, Lydia Mordkovitch, Erich Gruenberg, Mariana Sîrbu, Gregory Ellis, and Pierre Wallez. Ferenz Radosc coached her as chamber musician.

Ioana Petcu-Colan is an established violinist, and from 2010 to the present (2022) Associate Leader of the Ulster Orchestra. She plays on an Italian violin, built by Goffredo Cappa in 1695. Her performances as soloist include the violin concertos of Antonio Vivaldi, Ludwig van Beethoven, Wolfgang Amadeus Mozart, Max Bruch, Camille Saint-Saëns, Édouard Lalo, Sergei Prokofiev, Aram Khachaturian, Dmitri Shostakovich, Henryk Wieniawski, Jean Sibelius and Pablo de Sarasate, the Concerto for violin, piano and string quartet by Ernest Chausson as well as the concertos by Johann Sebastian Bach performed both on modern and baroque violin, performing under the batons of William Eddins, Niklas Willen, James Lockhart, David Brophy, Neil Thomson, Proinnsias O'Duinn and Robert Houlihan. She also premiered "Elastic Harmonic" for Violin and Orchestra by Irish composer Donnacha Dennehy on Irish national television.

Ioana Petcu-Colan is also very involved in chamber music. She is a founder and former first violin of the Callino String Quartet which first performed at the West Cork Chamber Music Festival in 1999, and also included Sarah Sexton (second violin), Samantha Hutchins (viola) and Sarah McMahon (cello).

As a chamber musician, she has performed at London's Wigmore Hall, Dublin's National Concert Hall and Manchester's Bridgewater Hall and at many international festivals – Cheltenham, Ryedale, Bergen, Heidelberger Frühling, West Cork Chamber Music Festival, Kilkenny Arts Festival, Clandeboye, Sligo New Music Festival and others. She has formed a successful duo with Elizabeth Cooney performing rarely heard violin duo repertoire in dynamic and diverse performances, exploring works ranging from the baroque to the contemporary by Jean Delphin Alard, Darius Milhaud, Henryk Wieniawski, Béla Bartók, Alfred Schnittke, Sergei Prokofiev, George Enescu, Paul Constantinescu and Jackie McLean or works for two violins and piano by Johann Sebastian Bach, César Franck, Alfred Schnittke, Bohuslav Martinů, Eugène Ysaÿe, Anton Arensky, Dmitri Shostakovich, Pablo de Sarasate, Erich Wolfgang Korngold, Gabriel Fauré and Jean Françaix.

In duo partnership she had performed the complete Beethoven Piano and Violin Sonata cycle and has performed most of the major duo repertoire extensively. She was a member of the Irish Chamber Orchestra, and is currently a member of the Ensemble Avalon.

Ioana Petcu-Colan has a great interest in promoting contemporary music. Composer Ronan Guilfoyle wrote a special work for her, "Ferdinand the Bull" for violin and narrator, first performed at the Triskel Arts Centre in Cork. She then performed with Izumi Kumura the world premiere of Guilfoyle's Violin and piano sonata No. 2. She recently participated in the recording of Guilfoyle's "Septet for string quartet, bass, drums and guitar".

Ioana Petcu-Colan has also edited a universal edition publication of accessible solo violin pieces by eminent contemporary composers Arvo Pärt, Ennio Morricone and others. The publication is intended primarily for younger players and those new to contemporary music.

== Personal life ==
Ioana Petcu-Colan is married to a trombonist, Ross Lyness, and has two young daughters.
