= Hungarian school of violin playing =

The Hungarian violin school started with Jòzsef Joseph Böhm, when in 1819 he began to teach the first violin class of Vienna's Conservatory. Böhm studied in Budapest, with his father, and with Pierre Rode (probably when he was in Russia), so he is the link between the French school (an evolution of the Italian school through Viotti) and the Hungarian one.

== Böhm's classes ==
Böhm's classes gave birth to the following Hungarian violinists: Joseph Joachim, Grün, Auer, Flesch, (Tivadar Nachez), Hubay; and to violinists of other nationalities as: Hellmesberger, Jacob Dont, Ernst, Ferdinand Laub, Franz Kneisel and Karl Klingler. The importance: Joachim will teach in Berlin, Auer in Russia and in America, Flesch in Switzerland and England, Hellmesberger and Dont in Vienna, Hubay in Brussels and Budapest, Laub in Russia, Klingler in Germany and Kneisel in America. Among the violinists who were pupils in the Budapest academy, created by Hubay, we find: Tibor Varga (director of Sion academy), André Gertler (head of string-department in Brussels), Joseph Szigeti (head of string-department in Budapest), Sandor Vegh (director of the Mozarteum), Ilona Feher (teacher of Shlomo Mintz in Tel Aviv), Oskar Back (founder of Amsterdam's school), Béla Katona. Someone will perhaps have heard about Kato Havas, Géza Szilvay, Paul Rolland, Robert Gerle or Shinichi Suzuki. The first four have studied in Budapest academy in the same cultural atmosphere and with the same technique. Suzuki studied in Berlin with Klingler (Joachim's pupil). These violinists are mentioned because of their fame, but they are part of a long list of key-persons in world musical life coming from the Hungarian school. the way from Karl Klingler also leads to Alphonse Brun, Alfred Ellenberger in Switzerland.

Kato Havas is author of the book "Stage fright" in which all the problems of posture are faced. Sensitive to these problems, Rolland has created the violin school system in the U.S. and collaborated with F. Matthias Alexander. Silvay organized the string-department in Helsinki "Sibelius" academy. Gerle collaborated with Rolland and Havas and worked in U.S. It must be told that in Budapest academy there is a violin pedagogy class since the year of its foundation in 1875. Since then it is collecting the elements of the violin playing tradition and those of researchers. Very big importance is given to pedagogy and to its diffusion.
