= Lorenzo Carcassi =

Florentine instrument maker

Lorenzo Carcassi was a 1700s Florentine instrument maker. He often worked with his younger sibling and business partner, Tomaso Carcassi.

He and Tomaso were probably students of Giovanni Baptista Gabrielli, another Florentine instrument maker. His instruments are played to this day by artists including Gwendolyn Masin (a violin from 1761) and Vito Paternoster (a violoncello from 1792).
