= Panufnik =

Panufnik is a Polish surname. Notable people with the surname include:

- Andrzej Panufnik (1914–1991), Polish composer and conductor
- Roxanna Panufnik (born 1968), British composer, daughter of Andrzej
