= Hubay =

Hubay is a Hungarian surname. Notable people with the surname include:

- Ilona Hubay (1902–1982), Hungarian specialist in ancient books
- Jenő Hubay (1858–1937), Hungarian violinist, composer and music teacher
