= André Gertler =

Hungarian classical violinist and teacher

André Gertler (26 July 1907 – 23 July 1998) was a Hungarian classical violinist and teacher. Professor at the Royal Conservatory of Brussels (1940–1977), Professor at the Cologne Academy of Music (1954–1957), Professor at the College of Music in Hannover (1964), founder and leader of the Gertler Quartet.

== Biography ==
Andre Gertler (Hungarian name Gertler Endre) was born in Budapest, Hungary. The talent for arts manifested in his family in several fields: one of his two brothers, Pál Gertler, became a painter while Viktor Gertler was a famous movie director in Hungary.

He started his violin studies at the age of six in Budapest, finishing it at the Franz Liszt Academy of Music with a degree recital in 1925, where his teachers were József Bloch, Oszkár Studer, Jenő Hubay, Leo Weiner (chamber music), and Zoltán Kodály (composition).

As many other Hubay-students neither did Gertler continue his career in Hungary, He settled in Brussels in 1928, with recommendations of his teachers, where he could improve his technique by Eugène Ysaÿe. After his first concerts in Brussels followed several concert engagements in Belgium, Netherlands, Switzerland, France and in Italy. He became a teacher at the Royal Conservatory of Brussels, in Belgium. He founded the Gertler Quartett with the young violinist Baumann in 1931, leading his quartet he toured the world's stages for two decades (1931-1951). They performed yearly in Budapest between 1932 and 1936, including Bartók's quartets among others in their programs.

His reputation in Belgium is shown by the fact, that already in 1937 he was a member of the Jury of the Queen Elisabeth Competition in Brussels, but he was on the jury of several other international competitions, the Henryk Wieniawski Violin Competition in 1952. (Poznan), where he made the acquaintance of the first prize winner Igor Oistrakh he tied to him a lifelong friendship.

He was married to the Danish pianist Diane Andersen, with whom he regularly concertized and recorded.

== Commitment to contemporary music ==
Although there were professional tensions between his master, the conservatively inclined Hubay and the progressively minded Bartók, both his master and Bartók's music were destined to play a major role in the activities of Gertler. His real debut at the Franz Liszt Academy of Music had been done some months before his degree recital. The program of this concert anticipated his commitment to the contemporary music: two new Swiss works, Violin Concerto of Hermann Suter and Volkmar Andreae's Rhapsody.

Gertler was a great admirer of Béla Bartók. He recorded the complete violin works of the composer for the Supraphon label, including his two concertos, that was awarded Grand Prix du Disque in Paris (1967). He is considered one of the best players of Bartók's music. His recording of the 44 duos for violins, with Josef Suk, is considered one of the best versions available. Bartók and Gertler met first in connection with the transcribing of the Sonatina for violin and piano presumably in 1926, learning at first hand the composer's performance intentions for his own music. Bartók and Gertler gave concerts together, first at Papa (Hungary) in 1937, after it in Antwerp and Brussels in 1938. He premiered the Violin Concerto No. 1 - composed for Stefi Geyer by the young Bartók - in Budapest in 1960, and it was also he who premiered both Violin Concertos of Bartók in Paris, as well as the Sonata for Solo Violin in London.

He kept several masterworks of the twentieth century constantly on his repertoire. Gertler premiered the Violin Concerto of Alban Berg in Budapest (1948) being unknown at that time there, and later he became well known in England - particularly for his performances of Alban Berg's Violin Concerto both in the concert hall and for broadcasting.

Recordings of the Hungarian immigrant composer, Mátyás Seiber: Fantasia concertante, Rezső Kókai: Violin concerto, Béla Tardos: Sonata is proving his commitment to the Hungarian music.

He made the acquaintance of many of the twentieth century’s composers, as Igor Stravinsky, Darius Milhaud, Paul Hindemith and Karl Amadeus Hartmann.

== Teaching ==
Gertler had a respectable career as a pedagogue, as well. He joined the staff of the Royal Conservatory of Brussels in 1940, first as chamber music professor, he was appointed the professor of violin a few years later - a post he held until the age of 70. In 1954, he became the professor at the Cologne Academy of Music for three years and ten years later, in 1964, he received a professorship at the College of Music in Hannover.

Graham Whettam commemorates the music pedagogue Gertler as „Andre Gertler was part of a link stretching back through only one intermediary teacher to another celebrated Hungarian, the violinist Joseph Joachim, and through him directly to Felix Mendelssohn.”

He shared his experiences in his home country – he was a permanent guest professor of the International Bartók Seminars in Budapest and then in Szombathely.

Among his foremost students were Joshua Epstein, Rudolf Werthen, Yair Kless, André Rieu, Yossi Zivoni, Carola Nasdala, Hedwig Pirlet-Reiners, Maria Kelemen, Bernardo Bessler, Michel Bessler, Nilla Pierrou, Daphne Godson, Jose Francisco Del Castillo, Felix Forrer.

== In the Jury ==
- Queen Elisabeth International Music Competition of Belgium in Brussels,
- Paganini Competition in Genoa (Italy)
- Henryk Wieniawski Violin Competition in Poznan (Poland)
- Geneva International Music Competition (Switzerland)
- Vianna da Motta International Music Competition (Portugal)
- Enescu Competition in Bucharest (Romania)
- Bartók Competition in Budapest (Hungary)
- Sibelius Competition in Helsinki (Finland)
- Curci International Competition in Naples (Italy)
- London International Violin Competition Flesch (UK)

== Awards ==
- Commander of Order of Leopold II (Belgium)
- Officer of Order of Leopold II (Belgium)
- Knight of Order of Leopold II (Belgium)
- Order of Merit of the Federal Republic of Germany
- Chevaliers of the Ordre des Arts et des Lettres (France)
- Order of Pro Cultura Hungarica (Hungary)
- Honorary Member of the Royal Academy of Music (England)
