= Tomaso Carcassi =

Italian instrument maker

Tomaso Carcassi was a 1700s Florentine instrument maker. He often worked with his older sibling and business partner, Lorenzo Carcassi.

He and Lorenzo were probably students of Giovanni Baptista Gabrielli, another Florentine instrument maker.
