= Jan Talich =

Czech violinist and conductor

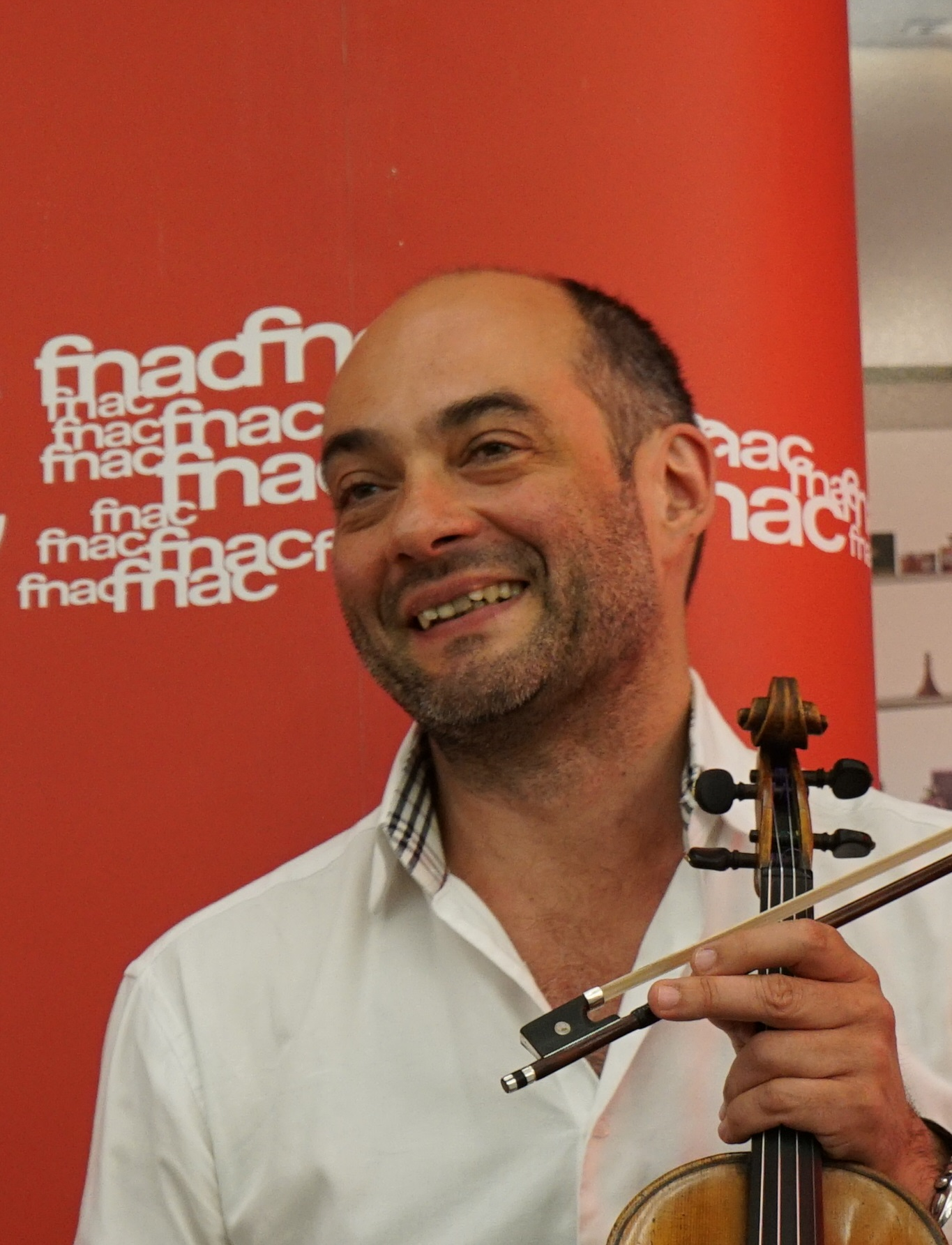
Jan Talich

Jan Talich, Jr. (born 11 March 1967 in Prague) is a Czech violinist and conductor.

Talich studied at the Prague Conservatory and later at the Prague Academy of Music under Václav Snítil. He received scholarships to further his education in both the US with Shmuel Ashkenasi and then with Yfrah Neaman at the Guildhall School of Music in England. In 1989 he won 1st prize at the Václav Huml International Violin Competition in Zagreb, which launched his international solo career, playing with orchestras and giving recitals throughout Europe and the USA. Jan Talich has recorded several solo CDs of Czech music, as well as Beethoven and Mozart concertos. He regularly gives masterclasses both at home and abroad: in Telč, Dijon, Angers, Prades and the Conservatoire Superieur in Paris. With the Talich Quartet, founded by his uncle, Jan Talich, Sr. (1945-2020), he has performed to great acclaim, regularly touring the major venues of Japan, South America, Mexico and South Korea. As well as conducting his own orchestra since its foundation he has, in the last few years, begun to broaden his career as a conductor. He is now increasingly asked to work as a guest conductor with many other orchestras in the Czech Republic and abroad. Since 2008/09 he has been chief conductor of South Bohemian Chamber Philharmonic (Jihočeská komorní filharmonie). Jan Talich plays violins by J. Gagliana (1780) and A. Stradivarius (1729).
