= Finghin Collins =

Irish pianist and artistic director

Finghin Collins is an Irish pianist. He won first prize at the Clara Haskil International Piano Competition in Vevey, Switzerland, in 1999. Collins was artist-in-residence at Waterford Institute of Technology from 2005 to 2009, and has also acted as artistic director for the New Ross Piano Festival.

== Studies and competitions ==
Collins studied with John O'Conor at the Royal Irish Academy of Music in Dublin and with Dominique Merlet at the Conservatoire de Musique in Geneva, Switzerland. He was awarded a Bachelor of Arts in Music Performance from Dublin City University in 1999 and a premier prix avec distinction from the Conservatoire in Geneva in 2002. He won the RTÉ Musician of the Future Competition in Dublin in 1994, as well as semi-final prizes at the Leeds International Piano Competition in 1996, the Guardian Dublin International Piano Competition in 1997, and the Classical Category at the National Entertainment Awards in Ireland in 1998. In 1999, Collins won the top prize at the Clara Haskil International Piano Competition.

== Performances ==
According to his website, Collins has performed with such orchestras as the Chicago Symphony Orchestra, Houston Symphony Orchestra, and Royal Philharmonic Orchestra; with such conductors as Christoph Eschenbach and Hans Graf; with ensembles such as London Winds and the Aviv, Callino, Chilingirian, and other string quartets.
