= West Cork Chamber Music Festival =

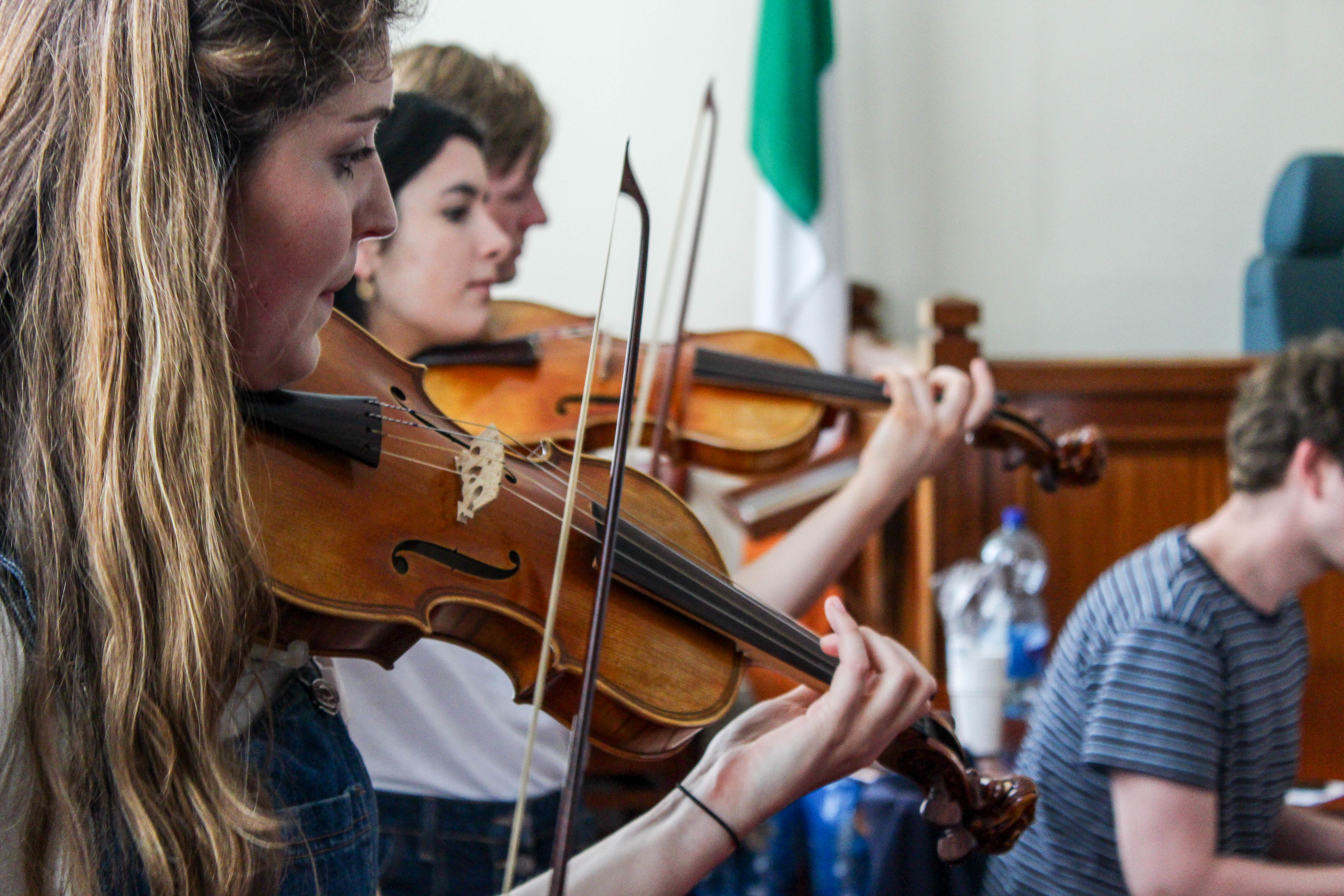
Westland Baroque Ensemble at West Cork Chamber Music Festival 2018

The West Cork Chamber Music Festival is a chamber music festival, established in 1995, in the town of Bantry in West Cork, Ireland. It takes place over ten days in June and July each year.

== Background ==
The festival was founded by Francis Humphrys, the programme director and the CEO of West Cork Music (WCM). WCM runs the West Cork Chamber Music Festival.

Performers who have previously contributed to the festival include the RTÉ Vanbrugh Quartet, Barry Douglas, Nicola Benedetti, Tanja Becker-Bender and Natalie Clein. Presented works have included some by contemporary composers, such as Thomas Larcher.

== Venues and activities ==
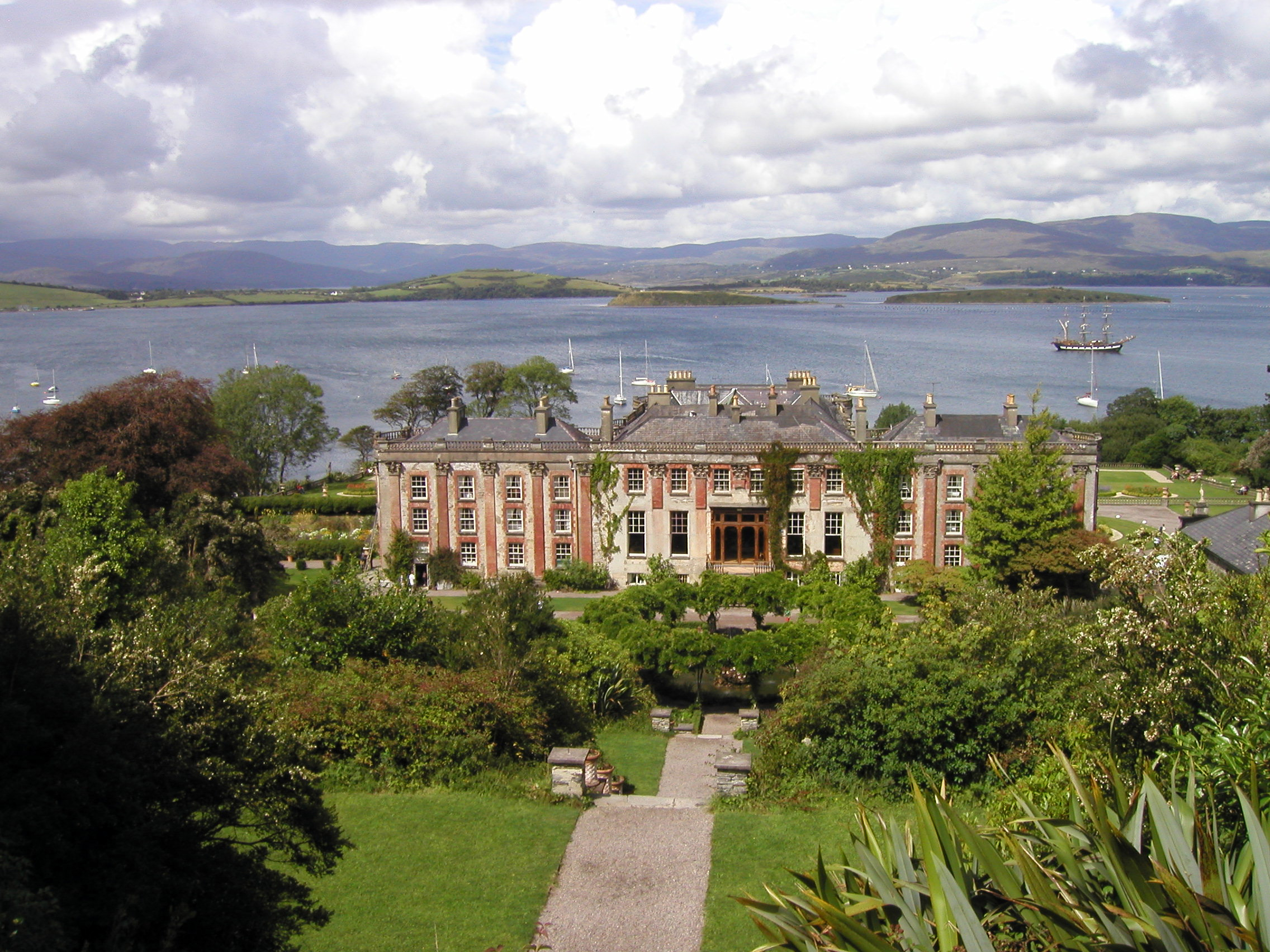
Bantry House has been a central venue for the West Cork Chamber Music Festival

Festival performances take place at venues around the town, including Bantry House and St Brendan's Church. The festival's fringe events take place at locations including Whiddy, Sherkin, Bere and Heir islands.

Previous festivals have included original commissioned works, presentations on violin and bow making, and masterclasses for young chamber musicians. West Cork Music also runs an annual composition competition, with past winners including Harry Whalley, Sebastian Adams and Solfa Carlisle. The organisation has also held competitions for young composers.
