= List of protected heritage sites in Fernelmont =

This table shows an overview of the protected heritage sites in the Walloon municipality of Fernelmont. This list is part of Belgium's national heritage.

Object	Year/architect	Town/section	Address	Coordinates	Number^{?}	Image
Tumuli of Seron and the ensemble formed by the three tumuli called Campagne des Tombes and their environment ^{(fr)}		Forville		50.594361°N 5.008764°E	92138-CLT-0003-01 Info	
Ensemble formed by the church of Saint-Remi, graveyard, rectory and their environment, to Franc-Waret ^{(fr)}		Franc-Waret		50.520064°N 4.977619°E	92138-CLT-0004-01 Info	
Chateau Franc-Waret ^{(fr)}		Franc-Waret	Rue du Village, 50	50.519831°N 4.975271°E	92138-CLT-0005-01 Info	
Fernelmont Castle ^{(fr)}		Noville-les-Bois		50.546710°N 4.987453°E	92138-CLT-0008-01 Info	
Facades and roofs of the sheds, secondary dwelling and outbuildings in the southern wing form with two corner pavilions, the western entrance, the porch by the pond and the rear wall in the West and the ensemble formed by the said buildings and structures, the castle (specified by Royal Decree of 29 May 1934) and the surrounding land. ^{(fr)}		Fernelmont		50.546820°N 4.986700°E	92138-CLT-0010-01 Info	
Chapel of Our Lady of the Seven Sorrows ^{(fr)}		Marchovelette	Rue du Parc, 25	50.525012°N 4.939937°E	92138-CLT-0011-01 Info	

== See also ==
- List of protected heritage sites in Namur (province)
- Fernelmont
