= Rhâââ Lovely Festival =

Belgian indie post-rock music festival

Coordinates: 50°34′N 4°56′E

The Rhâââ Lovely Festival was a Belgian indie post-rock festival that took place each April at Cortil-Wodon, a village near Namur, in rural Wallonia. A non-profit organisation, composed of volunteers, organised and promoted the event. The 9th annual Rhâââ Lovely Festival took place on 29 March 2008. A subsequent announcement on the official website stated that there would be no further edition of the festival.

The primary aim of the festival was to gather a quality lineup and offer cheap admission, so that the experience was as accessible as possible. Several notable bands, such as Piano Magic, 31knots, Deerhoof, Hood, Matt Elliott, The Durutti Column, The Shipping News, Migala, Tarentel, Hangedup, Explosions in the Sky, Tristeza, played in front of the festival's eight-hundred strong crowds, hosted by a local primary school.

As well as the music, there were other attractions. Short movies are shown, local photography is exhibited, and there are French poetry readings. In addition, the organisers produce a CD, which features one song from each band in concert.

The promoters intended that the festival stay entirely independent, economically and ideologically: they rejected corporate sponsoring, and refused to collaborate with Live Nation (ex-Clear Channel Entertainment). They also only served fairtrade food and drink during the festival's duration.

== Lineups ==
=== 2008 ===
Cupp Cave (B), Graffen Völder (B), Rockettothesky (NOR), El Dinah (B), Rien (F), The Stinky Squirrels (B), Mutiny On The Bounty (LUX), The CJ Boyd Sexxxtet (US), Sleeping People (US), This Will Destroy You (US), Enablers (US), Dead Meadow (US), Magyar Posse (FIN) and Youthmovies (UK)

=== 2007 ===
A Whisper in the Noise, Arnaud Michniak, Audrey, Bracken, Crippled Black Phoenix, Frank Shinobi, K-Branding, The Matt Elliott Foundation, Milena Song, Part Chimp, Pelican, Pentark, Rothko and yndi halda

=== 2006 ===
31knots, 65daysofstatic, Absinthe (Provisoire), Charlottefield, Deerhoof, Grails, I Love Sarah, Piano Magic, Picastro, Stinky Squirrels, This is Your Captain Speaking and VO.

=== 2005 ===
Amnesia, Tomàn, Red Sparowes, Milgram, Dreamend, The Durutti Column, Hood, K-Branding, Loobke, Half Asleep, Millimetrik, Squares on Both Sides, Manyfingers, Stafrænn Håkon and Matt Elliott.

=== 2004 ===
Raymondo, Some Tweetlove, Arca, Souvaris, Berg Sans Nipple, Explosions in the Sky, Migala, The Shipping News, T.I.F. and a Carte Postale Records stage.

=== 2003 ===
A December Lake, Sweek, Toboggan, Vandal X, Manta Ray, Peach Pit, Below The Sea, Tarentel and Hangedup.

=== 2002 ===
San Remo, Tom Sweetlove, Tiger Fernandez, Cheval De Frise, Starfield Season, Zythum, The Redneck Manifesto and Tristeza.

=== 2001 ===
Laila Kwyne, Lecitone, Quiet, Sweek, Electro:lux, Patton and My Own.

=== 2000 ===
I Love Plane, De.portables, Calc and JF Muck.
