= Draíocht =

Studio album by Dave Flynn
- Released: 2006
- Recorded: Mobile Studio Donegal, Dublin
- Genres: Folk, Celtic, Singer-Songwriter, World
- Length: 52:58
- Label: Frisbee Records
- Producer: Dave Flynn

Dave Flynn chronology
Draíocht (2006)	Contemporary Traditional Irish Guitar (2009)

Draíocht is the debut album by Irish composer, musician and songwriter Dave Flynn. It was released in 2006 through Frisbee Records and distributed through CDBaby.

== Content ==
The album is a mix of songs and instrumentals, strongly inspired by traditional Irish music. It includes five songs co-written with the poet Pádraic Ó Beirn.

The album was produced by Flynn with the assistance of sound engineers Manus Lunny and Paul Thomas.

== Track listing ==
1. "The Tempest in Mali" (Trad arr. Coleman/Dunne/Flynn/Swift)- 6:13
2. "The Mad Magician" (Flynn/Ó Beirn) - 4:00
3. "The Mad Magician's Daughter" (Flynn) - 1:23
4. "Stone Walls" (Flynn/Ó Beirn) - 6:28
5. "The Magical Reel/Cinderella's Slipper" (Flynn) - 4:30
6. "Beautiful Freaks Like Us" (Flynn/Ó Beirn)- 2:58
7. "The Afro-Classical Jig" (Flynn)- 1:39
8. "Ducks" (Flynn) - 4:51
9. "The Monument/The Crickets March over the Saltbox" (The Monument comp. Seán Nugent, The Crickets March over the Saltbox trad arr. Flynn/Swift)- 2.57
10. "Woodlands" (Flynn/Ó Beirn) - 3:39
11. "Inisheer/Louis' Waltz" (Inisheer comp. Thomas Walsh, Louis' Waltz trad arr. Dunne/Flynn) - 5:13
12. "Lullaby" (Flynn/Ó Beirn)- 4:43
13. "Drowsy Maggie/The Coming of Spring" (Drowsy Maggie trad arr. Flynn/Swift, The Coming of Spring comp. Paddy O'Brien- 4:29

== Personnel ==
- Dave Flynn - lead vocals, guitars, mandolin, octave mandolin, cimbalom, mbira
- Liz Coleman - fiddle
- Aidan Dunphy - drums, percussion
- Mick Dunne - banjo
- Manus Lunny - bodhrán
- Conan McDonnell - bodhrán
- Pádraic Ó Beirn - lyrics, backing vocals
- Brian O'Toole - bass guitar
- Ciarán Swift - guitar

== Reception ==
The album received a number of glowing reviews. John O'Regan in Irish Music Magazine wrote "Draíocht is one of the most surprising debuts to hit my ears in ages...An interesting and intriguing collection from a tunesmith, instrumentalist and composer, Dave Flynn is a name to conjure with and Draíocht is very definitely worth an open-minded listen."

Chris Nickson in Sing Out! wrote "Draiocht is Gaelic for magic, and it certainly suffuses this solo debut from Dublin Guitar Quartet member Flynn. He doesn’t hammer you over the head with his technique, but instead seduces with melody and invention, as on the opener, “The Tempest in Mall,” where subtle West African influences float under the music to create a lulling, gentle atmosphere. There’s very strong support from the other musicians, especially fiddler Liz Coleman and the pair of guitar duets with Ciaran Swift are little short of gorgeous. He closes with an interesting, slow version of Drowsy Maggie that brings out the delights of the tune to round out an album that is, yes, magic."
