= David Flynn (composer) =

Irish musician

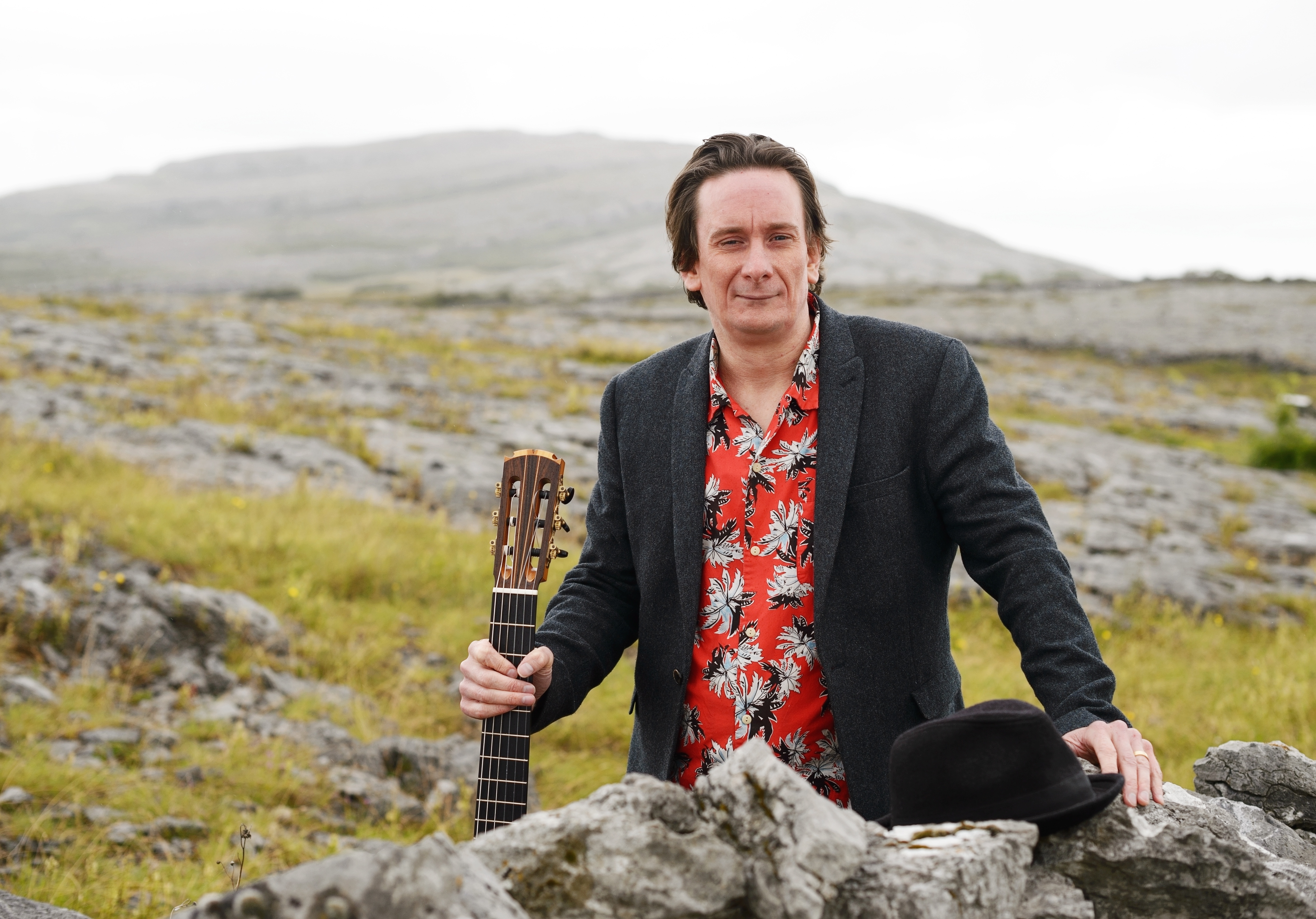
Composer and guitarist Dave Flynn

David Flynn (also known as Dave Flynn, born 6 January 1977) is an Irish composer, musician, and the founder and artistic director of the Irish Memory Orchestra. Many of his works music merge the influence of traditional Irish music with contemporary classical music and jazz. He is also a multi-instrumentalist who works across many genres including classical, jazz, rock and traditional Irish music, with guitar being his main instrument.

== Early experiences ==
Flynn was born and raised in Dublin, Ireland. His early musical experiences included brief periods studying piano and tin whistle, but it was not until his early teens that Flynn really took to music, teaching himself how to play rock guitar. He developed an interest in classical guitar in his mid-teens and taught himself how to read music notation, he also learnt classical guitar by ear from recordings. He composed his first piece for classical guitar aged 16.

Upon leaving school in 1995 he studied rock music at Ballyfermot College of Further Education, Dublin. Around this time Flynn started composing songs and performed on the Dublin singer-songwriter scene, including at Dave Murphy's "famous Tuesday night gigs" that helped then up-and-coming musicians like Glen Hansard, Damien Dempsey and Declan O'Rourke. He later developed a strong interest in traditional Irish music which he learnt through recordings and workshops at various Irish music festivals.

== Formal studies ==
In 1998 Flynn began formal classical music studies at the DIT Conservatory of Music and Drama, initially studying classical guitar on a part-time basis with John Feeley. In 1999 he enrolled in the full-time music degree course at the Conservatory, continuing his guitar studies with Feeley while majoring in composition. Now fully committed to composing, Flynn won the IMRO Composition Award in 2002 at the Feis Ceoil in Dublin for his string orchestra piece Mesh.

While at DIT he co-founded the Dublin Guitar Quartet with fellow students. He graduated in 2003 at which time he left the Dublin Guitar Quartet to move to London where he became the first person from the Republic of Ireland to be accepted onto the master's degree in Composition course at the Guildhall School of Music and Drama. At Guildhall he studied composition with Malcolm Singer and electro-acoustic music with Nye Parry and he formed his own ensemble, the David Flynn Collective. He graduated with a master's degree in composition from the Guildhall in 2004.

He returned to DIT in 2006 where he undertook a research PhD entitled Traditional Irish Music: A Path to New Music. He completed it in 2010.

== Professional composition career ==
=== 2000s ===
Flynn's professional composition career began in the early 2000s with performances of his music by artists including Jane O'Leary's Concorde ensemble, Rolf Hind and the Dublin Guitar Quartet. He also premiered many of his own guitar works at this time. His works from this period are often influenced by the minimalist music of John Adams, Philip Glass and Steve Reich and they have been published by Mel Bay.

Soon after graduating from the Guildhall School of Music and Drama in 2004, Flynn's string quartet piece Slip was selected for the Young Composers Workshop at the 2004 Huddersfield Contemporary Music Festival, which led to Flynn being awarded the 2004 Young Composers Award at the Festival. His prize was a commission to elaborate Slip into his String Quartet No. 2 "The Cranning" for the 2005 festival where it was premiered by the Smith Quartet to the acclaim of critics including Neil Fisher of The Times who praised Flynn for "incorporating traditional Irish music without Hollywood pastiche".

Music critic Michael Dervan of The Irish Times wrote: "Flynn is attempting to bring the influence of traditional Irish music into the hallowed realms of the classical string quartet and moments in the Smith Quartet's performance of this minimalist influenced work gelled to perfection."

Earlier in 2004 Flynn had instigated the foundation of the Young Composers Collective (YCC) in Ireland. Flynn announced the YCC with an article in the Journal of Music in Ireland (JMI) in which he criticised established bodies for failing to support young composers. The article caused some debate but ultimately led to the YCC providing a platform for a large number of previously unknown young composers to have their music performed. The YCC has since evolved into the Irish Composers' Collective. Flynn is no longer a member according to the ICC website.

Flynn caused further debate in the JMI in 2005 when his article "Looking for the Irish Bartók" questioned the failure of established Irish classical composers to engage with traditional Irish music and musicians. Despite some harsh criticism of Flynn's ideas from some of the established Irish composers, his article resonated with traditional Irish musicians who had in the past largely been ignored or denigrated by the Irish classical music establishment.

This article directly led to Flynn's contact with the renowned traditional Irish fiddler Martin Hayes and his musical partner, guitarist Dennis Cahill. In 2006, the Masters of Tradition Festival in Cork commissioned Flynn to compose a piece for Hayes and Cahill to perform with the classical violinist Ioana Petcu-Colan. The resulting piece Music for the Departed was premiered at the Masters of Tradition Festival in August 2006. At its US Premiere in 2010 at the Irish American Arts Center in New York, it was described as "A magnificent new work for fiddle, violin and guitar" by the Irish Examiner (USA).

=== 2010s ===
Flynn later worked with Martin Hayes on a number of other projects. In 2010, Hayes premiered Aontacht, a concerto for Irish fiddle and orchestra with the RTÉ Concert Orchestra in Ireland's National Concert Hall. The concert also featured a new arrangement of Music for the Departed with a string orchestra added to the fiddle, violin and guitar trio of the original.

Aontacht was reviewed in the Journal of Music, with editor Toner Quinn writing that "The precision of Flynn's writing displayed years of studying the music of Hayes: his style, rhythm, technical ability and aesthetic. At the same time, the composer moved the fiddle-player into unfamiliar territory, compelling him to climb through shifting, plated orchestral accompaniment. Each time Hayes arrived at a plateau, Flynn had spun the map, but Hayes was undeterred, ascending and chasing even harder. It was thrilling, heady and explosive. Brophy danced on the podium. I moved to the edge of my seat."

Irish Times critic Michael Dervan wrote "Flynn’s new Aontacht, premiered by Hayes with the RTÉ Concert Orchestra under David Brophy on Wednesday, is no conventional concerto. There’s not really much in the way of dialogue or give and take. It’s a vehicle for a traditional musician, with the orchestra cast in the role of a backing group, a sometimes assertive and noisy backing group, but a backing group nonetheless. And the soloist is worked pretty hard, with hardly a pause for breath. The solo part is unconventional, too – all notated with precision, but not intended to be played as written. It’s more on the lines of a template, which the fiddler can adapt to his own preferred inflections or spur-of-the-moment inspiration. Hayes is one of those players who projects a great sense of long-term purpose. His energy feels as if it’s focused on a point that’s well ahead of wherever he’s actually at. You don’t just want to hear him in the now, you want to stay with him to experience the future he’s so clearly promising. He sustained that unflagging sense of focus through the strange tilt and lilt of Flynn’s melodic writing. And it was in the work’s most unrelentingly busy movement, the finale which the composer describes as an "epic reel which climbs gradually from the depths of anger to the heights of ecstasy", that performer and work seemed most effectively aligned."

Flynn continued to work with traditional Irish musicians in the creation of new concert works. Other such works included The Forest of Ornaments for flautist Harry Bradley, Five Études for Uilleann Pipes for uilleann piper Mick O'Brien and The Valley of the Lunatics for fiddle player Caoimhín Ó Raghallaigh. These works and others were premiered at the 2011 Masters of Tradition Festival in Cork at a concert devoted entirely to Flynn's music.

In 2014, the Crash Ensemble premiered Flynn's composition "Joy" with Flynn and Niwel Tsumbu as electric guitar soloists. The Premiere was conducted by Alan Pierson at Cork Opera House.

This was followed by the premiere of his first opera "Mná Brian Boru", commissioned by Clare County Council to mark the 1000th anniversary of the death of Brian Boru. This opera called for vocalists to sing in the Irish traditional sean nós style rather than a classical singing style. The bi-lingual libretto was written in English and Irish translations and was premiered in St. Flannan's Cathedral, Killaloe in 2014.

Also in 2014, Flynn released a solo electric guitar album "Winter Variations" on his label Frisbee Records.

2016 saw the premiere of "Calmly Awaiting the End" a work for uilleann pipes and string quartet which Flynn composed after he won the Éamonn Ceannt Commission Competition. It premiered in Galway's Town Hall Theatre during the Galway Sessions Festival. The work was selected by RTÉ to represent Ireland at the 2017 International Rostrum of Composers.

In 2019 Flynn was appointed the first ever Composer-in-Residence at Farmleigh, Ireland's state guest house. For his residency Flynn composed two new works "Harp-Lute" for harp duo and 'The Farmleigh Tree Alphabet', for SATB choir was set to the poetry of Theo Dorgan. These works were premiered at the Farmleigh Music and Arts Festival, which Flynn devised for his residency. Dorgan was one of several artists to accept Flynn's invitation to participate in the festival, including Stephen Rea, Paddy Glackin, Laura Snowden and Mick O'Brien.

=== Irish Memory Orchestra ===
In 2012 Flynn founded the Clare Memory Orchestra, a cross-genre orchestra mixing musicians trained in classical music, traditional Irish music, jazz and other styles. Renamed the Irish Memory Orchestra in 2016, the orchestra performs Flynn's compositions and arrangements entirely by memory.

In 2013 an hour-long cross-genre orchestral work, 'The Clare Concerto', was composed by Flynn and premiered by a 70-piece Clare Memory Orchestra in the Glór Theatre, Ennis. This project earned Flynn a 2014 Allianz Business to Arts Award nomination alongside the orchestra and project funders Clare County Council.

The Irish Memory Orchestra often features several established Irish musicians as guests including accordionist Máirtín O'Connor and Liz Carroll who performed as guest soloist for the orchestra's debut concert in Glór Theatre in Ennis on 21 September 2012. The string section of the orchestra is made up of musicians who are trained in both Irish fiddle techniques as they are in classical string techniques. The wind section mixes uilleann pipes, wooden flute (a.k.a. Irish Flute), tin whistle and oboe. The 'Harmony/Rhythm Section' features Irish Harp, Guitar, Double Bass and Percussion including the native Irish drum, the bodhrán. The horn section features ancient Irish horns alongside trumpet, trombone and saxophone. Niamh Varian-Barry, former lead singer of Irish-American group Solas, is orchestra leader

Other members of the orchestra include Anne-Maire O'Farrell, Eimear McGeown, Aisling Agnew, Neil Yates and Niwel Tsumbu.

In 2017, Flynn completed his first symphony, "The Memory Symphony". The symphony is unique in the orchestral repertoire by way of the fact that it was composed specifically to be performed without sheet-music and performances can include any musical instrument. It was premiered by the orchestra and special guest Mairtin O'Connor in Dublin's Christchurch Cathedral in November 2017.

He has followed this up with two more symphonies completed in 2019. "The Clare Symphony" and "The Vision Symphony". The "Vision Symphony" was composed as part of a project to enable blind and vision-impaired musicians to perform with orchestras. The premiere, in October 2019, featuring the Irish Memory Orchestra joined by several blind and vision-impaired musicians, and was praised as "boundary breaking in a new way" in the Journal of Music. The project was funded by the Arts Council of Ireland and Clare County Council.

Based in County Clare on the west coast of Ireland, the orchestra has performed at the Jeonju Sori International Festival of Traditional Music in Korea, Moscow Christmas Festival and at the National Concert Hall, Dublin in collaboration with Martin Hayes, Dennis Cahill and the RTÉ Concert Orchestra.

=== Later works and publications ===
Outside of his collaborations with traditional musicians, Flynn's music is performed by classical musicians and ensembles around the world including the Prague Chamber Orchestra, New Juilliard Ensemble, Contempo Quartet, Dublin Guitar Quartet, and guitarist John Feeley.

Violinist Irina Muresanu released the first recording of Flynn's solo violin work "Tar Éis an Caoineadh" on her 2018 album "Four Strings Around the World" on Sono Luminus and she regularly performs it in her concerts. The recording and her performances of the work have been acclaimed in the Boston Globe, Limelight and many other publications.

Flynn has had radio specials dedicated to his music on WNYC New York's New Sounds show hosted by John Schaefer and RTÉ lyric fm's 'Cross Currents' series on Irish composers.

His primary publisher is his own company Frisbee Publications, however Four Études for Five Fingers and Complete Guitar Works have been published by Mel Bay and Toccata for Obama is published by Reed Music.

== Traditional music career ==
Aside from his work as a composer and classical guitarist, Flynn is a regular performer of traditional Irish music. His debut recording 'Draíocht', a mix of traditional Irish music and new compositions and songs based on the tradition, was released late in 2006. Most of the songs on the album were co-written with the poet/lyricist Pádraic Ó'Beírn. The album was co-produced by Flynn with engineers Manus Lunny and Paul Thomas. Writing in Irish Music Magazine, critic John O'Regan says, "Draíocht is one of the most surprising debuts to hit my ears in ages ... An interesting and intriguing collection from a tunesmith, instrumentalist and composer, Dave Flynn is a name to conjure with and Draíocht is very definitely worth an open-minded listen."

Flynn's second album, Contemporary Traditional Irish Guitar, was released in 2009 on Frisbee Records. The album contains completely solo guitar versions of music by some a number of traditional Irish music composers from the 20th century, including a number of compositions by Paddy Fahey. There is also music by Ed Reavy, Liz Carroll. Charlie Lennon and Tommy Peoples. One of Flynn's own compositions, The Mahatma of the Glen, a tribute to the late fiddle player James Byrne, also features. The album received critical acclaim in folk and classical publications including Irish Music Magazine and Classical Guitar Magazine.

As a traditional guitar accompanist, Flynn has played with Irish traditional musicians such as Martin Hayes, Paddy Glackin, Liz Carroll, Máirtín O'Connor, Charlie Lennon and Tommy Peoples.

== Personal life ==
Flynn is a dual resident of Ireland and New Zealand. He divides his time between these countries with his wife Celia.

== Awards ==
- 2002 – IMRO Composition Award, Feis Ceoil, Dublin
- 2004 – Huddersfield Contemporary Music Festival Composers' Award – For the String Quartet Work 'The Cranning'
- 2015 – Allianz Business to Arts Award with the Irish Memory Orchestra and ESB
- 2016 – Eamon Ceannt Memorial Commission Competition Winner
- 2019 – Galway Music Residency Commission Winner

== Recordings ==
Flynn's recordings include:

- Draíocht (2006)
- Contemporary Traditional Irish Guitar (2009)
- Winter Variations – New Music for Electric Guitar (2014)
- D.F.F. – Pouric Songs (2014)
- Shadowplay – New Irish Music for Flute and Guitar (2016)
- Genre Jumping – The Best of Dave Flynn Vol. 1 – Chamber Music (2017)
- Genre Jumping – The Best of Dave Flynn Vol. 2 – Celtic Strings (2017)
- Genre Jumping – The Best of Dave Flynn Vol. 3 – Indie Pop (2017)
- Stories from the Old World – Music for Strings, Pipes and Voices (2018)
- Dun Laoghaire Guitars (2020)

== Complete concert works ==
- "Elegy For Joan" for guitar solo (1993)
- "Homage To Villa-Lobos" for guitar solo (1998)
- "Irish Seascape with Waves-Homage to Leo Brouwer" for guitar solo (2000)
- "5to9" for guitar solo (2000)
- "Passacaglia" for guitar solo (2000)
- "Rainstorm" for guitar solo (2000)
- "Chimurenga" for Guitar Quartet (2000)
- "3 Gymno'Paddy's" for guitar solo (2000/2001)
- "Twelve-Tone BACH" for piano solo (2001)
- "Mesh" for String Orchestra (2001)
- "Quirk No.1" Versions available for Violin & Cello or Flute & B♭ Clarinet (2001)
- "Quirk No.2 (Shadowplay)" for Flute and Guitar (2002)
- "Kora" for Guitar Quartet (2002)
- "Horrific Spasm" for Chamber Quintet (2002)
- "I have always known" Song set to poem by Narihiri for voice and piano (2002)
- "7–11" for Piano 4-Hands or Piano Duet (2002/2003)
- "After Cowell" for Solo Piano (2003)
- "Echoes of Bamako" for String Orchestra (2003)
- "Polymetric Cycles" – for Chamber Ensemble (2003)
- String Quartet No.1 "Fairground Attractions" (2003)
- "Quirk No.3" for Alto Flute, Oboe, E♭ Clarinet, Soprano Sax & Guitar (2003)
- "Full Circle" song cycle for voice and piano set to poetry by Joan Jennings (2003/2004)
- "Two Nonsense Songs" for voice and piano (2003–04)
- "Manipulations" for Chamber Sextet (2004)
- "Electric Guichair" electronic music (2004)
- "Between the Jigs and the Reels" for Violin & Piano.(2004)
- "String Quartet No.2 The Cranning" (2004/5)
- "Four Etudes for Five Finger Right Hand Technique" guitar solo (2005)
- "Tar éis an Cran" for Fiddle and keyboard (piano or harpsichord) (2005)
- "Ómós do Frankie Kennedy" for Flute and Guitar (2006)
- "Music for the Departed" for Fiddle, Violin and Guitar (2006)
- "Errigal Suite" for traditional Irish musician and two Guitars (2007)
- "Taibhreamh O Ríada" for traditional Irish music ensemble and seán nós singers (2007)
- "String Quartet No.3 The Keening" (2007)
- "Tar Eís an Caoineadh" for solo violin (2008)
- 'Aontacht' Concerto for Traditional Irish Musician and Orchestra (2008)
- "Scealta an Seansaol/Stories from the Old World" for Uilleann pipes, String Quartet and Narrator/Singer (2008)
- "Toccata for Obama" for violin and guitar (2009)
- "The Mahatma of the Glen" for solo guitar (2009)
- "Five Études for Uilleann Pipes" (2009)
- "The Longest Reel" (2009) for solo fiddle
- "The Forest of Ornaments" (2010) for improvising soloist playing Irish flutes, fifes, shakuhachi, fujara with a pre-recorded sound collage
- "The Valley of the Lunatics" (2010) for detuned 'Bb' fiddle, retuned hardanger fiddle and pre-recorded sound collage
- "Le Chéile is in Aonar" (2010) for traditional Irish music ensemble – 2 fiddles, 2 flutes, 3 tin whistles and uilleann pipes
- "Hyper-Reel" (2010) for solo percussion (Marimba and woodblock)
- "The Man from Maghera Rambles through Africa" (2010) for orchestra
- "Protest Songs" (2011) for SATB choir
- "Quirk No7 – Slides, Cuts, Rolls and Crans" (2011) for flute and clarinet/bass clarinet
- "An Irish Raga" (2011) for solo guitar
- "Sebene" (2011) for guitar quartet
- "The Clare Concerto" (2013) for large memory orchestra
- "Joy" (2013–2014) for amplified ensemble
- "Mná Brian Boru" (2014) 'Sean nós' Opera in 4 Acts
- "Winter Variations" (2014) for solo electric guitar
- "Calmly Awaiting the End" (2016) for uilleann pipes and string quartet
- "Irreligiosity" (2016) for SATB choir
- "Symphony No.1 – The Memory Symphony" (2017) for large memory orchestra
- "Stone Walls" (2018) for voices and chamber orchestra
- "The Mad Magician" (2018) for voices and chamber orchestra
- "Symphony No.2 – The Clare Symphony" (2013/2019) for orchestra
- "Symphony No.3 – The Vision Symphony" (2019) for memory orchestra and blind/vision-impaired musicians
- "The Farmleigh Tree Alphabet" (2019) for SATB Choir
- "Harp-Lute" (2019) for two harps

== Bibliography ==
- Dervan, Michael "Experiments with Sound", The Irish Times, 30 November 2005
- Fisher, Neil "Concert:Huddersfield Festival", The Times, 30 November 2005
- Flynn, David "The Young Composers Collective" in The Journal of Music in Ireland (Vol.4 No.3)
- Flynn, David "Looking for the Irish Bartók" in The Journal of Music in Ireland (Vol.5 No.4)
- Also refer to The Journal of Music in Ireland Vol.5 No.5 and Vol.5 No.6 for debate on this article
- Long, Siobhán "Losing their Shackles to Play from the Heart", The Irish Times, 14 August 2006
- O'Regan, John "Dave Flynn – Draíocht album review", Irish Music Magazine, December 2007
- Scores and Programme Notes for David Flynn's compositions can be found in The Contemporary Music Centre, Dublin
