= Isabelle Brunelle =

German philanthropist (1724–1805)

Isabelle Brunelle, Countess d'Harscamp
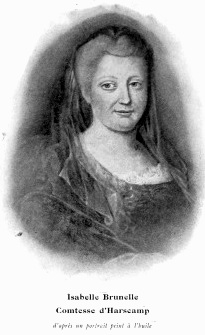
- Born: 3 September 1724; Aachen, Holy Roman Empire
- Died: 8 May 1805 (aged 80); Namur, Belgium
- Occupation: Philanthropist
- Known for: Philanthropic work; founder of Hospice d'Harscamp
- Notable work: Hospice d'Harscamp

Isabelle Brunelle (3 September 1724 — 8 May 1805), Countess d'Harscamp, was a German refugee and philanthropist.

== Life ==
Brunelle was born in Aachen on 3 September 1724, the daughter of Herman Brunelle and Jeanne-Marie Tilmans. She was educated in Liège, Belgium, and in 1748 married François-Pontian d'Harscamp, a member of the noble house d'Harscamp, who had extensive interests in arms manufacturing. Their early married life was spent in Hungary, where they had considerable property. Three children were born to them there, all of whom died young. After 1765, the couple moved to Namur, in the Austrian Netherlands, where they became part of Belgian high society. Pontian d'Harscamp died at Fernelmont in May 1794 and was buried in Noville-les-Bois. Isabelle inherited his fortune but left the Low Countries due to the French invasion, finding refuge first in Bavaria and later in Prussia. She briefly returned to the Low Countries in 1797, before again becoming a refugee in Germany and then Poland.

Finally returning to the Low Countries again, on 24 November 1800 she took an oath of loyalty to the Constitution of the French Republic in Liège. She died in Namur on 8 May 1805 and was buried beside her husband in Noville-les-Bois.

== Foundations ==
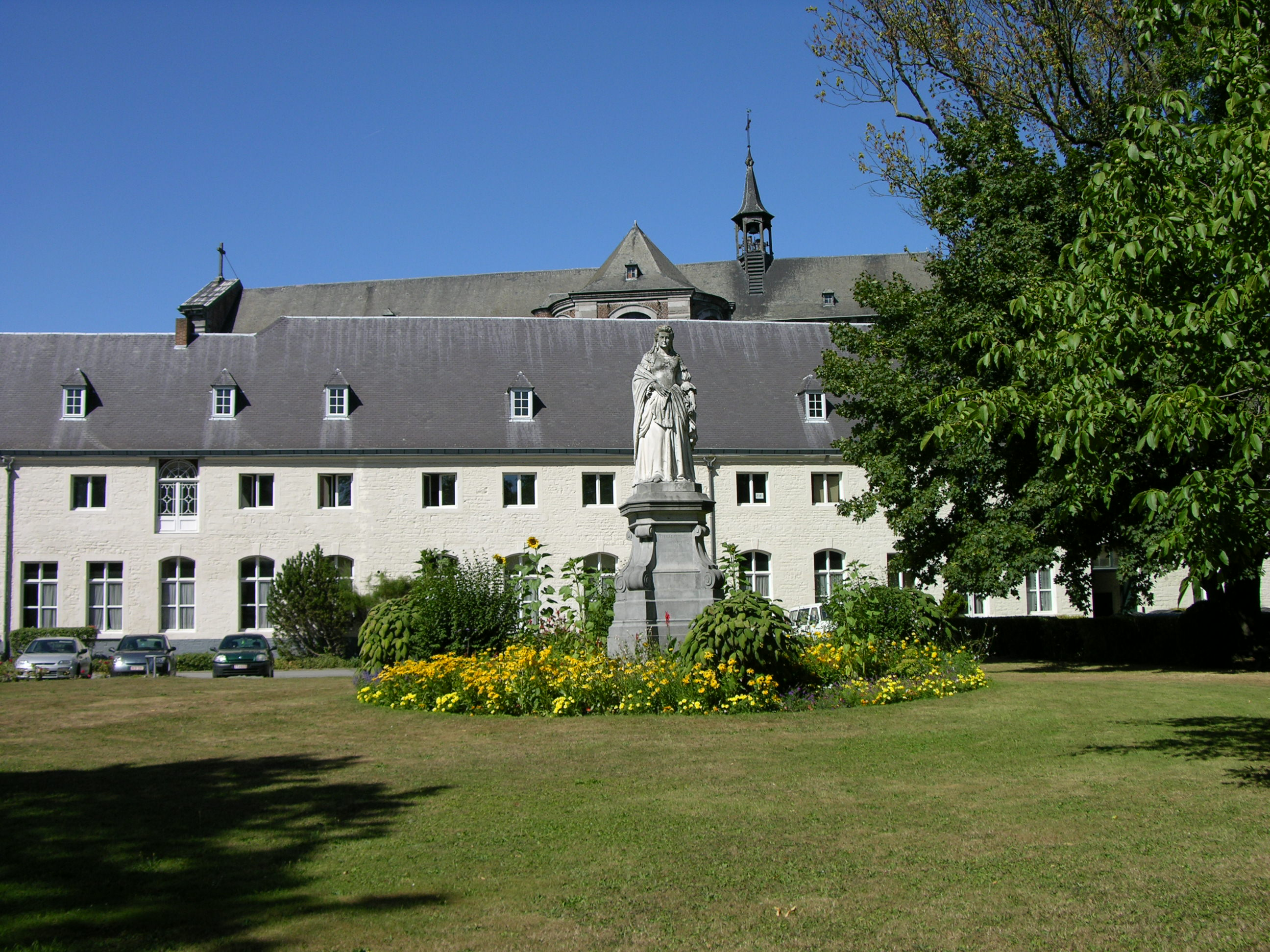
Hospice d'Harscamp

By her will, first drawn up in Fernelmont on 28 April 1788, and modified in 1784 and 1805, Brunelle established four foundations for the poor in Aachen and an almshouse in Namur. The almshouse, named Hospice d'Harscamp, was opened in 1812 in the buildings of the former Recollect convent. On 15 May 1872, a stone statue of Brunelle, sculpted by Guillaume Geefs, was unveiled in the almshouse garden. In Aachen, a street was named Harscampstrasse in her memory.
