= Dublin Guitar Quartet =

Irish classical music performing group

The Dublin Guitar Quartet
- Origin: Dublin
- Genres: Contemporary classical, chamber music
- Years active: 2001–present
- Label: Orange Mountain Music
- Members: Brian Bolger; Pat Brunnock; Tomas O'Durcain; Chien Buggle
- Past members: David Creevy; Cian O'Hara; Andrew Olwil; Michael O'Toole; David Flynn
- Website: dublinguitarquartet.com

The Dublin Guitar Quartet is an Irish guitar quartet that specialises in the performance of contemporary classical music, particularly music associated with minimalist composers such as Philip Glass, Steve Reich, Arvo Pärt and Kevin Volans. The bulk of their repertoire consists of their own transcriptions of works by these composers. They have also transcribed and performed works by György Ligeti, Igor Stravinsky and Michael Nyman.

== History ==
The group formed in 2001 while founder members Brian Bolger, Patrick Brunnock, David Flynn and Redmond O'Toole were all studying at the Dublin Conservatory of Music and Drama. This line-up avoided standard classical guitar repertoire in favour of their own arrangements of important international composers. Their first batch of arrangements included David Flynn's arrangements of String Quartet No.2 Company and String Quartet No.3 Mishima by Philip Glass and Summa by Arvo Pärt and Brian Bolger's arrangements of String Quartet No.1 White Man Sleeps by Kevin Volans and Soundscapes over Landscapes by The Redneck Manifesto. The quartet's first performance was as support to the Redneck Manifesto in Whelan's of Wexford Street in Dublin on 26 January 2002.

== Transcriptions ==
Philip Glass

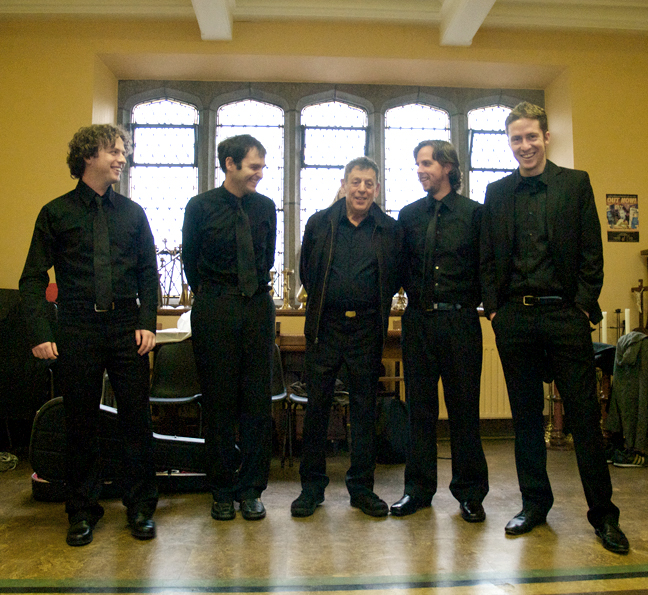
Dublin Guitar Quartet backstage with Philip Glass

The Dublin Guitar Quartet have transcribed, performed and recorded string quartets No.2 to No.5 by the celebrated American composer Philip Glass. B In January 2011 the quartet recorded a performance film which was directed by Gareth Averill and Piers McGrail. This film included a performance of String Quartet No. 3 Mishima. In May 2014 the quartet released an album of these arrangements on the composer's own label Orange Mountain Music.

In 2008 the quartet performed with Philip Glass in Louth Contemporary Music Society concert. This included a solo performance by Philip Glass of his Etudes. The concert took place on 17 July 2008 at 8pm in St. Patrick's, Dundalk. The Dublin Guitar Quartet performed arrangements of Glass's string quartets Mishima (movements III, IV, V) and Company. They were given an introduction by the composer:

“This is a very special arrangement. Arranging for guitars is a very tricky business and you really have to know what you are doing, so i have never done it, but Dave Flynn and Brian Bolger [Dublin Guitar Quartet] have made these arrangements and they're really quite beautiful.”

Arvo Pärt

Summa is an original composition for choir by Estonian composer Arvo Pärt. The DGQ transcription was released by the composer's publisher Universal Edition. The quartet received input on from the composer while making a recording for Irish contemporary music presenter Louth Contemporary Music Society (LCMS). Summa is included in the quartet's 2011 performance film.

Kevin Volans

An early transcription produced the DGQ is White Man Sleeps by Kevin Volans. This work was originally written for harpsichord and viola da gamba but was transcribed by the composer on request from the Kronos Quartet. The DGQ transcription of the string quartet version suggests a timbral hybrid of the original composition and string quartet transcription. This is a result of the mechanical and timbral similarities between the harpsichord and guitar. The DGQ recorded the work for the debut album Deleted Pieces.

"'I normally hate arrangements of my work,' he says. 'And they came along saying they'd already done it. I groaned. And then they came to play it for me. It was terrific. Somebody had already arranged it at one point for three guitars, and Chester's [ Volans's publisher] more or less turned it down. But the new one was really good, so Chester's, at my insistence, okayed it.'"

György Ligeti

The quartet have made a transcription of the Six Bagatelles by Hungarian composer György Ligeti. The quartet were given permission to make this transcription by the composer's widow and publisher Schott Music. When producing the original Six Bagatelles for wind quintet, Ligeti selected six movements from his solo piano work Musica ricercata on request by the Jeney Quartet. The Dublin Guitar Quartet produced their first transcription on hearing the Fabian Oehrli's transcription of the Six Bagatelles for Saxophone Quartet. The Dublin Guitar Quartet have also performed their transcription of the original source piece Musica Ricercata.

The Redneck Manifesto

The Redneck Manifesto are a post-rock band from Dublin, Ireland. Dublin Guitar Quartet member Brian Bolger is the brother of band member Matthew Bolger. Brian Bolger made a transcription of Soundscapes Over Landscapes by the group. The original recording can by found on the Redneck Manifesto's first album Thirty Six Strings. The quartet arrangement is included on the Dublin Guitar Quartet's first album Deleted Pieces.

Others

On 1 May 2010 the Dublin Guitar Quartet performed Repentance by Russian composer Sofia Gubaidulina. The piece included a solo cello part performed by Russian cellist Ivan Monighetti and a double bass part performed by Malachy Robinson. The concert was presented by LCMS at St. Peter's Church in Drogheda.

On 1 August 2010 the Dublin Guitar Quartet performed new works by the spatial music Collective at Smock Alley Theatre in Dublin's City Centre. They performed as an electric guitar quartet with guitar amplifiers positioned in the four corners of the venue. The concert included new works by Linda Buckley, Simon Cullen, Michael Flemming and Jonathan Nangle.

== Discography ==
- The Dublin Guitar Quartet Performs Philip Glass (2014)
- Deleted Pieces (2005)
- Contemporary Irish (2018)
