= Eimear McGeown =

Irish classical flautist (born 1983)

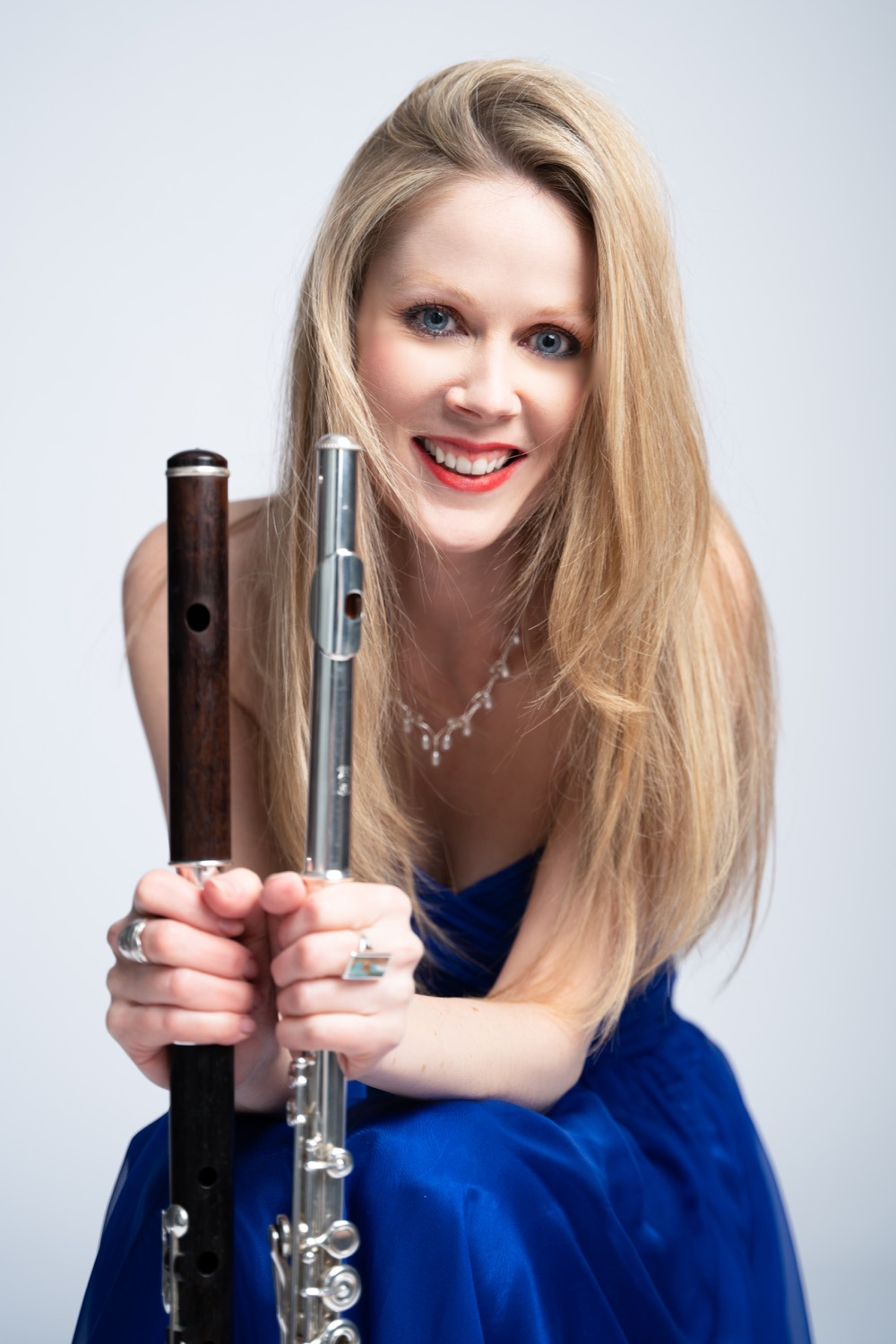

Background information
- Born: 1983 (age 42–43); County Armagh
- Genres: Traditional Irish, classical, Celtic
- Occupation: Flautist
- Instrument: Flute
- Website: www.eimearmcgeown.com

Eimear McGeown (born 1983) is a flautist. She utilises the styles of Irish traditional, Celtic, classical, pop/rock and creative cinematic arrangements as a versatile utility of the Irish flute and classical flute.

== Early life and education ==
McGeown was born in County Armagh in Northern Ireland, United Kingdom on the 18th March 1983. She graduated from Trinity College of Music London in 2005 with a 1st class degree Batchelor Music (with Honors). She studied the traditional Irish flute under Seamus Tansey.

== Career ==
McGeown has recorded on PBS TV channel in the United States of America for pianist Tim Janis and performed with him at Carnegie Hall where she first made her debut. Her debut album Inis was released in June 2018 and was launched at the Embassy of Ireland, London. Her television debut was a solo performance for 'The View' on RTÉ. She has recorded with pianist Barry Douglas on two of his Celtic Albums released on Chandos Records. Both albums feature several of her own compositions which she performed with Camerata Ireland orchestra in The Kennedy Center, Washington and in Carnegie Hall, NY.

McGeown has performed as a soloist in the United States of America, The Philippines, South America, South Korea, Japan, China, Russia and Europe. This includes the 'Dave Morris’ Concerto performed in the Library of Congress Washington, D.C. as well as the BBC's Last Night of The Proms McGeown published a rendition of "May It Be", a song co-composed and sung by Enya for the 2001 Peter Jackson movie The Lord of the Rings: The Fellowship of the Ring, where McGeown played a keyless Martin Doyle C flute made of African Blackwood and is accompanied by Jonny Toman on guitar.

Eimear's professional engagements have led her to record at the Abbey Road Studios and contribute to the soundtrack of RuneScape. Her theatrical experience includes a performance in Lord of the Rings in London's West End. As a soloist, she has performed at the World SciFi Convention Concert, where she presented compositions from her album accompanied by the Worldcon Philharmonic Orchestra. Additionally, she has collaborated with the Surge Orchestra.

Eimear has performed at the Sori International Music Festival in South Korea, collaborating with the Irish Memory Orchestra. Additionally, she was a featured soloist with the international choral group, 'Libera', at Tokyo’s Opera City Concert Hall. She has supported Ed Sheeran and performed with Jennifer Hudson on the final of the TV show 'The Voice' and on the National Television Awards. She performed with the rock band 'Amsterdam' at the Glastonbury Festival and supported The Pogues at the Echo Arena in Liverpool.

== Awards and honours ==
- McGeown was awarded the TCM Silver medal in 2006 from Trinity College of Music, London.
- McGeown won the Clandeboye Musician of the Year in 2006.
- The President of Ireland Mary McAleese 2006, presented the Craigavon flautist Eimear McGeown with the Camerata/Accenture - Young Musician of the Year Award during the performance with Barry Douglas.
- McGeown is the recipient of the 'First Prize' for ‘Best Performer’ at the International Sir James Galway Flute Festival and the TCM Silver Medal Award.
- McGeown received an invitation by Her Majesty the Queen Elizabeth II and The Duke of Edinburgh to attend the Royal Reception at Buckingham Palace, London, United Kingdom in May 2011 in recognition of her contributions in the Performing Arts.
- She was the 'All Ireland Flute Champion' winning the title twice.

== Recordings ==
Year	Title	Role
2021	Irlandiani (Carina Drury)	Flute
2020	Speak Up (Sion Hill)	Flute
2019	Fear A Bhata (Live) (Peacock Angell)	Flute
2018	Inis	Irish and Classical Flute
2018	Hushabye (Hayley Westenra)	Flute
2018	Sacred (Fjellheim)	Flute
2016	Celtic Airs	Irish Flute
2016	The Mushroom Tree (Barry Douglas)	Flute
2016	Ballyvaughan Pier / The Runescape Jig / Secret Circle Reel (Barry Douglas)	Flute
2016	Brendan's Air (Barry Douglas)	Flute
2015	Cantus (Fjellheim)	Flute
2014	Celtic Reflections	Flute
