= Arde (album) =

Studio album by Migala
- Released: June 10, 2001
- Recorded: Collado Villalba; Rock Soul Studio, Madrid
- Labels: Sub Pop; Acuarela Discos

Migala chronology
Así duele un verano (1998)	Arde (2001)	Restos de un incendio (2001)

Arde is the third album by Spanish band Migala. It was released on Sub Pop and Acuarela Discos on June 10, 2001.

== Critical reception ==
Professional ratings
Aggregate scores
Source	Rating
Metacritic	77/100
Review scores
Source	Rating
AllMusic	4/5 stars
Chronic'art	4/5
Lafonoteca	4.5/5
Pitchfork	9.3/10

The album was met with positive reviews from critics. At Metacritic, which assigns a weighted average rating out of 100 to reviews from mainstream publications, this release received an average score of 77, based on six reviews, which indicates "generally favorable reviews".

== Track listing ==
No.	Title	Length
1.	"Primera Parada"	2:28
2.	"El Coballo del Malo"	4:32
3.	"Fortune's Show of Our Last"	4:12
4.	"Ourt Times of Disaster"	3:56
5.	"Primer Tren de la Mañana"	2:02
6.	"La Noche"	2:37
7.	"La Espera"	3:17
8.	"Suburbian Empty Movie Theatre"	2:57
9.	"Principios de Agosto"	1:43
10.	"The Guilt"	4:04
11.	"Cuatro Estaciones"	2:34
12.	"High of Defenses"	2:55
13.	"Last Fool Around"	3:19
14.	"Arde"	6:38

== Personnel ==
- David Belmonte – keyboard arrangements, electric guitar arrangements
- Abel Hernández – vocals, acoustic guitar, electric guitar, keyboard, effects
- Rodrigo Hernández – bass, acoustic guitar, electric guitar, keyboard, percussion, melodica, choir, noise
- Migala – production
- Rubén Moreno – drums, percussion, violin
- Silvia Raposo – cello
- Irene Rodríguez Tremblay – vocals (3)
- Jordi Sancho – Rhodes piano, keyboard, bass
- Alberto Seara – recordings
- Carlos Torero – bongos (1), recording
- Nacho Vegas – guitar, effects
- Coque Yturriaga – keyboard, noise, electric guitar, backing vocals
- Diego Yturriaga – accordion, dulzaina, Casiotone, irons, choir
