= This Is Your Captain Speaking =

- Origin: Melbourne, Victoria, Australia
- Genres: Post-rock
- Years active: 2005–present
- Labels: Resonant
- Members: Nick Lane; David Evans; Steve Ward; Aaron "Dhanesh" Trimmer; Seth Rees
- Website: official site

This Is Your Captain Speaking are an Australian post-rock band based in Melbourne.

== History ==
This Is Your Captain Speaking released their debut album Storyboard independently in Australia in May 2005 and sold out of the first pressing. Storyboard received critical acclaim from around the world, with reviewers describing the album as "66 minutes of pure musical bliss." The album was recorded in the library of an elementary school.

The band was then signed to UK label Resonant Records, who re-issued the album in Europe in 2006. The band then toured Europe and the UK, including performing at Belgium's Rhaaa Lovely Festival, where they played alongside Deerhoof, 65daysofstatic, Piano Magic, Grails and 31knots.

In November 2008, the band released their second album, Eternal Return, which is released on the band's own label, with digital licensing through London-based Diogenes Music.

== Members ==
Current members

- Nick Lane – guitar, mandolin.
- David Evans – drum kit, metallophone, typewriter, glockenspiel.
- Steve Ward – guitar.
- Aaron Trimmer (Dhanesh) – guitar / bass.

Past members

- Aaron Trimmer – guitar.
- Seth Rees – guitar.
- Gavin Vance – bass.

== Discography ==
- Storyboard (2005, re-released 2006)
- Eternal Return (2008)
- Arc (2013)

== See also ==
- List of post-rock bands
