= Sweeck =

Sweeck is a surname. Notable people with the surname include:

- Alfons Sweeck (1936–2019), Belgian cyclist, grandfather of Diether and Laurens
- Diether Sweeck (born 1993), Belgian cyclist, brother of Laurens
- Laurens Sweeck (born 1993), Belgian cyclist

== See also ==
- Sweek
