= Fort de Marchovelette =

Belgian military fortification

- Part of Fortifications of Namur
- Marchovelette, Belgium
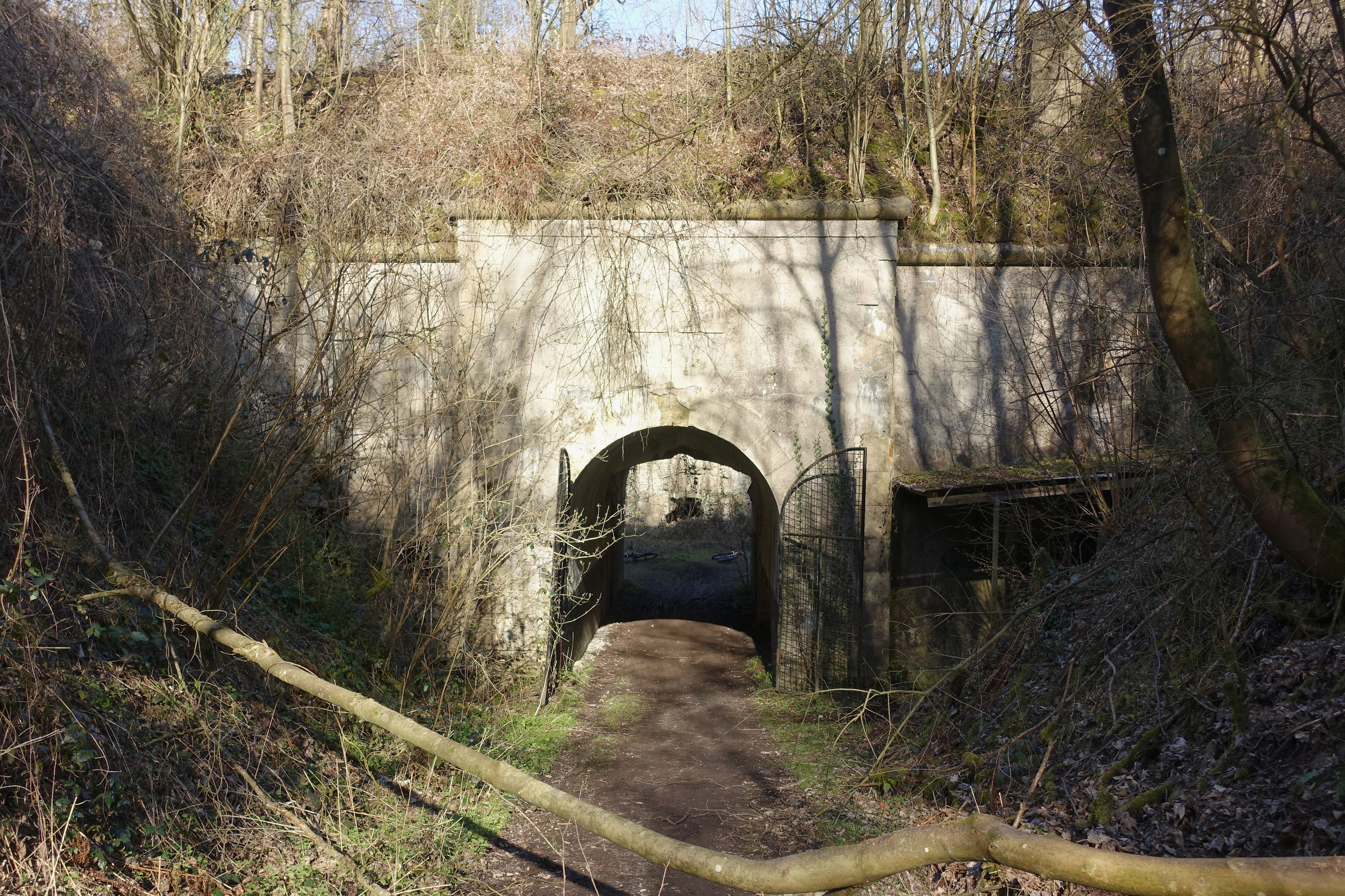

Site information
- Type: Fort
- Owner: State of Belgium
- Controlled by: Belgium
- Open to the public: No
- Condition: Abandoned, training facility

Location
- Coordinates: 50.50653°N 4.9374°E

Site history
- Built: 1888
- Materials: Unreinforced concrete
- Battles/wars: Siege of Namur, Battle of Belgium

The Fort de Marchovelette is one of nine forts built as part of the fortifications of Namur in the late 19th century in Belgium. It was built between 1888 and 1892 according to the plans of General Henri Alexis Brialmont. Contrasting with the French forts built in the same era by Raymond Adolphe Séré de Rivières, the fort was built exclusively of unreinforced concrete, a new material, rather than masonry. In 1914 the fort was heavily bombarded by German artillery in the Battle of Namur. Malonne was upgraded in the 1930s to become part of the fortified position of Namur in an attempt to forestall or slow an attack from Germany. It saw action in 1940 during the Battle of Belgium, and was captured by German forces. The fort is now used as a military and police training facility.

== Description ==
The Fort de Marchovelette is located about 6.8 kilometres (4.2 mi) northeast of the center of Namur at the intersection of three villages : Marchovelette, Champion and Bonnine. The fort forms a triangle in plan. A 6-metre (20 ft) deep by 8-metre (26 ft) ditch encircles the fort. The ditches were defended in enfilade by 57mm guns in casemates resembling counterscarp batteries, firing at shot traps at the other end of the ditch. The principal armament was concentrated in the central massif, closely grouped in a solid mass of concrete.

Belgian forts made little provision for the daily needs of their wartime garrisons, locating latrines, showers, kitchens and the morgue in the fort's counterscarp, a location that would be untenable in combat. This would have profound effects on the forts' ability to endure a long assault. The service areas were placed directly opposite the barracks, which opened into the ditch in the rear of the fort (i.e., in the face towards Namur), with lesser protection than the front and "salient" sides. The Brialmont forts placed a weaker side to the rear to allow for recapture by Belgian forces from the rear, and located the barracks and support facilities on this side, using the rear ditch for light and ventilation of living spaces. In combat heavy shellfire made the rear ditch untenable, and German forces were able to get between the forts and attack them from the rear. The Brialmont forts placed a weaker side to the rear to allow for recapture by Belgian forces from the rear, and located the barracks and support facilities on this side, using the rear ditch for light and ventilation of living spaces. In combat heavy shellfire made the rear ditch untenable, and German forces were able to get between the forts and attack them from the rear. The Brialmont forts were designed to be protected from shellfire equaling their heaviest guns: 21cm. The top of the central massif used 4 metres (13 ft) of unreinforced concrete, while the caserne walls, judged to be less exposed, used 1.5 metres (4.9 ft). Under fire, the forts were damaged by 21cm fire and could not withstand heavier artillery.

== Armament ==
Marchovelette's main armament was concentrated in the central massif and included:

- One 21 cm gun turret with a single gun
- One 15 cm gun turret with two guns
- Two 12 cm gun turrets with one gun
- Three retracting 57mm rapid-fire gun turrets for close defense
- Five 57 mm guns in embrasures defending the ditch

The fort's heavy guns were German, typically Krupp, while the turret mechanisms were from a variety of sources. The fort was provided with signal lights to permit communication with neighboring forts. The guns were fired using black powder rather than smokeless powder, producing choking gas in the confined firing spaces that spread throughout the fort.

== Manning ==
In 1914 the Fort de Marchovelette was under the command of Captain-Commandant Duchâteau, whose garrison amounted to about 300 artillerymen and 100 infantry.

== First World War ==
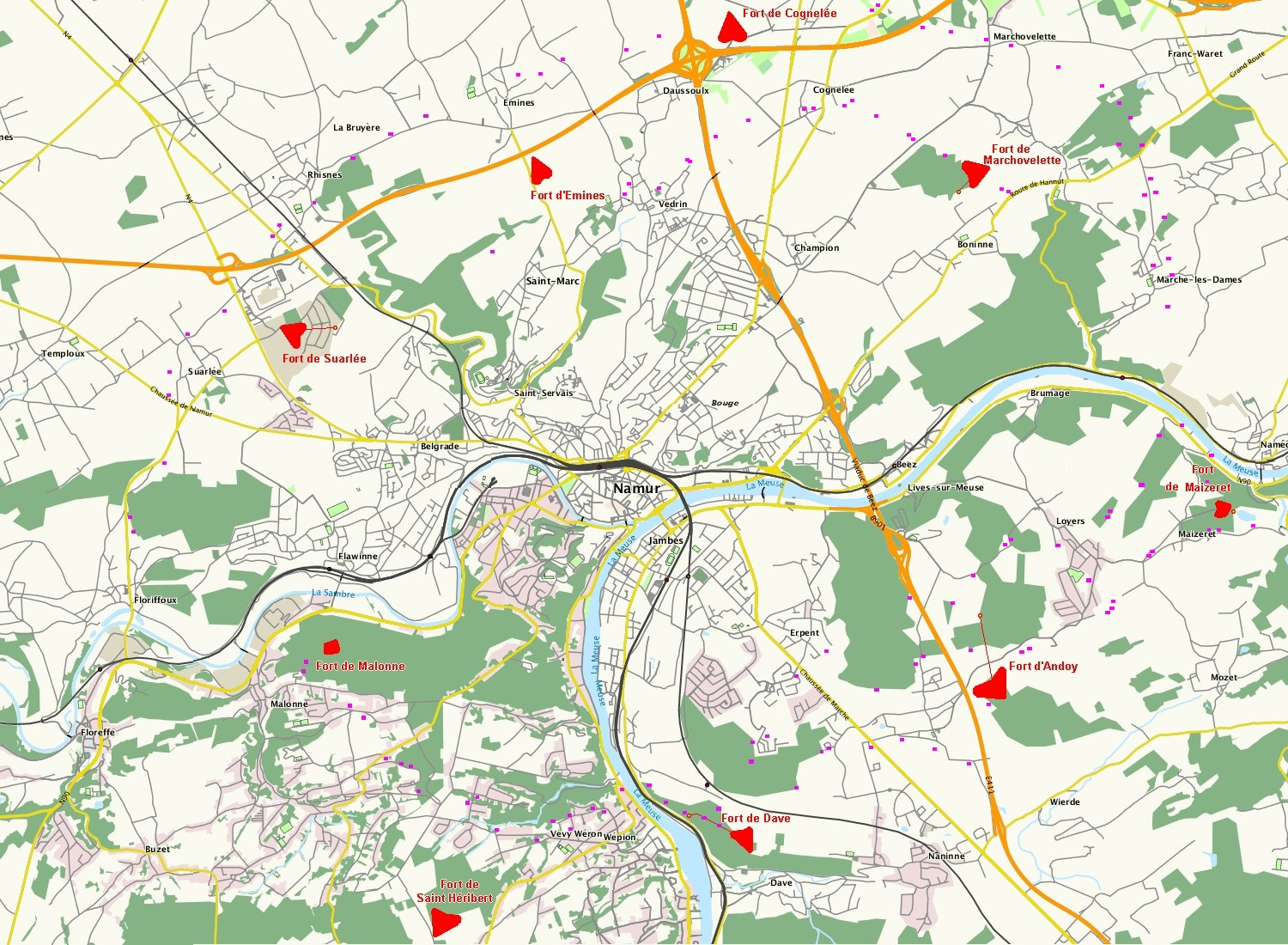
The forts of Namur

Marchovelette first opened fire on German forces on 20 August 1914. The fort was directly attacked the next day. The fort surrendered after suffering heavy bombardment by guns of up to 420mm caliber. On 23 August the fort suffered an explosion in a powder charge, incapacitating Captain-Commandant Duchâteau, and precipitating its surrender shortly thereafter. The garrison suffered 20 dead. The captured prisoners were sent to Munster.

== Fortified Position of Namur ==
Marchovelette's armament was upgraded in the 1930s to become part of the Fortified Position of Namur, which was planned to deter a German incursion over the nearby border. The 21 cm turret was replaced with a twin 75mm turret, the 15 cm turret was replaced by a turret with machine guns and grenade launchers, and the 57mm turrets were replaced with retractable turrets, each with a single 75mm gun. Machine guns were installed for local protection and for air defense, and an air intake-observation tower was built some distance away from the fort. Protection was substantially increased. This was accompanied by improvements to ventilation, protection, sanitary facilities, communications and electrical power. The garrison in 1940 amounted to 250 men under the command of Captain-Commandant de Lombaerdt.

== Second World War ==
In 1940 during the Battle of Belgium Marchovelette was attacked by German forces on 11 May, and surrendered on 18 May after German troops became enlodged on the central massif. The garrison suffered three dead.

== Present ==
The fort's site has been used as a military and police training ground. The air intake tower remains visible at the edge of the woods.

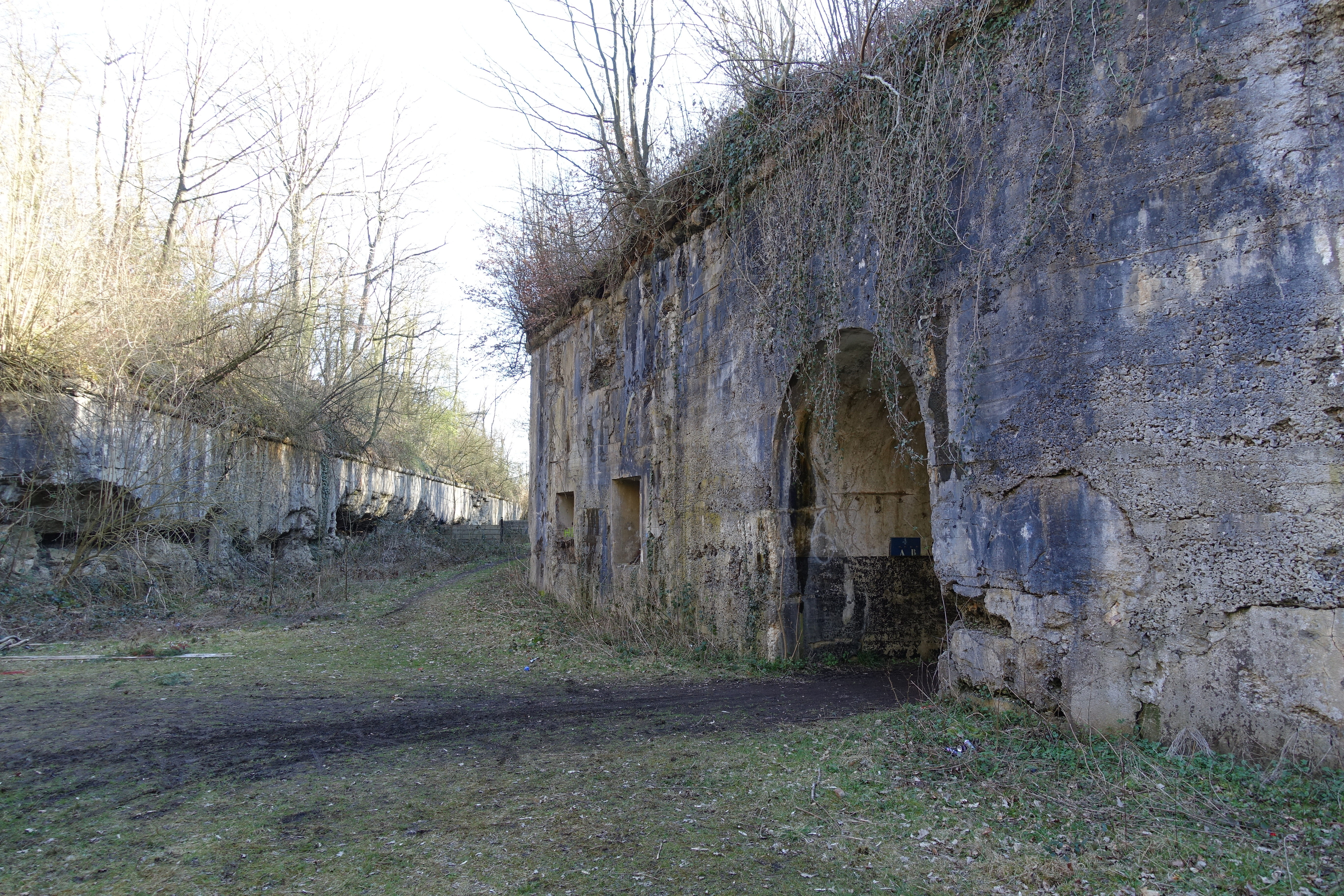
Entrance seen from inside

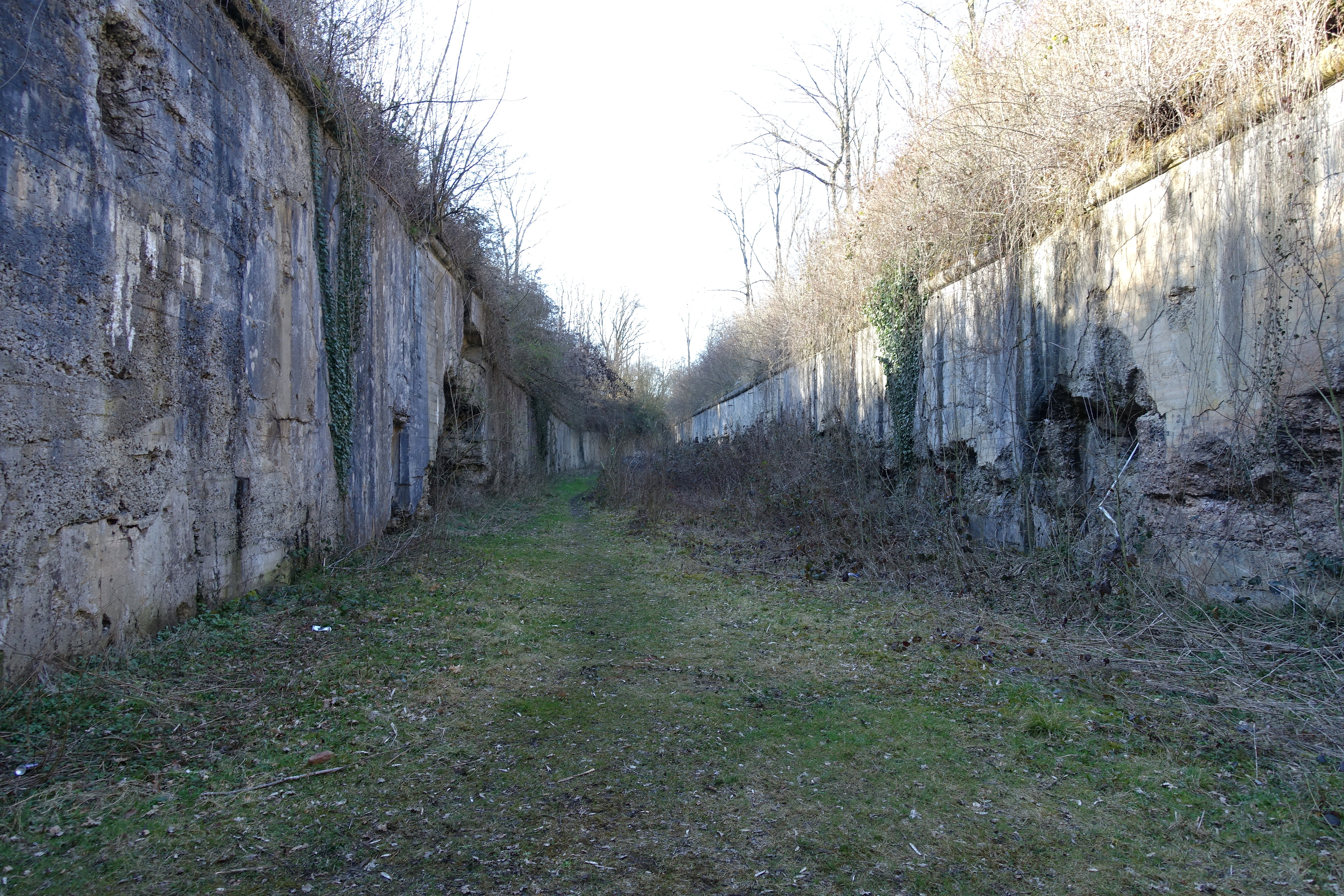
Dry ditch

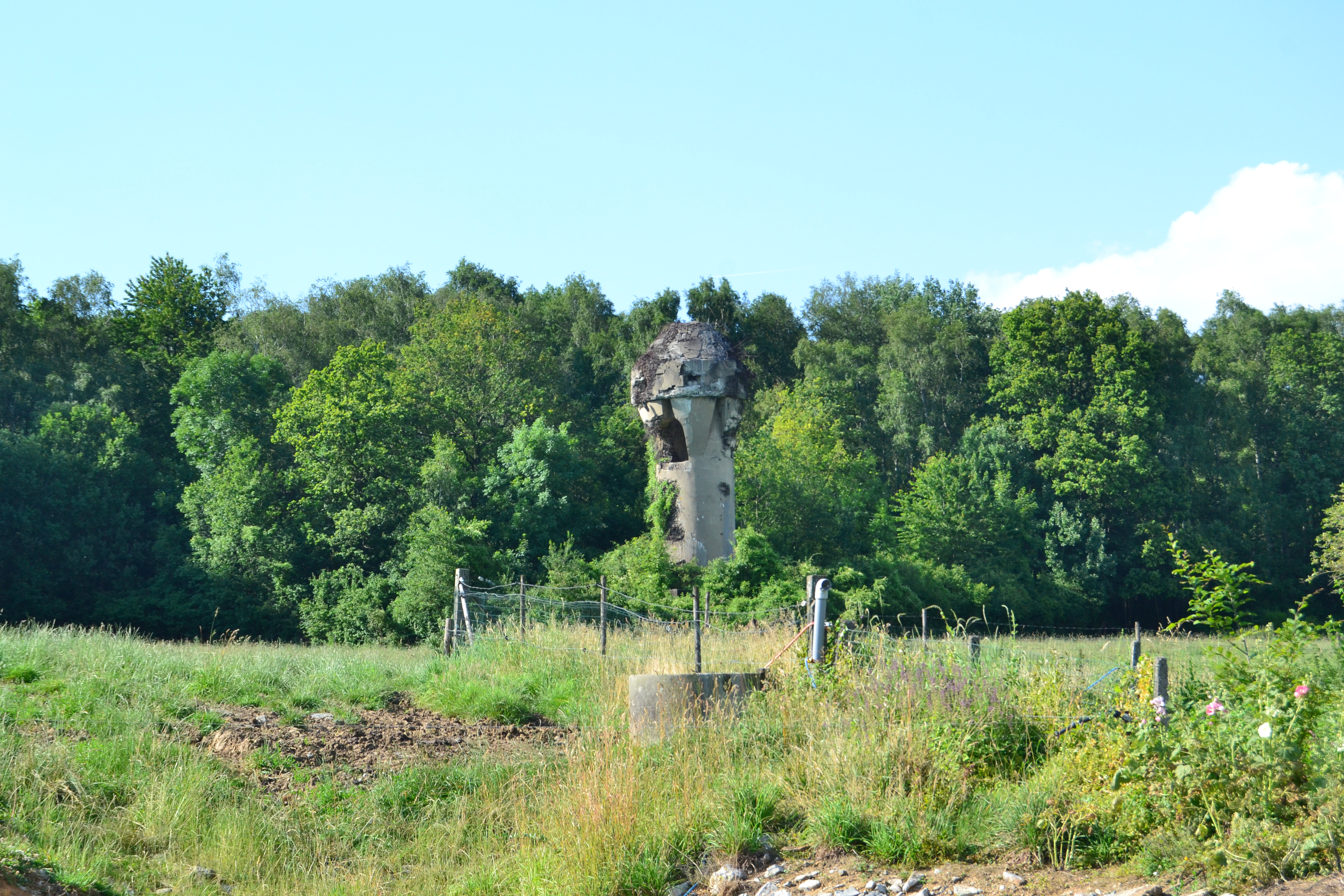
Air intake tower

Media related to Fort de Marchovelette at Wikimedia Commons

== Bibliography ==
- Donnell, Clayton, The Forts of the Meuse in World War I, Osprey Publishing, Oxford, 2007, ISBN 978-1-84603-114-4.
- Kauffmann, J.E., Jurga, R., Fortress Europe: European Fortifications of World War II, Da Capo Press, USA, 2002, ISBN 0-306-81174-X.
