= Cortil-Wodon =

Village and district in Namur, Belgium

Coordinates: 50°34′N 4°56′E

Cortil-Wodon (Walloon: Corti-Wodon) is a village of Wallonia and a district of the municipality of Fernelmont, located in the province of Namur, Belgium.

It was formerly a municipality itself until the fusion of Belgian municipalities in 1977.

It was the site of every edition of the annual Rhâââ Lovely Festival, from 2000 until 2008 inclusive.
