= Bierwart =

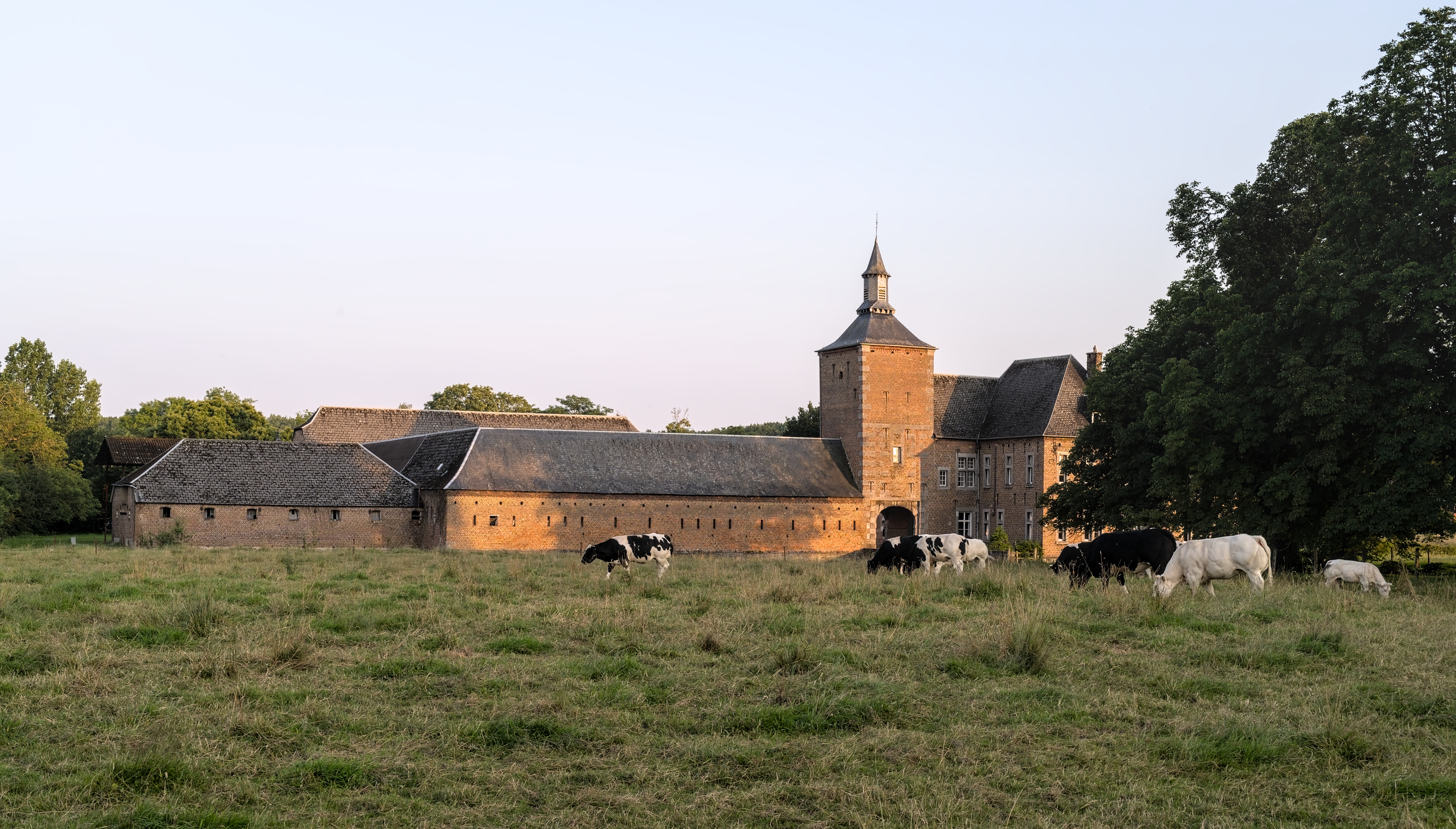
- Bierwart, Ferme-Château de Bierwart

- Location within Belgium Location within Europe
- Coordinates: 50°33′24″N 05°02′09″E
- Country: Belgium
- Region: Wallonia
- Province: Namur
- Municipality: Fernelmont

Bierwart is a district of the municipality of Fernelmont, located in the province of Namur in Wallonia, Belgium.

The district originally consisted of two villages, Bierwart and Otreppe. Otreppe is attested in written sources for the first time in 1034, and Bierwart somewhat later, in the 12th century. There are two historical large estates in the area, the Ferme-Château de Bierwart (built 1600–1604) and the Ferme d'Otreppe (attested since 1034, current buildings from the 19th century). The village church, built in 1872 in a Neo-Romanesque style, replaced a medieval church building.
