= Redmond O'Toole =

Irish musician

Redmond O'Toole is an Irish classical guitarist who performs on a Brahms guitar. His former teachers include Oscar Ghiglia, Paul Galbraith, Graham Devine and John Feeley. He studied at the Dublin Institute of Technology and the Accademia Musicale Chigiana in Siena.

O'Toole performs as a soloist or with orchestra. He was a founder member of the Dublin Guitar Quartet and has worked with musicians such as Cora Venus Lunny and Elizabeth Cooney. He has also toured Europe with traditional Irish group The Chieftains.

== Discography ==
- Baroque - 2008, Bornheim Klassik (BKCD6878)
- Movements - 2006, Bornheim Klassik (BKCD6877)
- Deleted Pieces (Dublin Guitar Quartet) - 2006, Greyslate Records

== Sources ==
- http://www.classicallinks.ie/profile.asp?ID=30
- http://www.rte.ie/tv/theview/archive/20070116.html
- http://www.rte.ie/radio/mooneygoeswild/fp2007/january17.html
- http://www.rte.ie/arts/2006/1129/theeleventhhour.html
