= Don Millard =

Don Millard (born November 28, 1955) is the Directorate Head of the Engineering Directorate at the National Science Foundation (NSF). Prior to joining NSF, he was a faculty member at Rensselaer Polytechnic Institute and the originator of the Mobile Studio Project. In 1999 he started thinking about a way to enable students to perform experiments anytime, anyplace—specifically those that use an oscilloscope, function generator, digital control, and some form of power supply. He started the Mobile Studio project by looking at commercially available solutions, which were prohibitively expensive; while choosing to involve students in bringing the project's vision to reality. Jason Coutermarsh, then a student at Rensselaer Polytechnic Institute (RPI), joined the project in the summer of 2004 and they developed a complete functional input/output board (IOBoard) hardware/software prototype. With the support of several technology companies and the National Science Foundation, the Mobile Studio Project is now being utilized to enhance science, math, engineering and technology education around the world.

== Life ==
Born in Chicago, Illinois to Harold and Shirley Millard on November 28, 1955, Don grew up in Skokie, Illinois and began playing guitar at age 10. He traveled with the musical group Up With People in 1973–1974, after which he attended college at the University of Illinois at Urbana-Champaign and Worcester Polytechnic Institute (WPI). He obtained a B.S. in electrical engineering from WPI and attended graduate school at Rensselaer Polytechnic Institute (RPI), in Troy, NY. He did his doctoral work in the areas of plasma physics and electrical testing; generating a patent for the development of a laser-induced, plasma-based "Non-Contact Electrical Pathway," which is used to functionally test ultra fine-pitch electrical components.

== Career ==
He first joined RPI as an instructor in 1983 (while a graduate student) and began teaching courses and performing manufacturing related research within the school of engineering. Prior to joining the university, he spent two years as a biomedical engineer at Veteran's Administration Hospital in Albany, NY; two years involved with cardiac monitor design at Electronics for Medicine, in Sudbury, MA.

During his many years at RPI, he served as an award-winning faculty member of the Electrical, Computer, and Systems Engineering Department and had several administrative roles. He was a member of Rensselaer's Center for Integrated Electronics (including six years as the director), served as the technical director of the Design and Manufacturing Institute, and was a senior project manager for the Center for Manufacturing Productivity and Technology Transfer. He created and directed the Academy of Electronic Media at RPI, which specializes in the development and use of engaging interactive electronic media and educational technology. The academy's developments have won a number of national awards, such as the distinguished 2003 Premier Award for Excellence in Engineering Education Courseware.

== Music ==
He has continued his involvement in music since traveling with Up With People, often playing in various bands (e.g. Carriage House, Deuce) and serving as a guitarist for other artists. He has written a number of songs and has compiled them in an album that is titled "Alternatives." A number of his songs have been available via the internet since the mid-1990s and have been used in a variety of his multimedia performances.
