= Fernelmont Castle =

Castle in Wallonia, Belgium

Coordinates: 50.546°N 4.987°E

- Belgium
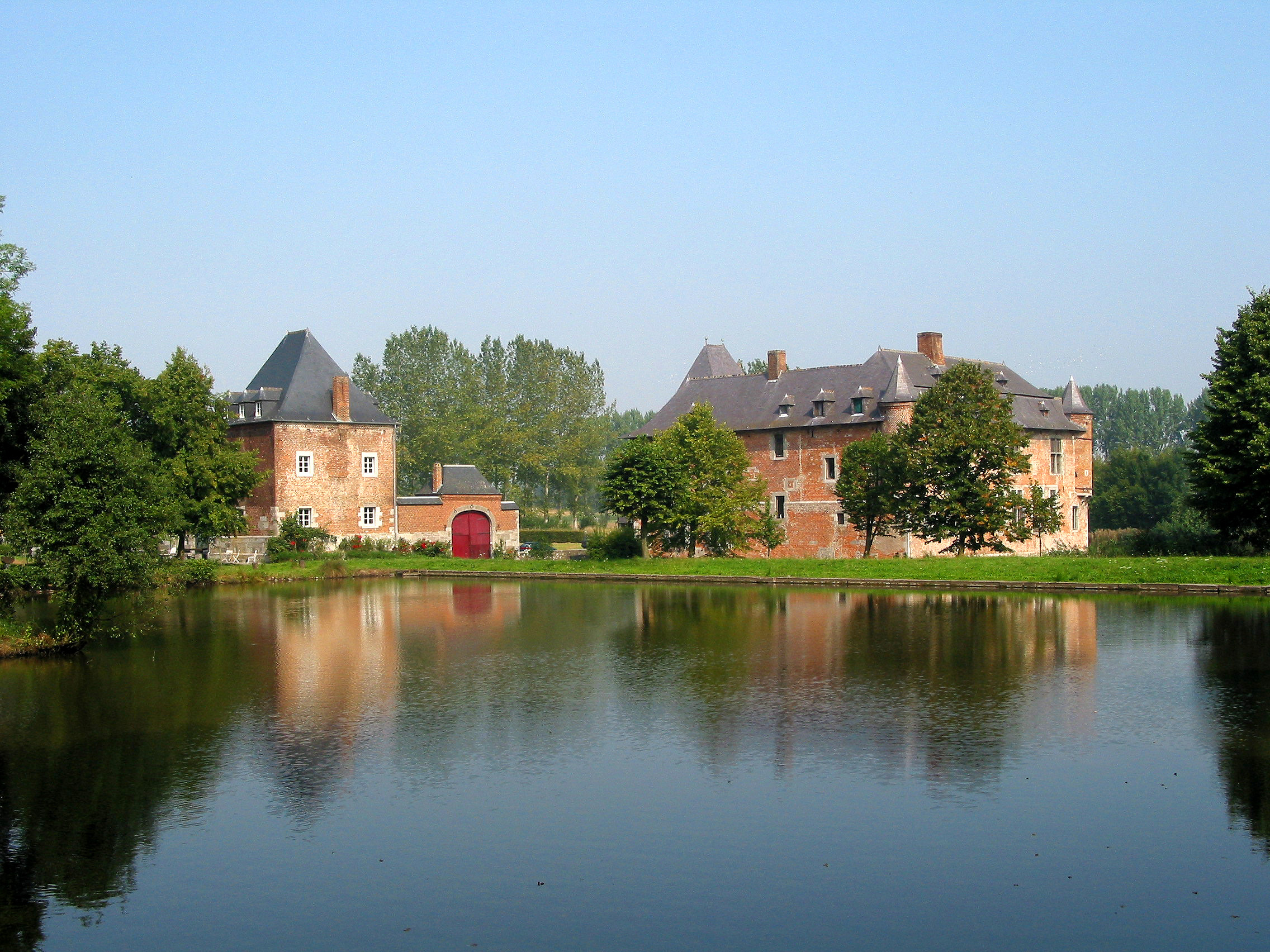
- Fernelmont castle

Site information
- Type: Castle

Fernelmont Castle (French: Château de Fernelmont) is a fortified farmhouse or château-ferme in Noville-les-Bois in the municipality of Fernelmont, Wallonia, Belgium.

== See also ==
- List of castles in Belgium
- Isabelle Brunelle

== Sources ==
- Official website (in French)
