= Sweek =

Sweek is a surname. Notable people with the surname include:

- Bill Sweek (born 1947), American basketball player and coach
- John Sweek (fl. 1850s), namesake of American residence John Sweek House

== See also ==
- Sweeck, surname
