= Mobile Studio =

Laboratory hardware/software project

The National Science Foundation supported Mobile Studio Project, or Mobile Studio, is developing pedagogy and hardware/software which, when connected to a PC (via USB), provides functionality similar to that of laboratory equipment (scope, function generator, power supplies, DMM, etc.) typically associated with an instrumented studio classroom. The Mobile Studio IOBoard is a small, inexpensive hardware platform for use in a home, classroom or remote environment. When coupled with the Mobile Studio Desktop software, the system duplicates a large amount of the hardware often used to teach Electrical Engineering, Computer Engineering, Control Systems, and Physics courses; among others. With the support of several technology companies (ADI, HP, and Maxim) and the National Science Foundation, the Mobile Studio Project is now being utilized to enhance science, math, engineering and technology education around the world. The project's goal is to enable hands-on exploration of science and engineering principles, devices, and systems that have historically been restricted to expensive laboratory facilities.

== History ==
=== Beginnings ===
In 1999, Rensselaer Polytechnic Institute professor Don Millard started thinking about a way to enable students to perform experiments whenever and wherever they desire — experiments that use an oscilloscope, function generator, digital control and some form of power supply. The project started by looking at commercially available solutions; which were found to be prohibitively expensive since the desire was to keep the cost of the solution similar to the price of an engineering textbook.

=== Motivation ===
The Academy of Electronic Media Mobile Studio Project's inspiration was drawn from a generation of engineering students that has virtually no tinkering background. Instead of taking apart devices and building things with erector sets, students now manipulate computer software. Additionally, the level of integration is so sophisticated in today’s electronics that even if students did crack them open, it’s not clear how much they would garner from it. Simple circuit boards that stimulated the imagination with their discrete components and space for soldering and tinkering - have since given way to multilayered boards with complex ICs and circuitry too small to see.

== The Mobile Studio IOBoard ==
=== Hardware ===
The hardware component of the system is a small printed circuit board, referred to as the IOBoard, which was developed by Jason Coutermarsh (as a part of his Rensselaer degree programs) and Dr. Don Lewis Millard. The IOBoard is populated with the components required to implement an oscilloscope, function generator, spectrum analyzer, voltmeter, and digital input/output control. The hardware connects to a PC via USB, and is powered by the user's PC, eliminating the need for a bulky AC transformer.

=== Software ===
The Mobile Studio Desktop software, designed by Jason Coutermarsh, provides the user with "benchtop equivalent" displays that mimic their physical counterparts. In addition to providing standard instrumentation options, the software takes advantage of the processing power of the personal computer, giving the user access to features typically found on high-end equipment, along with the ability to easily save data and screen images.

=== Expandability ===
The Mobile Studio IOBoard is easily expandable using an on-board daughterboard connector. Nearly all the IOBoard resources can be accessed by a daughterboard, allowing a user to enhance current features or add completely new options. The Mobile Studio Desktop application software is also easily expandable by way of a "Plug-in" system. The software automatically finds and loads both new hardware drivers and new features that can be installed at any time after the main application. This ensures that both the hardware and software are never out of date.

== Participants ==
=== Academic ===
- Rensselaer Polytechnic Institute
- Howard University
- Morgan State University
- Rose-Hulman Institute of Technology
- University at Albany, SUNY
- University of Wisconsin-Madison

=== Industry ===
- Analog Devices
- Hewlett-Packard
- Maxim Integrated Products
- Molex Connector Corporation
- National Science Foundation
- PCBExpress

== See also ==
- Electronic test equipment
- Oscilloscope
