= Migala =

Spanish musical group

- Origin: Spain
- Genres: Post-rock
- Years active: 1996–2005
- Labels: Acuarela Discos; Sub Pop
- Past members: Abel Hernández; Diego Yturriaga; Coque Yturriaga; Rodrigo Hernández; Rubén Moreno; Jordi Sancho; Kieran Stephen; Nacho R. Piedra; Nacho Vegas

Migala was a rock-based experimental band hailing from Madrid, Spain. The band was known for its complex, varied, and often cathartic musical arrangements, heavily influenced by pop, post-rock, folk, and traditional Spanish music.

Although Migala have split up, giving their last concert at the Festival Internacional de Benicàssim, members of the band continue to be involved in various musical projects: Abel with El Hijo, playing with the musicians Raúl Fernández, Xavi Mole and Kieran Stephen; and Kieran Stephen records under the name of Fantasy Bar. Nacho Vegas, Manta Ray's ex-guitarist, was a member of Migala from Arde up until La Increíble Aventura, while at the same time releasing albums under his own name and with his band, Las Esferas Invisibles.

== Discography ==
- Diciembre 3 a.m. (1997, Acuarela)
- Así duele un verano (1998, Acuarela)
- Arde (2000, Acuarela)
- Restos de un incendio (2001, Acuarela)
- La increíble Aventura (2004, Acuarela)

== El Hijo ==
- La Piel del Oso EP (2006, Acuarela)
- Canciones Gringas EP (2006, Acuarela)
- Las Otras Vidas LP (2007, Acuarela)

== Fantasy Bar ==
- Friday Afternoon Car (June 2008, Acuarela)
