= Marchovelette =

Marchovelette Måtchovlete (Walloon)
- Village
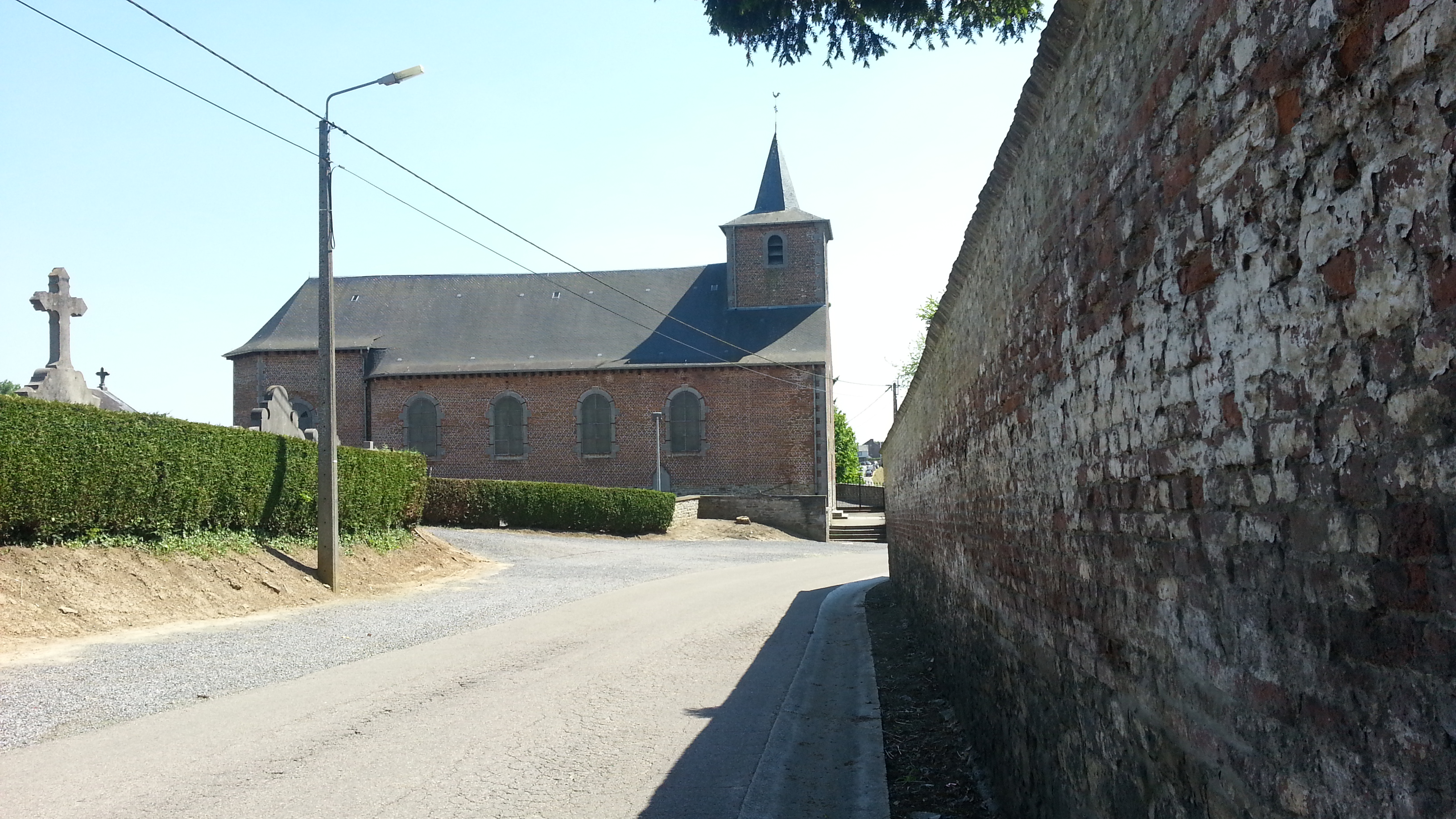

- Location in Belgium
- Coordinates: 50°31′N 04°56′E
- Country: Belgium
- Region: Wallonia
- Province: Namur
- Municipality: Fernelmont

Area
  - Total: 5.01 km^{2} (1.93 sq mi)
- Elevation: 187 m (614 ft)

Population (1 January 2017)
  - Total: 798
  - Density: 159/km^{2} (413/sq mi)
- Postal code: 5380
- Website: fernelmont.be (in French)

Marchovelette (Walloon: Måtchovlete) is a village of Wallonia and a district of the municipality of Fernelmont, located in the province of Namur, Belgium.

It was formerly a municipality itself until the fusion of Belgian municipalities in 1977.

== See also ==
- Fort de Marchovelette
