= Summa (Pärt) =

1977 musical composition by Arvo Pärt

Summa is a composition by Estonian composer Arvo Pärt. It was initially written in 1977 as a choral work (a setting of the Credo), then later scored by Pärt for instruments. It has been described as "gently rocked muted harmonic simplicities back and forth" when it was performed by the Kronos Quartet in 1992.
