= Fernelmont =

Municipality in Wallonia, Belgium

Fernelmont Ferneamont (Walloon)
- Municipality
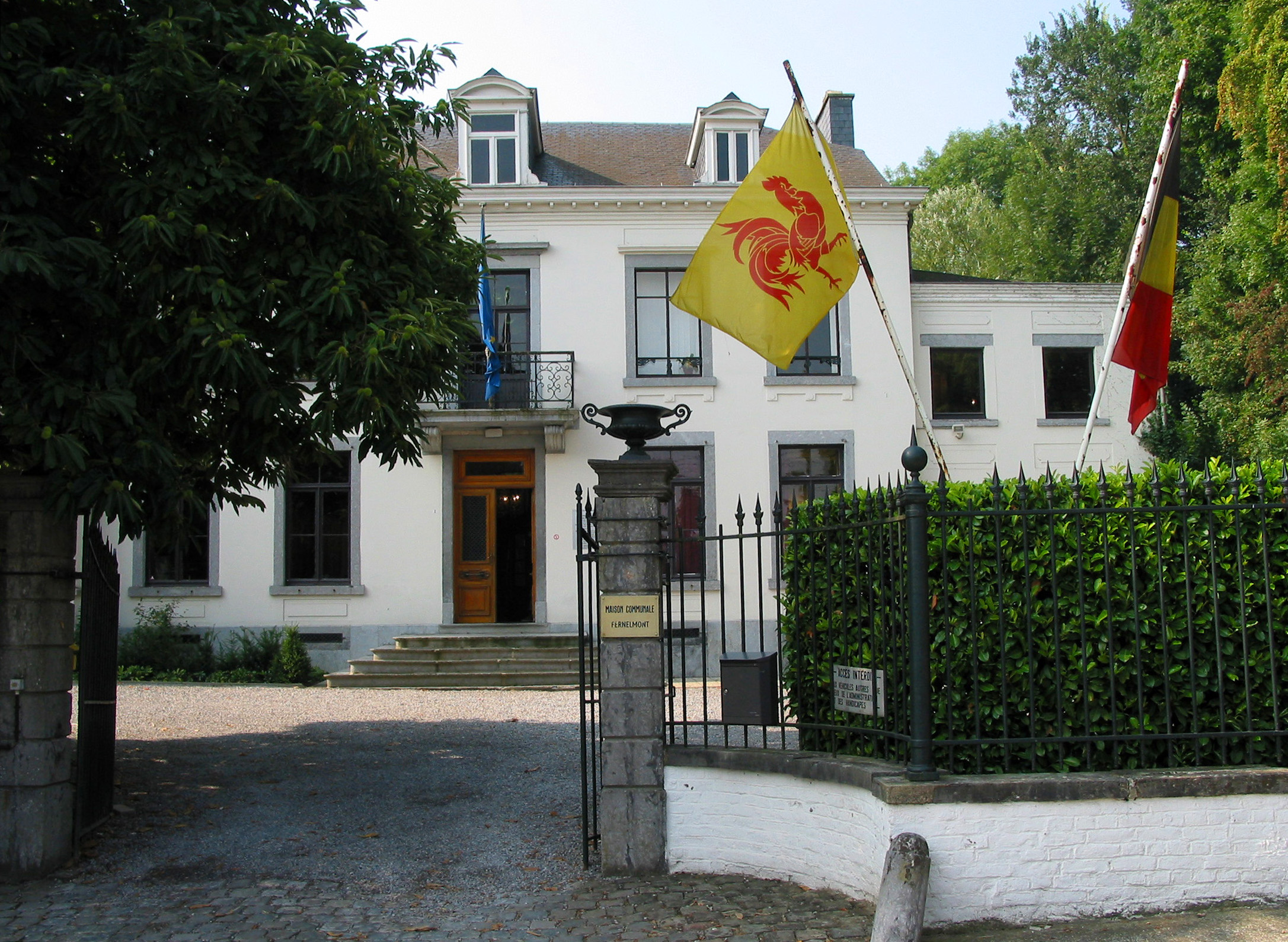
- Town hall of Fernelmont

- Flag Coat of arms

- Location of Fernelmont in Namur Province
- Interactive map of Fernelmont
- Location in Belgium
- Coordinates: 50°33′N 04°59′E
- Country: Belgium
- Community: French Community
- Region: Wallonia
- Province: Namur
- Arrondissement: Namur

Government
  - Mayor: Christelle Plomteux
  - Governing party: LDB

Area
  - Total: 65.82 km^{2} (25.41 sq mi)

Population (2023-01-01)
  - Total: 8,218
  - Density: 124.9/km^{2} (323.4/sq mi)
- Postal codes: 5380
- NIS code: 92138
- Area codes: 081
- Website: www.fernelmont.be

Fernelmont (French pronunciation: [fɛʁnɛlmɔ̃]; Walloon: Ferneamont) is a municipality of Wallonia located in the province of Namur, Belgium.

On 1 October 2018, Fernelmont had a total population of 8,007. The total area is 65.61 km^{2} which gives a population density of 122 inhabitants per km^{2}.

The municipality consists of the following districts: Bierwart, Cortil-Wodon, Forville, Franc-Waret, Hemptinne, Hingeon, Marchovelette, Noville-les-Bois, Pontillas, and Tillier.

== History ==
The municipality of Fernelmont was officially created on 3 January 1977, during the fusion of the Belgian municipalities, through the fusion of ten former municipalities, which now exist as ten districts within Fernelmont. It was named Fernelmont (Ash Tree Mountain) after a 13th-century castle which was positioned more or less at the centre of the newly created municipality. None of the villages comprising the municipality has ever been called Fernelmont, and the Maison Communale (town hall) is in Noville-les-Bois.

== Economy ==
The municipality includes a "Zone d'Activités Économiques" (Z.A.E. / light industrial zone), south of the village of Noville-les-Bois, designed to accommodate small and medium-sized non-polluting businesses, covering an area of up to 120 hectares. At the end of 2010 the Z.A.E. already covered more than 50 hectares, having welcomed around 100 small and medium-sized enterprises, and slightly more than 800 people were employed in the zone.

== Culture and sights ==
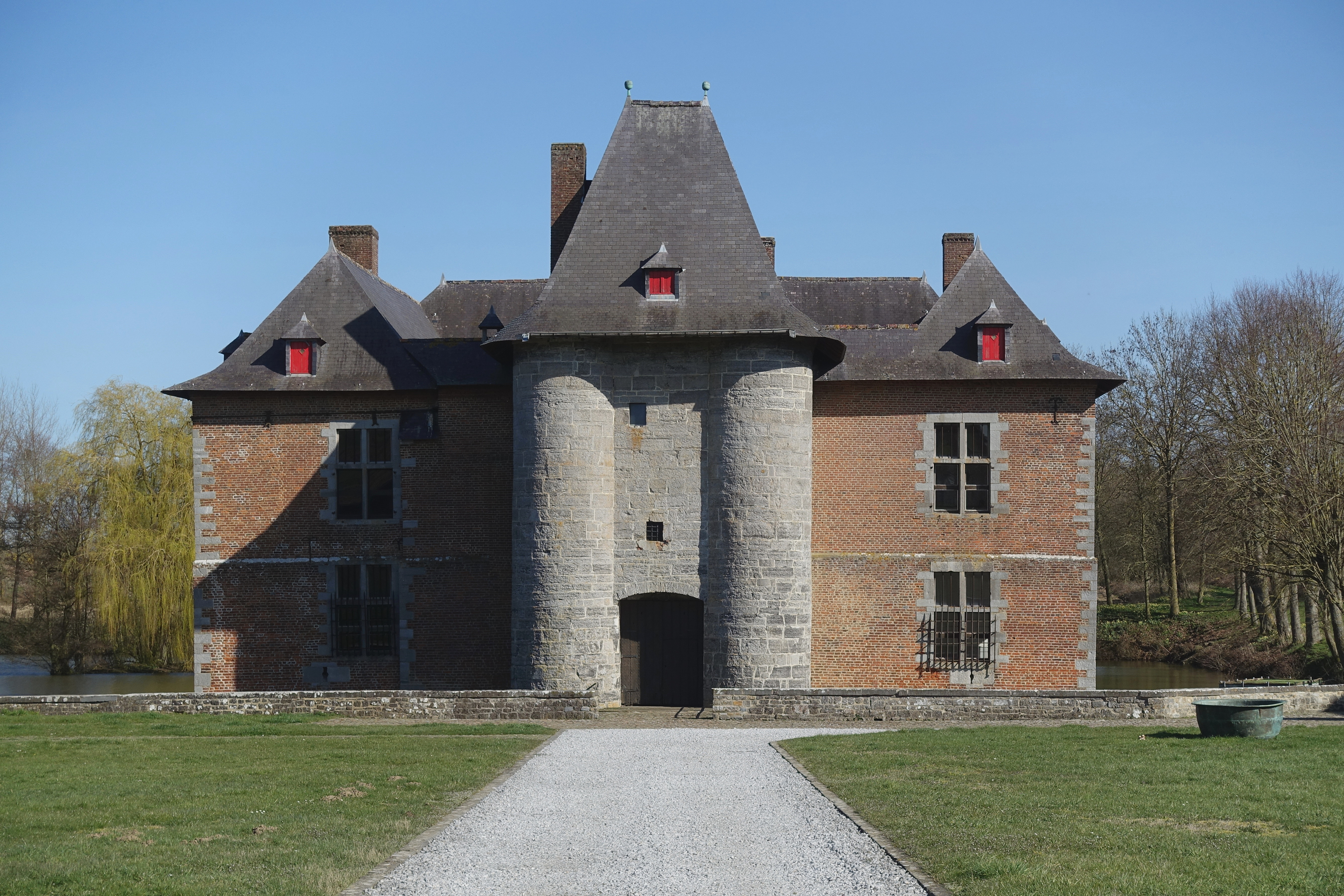
Fernelmont Castle, the 13th century keep from which the municipality takes its name.

== Twin city ==
- Coursac, France
