= Noville-les-Bois =

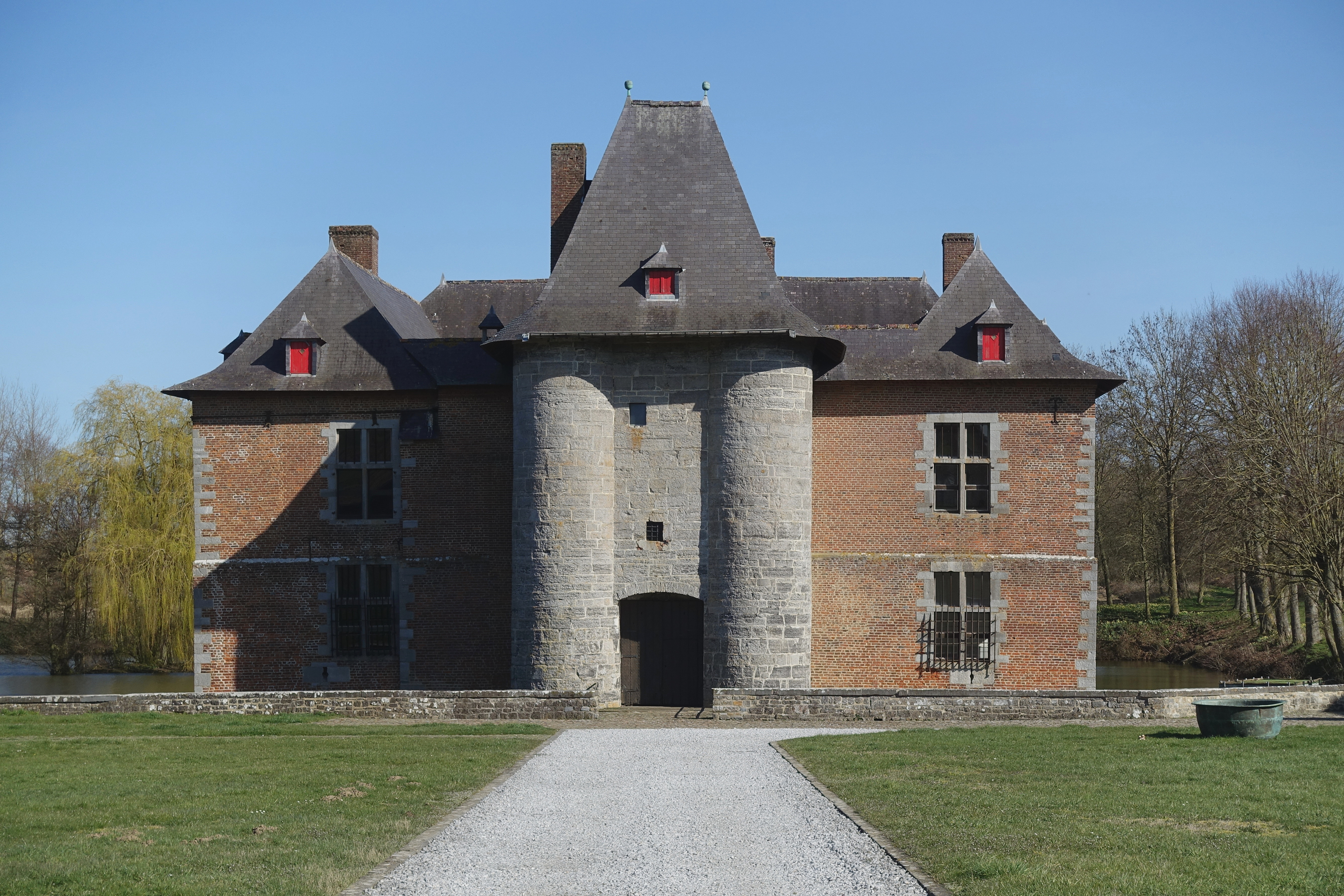
- Noville-les-Bois, Fernelmont Castle

- Coat of arms

- Location within Belgium Location within Europe
- Coordinates: 50°33′25″N 04°59′08″E
- Country: Belgium
- Region: Wallonia
- Province: Namur
- Municipality: Fernelmont

Noville-les-Bois is a district of the municipality of Fernelmont, located in the province of Namur in Wallonia, Belgium.

The village dervies its name from the Noville family, who were the medieval owners of the land. Fernelmont Castle, that has given its name to the modern municipality of Fernelmont, dates from the 1290s. Its original keep is one of the most well-preserved keeps in Wallonia and classified as an exceptional monument by the region (monument exceptionnel). The village also contains several historical farm houses and a village church dating in its current form from 1772.
