= Jeonju International Sori Festival =

Music festival in South Korea

Coordinates: 35.8255°N 127.1320°E

- Jeonju Int'l Sori Festival logo
- Genre: Traditional music, world music
- Dates: Autumn
- Locations: Jeonju, South Korea
- Years active: 2001–present
- Website: http://www.sorifestival.com

Jeonju International Sori Festival

- Jeonju International Sori Festival
- Hangul: 전주세계소리축제
- Hanja: 全州世界소리祝祭
- RR: Jeonju segye sori chukje
- MR: Chŏnju segye sori ch'ukche

Founded in 2001, Jeonju International Sori Festival (전주세계소리축제) is South Korea's main event for traditional music and, since 2011, world music. In 2012, 2013, and 2014, Songlines listed Jeonju Sori Festival among the World's Best 25 International Festivals, the only Asian festival in the list.

== History and editions ==
About the 8 first editions:

Year	Edition	Dates	Site	Performers
2001	1	Oct.13 – 21, 2001	Sori Arts Center of Jeollabuk-do	142 teams, 15 countries
2002	2	Aug.24 – Sep.1, 2002	Sori Arts Center of Jeollabuk-do, Traditional culture spaces	156 teams, 16 countries
2003	3	Sep.27 – Oct.5, 2003	Sori Arts Center of Jeollabuk-do, Jeonju Traditional Culture Center	172 teams, 14 countries
2004	4	Oct.16 – 22, 2004	Sori Arts Center of Jeollabuk-do, Chonbuk National University	190 teams, 14 countries
2005	5	Sep.27 – Oct.3, 2005	Sori Arts Center of Jeollabuk-do, across Jeonju	190 teams, 25 countries
2006	6	Sep.16 – 24, 2006	Sori Arts Center of Jeollabuk-do, Jeonju Hanok Village	184 teams, 22 countries
2007	7	Oct.6 – 14, 2007	Sori Arts Center of Jeollabuk-do, across Jeonju	131 teams, 10 countries
2008	8	Sep.26 – Oct.4, 2008	Sori Arts Center of Jeollabuk-do, Jeonju Hanok Village	280 teams, 16 countries
2010	9	Oct.1 – 5, 2010	Sori Arts Center of Jeollabuk-do, Jeonju Hanok Village	3,000 artists, 9 countries, 150,000 visitors
2011	10	Sep.30 – Oct.4, 2011	Sori Arts Center of Jeollabuk-do, Jeonju Hanok Village	1,161 artists, 9 countries, 212,831 visitors
2012	11	Sep.13 – Sep.17, 2012	Sori Arts Center of Jeollabuk-do, Jeonju Hanok Village	1,592 artists, 18 countries, 228,519 visitors
2013	12	Oct.2 – 6, 2013	Sori Arts Center of Jeollabuk-do, Jeonju Hanok Village	2,834 artists, 37 countries, 281,478 visitors
2014	13	Oct.8 – 12, 2014	Sori Arts Center of Jeollabuk-do, Jeonju Hanok Village	1,300 artists, 29 countries, 302,378 visitors
2015	14	Oct.7 – 11, 2015	Sori Arts Center of Jeollabuk-do, Jeonju Hanok Village	1,300 artists, 28 countries, 170,242 visitors

- Commissioners: Chun Idoo (2001–2003), Ahn Sook-sun (2004–2008), Kim Myung-gon (2009–2010), Park Kolleen and Kim Hyeongseok (2011–2013), Park Jechun (2014–present)

== Events and program ==
The Jeonju Int'l Sori Festival is held every fall in the Sori Arts Center of Jeollabuk-do and various venues in Jeollabuk-do, with indoor and outdoor programs, Sori Festival for Kids, Master Classes of Masters and Master Sori Artists, and other workshops. All the great masters of gugak (Korean traditional music, for instance pansori and pungmul) perform in a festival that welcomes artists from all over the world.

== See also ==
- List of music festivals in South Korea
- List of folk festivals
