= Society for Musicology in Ireland =

The Society for Musicology in Ireland (SMI) is an Irish learned society in the field of musicology. Founded in 2003, it reflects the growing research activity and the increasing academic tuition available at Irish universities in the fields of music and musicology that has been visible since the early 1990s. Since 2011, the SMI benefits from charitable tax exemption by the Revenue Commissioners.

== Overview ==
The SMI was founded in acknowledgement of the immense increase in musical scholarship on the island of Ireland since the early 1990s. While a number of the founding members had previously been members of the Royal Musical Association (RMA) (United Kingdom), the dynamic growth of the field in Ireland (including Northern Ireland) has led to the inauguration of an independent society with friendly links to the RMA.

The SMI's constitution describes the main object of the society as "the advancement of education, specifically in the field of musicology, and to promote and foster musical scholarship in all its forms throughout Ireland, north and south by organizing annual conferences, generating publications, and maintaining a website which contains relevant expert resources which are freely and publicly available".

The society organises an annual plenary conference, usually around June, an annual postgraduate plenary conference in January that is held in conjunction with the Irish national committee of the International Council for Traditions of Music and Dance as well as a number of associated events per year on varying topics on the initiative of music departments around the country.

Members and other scholars publish their research in the peer-reviewed Journal of the Society for Musicology in Ireland (JSMI) and the book series Irish Musical Studies.

The society has a strong working relationship with the Research Foundation for Music in Ireland (RFMI), maintained by the TU Dublin Conservatory of Music and Drama and which, since 2012, houses the SMI Library. Furthermore, the SMI represents the Irish committee for RILM (through the RFMI), RISM and IAML.

=== Presidents ===
- Harry White (University College Dublin), 2003–2006
- Jan Smaczny (Queen's University Belfast), 2006–2012
- Kerry Houston (TU Dublin Conservatory of Music and Drama), 2012–2015
- Lorraine Byrne Bodley (Maynooth University), 2015–2021
- John O'Flynn (Dublin City University), 2021–2024
- Wolfgang Marx (University College Dublin), 2024-

== Research Ireland Harrison Medal ==
Since 2004, the SMI awards the Research Ireland Harrison Medal to honour international musicologists with outstanding achievements and excellence in research in musicology. It is named in honour of the Irish musicologist Frank Llewellyn Harrison (1905–1987). Recipients include Christoph Wolff (2004), Margaret Bent (2007), Kofi Agawu (2009), Christopher Hogwood (2011), Barra Boydell and Harry White (2013), Susan Youens (2016), Jim Samson (2018), Michael Beckerman (2021), and Ita Beausang (2022).

== Publications and outreach ==
- The Journal of the Society for Musicology in Ireland (JSMI) is a peer-reviewed, open-access online journal published since 2005. Its full-text articles and other content are free to access worldwide.
- Irish Musical Studies, published in association with the SMI, is a book series reflecting musical scholarship undertaken in Ireland, covering both Irish and international subject areas. It was inaugurated in 1990 and has been under the general editorship of Gerard Gillen and Harry White until 2020. It was initially published by Irish Academic Press (volumes 1–4) and Four Courts Press (volumes 5–12). From 2022 (volume 13ff.), the series is being edited by Lorraine Byrne Bodley and Harry White and published by Boydell & Brewer.
- The Encyclopaedia of Music in Ireland (EMIR), edited by Harry White and Barra Boydell and published in 2013 with University College Dublin Press, represents the single largest research project on music in Ireland.

Outreach activities of the SMI include a dedicated YouTube channel, a public Facebook page, and a Twitter account.

== Research resources ==
- SMI Music Thesis Register – a searchable database of completed and in-progress postgraduate theses in the fields of musicology, ethnomusicology, music education, music technology, music therapy, performance, analysis, composition etc.
- SMI Library

== Honorary and Corresponding Members ==
Honorary Members of the SMI include: Ita Beausang, Hilary Bracefield, Barra Boydell, Patrick Devine, Paul Everett, Gerard Gillen, Kerry Houston, Sarah McCleave, John O'Conor, David Rhodes, Jan Smaczny, and Harry White.

Corresponding Members, defined as "honorary members who live abroad and who have made particularly notable contributions to furthering musicology in Ireland" include John Butt, Julian Horton, Barbara Kelly, Axel Klein, Harald Krebs, Sharon Krebs, John Rink, R. Larry Todd, Katharina Uhde, and Susan Youens.
