= Ita Beausang =

Irish musicologist and educator (1936–2024)

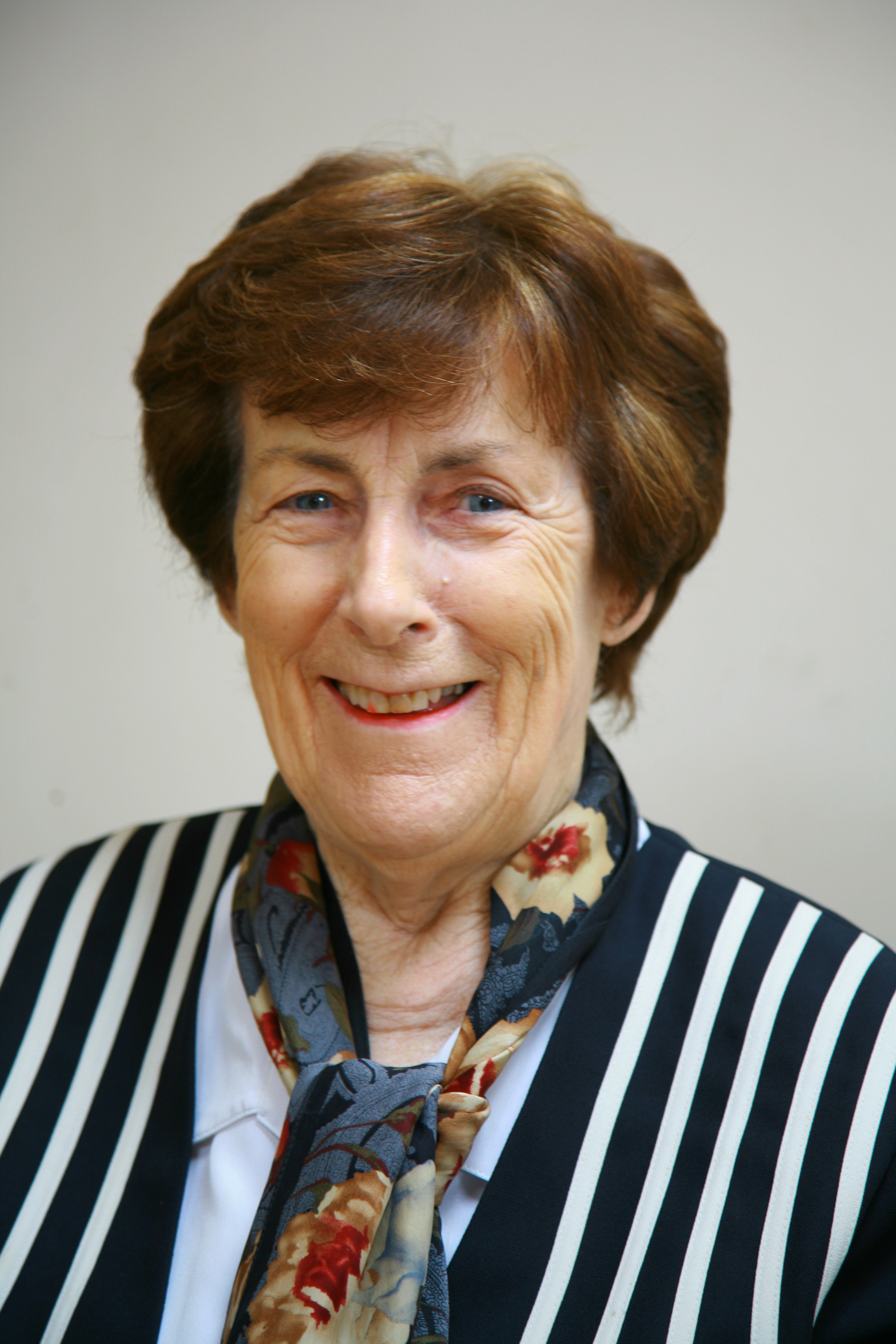
- Beausang in 2016
- Born: 18 November 1936; Cork, Ireland
- Died: 20 November 2024 (aged 88); Dublin, Ireland
- Other name: Ita Margaret Hogan
- Occupation: Musicologist

Ita Margaret Beausang (née Hogan; 18 November 1936 – 20 November 2024) was an Irish musicologist and educator. In 1962 she completed the first PhD thesis in musicology to have been written in Ireland. She specialised in Irish music of the Classical period, and in female Irish composers, in particular Ina Boyle.

== Life and career ==
Beausang was born in Cork on 18 November 1936. She studied with Aloys Fleischmann at University College Cork, graduating as Bachelor of Music (BMus, 1956) and Master of Arts (MA, 1958) before she completed the first Irish PhD thesis in musicology on "Anglo-Irish Music, 1780–1830" (1962). With some adaptations, this was the basis of her book Anglo-Irish Music, 1780–1830 (Cork University Press, 1966; published under her maiden name Ita Margaret Hogan).

From 1954 to 1960, she taught at the Cork School of Music. After her marriage and move to Dublin in 1960, she worked as a research assistant on the Royal Irish Academy's A New History of Ireland (Oxford University Press), again working with Fleischmann, during 1973–1974. In 1986, she was appointed lecturer in musicianship at the then College of Music (now the TU Dublin Conservatory of Music and Drama) and served as acting director, 1995–1996. She retired in 2001 and had since played an active role in fostering music education in Ireland, serving on the advisory group for a feasibility study, undertaken by the organisation Music Network, on "A National System of Local Music Education Services" (2001–2003). She was also a member of the executive committee of the Feis Ceoil (2003–2009).

In 2010, Beausang was awarded Honorary Membership of the Society for Musicology in Ireland (SMI). She was also awarded Honorary Life Membership of the Society for Music Education in Ireland in 2014. In 2022, she was honoured with the Harrison Medal of the Irish Research Council and the SMI.

Beausang died in Dublin on 20 November 2024, at the age of 88.

== Research interests ==
Under her maiden surname Hogan, Ita Beausang has published work on musical culture in late 18th and 19th-century Ireland, culminating in her volume Anglo-Irish Music, 1780–1830. For a long time, this study remained the only substantial text about Irish composers of a mainly Protestant background, including Charles Thomas Carter, Philip Cogan, Thomas Simpson Cooke, John Field, Michael Kelly, John Andrew Stevenson and others. The book "is recognised as a seminal text on the subject". Barra Ó Seaghdha wrote in 2016 that "the book allows later readers and scholars to pick and choose the material that suits their own purposes, or to weave it into patterns of their own, regardless of the author's views". Due to her expertise in the area, she became an Advisory Editor for the Encyclopaedia of Music in Ireland (published 2013).

According to Kelly, "Beausang's academic career has been indelibly shaped by the thinking of her mentor Aloys Fleischmann; she has notably followed his example in viewing teaching and research as two sides of the same coin". Consequently, much of her postdoctoral research has been inspired by pedagogical issues, from music education to piano pedagogy and music therapy. Beausang has repeatedly argued for a national system of music education and strongly supported initiatives of agencies such as the Forum for Music in Ireland, Music Education National Debate (MEND) and Music Education Action Group (MEAG). She also played a significant role in the establishment of the first full-time third-level performance course in Ireland, the TU Dublin Conservatory's Graduate Diploma in Music (BMus Perf.) when it was validated as a degree by Trinity College Dublin in 1990.

In later years, Beausang turned to female careers in 19th and early 20th-century Irish music, beginning with a period of research on Ina Boyle, which was finally published in book-form in 2018.

== Publications ==
=== Monographs ===
- Anglo-Irish Music, 1780–1830 (Cork: Cork University Press, 1966).
- (with Séamas de Barra) Ina Boyle (1889–1967). A Composer's Life (Cork: Cork University Press, 2018), ISBN 978-1-78205-264-7.

=== Edited volumes ===
- Jim Cooke: Coláiste an Cheoil/College of Music: A Musical Journey 1890–1993 (Dublin: DIT College of Music, 1994)
- (with Jennifer O'Connor-Madsen and Laura Watson): Women and Music in Ireland (= Irish Musical Studies vol. 13) (Woodbridge: The Boydell Press, 2022); ISBN 978-1-78327-755-1.

=== Articles and book-chapters ===
- "Aloys Fleischmann", in: New Music News (September 1992).
- "A Compositional High", in: New Music News (February 1993).
- "Dublin Musical Societies, 1850–1900", in: Patrick Devine and Harry White (eds): The Maynooth International Musicological Conference, 1995: Selected Proceedings, Part 2 (= Irish Musical Studies vol. 5) (Dublin: Four Courts Press, 1996), pp. 169–178.
- "Fleischmann the Professor", in: Ruth Fleischmann (ed.): Aloys Fleischmann (1910–1992): A Life for Music in Ireland Remembered by Contemporaries (Cork: Mercier Press, 2000), pp. 18–21.
- "Changes in Music Education in Ireland", in: The Journal of Music in Ireland, vol. 2 nos. 4, 5 (2002).
- "Where Do We Go from Here? Music Schools, the IAMS and Music Education in Ireland", in: The Journal of Music in Ireland vol. 5 no. 5 (2005), p. 22.
- (with Richard Pine): "E-Debate: Music Education", in: The Journal of Music in Ireland vol. 6 no. 2 (2006), pp. 35–36.
- "The Contemporary Music Centre: Nurturing and Promoting New Music", in: Education Magazine (January 2007).
- "From National Sentiment to Nationalist Movement, 1850–1900", in: Michael Murphy and Jan Smaczny (eds): Music in Nineteenth-Century Ireland (= Irish Musical Studies vol. 9) (Dublin: Four Courts Press, 2007), pp. 36–51.
- "The Meeting of the Waters: The Story of the Moore Statue at College St., Dublin", in: Siobhán Fitzpatrick (ed.): My Gentle Harp. Moore's Irish Melodies, 1808–2008 (Dublin: Royal Irish Academy, 2008), pp. 24–31.
- "Echoes of the Lied. Women's Vocal Repertoire in Nineteenth-Century Ireland", in: Aisling Kenny and Susan Wollenberg (eds): Women and the Nineteenth-Century Lied (Farnham, Surrey: Ashgate, 2015; new edition, London & New York: Routledge, 2016), pp. 251–258.
- "The Power of Persistence – Ina Boyle", in: Michael Dervan (ed.): The Invisible Art. A Century of Music in Ireland, 1916–2016 (Dublin: New Island, 2016), pp. 25–32.
- "'There is a calm for those who weep': William Shore's New Edition of a Chorale by John [sic] Sebastian Bach", in: Lorraine Byrne Bodley (ed.): Music Preferred. Essays in Musicology, Cultural History and Analysis in Honour of Harry White (Vienna: Hollitzer, 2018), pp. 159–165.
- "'for the support of decayed musicians and their families': The Papers of the Irish Musical Fund Society, 1787–1979", in: Michael Murphy, Maria McHale, Kerry Houston (eds): Documents of Irish Music History in the Long Nineteenth Century (= Irish Musical Studies vol. 12) (Dublin: Four Courts Press, 2019), pp. 167–181.
- "Bringing to Life the Spirit of an Age: Brian Boydell and Musical Life in Eighteenth-Century Dublin", in: Barbara Dignam and Barra Boydell (eds): Creative Impulses, Cultural Accents. Brian Boydell's Music, Advocacy, Painting and Legacy (Dublin: UCD Press, 2021), pp. 149–154.
- "Daughters of Hibernia: Seen and Not Heard?", in O'Connor Madsen/Watson/Beausang (eds), Women and Music in Ireland (Woodbridge, 2022), pp. 13–28.
