= Susan Youens =

American musicologist and author

Susan Youens (born 1947) is the author of many books on German lieder. A musicologist, her work on Franz Schubert and Hugo Wolf is considered some of the most scholarly and useful material on these composers. Both musicologists and performers have often cited her work.

As well as her books, she writes program notes for vocal recitals at Carnegie Hall in New York City. A native of Houston, Texas, she is a professor at the University of Notre Dame, as well as being a frequent guest speaker.

Her twin sister, Laura Youens-Wexler (1947–2019) was also a musicologist whose work was substantially about early Lutheran music. She was a professor emerita at George Washington University and a graduate of the Indiana University Jacobs School of Music.

Her awards include the IRC Harrison Medal of the Society for Musicology in Ireland.

== Books ==
- Franz Schubert: Die schöne Müllerin, Cambridge University Press, 1992. 123 pp. ISBN 978-0521422796.
- Heinrich Heine and the Lied, Cambridge University Press, 2007. 378 pp. ISBN 978-0521823746.
- Hugo Wolf and his Mörike Songs, Cambridge University Press, 2000. 203 pp. ISBN 978-0521027199.
- Hugo Wolf: The Vocal Music, Princeton University Press, 1992. 384 pp. ISBN 978-0691091457.
- Retracing a Winter's Journey: Franz Schubert's Winterreise, Cornell University Press, 1991. 331 pp. ISBN 978-0801499661.
- Schubert, Müller, and Die schöne Müllerin, Cambridge University Press, 1997. 245 pp. ISBN 978-0521028653.
- Schubert's Late Lieder: Beyond the Song Cycles, Cambridge University Press, 2002. 436 pp. ISBN 978-0521028752.
- Schubert's Poets and the Making of Lieder, Cambridge University Press, 1996. 384 pp. ISBN 978-0521778626.
