= Harry White (musicologist) =

Irish musicologist and poet

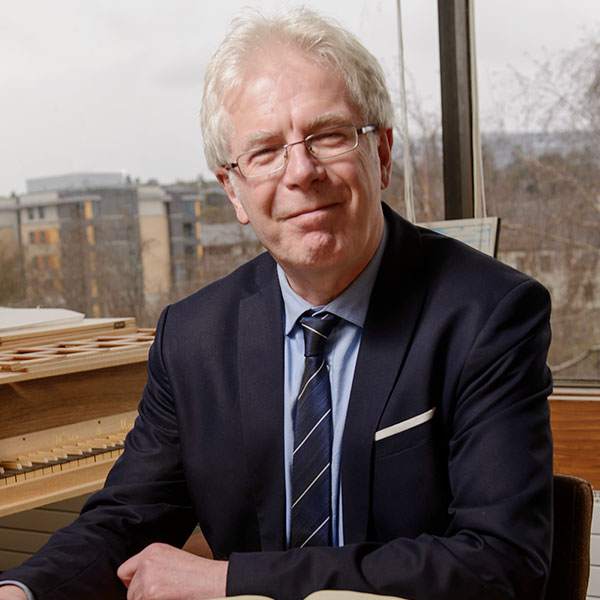
- Irish musicologist Harry White
- Born: 4 July 1958 (age 68); Dublin, Ireland
- Occupations: Musicologist and poet

Harry White (born 4 July 1958) is an Irish musicologist and university professor. With specialisations in Irish musical and cultural history, the music of the Austrian baroque composer, Johann Joseph Fux, and the development of Anglo-American musicology since 1945, he is one of the most widely published and influential academics in his areas of research. White is also a poet, with three published collections of poetry (2012, 2018, 2024).

== Education ==
Harry White was born in Dublin, to Frank White (1926–2013) and Sheila, née Danaher (1928–1988), the joint eldest (with twin brother, John) of six children. He received his early musical training at the Municipal School of Music, Dublin and at the Royal Irish Academy of Music (RIAM), where he studied cello with Aisling Drury Byrne. He was a member of the Schola Cantorum at St Finian's College, Mullingar from 1971 to 1976. He took bachelor's degrees in Music and English at University College Dublin (UCD) in 1981 and wrote a master's thesis on the plays of Harold Pinter. He completed an MA in musicology at the University of Toronto (1984), where he was elected a Junior Fellow of Massey College in 1983. Returning to Dublin, he completed his PhD at Trinity College Dublin in 1986 with a thesis on the oratorios of Johann Joseph Fux, written under the supervision of Hormoz Farhat.

== Teaching appointments ==
After teaching for a year at St Patrick's College, Maynooth (today: Maynooth University), White was appointed lecturer in music in 1985 at UCD, where he succeeded Anthony Hughes as Professor of Music in 1993. He has held visiting professorships in musicology at the University of Western Ontario (1996), LMU Munich (1999), King's College, Cambridge (2005) and the University of Zagreb (2006, 2017), and he has given invited lectures and keynote addresses at conferences and symposia across North America and Europe.

== Achievements ==
White is "an exceptionally productive scholar, whose work has been transformative. His monographs and edited volumes have been reviewed as being major works of scholarship". In 1990, he established the ongoing book series Irish Musical Studies, of which he is joint general editor with Gerard Gillen. In 1992, he instituted at UCD the first Irish taught master's degree in musicology. In 1994, he was appointed a national advisory editor for the revised, 2001 edition of The New Grove Dictionary of Music and Musicians; and in 1995 he co-organised (with Patrick Devine) the first major international musicological conference ever to be held in Ireland, at Maynooth.

The founding of the Society for Musicology in Ireland (SMI) is largely due to his vision and effort, and he served as its inaugural president from 2003 to 2006. Likewise, the publication of the Encyclopaedia of Music in Ireland (2 volumes, 2013) would have been unthinkable without White, who has argued for such a publication repeatedly from as early as 1989. He became its joint editor, with Barra Boydell.

In his many articles on Irish music and in three monographs – The Keeper's Recital (1998), The Progress of Music in Ireland (2005) and Music and the Irish Literary Imagination (2008) – he has shed new light on the central role of music in Irish cultural and intellectual life; for the last-named book he was awarded the Michael J. Durkan Prize from the American Conference for Irish Studies (ACIS).

== Honours received ==
In 2006, White became the first historical musicologist to be elected to the Royal Irish Academy after Aloys Fleischmann (1966) and John Blacking (1983). Other honours include Fellowship of the RIAM (2007) and the first DMus awarded by the National University of Ireland for published work in musicology (2007). He is also an Honorary Fellow of the Academy of St Cecilia (London). In acknowledgement of the publication of the Encyclopaedia of Music in Ireland, both editors received the Harrison Medal of the Society for Musicology in Ireland in 2014. In 2015, he was elected to the Academia Europaea, and in 2018 he was elected Corresponding Fellow of the Croatian Academy of Sciences and Arts, the first Irish person to receive this honour.

On the occasion of his sixtieth birthday in 2018, he was honoured with a festschrift, edited by Lorraine Byrne Bodley with contributions from more than 40 authors that is a testimony to White's wide research interests and his impressive circle of academic friends across the globe. David Hiley wrote of it: "This book is a fine tribute to a remarkable scholar. Not only has Harry White revealed unknown musical riches in Germany and Austria, he has set the music of Ireland in a clearer, truer perspective".

== Poetry ==
The eloquent, expressive and often poetic style of Harry White's musicological writing finds a more artistic outlet in his poetry. As a master's student in Toronto, he had already won the university's gold medal for poetry in 1984. Two published volumes of his poetry have appeared to date: Polite Forms (2012) and The Kenmare Occurrences (2018). Polite Forms has been described as "a sequence of poems that meditates on family life" that "remember and reimagine scenes from childhood and adolescence" Of his second collection, a Canadian critic wrote: "White's strength is to hold both speaker and listener at a distance that is a kind of proximity; the poems acknowledge that memory is flawed, baffling, and all we have to go on."

== Selected writings ==
=== Monographs ===
- The Keeper's Recital: Music and Cultural History in Ireland, 1770–1970 (Cork: Cork University Press, 1998), ISBN 1-85918-171-6.
- The Progress of Music in Ireland (Dublin: Four Courts Press, 2005), ISBN 1-85182-879-6.
- Music and the Irish Literary Imagination (Oxford: Oxford University Press, 2008), ISBN 978-0-19-954732-6.
- The Well-tempered Festschrift. Reading 'Music Preferred' (Vienna: Hollitzer-Verlag, 2020); ISBN 978-3-99012-780-3.
- The Musical Discourse of Servitude. Authority, Autonomy and the Work-Concept in the Music of Fux, Handel and Bach (New York: Oxford University Press, 2020); ISBN 978-0-19090-387-9.
- Fieldwork. Essays on the Cultural History of Music in Ireland (Woodbridge: The Boydell Press, 2025); ISBN 978-1-83765-232-7.

=== Edited books ===
- (with Gerard Gillen) Irish Musical Studies, vol. 1: Musicology in Ireland (Blackrock County Dublin: Irish Academic Press, 1990), ISBN 0-7165-2456-2.
- Johann Joseph Fux and the Music of the Austro-Italian Baroque (Aldershot: Scolar Press, 1992), ISBN 0-85967-832-6; reprinted (London: Routledge, 2016, ISBN 978-1-138-26049-8; e-book (London: Routledge, 2017, ISBN 978-1-31509-228-7).
- (with Gerard Gillen) Irish Musical Studies, vol. 2: Music and the Church (Blackrock County Dublin: Irish Academic Press, 1993), ISBN 0-7165-2486-4.
- (with Gerard Gillen) Irish Musical Studies, vol. 3: Music and Irish Cultural History (Blackrock County Dublin: Irish Academic Press, 1995), ISBN 0-7165-2536-4.
- (with Patrick F. Devine) Irish Musical Studies, vols 4 & 5: The Maynooth International Musicological Conference 1995: Selected Proceedings; 2 vols (Dublin: Four Courts Press, 1996), ISBN 1-85182-260-7 (vol. 1), ISBN 1-85182-261-5 (vol. 2).
- (with Michael Murphy) Musical Constructions of Nationalism. Essays on the History and Ideology of European Musical Culture, 1800–1945 (Cork: Cork University Press, 2001), ISBN 1-85918-153-8 (hardback), ISBN 1-85918-322-0 (paperback).
- (with Ivano Cavallini) Musicology without Frontiers. Essays in Honour of Stanislav Tuksar (Zagreb: Hrvatsko muzikološko društvo, 2010), ISBN 978-953-6090-44-0.
- (with Vjera Katalinić, Stanislav Tkusar) Musical Theatre as High Culture? The Cultural Discourse on Opera and Operetta in the 19th Century (Zagreb: Hrvatsko muzikološko društvo, 2011), ISBN 978-953-6090-39-6.
- (with Barra Boydell) The Encyclopaedia of Music in Ireland, 2 volumes (Dublin: UCD Press, 2013), ISBN 978-1-906359-78-2.
- (with Kerry Houston) A Musical Offering. Essays in Honour of Gerard Gillen (Dublin: Four Courts Press, 2017), ISBN 978-1-84682-658-0.
- (with Ivano Cavallini, Jolanta Guzy-Pasiak) Music, Migration and European Culture. Essays in Honour of Vjera Katalinic (Zagreb: Hrvatsko muzikolosko drustvo [Croatian Musicological Society], 2020), ISBN 978-953-6090-67-9.

=== Articles ===
(without forewords and book reviews)

- "Erhaltene Quellen der Oratorien von Johann Joseph Fux: Ein Bericht", in: Kirchenmusikalisches Jahrbuch, vol. 67 (1983), pp. 123–131.
- "Canon in the Baroque Era: Some Precedents for the Musical Offering", in: Journal of the Riemenschneider Bach Institute, vol. 15 (1984) no. 4, pp. 4–14.
- "The Need for a Sociology of Irish Folk Music", in: International Review of the Aesthetics and Sociology of Music, vol. 15 (1984) no. 1, pp. 3–13.
- (with Robin Elliott) "A Collection of Oratorio Libretti, 1700–1800, in the Thomas Fisher Rare Book Library, University of Toronto", in: Fontes Artis Musicae, vol. 32 (1985) no. 2, pp. 102–113.
- "The Sanctuary Lamp: An Assessment", in: Irish University Review, vol. 17 (1987), pp. 71–81.
- "Musicology in Ireland", in: Acta musicologica, vol. 60 (1988) no. 3, pp. 290–305.
- "Frank Llewelyn Harrison and the Development of Postwar Musicological Thought", in: Hermathena, vol. 146 (1989), pp. 39–48.
- "Carolan and the Dislocation of Music in Ireland", in: Eighteenth-Century Ireland, vol. 4 (1989), pp. 55–64.
- "The Case for an Encyclopedia of Music in Ireland", in: The Irish Review, vol. 6 (1989), pp. 39–45.
- "The Critical Focus of American Musicology", in: Journal of American Studies, vol. 23 (1989) no. 3, pp. 453–459.
- (with Frank Lawrence) "Heinrich Bewerunge (1862–1923): Ein Beitrag zur Geschichte des Caecilianismus in Irland", in: Kirchenmusikalisches Jahrbuch, vol. 74 (1990), pp. 41–66.
- "A Canadian Model for Music in Ireland", in: Canadian Journal of Irish Studies, vol. 16 (1990), pp. 1–6.
- "Music and the Perception of Music in Ireland", in: Studies, vol. 79 (1990), pp. 38–44.
- "Brian Friel, Thomas Murphy and the Use of Music in Contemporary Irish Drama", in: Modern Drama, vol. 33 (1990) no. 4, pp. 553–562.
- "Musicology, Positivism and the Case for an Encyclopedia of Music in Ireland", in: Musicology in Ireland, ed. Gerald Gillen & Harry White (Blackrock County Dublin, 1990), pp. 295–300.
- "The Holy Commandments of Tonality", in: Journal of Musicology, vol. 9 (1991) no. 2, pp. 254–269.
- "The Sepolcro Oratorios: An Assessment", in: Johann Joseph Fux and the Music of the Austro-Italian Baroque, ed. Harry White (Aldershot, 1992), pp. 164–230.
- "Mozart: The Second Centenary", in: Studies, vol. 80 (1991), pp. 41–47.
- "Church Music and Musicology in Ireland", in: Music and the Church, ed. Gillen & White (Blackrock County Dublin, 1993), pp. 333–338.
- (with Frank Lawrence) "Towards a History of the Cecilian Movement in Ireland", in: Music and the Church, ed. Gillen & White (Blackrock County Dublin, 1993), pp. 78–107.
- "Music and the Irish Literary Imagination", in: Music and Irish Cultural History ed. Gillen & White (Blackrock County Dublin, 1995), pp. 212–228.
- "The Oratorios of Johann Joseph Fux and the Imperial Court in Vienna", in: Studies in Music from the University of Western Ontario, vol. 15 (1995), pp. 1–16.
- "Some Canonic Variations", in: Studies, vol. 85 (1996), pp. 271–277.
- "Maynooth Conference Report", in: Journal of Musicology vol. 14 (1996) no. 4, pp. 579–589.
- "The Conceptual Failure of Music Education in Ireland", The Irish Review, vol. 21 (1997), pp. 44–48.
- "The Preservation of Music and Irish Cultural History", in: International Review of the Aesthetics and Sociology of Music, vol. 27 (1997), no. 2, pp. 123–138.
- "If It's Baroque, Don't Fix It: On the 'Work-Concept' and the Historical Integrity of Musical Composition before 1800", in: Acta musicologica, vol. 69 (1997), no. 1, pp. 94–104.
- "'Something Is Taking Its Course': Dramatic Exactitude and the Paradigm of Serialism in Samuel Beckett", in: Samuel Beckett and Music, ed. Mary Bryden (Oxford, 1998), pp. 159–171.
- "American Musicology and 'The Archives of Eden'", in: Journal of American Studies, vol. 32 (1998), no. 1, pp. 1–18.
- "'A Book of Manners in the Wilderness': The University as Enabler in Music Education", in: College Music Symposium, vol. 38 (1998), pp. 47–63.
- "Strange Intimacies: Music, Politics and the Irish Imagination", in: Music in Ireland, 1798–1998, ed. Richard Pine (Cork, 1998), pp. 29–37.
- "Ballads"; "Belfast Harp Festival"; "Dancing"; "Ethnic Music"; "Music"; "Musical Institutions and Venues, 1700–1990"; "Opera"; "Popular Music", in: The Oxford Companion to Irish History, ed. Seán J. Connolly (Oxford, 1998).
- "Fux, Johann Joseph", in: The Bach Companion, ed. Malcolm Boyd (Oxford, 1999), pp. 184–185.
- "Music: History and Performance", in: The Blackwell Companion to Modern Irish Culture, ed. William J. McCormack (Oxford, 1999), pp. 405–411.
- "Et in Arcadia ego: Fux and the Viennese Sepolcro", in: Atti del antiquae musicae Italicae studiosi, ed. Andrea Luppi (Como, 1999), pp. 213–228.
- "Brian Friel and the Condition of Music", in: Irish University Review, vol. 29 (1999) no. 1, pp. 6–15.
- (with David Fallows, et al.) "Music and Sister Disciplines: Past, Present and Future", in: Current Musicology, vol. 63 (1999), pp. 150–169.
- "Bunting, Edward", in: Die Musik in Geschichte und Gegenwart (MGG), biographical part, vol. 3 (Kassel: Bärenreiter, 2000).
- "Gefühl und Wissen: Axel Klein und die irische Musik", in: Irland Journal, vol. 11 (2000), pp. 25–27.
- "Polite Forms", in: Aloys Fleischmann: A Musician Remembered, ed. Ruth Fleischmann (Cork, 2000), pp. 262–266.
- "Bewerunge, Heinrich"; "Deane, Raymond"; "Fux, Johann Joseph" (with Thomas Hochradner); "Harrison, Francis Llewelyn" (with David Scott); "Ireland (1)"; "Larchet, John Francis"; "Ó Riada, Seán", in: The New Grove Dictionary of Music and Musicians, 2nd edition (London: Macmillan, 2001).
- "Nationalism, Colonialism and the Cultural Stasis of Music in Ireland", in: Musical Constructions of Nationalism, ed. Harry White & Michael Murphy (Cork, 2001), pp. 257–272.
- "Music and Cultural History in Ireland", in: Historični Seminar 1998–2000, ed. Metoda Kokole (Ljubliana, 2001), pp. 187–204.
- "'De stylo ecclesiastico': Sacred Music at the Imperial Court Chapel in Vienna c1700–1730 and the Influence of Northern Italy", in: Barocco Padano: Atti del X convegno internazionale sulla musica sacra nei secoli XVII–XVIII, ed. Alberto Colzani, Andrea Luppi, Maurizio Padoan (Como, 2002), pp. 265–283.
- "Is This Song About You? Some Reflections on Music and Nationalism in Germany and Ireland", in: International Review of the Aesthetics and Sociology of Music vol. 33 (2002) no. 2, pp. 131–147.
- "The Divided Imagination: Music in Ireland after Ó Riada", in: Irish Music in the Twentieth Century, ed. Gareth Cox, Axel Klein (Dublin, 2003), pp. 11–28.
- "'Our Musical State Became Refined': The Musicology of Brian Boydell", in: The Life and Music of Brian Boydell, ed. Gareth Cox, Axel Klein, Michael Taylor (Dublin, 2003), pp. 45–62.
- "'I am the Very Model of a Modern Musicologist': The Savoy Operas and British Cultural History", in: Mladi Zajc/Young Zajc, ed. Vjera Katalinić, Stanislav Tuksar (Rijeka, 2003), pp. 85–93 (in Croatian), pp. 193–201 (in English).
- "The Afterlife of a Tradition: Fux, Vienna and the Classical Style", in: Musical Cultures in the Adriatic Region during the Age of Classicism, ed. Vjera Katalinić, Stanislav Tuksar (Zagreb, 2004), pp. 23–32.
- "Johann Joseph Fux and the Question of Einbau Technique", in: Bach Studies from Dublin, ed. Ann Leahy, Yo Tomita (Dublin, 2004), pp. 29–49.
- "Art Music and the Question of Ethnicity: The Slavic Dimension of Czech Music from an Irish Perspective", in: International Review of the Aesthetics and Sociology of Music vol. 35 (2004) no. 1, pp. 29–46.
- "Aidan Carl Mathews", in: The UCD Aesthetic, ed. Anthony Roche (Dublin, 2005), pp. 239–245.
- "Musicology", in: Nineteenth-Century Ireland: A Guide to Recent Research, ed. Margaret Kelleher, Laurence M. Geary (Dublin, 2005), pp. 165–181.
- "'Paltry, Scented Things from Italy': Ireland and the Discourse of Nationalism in 19th-Century European Musical Culture", in: Musica e storia vol. 12 (2005) no. 3, pp. 649–662.
- "The Sovereign Ghosts of Thomas Moore", in: Print Culture and Intellectual Life in Ireland, 1660–1941 (Essays in Honour of Michael Adams), ed. Martin Fanning, Raymond Gillespie (Dublin, 2006), pp. 164–185.
- "Fux, Johann Joseph", in: The Cambridge Mozart Encyclopaedia, ed. Cliff Eisen, Simon P. Keefe (Cambridge, 2006), pp. 186–187.
- "The Afterlife of a Tradition: European Music and Irish Literature in the Nineteenth Century", in: De musica disserenda vol. 11 (2006) no. 2, pp. 107–119.
- "The Rules of Engagement: Richard Taruskin and the History of Western Music", in: Journal of the Society for Musicology in Ireland vol. 2 (2006–7), pp. 21–49.
- "Cultural Theory, Nostalgia and the Historical Record: Opera in Ireland and the Irishness of Opera during the Nineteenth Century", in: Music in Nineteenth-Century Ireland, ed. Michael Murphy, Jan Smaczny (Dublin, 2007), pp. 15–35.
- "Riverdance: Irish Identity and the Musical Artwork", in: New Hibernia Review vol. 13 (2009) no. 2, p. 63–69.
- "Edward Bunting"; "Turlough Carolan"; "Thomas Moore"; "Seán Ó Riada", in: Dictionary of Irish Biography ed. James Maguire, James Quinn (Cambridge, 2009 and online)
- "The Invention of Ethnicity: Traditional Music and the Modulations of Irish Culture", in: De musica disserenda vol. 14 (2009) no. 2, pp. 85–95.
- "'A Better Form of Drama': Tom Murphy and the Claims of Music", in: 'Alive in Time': The Enduring Drama of Tom Murphy. New Essays, ed. Christopher Murray (Dublin, 2010), pp. 139–154.
- "The Musical Afterlives of Thomas Moore", in: Musicology without Frontiers: Essays in Honour of Stanislav Tuksar, ed. Ivano Cavallini, Harry White (Zagreb, 2010), pp. 175–188.
- "Synge, Music and Edwardian Dublin", in: Synge and Edwardian Ireland, ed. Brian Cliff, Nicholas Grene (Oxford, 2011), pp. 84–101.
- "Wien: Kirchenmusik am kaiserlichen Hof im 17. und 18. Jahrhundert", in: Enzyklopädie der Kirchenmusik, vol. 2: Zentren der Kirchenmusik, ed. Matthias Schneider, Beate Bugenhagen (Laaber: Laaber Verlag, 2011), pp. 287–315.
- "Cultural Theory, Literary Reception and the Question of 'Irishness' in Nineteenth-Century Opera", in: Musical Theatre as High Culture?, ed. Vjera Katalinić (Zagreb, 2012), pp. 9–24.
- "Johann Joseph Fux and the Musical Discourse of Servitude", in: Sakralmusik im Habsburgerreich, ed. Tassilo Erhardt (Vienna, 2013), pp. 11–24.
- "The Invention of Ethnicity. Traditional Music and the Modulations of Irish Culture", in: Music and Identity in Ireland and Beyond, ed. Mark Fitzgerald, John O'Flynn (Farnham: Ashgate, 2014), pp. 273–286.
- "The Invention of Irish Music: Remembering Grattan Flood", in: Franjo Ksavar Kuhač (1834–1911). Musical Historiography and Identity, ed. Vjera Katalinić, Stanislav Tuksar (Zagreb, 2014), pp. 207–215.
- "Johann Joseph Fux and the Imperative of Italy", in: European Musicians in Venice, Rome and Naples (1650–1750), ed. Gesa zur Nieden, Anne Madeleine Goulet (Rome, 2015), pp. 575–586.
- "The Imperium of Music", in: Voices on Joyce, ed. Anne Fogarty, Fran O'Rourke (Dublin, 2015), pp. 107–118.
- "Citation, Narrative and Meaning: Woody Allen and the Late Schubert", in: Schubert's Late Music. History, Theory, Style, ed. Lorraine Byrne Bodley, Julian Horton (Cambridge, 2016), pp. 77–88.
- "The Lyre of Apollo: Thomas Moore and the Irish Harp", in: Harp Studies, ed. Sandra Joyce, Helen Lawlor (Dublin, 2016), pp. 90–104.
- "Courtyards in Delft", in: Ireland and Quebec. Multidisciplinary Perspectives on History, Culture and Society, ed. Margaret Kelleher, Michael Kenneally (Dublin, 2016), pp. 197–210.
- "The English Resistance to Opera", in: Ivan Zajc (1832–1914). Musical Migrations and Cultural Transfers, ed. Stanislav Tuksar (Zagreb, 2016), pp. 175–184.
- "MacPherson, Ossian and the Bardic Ideal", in: De Musica Disserenda, vol. 12 (2016), pp. 109–120.
- "The Lexicography of Irish Musical Experience: Notes Towards a Digital Future", in: Fontes Artis Musicae, vol. 63 (2016), no. 3, pp. 192–201.
- "'Attending His Majesty's State in Ireland': English, German and Italian Musicians in Dublin, 1700–1762", in: Music Migration in the Early Modern Age, ed. Jolanta Guzy-Pasiak, Aneta Markuszewska (Warsaw, 2016), pp. 53–64.
- "Evangelists of the Postmodern: Reconfigurations of Bach since 1985", in: Understanding Bach, vol. 12 (2017), pp. 85–107.
- "The Imagined Unities of Thomas Moore", in: Thomas Moore and Romantic Inspiration, ed. Brian Caraher, Sarah McCleave (London, 2017), pp. 31–42.
- "'A priest of eternal imagination': Joyce, Music and Roman Catholicism", in: A Musical Offering, ed. Kerry Houston, Harry White (Dublin, 2017), pp. 373–386.
- "'Making Symphony articulate': Bernard Shaw's Sense of Music History", in: British Musical Criticism and Intellectual Thought, 1860–1950, ed. Jeremy Dibble, Julian Horton (Woodbridge, 2018), pp. 84–101.
- "'We did not choose this patrimony'": Irish Musical Inheritances since Independence, in: Patrimoine/Cultural Heritage in France and Ireland, ed. Eamon Maher, Eugene O'Brien (Oxford etc., 2019), pp. 57–78.
- "Affordances of the Piano: A Cinematic Representation of the Victorian Salon", in: Musical Salon Culture in the Long Nineteenth Century, ed. Anja Bunzel, Natasha Loges (Woodbridge, 2019), pp. 153–167.
- "Thomas Moore: 'Letter on Music' (1810)", in: Documents of Irish Music History in the Long Nineteenth Century, ed. Kerry Houston, Maria McHale, Michael Murphy (Dublin, 2019), pp. 21–32.
- "'After long silence': Examining Paradigms for an Unwritten History", in: International Review of the Aesthetics and Sociology of Music, vol. 50 (2019) no. 1–2, pp. 47–69.
- "Das Land ohne Musik? Ireland in the European Ear", in: Ireland in the European Eye, ed. Gisela Holfter, Bettina Migge (Dublin, 2019), pp. 350–367.
- "Riverdance", in: Recalling the Celtic Tiger, ed. Eamon Maher, Eugene O'Brien, Brian Lucey (Oxford etc., 2019), pp. 279–81.
- "Tonality, Genre and the Great War: Musical Narrative and the Impact of Modernism", in: The Great War (1914–1918) and Music, ed. Stanislav Tuksar, Monika Jurić Janjik (Zagreb, 2020), pp. 59–70.
- "Alternative Histories (Reflections from a Private Library)", in: Music, Migration and European Culture. Essays in Honour of Vjera Katalinic, ed. Ivano Cavallini, Jolanta Guzy-Pasiak, Harry White (Zagreb, 2020), pp. 411–427.
- "'Les fruits de loisir': Some European Conceptions and Misconceptions of Irish Music", in: Music in Society [Sarajevo], vol. 11 (2020), pp. 63–84.
- "'Monuments of its own magnificence': Musicology within Irish Studies", in: Reimagining Irish Studies for the Twenty-First Century, ed. Eamon Maher, Eugene O'Brien (Oxford etc., 2021), pp. 169–182.
- "'Made in Italy': Johann Joseph Fux and the Formation of a 'Dynastic Style'", in: Between Central Europe and the Mediterranean: Music, Literature and the Performing Arts, ed. Ivana Tomić Ferić, Antonela Marić (Split, 2021), pp. 301–316.
- "25 January 1922: Premiere of Swan Hennessy's Second String Quartet, Paris. Art Music and the Struggle for Independence", in: Ireland 1922. Independence, Partition, Civil War, ed. Darragh Gannon, Fearghal McGarry (Dublin, 2022), pp. 33–39.

=== Poetry ===
- Polite Forms (Dublin: Carysfort Press, 2012), ISBN 978-1-90450-555-6.
- The Kenmare Occurrences (American Fork, UT: Kelsay Books, 2018), ISBN 978-1-94746-572-5.
- The Larkin Hours (American Fork, UT: Kelsay Books, 2024), ISBN 978-1-63980-633-1.

== Bibliography ==
- Robin Elliott: "White, Harry", in: The Encyclopaedia of Music in Ireland, ed. Harry White, Barra Boydell (Dublin: UCD Press, 2013), pp. 1055–1057.
- Lorraine Byrne Bodley (ed.): Music Preferred. Essays in Musicology, Cultural History and Analysis in Honour of Harry White (Vienna: Hollitzer Verlag, 2018), 774 pages, ISBN 978-3-99012-401-7.
