= Aidan Mathews =

Irish writer

Aidan Mathews, sometimes Aidan Carl Mathews, (born 1956) is an Irish poet and dramatist born in Dublin.

== Life ==
He was educated at Gonzaga College, Dublin and University College Dublin and holds an MA from Trinity College Dublin. He works as a drama producer in RTÉ Radio. Mathews has taught English at St. Louis High School, Rathmines and at Belvedere College, Dublin. His poetry and short stories have been included in many anthologies. He lives in County Dublin and is married with two daughters, Lucy and Laura.

Mathews won the Irish Times Award in 1974; The Patrick Kavanagh Poetry Award in 1976; the Macauley Fellowship (awarded by the Arts Council (Ireland)) in 1978–9; the Ina Coolbrith Poetry Prize in 1981; and an Academy of American Poets Award in 1982.

== Publications ==
=== Poetry books ===
- Windfalls (The Dolmen Press, 1977)
- Minding Ruth (The Gallery Press, 1983)
- According to the Small Hours (Jonathan Cape, 1998)

=== Plays ===
- The Antigone (Project Arts Centre, Dublin) (1984)
- The Diamond Body (Project Arts Centre, Dubin)(1984)
- Entrance, Exit (The Peacock Theatre, Dublin)
- Communion (The Peacock Theatre 2003)

=== Short fiction ===
- Adventures in a Bathyscope (Secker & Warburg, 1988)
- Lipstick on the Host (Secker & Warburg, 1992)

=== Novel ===
- Muesli at Midnight (Secker & Warburg, 1990)

=== Editor ===
- Editor of Immediate Man: Cuimhni ar Chearbhall Ó Dalaigh. A Tribute to Ireland's Former President ( Colin Smythe, 1983).

== Bibliography ==
- Harry White: "Aidan Carl Mathews", in: The UCD Aesthetic, ed. Anthony Roche (Dublin, 2005), pp. 239–245.
