= Gerard Gillen =

Irish organist and musicologist

Gerard Thomas Gillen (born 16 August 1942) is one of the most prominent Irish organists and a Professor Emeritus in Music at Maynooth University. As an organist, he has performed globally and recorded several CDs. Gillen's research interests lie in the areas of Catholic church music, organ building, and performance practice.

== Education ==
Gillen was born in Dublin and came in contact with organ playing through John Clery, organist of the Franciscan Church of the Immaculate Conception on Merchant's Quay, Dublin. He studied piano at the Municipal School of Music, Dublin, with Elizabeth Costello and organ with William Sydney Greig. Having won an entrance scholarship, Gillen graduated with first-class honours from University College Dublin (UCD). With a travelling scholarship from the Arts Council of Ireland he was able to pursue further organ studies at Antwerp, Belgium, with Flor Peeters, a time during which he met Marcel Dupré, Maurice Duruflé and Olivier Messiaen. He returned in 1966 for postgraduate studies at the Royal Conservatoire Antwerp, gaining a "Prix d'Excellence".

He subsequently went to Queen's College, Oxford for postgraduate research studies, where he also graduated BLitt with research on 17th-century keyboard music.

In 1992, the University of Oxford elected Gillen a John Betts Fellow.

== Appointments ==
On his return to Ireland in 1969, Gillen was appointed lecturer in music at UCD. He moved on to St Patrick's College, Maynooth (now Maynooth University) in 1985, occupying the Chair of Music until his retirement in April 2007. He oversaw the expansion of the music department in undergraduate and postgraduate programmes, also teaching performance studies and musicology, including new diplomas in Music Technology and Church Music. He also directed the university's choral society. He oversaw the development of the department from one of the smallest in Ireland to one of the largest in the British Isles. He remains Professor Emeritus there.

From 1976 to 2018, Gillen was the Titular Organist of St. Mary's Pro-Cathedral, Dublin, retiring after 42 years of service.

Since 1993 he has been chair of the Irish Episcopal Commission's Advisory Committee on Church Music.

As a musicologist, Gillen is general editor (with Harry White of UCD) of the book series Irish Musical Studies.

Gillen's organ pupils include Gerald Barry, John O'Keeffe, Shane Brennan, Peter Sweeney, Andrew Synnott, and others.

== Academic honours ==
In the course of his long career, Gillen has received numerous awards and honorary titles including

- Austrian Decoration for Science and Art,
- Officer in the Order of the Crown (Belgium),
- Chevalier of the Ordre des Arts et des Lettres (France),
- Fellow of the Royal Irish Academy of Music,
- Honorary doctorate from the Pontifical University of Maynooth,
- Knight Commander of the Order of St Gregory (Vatican).

== Performances ==
Gillen enjoys an international reputation as an organ recitalist and has given recitals at prestigious international venues including the Royal Festival Hall, London; McEwan Hall, Edinburgh; Ulster Hall, Belfast; the cathedrals of Pittsburgh, Salt Lake City, San Francisco, Canterbury, Notre Dame (Paris), St Stephen's (Vienna), Salzburg, Regensburg, Freiburg, Hamburg, Lübeck, St Bavo, Haarlem, Brussels, Antwerp, Bruges, Ghent, Copenhagen, Madrid, and Tallinn.

Gillen was founder-chairman of the Dublin International Organ and Choral Festival and was the festival's artistic director from 1990 to 2000. He was also consultant to the National Concert Hall in Dublin on the installation of the hall's Kenneth Jones concert organ in 1991 and remains one of the hall's honorary organ curators.

Gillen was one of the organists at the Statio Orbis mass of the 50th International Eucharistic Congress held in Croke Park, Dublin on 17 June 2012.

Gillen was the organist on the World Meeting of Families 2018's official hymn, "A Joy For All The Earth", written by Irish composer Ephrem Feeley and recorded in Blackrock College Chapel.

=== Broadcast recordings and discography ===
Gillen has had many recitals recorded and broadcast by various national radio networks: RTÉ, BBC, RTF (France), BRT (Belgium), Norddeutscher Rundfunk, Mitteldeutscher Rundfunk, RAI, Estonian National Radio, and American Public Service Radio.

Gillen plays the 1869 Walker organ of St Audoen's, Dublin (LP NIR, 1971). He also played Buxtehude and Walther on the Chapel Organ of Trinity College, Dublin (LP NIR, 1972). He has made many other recordings including

- Bach at Bray, Audio Tape, KLJ (1976)
- Bach's Toccata in C, BWV 564, KLJ (1978)
- Messe pour les Couvents on the Rieger organ of St Michael's Dun Laoghaire, SDG (1990)
- Baroque Highlights: Gerard Gillen at the organ of St Michael's Church, Dun Laoghaire, SDG (1994)
- Best Loved Sacred Music: St. James's Choir with Niamh Murray (soprano), Gerard Gillen (organ) and Fr. John O'Brien (conductor) (1997)
- Franck and Guilmant: Gerard Gillen Plays the Great Organ of St Mary's Pro-Cathedral, Dublin, SDG 110 (2002)

== Selected publications ==
=== Books ===
- Gerard Gillen (with Harry White), ed. Irish Musical Studies 1: Musicology in Ireland (1990)
- Gerard Gillen (with Harry White), ed. Irish Musical Studies 2: Music and the Church (1992)
- Gerard Gillen (with Harry White), ed. Irish Musical Studies 3: Music and Irish Cultural History (1995)
- Gerard Gillen (with Andrew Johnstone), ed. Irish Musical Studies 6: A Historical Anthology of Irish Church Music (2001)

=== Articles ===
- "The Training of Organists and Choirmasters", in: The Furrow (Music Supplement) (1969).
- "The Organ Music of Franz Liszt", in: The Musical Times vol. 113 (1972), pp. 182–183.
- "New Organ Music", in: The Musical Times vol. 113 (1972), p. 711.
- "Hassler and Contemporaries", in: The Musical Times vol. 113 (1972), pp. 1017–1018.
- "New Organ Music", in: The Musical Times vol. 115 (1974), pp. 981–982.
- "17th-Century Organ Music: New Editions", in: The Musical Times vol. 116 (1975), pp. 172–173.
- "The Rieger Organ in St. Michael's Church, Dún Laoghaire", in: Music and Liturgy, vol. 1 (1975) no. 2, pp. 98–100.
- "Church Music in Dublin, 1590–1900", in: Four Centuries of Music in Ireland, ed. Brian Boydell (London: BBC, 1979), pp. 23–28.
- "The Organ in Bray, Co. Wicklow: An Organist's Evaluation", in: Journal of the British Institute of Organ Studies, volume 5 (1981), pp. 121–126.
- "William Telford and the Victorian Organ in Ireland", in: Irish Musical Studies 2: Music and the Church (1992), pp. 108–129.
- "Looking Back, Looking Forward", in: New Liturgy (Summer 1998), pp. 5–11.
- "Seóirse Bodley", "Brian Boydell", "Jerome de Bromhead", "John Buckley", "Edward Bunting", "George Petrie", "Roman Catholic Church Music", in: The Blackwell Companion to Modern Irish Culture, ed. William J. McCormack (Oxford: Blackwell, 1999).
- "Irish Catholics and Hymns", in: The Furrow (October 2000), pp. 548–556.
- "Towards a Definition of 'Good' Liturgical Music", in: Anail Dé: The Breath of God. Music, Ritual and Spirituality, ed. Helen Phelan (Veritas: Dublin, 2001), pp. 189–200.
- "Children in Irish Liturgical Life", in: New Liturgy (Spring 2005), pp. 11–17.
- "The Pipe Organ: A Centuries-old Heritage", in: New Liturgy (Summer 2006), pp. 15–16.
- "An Instrument for Harmony: How Should We Think About Church Music?", in: Religious Life Review (March/April 2006), pp. 116–123.
- "Contemporary Organ Building in Ireland", in: The Organ. An Encyclopaedia, eds. D Bush & R. Kassel (New York: Routledge, 2006) pp. 271–273.
- "Priests and Music Ministry", in: The Furrow vol. 61 (2010) no. 10, p. 535.
- "The Organ: A Liturgical Force of Considerable Significance", in: Serving Liturgical Renewal. Pastoral and Theological Questions, ed. Liam Tracey, Thomas Whelan (Dublin, 2015), pp. 30–39.

== Bibliography ==
- Kerry Houston, Harry White (eds): A Musical Offering. Essays in Honour of Gerard Gillen (Dublin: Four Courts Press, 2018), 400 pages, ISBN 978-1-84682-658-0.
