= Behan =

Behan (/ˈbiːən/ BEE-ən; Irish: Ó Beacháin) is a surname of Irish origin. It is the Anglicized form of Gaelic Ó Beachain ‘descendant of Beachain.’ A personal name from a diminutive of 'beach' Gaelic, meaning 'bee' in English. The name may refer to:

- Billy Behan (1911–1991), Irish footballer
- Brian Behan (1926–2002), Irish writer, brother of Brendan and Dominic Behan
- Brendan Behan (1923–1964), Irish writer, brother of Brian and Dominic Behan
- Charlie Behan (actor) (born 2004), British actor and DJ
- Denis Behan (born 1984), Irish footballer
- Dominic Behan (1928–1989), Irish writer, brother of Brendan and Brian Behan
- Helen Behan, Irish actress
- Janet Behan (born 1954), English writer, daughter of Brian Behan
- Joe Behan (born 1959), Irish politician
- John Behan (sculptor) (born 1938)
- John Clifford Valentine Behan (1881–1957), Australian academic
- Johnny Behan (1844–1912), American sheriff
- Kate Walker Behan (1851–1918), American club leader and philanthropist; wife of William J. Behan
- Margaret Behan (born 1948), Cheyenne elder
- Nicky Behan (born 1946), Irish Gaelic footballer and hurler
- Paudge Behan (born 1965), Irish actor, son of Brendan Behan's widow
- Petie Behan (1887–1957), American baseball player
- Simon Behan (died 2009), Irish Gaelic footballer
- Stephen Behan, father of Brendan, Brian and Dominic Behan
- William J. Behan (1840–1928), American politician

== See also ==
- Beahan
