= Kathleen Behan =

Irish folk singer

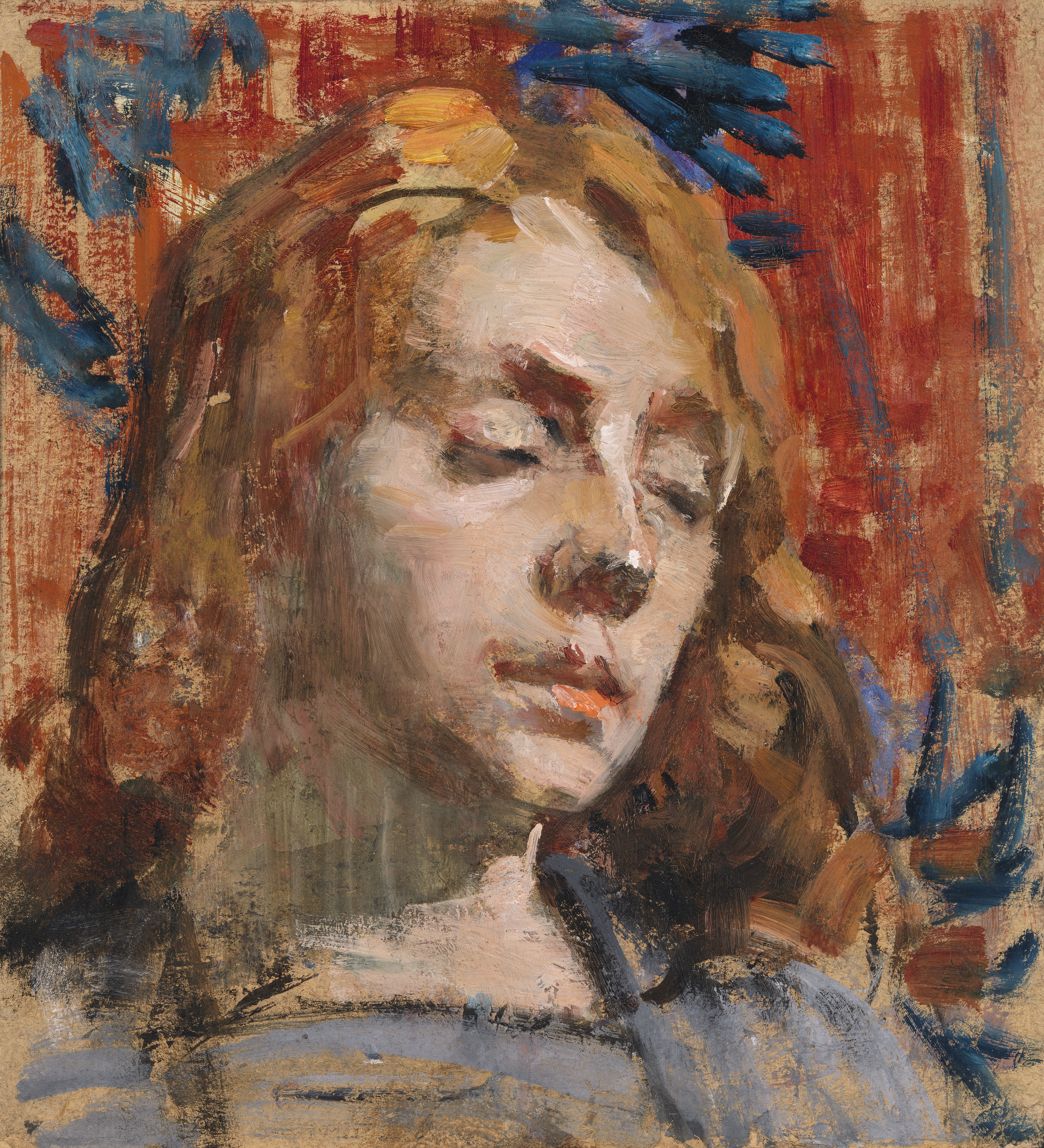
- Portrait of Kathleen Behan by the artist Sarah Purser
- Born: Kathleen Kearney; 18/19 September 1889; 49 Capel Street, Dublin, Ireland
- Died: 26 April 1984 (aged 94); Raheny, Dublin, Ireland
- Spouses: Jack Furlong (m. 1916; died 1918) Stephen Behan (m. 1922; died 1967)
- Children: Roger Casement Furlong; Sean Furlong; Brendan Behan; Seamus Behan; Brian Behan; Dominic Behan; Carmel Behan
- Relatives: Peadar Kearney (brother)

Kathleen Behan (née Kearney; 18/19 September 1889 – 26 April 1984) was an Irish republican and folk singer, and mother of Irish authors Brendan, Brian and Dominic.

== Early life ==
Kathleen Behan was born Kathleen Kearney on either the 18 or 19 September 1889 at 49 Capel Street, Dublin. She was the fifth child and youngest daughter of pork butcher and grocer, John Kearney (1854–1897), and his wife Kathleen Kearney (née McGuinness) (1860–1907). She had four brothers and two sisters. John was from Rosybrook, County Louth and Kathleen from Rathmaiden, Slane, County Meath, and both came from prosperous farming families. Her father had a business on Lower Dorset Street, with a grocery, pub and a row of houses. Owing to his own poor management, by the time Behan was born he had a smaller business on Dolphin's Barn Lane. Following his death in 1897, Behan and her sisters were placed in the Goldenbridge orphanage, Inchicore by their mother. She was there from 1898 to 1904 where she became an avid reader. When she left, she rejoined her family in a one-room tenement flat on Gloucester Street.

== Republican activity and family ==
Her oldest sibling, Peadar Kearney, was an ardent republican who wrote the lyrics to the song that would become the Irish national anthem, "The soldier's song". It was through him that Behan met a printer's compositor and member of the Irish Volunteers, Jack Furlong. They married in 1916. Behan was an active member of Cumann na mBan, and served as a courier to the General Post Office, Dublin and other outposts during the Easter Rising 1916. At the same time, Furlong fought in the Jacob's factory garrison. The couple had two sons: Roger Casement (‘Rory’) Furlong (1917–1987) and Sean Furlong (born March 1919). Sean was born six month's after Behan was widowed when Furlong died in the Spanish flu epidemic of 1918. She lived with her mother-in-law, who was also a republican and seamstress who made Irish Volunteer uniforms. She was arrested for running an IRA safe house. She worked for a short time for Maud Gonne as a housekeeper, where she met W. B. Yeats and Sarah Purser. A study painted of Behan by Purser is now in the National Gallery of Ireland entitled The sad girl. From 1918 to 1922 she worked as a clerk in the Dublin Corporation, whilst also a caretaker in the Harcourt Street branch of the White Cross republican aid association.

In 1922 she married Stephen Behan, house painter, trade unionist and fellow republican. The couple had four sons and one daughter: Brendan (b. 1923), Seamus (b. 1925), Brian (b. 1926), Dominic (b. 1928), and Carmel (b. 1932). Brendan was born while his father was imprisoned during the Irish Civil War, and Behan claimed that Michael Collins gave her money while she was pregnant. Stephen's mother owned three slum tenements, so the Behans lived rent-free in a one-room basement flat at 14 Russell Street. Owing to her disdain at gossiping on the house steps, she was nicknamed "Lady Behan" by her neighbours. When Stephen's mother died in 1936, the Behans moved to a newly built council house in Crumlin, living at 70 Kildare Road. The family found the new house far from work and school, and the local area devoid of community. The family experienced extreme poverty frequently, owing to Stephen's unemployment and during the 9 month long building strike of 1936. Behan attempted to claim a pension as her first husband had served in 1916, but her application was rejected. She had said the exposure to flour had effected Furlong's lungs negatively. It was declined as she had remarried before the enactment of the Army Pensions Act 1923. Despite their circumstances, the house attracted conversation, music, books and politics. The Behan's republican, socialist, labour activist and anti-clericalism had a strong effect on their sons, particularly Brendan and Dominic. Such was the volume of radical meetings that took place at the Behan home, it was dubbed "the Kremlin" by their neighbours, and a "madhouse" by Stephen. During The Emergency of 1939 to 1945 she fought against local shopkeepers who ignored price controls, and was labelled as "red" for her anti-Franco and pro-Stalin sympathies. Her reply to the branding of her as such was "I’m not red, I’m scarlet."

== Later life ==
From the 1950s onwards, Behan shared international fame with her sons Dominic and Brendan. She often travelled to London to see their plays, eventually appearing on British and Irish television and cultivating her own following. She was badly injured when she was struck by a motorcycle, a day before Stephen's death in 1967. Owing to the effect of these injuries, she moved in 1970 to the Sacred Heart Residence of the Little Sisters of the Poor, Sybil Hill, Raheny. In 1981, she recorded an album When all the world was young. Behan died in the nursing home in Raheny on 26 April 1984, and is buried in Deans Grange Cemetery. Taped conversations of her reminiscences were made into an autobiographic book by her son Brian, Mother of all the Behans in 1984. A one-woman stage adaptation of the book by Peter Sheridan and starring Rosaleen Linehan (later runs starred Imelda May) was acclaimed in Ireland, Britain and North America.
