= Hollesley Bay =

Hollesley Bay may refer to:

- Hollesley Bay (HM Prison), near Woodbridge, Suffolk
- HMS Hollesley Bay (K614) a Bay-class anti-aircraft frigate of the British Royal Navy
- Hollesley Bay, Suffolk, part of the coast of Suffolk near the village of Hollesley
