= Lee Ingleby =

English actor (born 1976)

- Born: Lee David Ingleby; 28 January 1976 (age 50); Burnley, Lancashire, England
- Education: London Academy of Music and Dramatic Art
- Occupation: Actor
- Years active: 1997–present

Lee David Ingleby (born 28 January 1976) is an English actor who first gained attention with his leading role in the BBC Two miniseries Nature Boy (2000). His other notable roles include Detective Insp. John Bacchus on the BBC's Inspector George Gently (2007–2017), Paul Hughes in The A Word (2016–2020), Det. Tony Myerscough on Netflix's Criminal: UK (2019–2020), and DCS Jim Hobson in ITV's The Long Shadow (2023). Ingleby was the voice of Bob the Builder in the show of the same name from 2015 to 2018. His film credits include Ever After (1998), Master and Commander: The Far Side of the World (2003), and Harry Potter and the Prisoner of Azkaban (2004).

== Early life ==
Ingleby was born in Burnley, Lancashire, son of Gordon Ingleby and Susan M Hoggarth, and lived in nearby Brierfield during the early part of his life, attending Edge End High School, as did fellow actor John Simm. Both were taught by the same drama teacher, Brian Wellock, who encouraged them to enter professional theatre. He then studied at Accrington and Rossendale College under the tutelage of Martin Cosgrif before progressing to LAMDA in London.

== Career ==
Ingleby's first major role was as the young lead in the 2000 BBC miniseries Nature Boy alongside Paul McGann. He played Smike in the 2001 television film version of The Life and Adventures of Nicholas Nickleby. Also in 2001, he starred in and wrote the screenplay for the short film Cracks in the Ceiling, which he appeared in with his father, Gordon Ingleby. In the 2002 theatrical release Borstal Boy, based very loosely on the life of Irish poet-activist Brendan Behan, Ingleby played a bully in an English boarding school for juvenile offenders.

Ingleby has also made one-off appearances in television programmes such as Hustle, Clocking Off, No Angels, Fat Friends, Jonathan Creek, Spaced, Dalziel and Pascoe, Cadfael (Pilgrim of Hate), and The Bill. He has had supporting roles in films such as Gustave in Ever After alongside Drew Barrymore and as Hollom in the 2003 Peter Weir film Master and Commander: The Far Side of the World.

In 2004, Ingleby had a small role in the Orlando Bloom vehicle Haven, which premiered at the Toronto Film Festival but was not commercially released until 2006 following heavy re-editing. He also guest-starred in the Doctor Who audio adventure Terror Firma.

In 2006 Ingleby appeared in Jimmy McGovern BBC TV series The Street, where he played abusive husband Sean O'Neill alongside Christine Bottomley. Another project during 2006 was the television adaptation of The Wind in the Willows, in which he played Mole. It also starred Bob Hoskins as Badger, Matt Lucas as Toad and Mark Gatiss as Ratty. He also appeared in a modernised BBC adaptation of Rapunzel for the Fairy Tales series. Ingleby also played the important role of Vic Tyler, the father of John Simm's character Sam Tyler, in an episode of Life on Mars.

In 2007 Ingleby was cast as DS John Bacchus (later promoted to inspector in series 7, 2015) in the BBC police drama Inspector George Gently.

Ingleby headed the cast of the 2008 three-part television crime drama A Place of Execution as DI George Bennett as he was in the 1960s determined to close the case of a missing girl. When not working in films and television, Ingleby remains active on the stage, where his credits include Puck in Midsummer Night's Dream, Alexander in Nicholas Wright's Cressida and Katurian in Martin McDonagh's The Pillowman. He performed in the play Our Class by Tadeusz Slobodzianek at the Cottesloe Theatre from September 2009 to January 2010 as Zygmunt.

In 2011 Ingleby appeared in the television series Being Human as Edgar Wyndham, a menacing vampire elder, and also in Luther as serial killer Cameron Pell.

In 2013 Ingleby took on the voice role of Phillip De Nicholay, the Sheriff of Nottingham, in a new audio production of the Robin Hood legend, produced by Spiteful Puppet. He returned to the role in the follow-up HOOD – The Scribe of Sherwood. In the same year two more feature length audio stories (Warriors' Harvest and King's Command) were produced by Spiteful Puppet with Ingleby once again playing the role of De Nicholay.

In 2015 Ingleby first played Bob in the UK version of the new computer-generated series Bob the Builder - a role that continued until 2018. That same year he provided spoken word narration on the progressive rock album Please Come Home, which the British musician John Mitchell released under the project name Lonely Robot.

From 2016 Ingleby appeared in the role of Paul Hughes, father of autistic child Joe, in the BBC drama series The A Word, which ran until 2020.

== Filmography ==
=== Film ===
Year	Title	Role	Notes
1998	Ever After	Gustave	
2000	Borstal Boy	Dale	
2001	Cracks in the Ceiling	Lad	Short film. Also wrote the screenplay
2003	Master and Commander: The Far Side of the World	Midshipman Hollom	
2004	Harry Potter and The Prisoner of Azkaban	Stan Shunpike	
2004	Haven	Patrick	
2005	A Matter of Conscience	Mr. Johnstone	Short film
2005	The Headsman	Bernhard	
2006	The Wind in the Willows	Mole	
2007	The Last Legion	Germanus	
2009	Doghouse	Matt	
2009	Post-It Love	Guy	Short films
2009	Furnace Four	Porter	Short films
2009	Wintering	Paul	Short films
2011	All the Way Up	Bell Boy	Short films
2012	A Running Jump	Gary	Short films
2012	Best Laid Plans	Deano	
2013	The Arbiter	John	
2013	Communion	Father Samuel	
2013	Wisdom	Denton Elicient	Short film
2014	Mr. Turner	One of Unhappy Couple	
2015	Last Knights	Messenger	
2017	Bob the Builder: Mega Machines	Bob (voice)	UK version
2022	The Lost King	Richard Taylor	
2024	Victory to the Mimers	Arthur Peters	Short film

=== Television ===
Year	Title	Role	Notes
1997	Soldier Soldier	Kevin Fitzpatrick	Series 7; 8 episodes
1998	Killer Net	Gordon	Mini-series; episodes 1–3
1998	In the Red	Paul, Reform Party Worker	Mini-series; episodes 1–3
1998	The Bill	Ian	Series 14; episode 119: "Puzzled"
1998	Cadfael	Walter	Series 4; episode 3: "The Pilgrim of Hate"
1999	Wing and a Prayer	Gary Spalling	Series 2; episodes 1 & 2
1999	The Dark Room	Bobby Franklyn	Episode 1
1999	Dalziel and Pascoe	Kieron Cumming	Series 4; episode 4: "The British Grenadier"
1999	Junk	Rob	Television film
2000	Jonathan Creek	Derek Spratley	Series 3; episode 6: "The Three Gamblers"
2000	Nature Boy	David Witton	Mini-series; episodes 1–4
2001	Spaced	Teenage Thug Leader	Series 2; episode 5: "Gone"
2001	The Life and Adventures of Nicholas Nickleby	Smike	Television film
2002	Clocking Off	Stephen Dugdale	Series 3; episode 7: "Gary's Story"
2002	Fat Friends	Craig Porter	Series 2; episode 5: "Sticky Fingers"
2002	Impact	Peter Stamford	Television film
2004	No Angels	Nurse Carl Jenkins	Series 1; episode 2
2004	Blue Murder	Roger Boersma	Series 2; episode 2: "Up in Smoke"
2004	Early Doors	Dean	Series 2; episodes 1, 3, 4 & 6
2005	Hustle	Trevor Speed	Series 2; episode 3: "The Lesson"
2005	Coming Up	Gabriel	Series 3; episode 5: "Karma Cowboys"
2006	Life on Mars	Vic Tyler	Series 1; episode 8
2006	The Street	Sean O'Neill	Series 1; episodes 1–6
2006	Brief Encounters	Stephen	Mini-series; episode 9: "One Night in White Satin"
2006	The Wind in the Willows	Mole	Television film
2007	Agatha Christie's Marple	DC Colin Hards	Series 3; episode 4: "Nemesis"
2007	The Worst Journey in the World	Henry 'Birdie' Bowers	Television film
2007–2017	Inspector George Gently	DS/DI John Bacchus	Series 1–8; 25 episodes
2008	Fairy Tales	Jimmy Stojkovic	Mini-series; episode 1: "Rapunzel"
2008	Place of Execution	DI George Bennett	Mini-series; episodes 1–3
2008	Crooked House	Ben	Mini-series; episodes 1–4
2009	10 Minute Tales	Man	Episode 8: "Through the Window"
2010	The First Men in the Moon	Chessocks	Television film
2011	Being Human	Edgar Wyndham	Series 3; episode 8: "The Wolf-Shaped Bullet"
2011	Luther	Cameron Pell	Series 2; episodes 1 & 2
2011	CBeebies Bedtime Story	Himself - Storyteller	5 episodes
2012	White Heat	Alan	Mini-series; episodes 1–6
2012	Sinbad	Riff	Episode 9: "Eye of the Tiger"
2013	Moving On	Paul	Series 5; episode 2: "The House"
2014	Quirke	Leslie White	Mini-series; episode 2: "The Silver Swan"
2014	The Crimson Field	Pte. Wilfred 'Dad' Tyrell	Episode 4
2014	Our Zoo	George Mottershead	Main cast; mini-series; episodes 1–6
2015–2018	Bob the Builder	Bob (UK) / Bob's Dad (voice)	Main role, succeeding Neil Morrissey. Series 1–3; 125 episodes
2016	The Five	Slade	Mini-series; episodes 1–10
2016–2020	The A Word	Paul Hughes	Main cast; series 1–3; 18 episodes
2017	Line of Duty	Nick Huntley	Series 4; episodes 1–6
2017	Warship	Himself - Narrator	Episodes 1–3
2018	Innocent	David Collins	Series 1; episodes 1–4
2018	Watership Down	Captain Campion (voice)	Mini-series; episodes 1–4
2018–2025	Pilgrimage	Himself - Narrator	Series 1–7; 21 episodes
2019–2020	Criminal: UK	DI Tony Myerscough	Series 1; episodes 1–3, & series 2; episodes 1–4
2022	Crossfire	Jason Cross	Mini-series; episodes 1–3
2022	The Serpent Queen	Henri II (older)	Series 1; episodes 4–7
2023	The Hunt for Raoul Moat	DCS Neil Adamson	Main role; mini-series; episodes 1–3
2023	Screw	Patrick Morgan	Series 2; episodes 1–6
2023	The Long Shadow	DCS Jim Hobson	Mini-series; episodes 1–7
2024	The Cuckoo	Nick Haynes	Main role; mini-series; episodes 1–4
2025	The Hack	David Leigh	Mini-series

=== Radio ===
- Cry Hungary (as Peter Kovacs), BBC Radio 4, 2006
- Radio Head, Up and Down the Dial of British Radio by John Osborne, Book of the Week, BBC Radio 4, 2009
- A Kind of Loving (as Vic Brown), BBC Radio 4, 2010
- Boots on the Ground (as Marks), BBC Radio 4, 2013
- Hood: Noble Secrets (as Phillip De Nicholay – Sheriff of Nottingham), Spiteful Puppet, 2013
- House of Ghosts: A Case for Inspector Morse (as Inspector Lewis), BBC Radio 4, 2017
- Morse: In The Shallows (as Inspector Lewis), BBC Radio 4, BBC Radio Programmes, 2018
