= Borstal Boy (film) =

- Theatrical release poster
- Directed by: Peter Sheridan
- Screenplay by: Peter Sheridan; Nye Heron
- Based on: Borstal Boy by Brendan Behan
- Produced by: Jim Sheridan; Pat Moylan
- Starring: Shawn Hatosy; Danny Dyer; Lee Ingleby; Michael York
- Cinematography: Ciarán Tanham
- Edited by: Stephen O'Connell
- Music by: Stephen McKeon
- Distributed by: Strand Releasing
- Release date: 1 March 2000
- Running time: 93 minutes
- Countries: United Kingdom; Ireland
- Language: English
- Budget: $100,000
- Box office: $87,400

Borstal Boy is a 2000 romantic drama film directed by Peter Sheridan, based on the 1958 autobiographical novel of the same name by Irish writer Brendan Behan.

== Plot ==
In 1941, 16-year-old IRA volunteer Brendan Behan is going on a bombing mission from Republic of Ireland to Liverpool during the Second World War. His mission is thwarted when he is apprehended, charged and imprisoned in a borstal, a reform institution for young offenders in East Anglia, England. At borstal, Brendan is forced to live face-to-face with those he regarded as his enemies, a confrontation that reveals a deep inner conflict in the young Brendan and forces a self-examination that is both traumatic and revealing. Events take an unexpected turn and Brendan is thrown into a complete spin. In the emotional vortex, he finally faces up to the truth.

== Cast ==
- Shawn Hatosy as Brendan Behan
- Danny Dyer as Charlie Millwall
- Lee Ingleby as Dale
- Michael York as Joyce
- Eva Birthistle as Liz Joyce
- Mark Huberman as Mac
- Ian McElhinney as Verreker
- Ronnie Drew as Customs

== Adaptation ==
The director, Sheridan, said "there was a very specific aspect of Behan's story I was interested in -- his Republicanism contrasted with his sexuality" and that he "took huge liberties in order to make the film I wanted to make". It depicts Behan as attracted to his male best friend as well as the warden's daughter. Much of the film's narrative is very different from the novel, including adding the romances, an escape attempt, and a student play.

== Reception ==
Roger Ebert gave Borstal Boys two out of four stars, lacking the "gusto and rudeness" of the source material. He found the depictions of the borstal softened and unrealistic. Film critic Stephen Holden described the film as "a likable rites-of-passage memory piece doused in period nostalgia". Reviewer Scott Tobias, writing for the A.V. Club, also noted the nostalgic softening of Behan's story, including that the film "disingenuously suggests that the borstal years cured Behan of his aggression, when in reality, he shot a police officer shortly after returning to Dublin." A reviewer for The Advocate described the film as entertaining and manipulative.

== See also ==
- List of feature films with bisexual characters
