= Beahan =

Beahan is a surname, and may refer to:

- Brianna Beahan (born 1991), Australian track and field athlete
- Daniel Beahan (born 1984), Australian boxer
- Kate Beahan (born 1974), Australian film actress
- Kermit Beahan (1918–1989), bombardier on the American B-29 Superfortress Bockscar
- Kevin Beahan (1933–2022), Irish Gaelic footballer
- Michael Beahan (1937–2022), 19th President of the Australian Senate
- Virginia Beahan (born 1946), American photographer

== See also ==
- Behan
