= Janet Behan =

English-Irish writer and actress

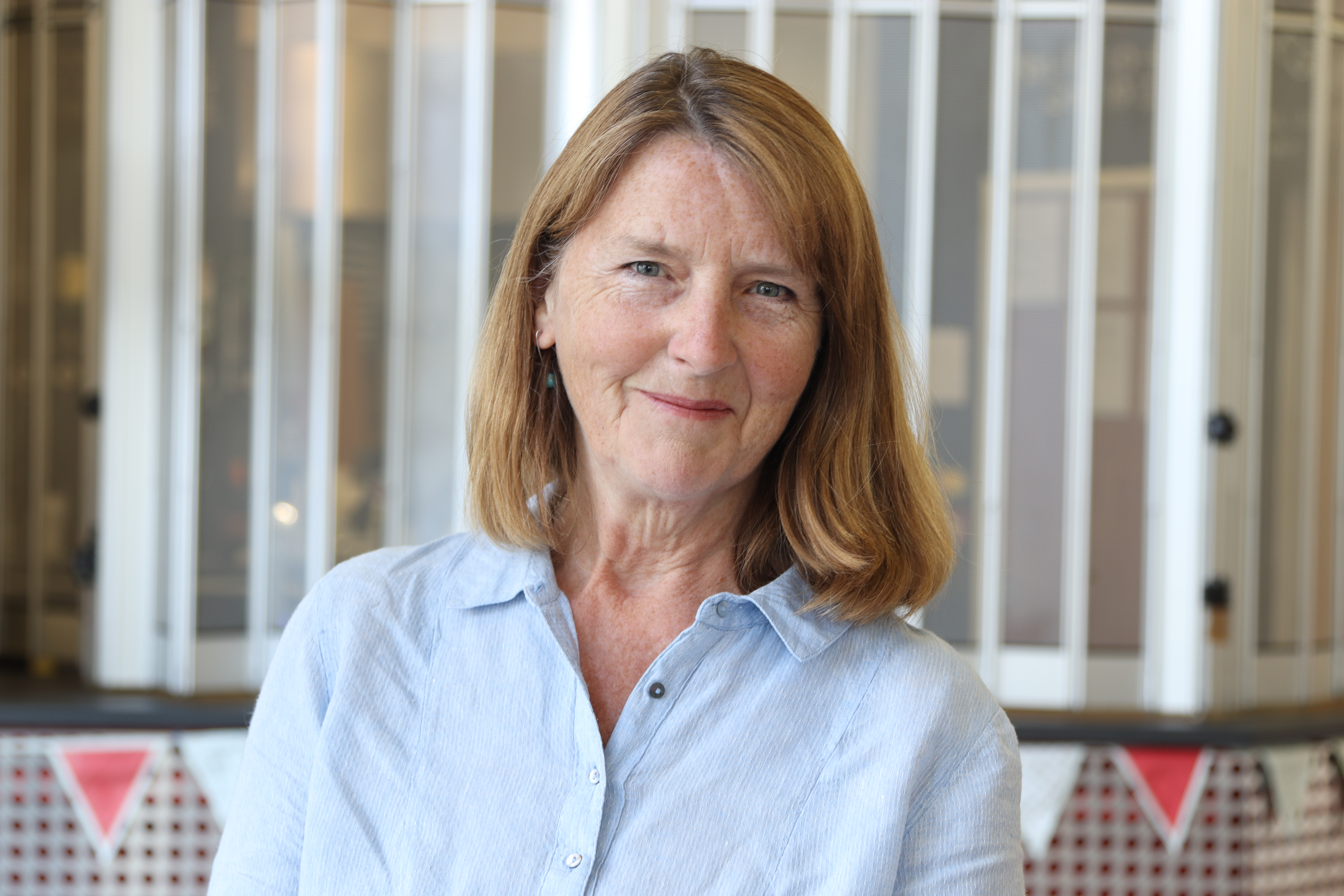
- Born: 22 July 1954 (age 72); London, England
- Occupation: Actress
- Relatives: Brian Behan (father)

Janet Behan (22 July 1954) is an English-Irish writer and actress.

== Biography ==
Behan was born in London, the daughter of an Irish father Brian Behan and an English mother Celia Behan. Her father was a playwright, the great-nephew of the songwriter Peadar Kearney (author of Amhrán na bhFiann, the Irish national anthem), and brother of the writers Brendan Behan and Dominic Behan. Her husband is the television director Dermot Boyd. Her siblings include journalist Rosemary Behan, writer and musician Ruth Behan, and poet Daniel Tobias Behan.

Behan trained first as an actress at the Central School of Speech and Drama, and appeared in numerous plays and on television, including a role in Eastenders and productions at the National Theatre.

In 2011, her play Brendan At The Chelsea was produced at the Lyric Theatre, Belfast, with Adrian Dunbar starring. The production went on to tour New York and Dublin, to critical acclaim.

The play was published by Edinburgh University Press in 2014, and Behan appeared in an RTE television documentary 'Brendan Behan - The Roaring Boy', alongside Adrian Dunbar.

In 2016, Behan premiered her new one-woman play 'Realtine / Noreen' at the Camden Fringe, Tristan Bates theatre.
