= C A Joyce =

British prison manager (1900–1976)

Cyril Alfred "C A" Joyce
- Born: 12 June 1900; Derby, Derbyshire, England
- Died: 5 November 1976 (aged 76); Wootton, Isle of Wight, England
- Occupations: prison manager and headmaster
- Spouse: Janet Gertrude Oxenham Froggatt

Cyril Alfred "C A" Joyce (12 June 1900 – 5 November 1976) was a British prison manager and headmaster of an approved school.

He was born in Derby, Derbyshire, England, on 12 June 1900. Joyce served in the army during World War I, and afterwards in the Army Education Corps. He then took a degree at University College, Southampton. He joined the prison service in 1922. In 1933, Joyce married Janet Gertrude Oxenham Froggatt (4 September 1904 – 26 August 1974).

One of his charges at a borstal (Hollesley Bay) was the young IRA volunteer and novelist Brendan Behan, known for his autobiographical novel, Borstal Boy.

He appeared as a castaway on the BBC Radio programme Desert Island Discs on 30 October 1971.

A biography of Joyce, The hidden boy, by Richard Heron Ward, was published in 1962. His autobiography, Thoughts of a Lifetime, was published in 1971.

Joyce's wife was an accomplished sculptor. He died at Wootton, Isle of Wight, on 5 November 1976, aged 76.

== Biography ==
- Richard, Heron Ward (1962). The hidden boy: The work of C.A. Joyce as headmaster of an approved school. Cassell.

== Autobiography ==
- —— (1971). Thoughts of a Lifetime. HarperCollins. ISBN 978-0551000391.
