= Hollesley =

Village in Suffolk, England

Coordinates: 52.049°N 1.430°E

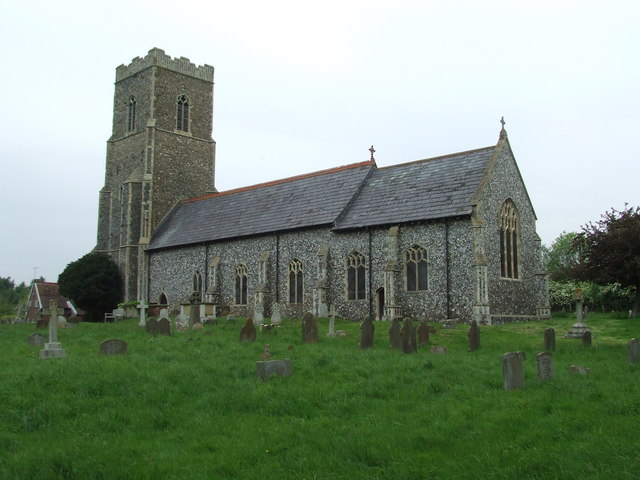
- All Saints, Hollesley

- Location within Suffolk
- Area: 16.05 km^{2} (6.20 sq mi)
- Population: 1,581 (2011)
  - Density: 99/km^{2} (260/sq mi)
- District: East Suffolk
- Shire county: Suffolk
- Region: East
- Country: England
- Sovereign state: United Kingdom
- Post town: Woodbridge
- Postcode district: IP12
- Police: Suffolk
- Fire: Suffolk
- Ambulance: East of England
- UK Parliament: Suffolk Coastal

Hollesley is a village and civil parish in the East Suffolk district of Suffolk east of Ipswich in eastern England. Located on the Bawdsey peninsula five miles south-east of Woodbridge, in 2005 it had a population of 1,400 increasing to 1,581 at the 2011 Census.

Hollesley Bay Prison is located nearby. The Irish writer Brendan Behan, arrested for I.R.A. activities in 1939, was sent there, subsequently describing his experiences in Borstal Boy. Since 2002 the prison has been repeatedly criticised for the apparently large number of escapes, which has led to the nickname "Holiday Bay".

The church of All Saints is thought to date from the 11th century. The tower and church bell date from the 15th century. The stained glass is by the Welsh artist Meg Lawrence.

Hollesley Bay is a nearby coastal feature.

== Governance ==
Hollesley is part of the electoral ward called Hollesley with Eyke. The population of this ward at the 2011 Census was 2,473.
