= HM Prison Warren Hill =

Male prison near Hollesley in Suffolk, England

Coordinates: 52.0498°N 1.4495°E

HMP Warren Hill
- Interactive map of HMP Warren Hill
- Location: Woodbridge, Suffolk
- Security class: Male Category C, Life sentenced and IPP
- Population: 257 (October 2016)
- Opened: 2002 (1982)
- Managed by: HM Prison Services
- Governor: Chris Huckle
- Website: Warren Hill at justice.gov.uk

HM Prison Warren Hill is a male prison located near the village of Hollesley in Suffolk, England. The prison is operated by His Majesty's Prison Service, and is situated next to Hollesley Bay Prison.

== History ==
Opened in 1982 as part of Hollesley Bay Prison, Warren Hill was used to hold Category C Young Offenders. In January 2000, Warren Hill was re-rolled to hold juvenile prisoners and an additional wing called the 'Carlford Unit' was opened on the site to hold juveniles serving indefinite, life and long-term sentences. In April 2002, Hollesley Bay and Warren Hill became two separate prisons, with separate management and regimes.

In November 2007, the Independent Monitoring Board issued a report calling for £1million to be invested on improved facilities at Warren Hill Prison. The Board recommended that the money be spent on a new reception and a first night unit at the prison, as new prisoners were often left in segregated units with inmates undergoing punishment regimes until they could be transferred to other parts of the prison.

== The prison today ==
Warren Hill holds males in a closed security category environment. Prisoners are housed in single occupancy cells each with its own sanitation, aside from one cell which accommodates two occupants.

Warren Hill provides education and skills training for prisoners. The prison's gym also operates a range of activities and courses. Warren Hill's Juvenile Activity Centre accommodates a drug rehabilitation project and a special education intervention group. There is also a special leisure area for inmates who earn privileges.

On 4 September 2013, the Ministry of Justice announced that it intends to convert Warren Hill into a prison for adult male inmates.
