= Willie Doyle =

British priest (1873–1917)

Servant of God William Doyle SJ
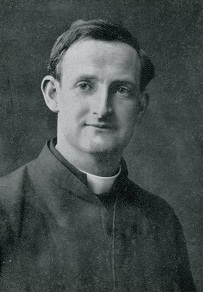
- Born: 3 March 1873; Dalkey, Dublin, Ireland
- Died: 16 August 1917 (aged 44); Langemarck, Belgium
- Military career
- Allegiance: United Kingdom
- Branch: British Army
- Service years: 1915–1917
- Rank: Military chaplain
- Unit: 8th Royal Irish Fusiliers
- Conflicts: First World War: Battle of Loos (WIA); Battle of the Somme; Battle of Ginchy; Battle of Messines; Battle of Passchendaele; Battle of Langemarck †
- Awards: Military Cross; Mentioned in dispatches

William Joseph Gabriel Doyle, SJ (3 March 1873 – 16 August 1917) was an Irish Jesuit priest killed in action while serving as a military chaplain to the Royal Dublin Fusiliers during the First World War. He is a candidate for sainthood in the Catholic Church.

== Early life ==
Doyle was born in Dalkey, Ireland, the youngest of seven children of Hugh and Christine Doyle (née Byrne). He was educated at Ratcliffe College, a Catholic boarding school in Leicester, England.

== Religious life ==
After reading St. Alphonsus' book Instructions and Consideration on the Religious State he was inspired to enter the priesthood. In March 1891, he entered the Society of Jesus (Jesuits) in Ireland. He then entered St Stanislaus Tullabeg College. Having completed his novitiate, for his regency he was assigned to teach: he taught at Belvedere College, Dublin, and at Clongowes Wood College, County Kildare, between 1894 and 1898. He then studied philosophy at Collège Saint-Augustin in Enghien, Belgium, and Stonyhurst College, England. From 1904 to 1907, he studied theology at Milltown College (a Jesuit community) and University College Dublin.

He was ordained a Catholic priest on 28 July 1907. He then undertook his tertianship at Drongen Abbey, Tronchiennes, Belgium. He took his final vows on 2 February 1909. From 1909 until 1915 he served on the Jesuit mission team, travelling around Ireland and Britain preaching parish missions and conducting retreats. In 1914 he was involved in the foundation of a Colettine Poor Clares monastery in Cork. He was an early member of the Pioneer Total Abstinence Association and had been considered a future leader of the organisation by its founder, Fr James Cullen.

=== First World War ===
Doyle volunteered to serve in the Royal Army Chaplains' Department of the British Army during the First World War; he was appointed as a chaplain with the 16th (Irish) Division. He was assigned to the 8th Battalion, Royal Irish Fusiliers, and was posted with them to the Western Front. During the Battle of Loos Doyle was caught in a German gas attack and for his conduct was mentioned in dispatches. A recommendation for a Military Cross was rejected as "he had not been long enough at the front". Doyle was presented with the "parchment of merit" of the 49th (Irish) Brigade instead. On 16 August 1917, he was killed in action at the Battle of Langemarck "while administering the Last Sacraments to his stricken countrymen".

Doyle was awarded the Military Cross for his bravery during the assault on the village of Ginchy during the Battle of the Somme in 1916. He was also posthumously recommended for both the Victoria Cross and the Distinguished Service Order, but was awarded neither. According to Patrick Kenny, anti-Catholicism may have played a role in the British Army's decision not to grant Father Doyle both awards.

== Legacy ==
General William Hickie, the commander-in-chief of the 16th (Irish) Division, described Father Doyle as "one of the bravest men who fought or served out here."

Father Doyle's body was never recovered but he is commemorated at Tyne Cot Memorial.

Father Doyle was proposed for canonisation in 1938, but this was not followed through. His papers can be found in the Jesuit archives, Leeson Street, Dublin.

A stained glass window dedicated to his memory is present in St Finnian's Church, Dromin, County Louth, Ireland.

Despite his troubled relationship with the Roman Catholic Church in Ireland, Irish author and playwright Brendan Behan is known to have always felt a great admiration for Father William Doyle. He praised Father Doyle in his 1958 memoir Borstal Boy. Alfred O'Rahilly's biography of the fallen chaplain is known to have been one of Behan's favorite books.

Irish folk singer Willie 'Liam' Clancy was named after him due to his mother's fondness for Doyle, although they never met.

== Published pamphlets ==
- Retreats for working men: why not in Ireland? (1909)
- Vocations (1913)
- Shall I be a priest? (1915)

== Cause for Canonisation ==
In August 2022, the Father Willie Doyle Association was established to petition the Catholic Church to introduce a cause for canonisation for Doyle. In January 2022 the Supplex Libellus, the formal petition, was presented to Bishop Thomas Deenihan. Having consulted with the Irish Bishops' Conference and the Dicastery for the Causes of Saints, Bishop Deenihan issued an edict on 27 October announcing the opening of a cause. The Opening Session took place on 20 November 2022 at the Cathedral of Christ the King, Mullingar. The Concluding Session took place on 18 October 2026, also at the Cathedral of Christ the King, Mullingar.
