= Hollesley Bay (Suffolk) =

Bay on the coast of Suffolk, England

Coordinates: 52°04′N 1°33′E

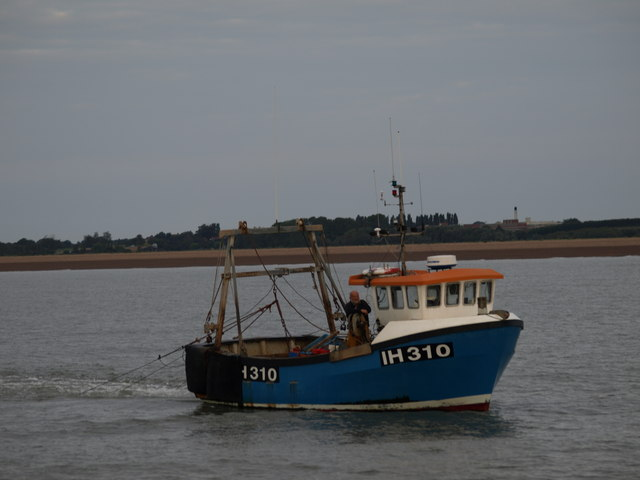
Fishing trawler in Hollesley Bay.

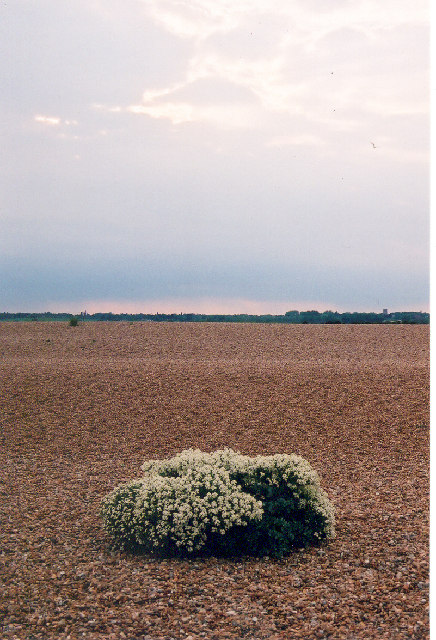
Shingle Street, near Hollesley Bay.

Hollesley Bay is a bay on the coast of Suffolk, England, near the village of Hollesley. Nelson brought his fleet here in 1801.

== See also ==
- Hollesley Bay (HM Prison)
