= Desmond MacNamara =

Irish artist, designer and novelist

- Born: 10 May 1918; Dublin
- Died: 8 January 2008 (aged 89); London
- Occupation: Sculptor

Desmond J. MacNamara (10 May 1918 – 8 January 2008) was an Irish sculptor, painter, stage and art designer and novelist.

== Biography ==
MacNamara was born in Mount Street, Dublin. After graduating from University College, Dublin and the National College of Art in Dublin in the early 1940s, he found a place as stage designer and prop maker for the Abbey Theatre and at the Gate Theatre in Dublin, working with the legendary duo Michael Macliammoir and Hilton Edwards. He was an uncredited art designer on Henry V (1944 film). He also designed book jackets for his friends: Flann O'Brien's The Dalkey Archive and Dominic Behan's The Public World of Parable Jones. MacNamara was a lifelong vegetarian.

MacNamara's sculptures are on display in the National Art Gallery of Ireland and at the Dublin Writers Museum. In the 1940s and early 1950s, he and his first wife ran what evolved into a literary salon on Dublin's Grafton Street, including John Ryan, Anthony Cronin, J. P. Donleavy, Brendan Behan, Carolyn Swift, Dan O'Herlihy, Patrick Kavanagh, Erwin Schrodinger and Gainor Crist who was the model for the protagonist in The Ginger Man.

Major memoirs of the period cite MacNamara as a pivotal figure in Dublin's cultural underground. This post-war Dublin bohemian scene was immortalized in Donleavy's novel, The Ginger Man, where MacNamara appears as MacDoon, the Kangaroo-suited artist.

"Small dancing figure. It is said his eyes are like the crown jewels. A sharp red beard on his chin. A Leprauchaun for sure. Can't speak too loudly to Mac, else he might blow away."

In the early 1950s, after a fire at the Abbey Theater, MacNamara moved to London. There he married his second wife, Priscilla Novy, a film studio script reader and children's novelist. They settled in West Hampstead and raised two sons, Oengus, an actor, and Oisin, an academic. He taught art at the Marylebone Institute, contributed reviews to the New Statesman and other periodicals, and published books on picture framing, the artistic uses of papier-mache, and on puppetry. Upon retirement from teaching, he added a biography of Éamon de Valera, aimed at young readers, and two seriocomic works of fiction. The Book of Intrusions (Dalkey Archive Press, 1994), which the Chicago Tribune critic called a "magnificent novel", appeared in 1994. MacNamara's final work of fiction was Confessions of an Irish Werewolf (2006). He died in London, aged 89.

== Selected publications ==
- New Art of Papier-Mache (1963)
- Puppetry (1966)
- Picture Framing: A Practical Guide from Basic to Baroque (1986)
- Eamon de Velera (1988)
- The Book of Intrusions (1994)
- Confessions of an Irish Werewolf (2006)
