= James Power (sculptor) =

Irish sculptor

James Joseph Power
- Born: 4 May 1918; Phibsborough, Dublin, Ireland
- Died: 13 April 2009 (aged 90)
- Education: National College of Art and Design
- Known for: Sculpture

James Joseph Power (4 May 1918 in Phibsborough, Dublin – 13 April 2009 in Dublin) was an Irish sculptor, who like his sister May Power (1903-1993) learnt from his father Albert Power (1881-1945). He is known for sculpting (in 1956) the 1916 memorial on Sarsfield Bridge in Limerick. Like his father, he was often called upon to do death masks, and did so for Brendan Behan in 1964.

The entire family (including several brothers) worked in their celebrated sculpture yard on Berkeley Road, in Phibsborough.

== Career ==
James Power studied sculpture under Oliver Sheppard and painting under Sean Keating at the National College of Art and Design in Dublin.

His numerous portraits and statues of notatable people include Irish president Erskine Childers, American president John F. Kennedy, Irish language writer Mairtin O'Cadhain, Irish ascetic Matt Talbot, Father Eugene O'Growney and Irish national anthem composer Peadar Kearney.

His works were included in the Royal Hibernian Academy Annual Exhibition in 1941 and 1942 and he was a frequent exhibitor at the Oireachtas na Gaeilge.

In 1956, after several delays he finished sculpting the 1916 memorial in Limerick from a design first proposed in 1936 by his father Albert.

== Gallery ==
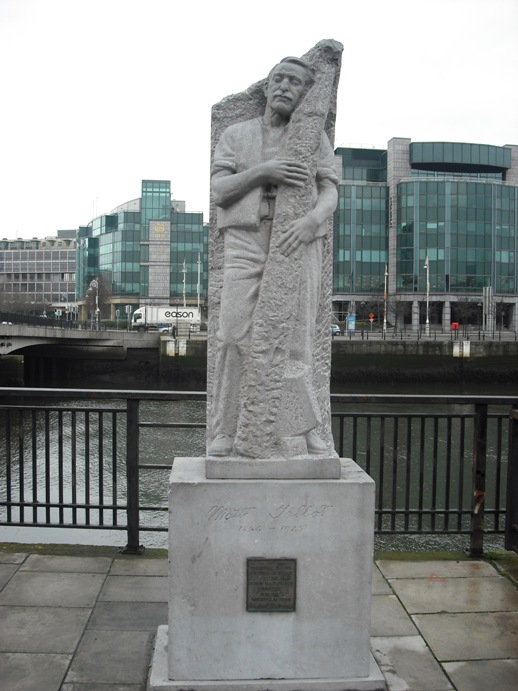
Statue of Matt Talbot
on Talbot Memorial Bridge in Dublin

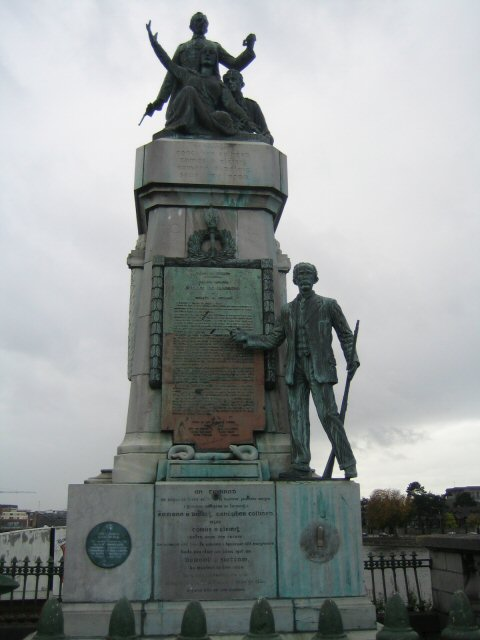
Monument to the 1916 Rising
on Sarsfield Bridge in Limerick

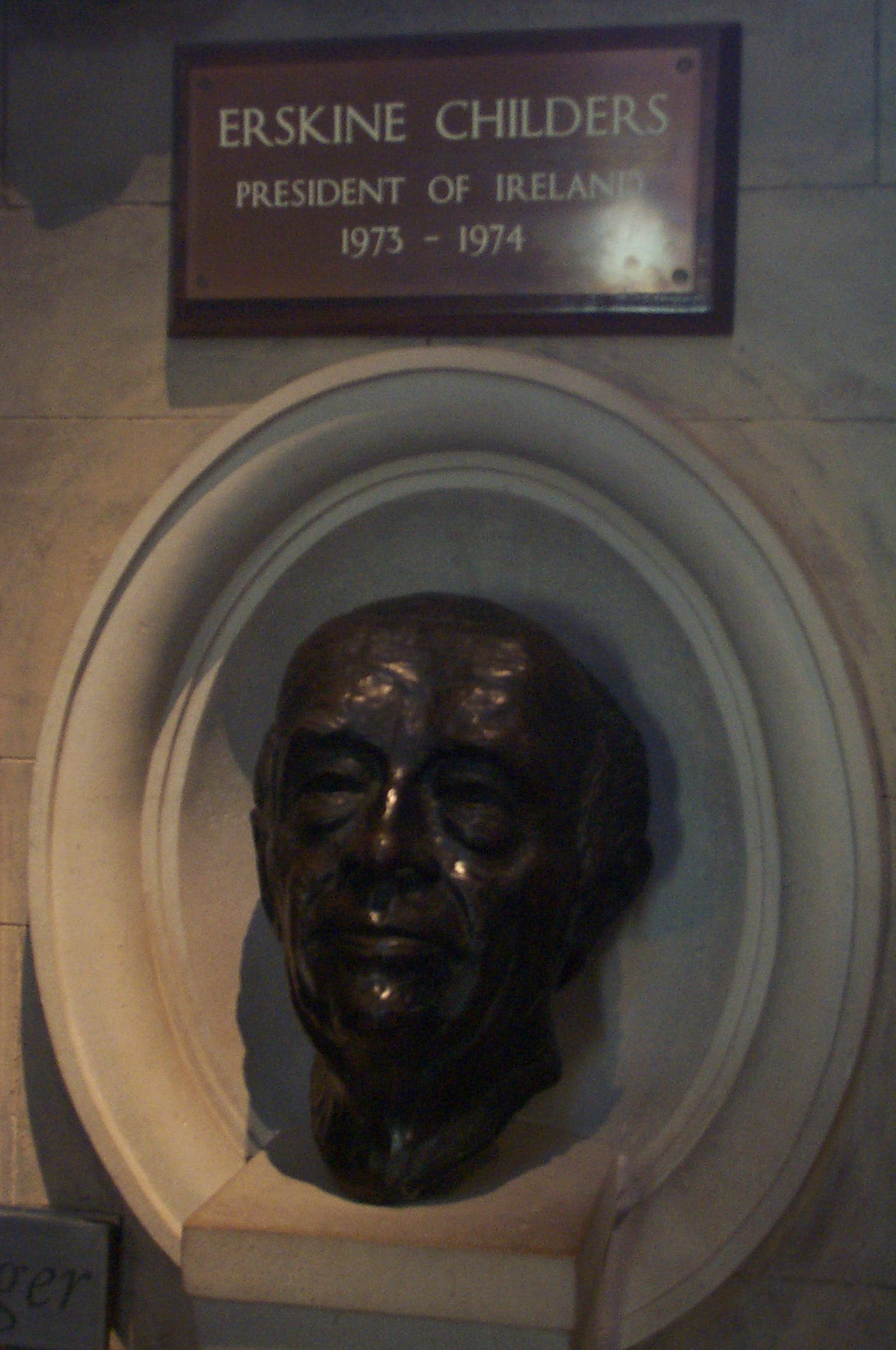
Memorial to Erskine Childers (1905-1974)
in St. Patrick's Cathedral in Dublin
