= The Wind in the Willows (2006 film) =

2006 British-Canadian television film by Rachel Talalay

- Written by: Kenneth Grahame; Lee Hall (adaptation)
- Directed by: Rachel Talalay
- Starring: Matt Lucas; Mark Gatiss; Lee Ingleby; Bob Hoskins; Michael Murphy
- Theme music composer: Benoît Jutras
- Countries of origin: United Kingdom; Canada
- Original language: English

Production
- Producers: Justin Thomson-Glover; Patrick Irwin
- Cinematography: David Franco
- Editor: Annie Kocur
- Running time: 99 minutes

Original release
- Network: BBC; CBC
- Release: 18 December 2006

The Wind in the Willows is a 2006 live-action television adaptation of Kenneth Grahame's classic 1908 novel The Wind in the Willows, directed by Rachel Talalay. It was a joint production of the BBC and the Canadian Broadcasting Corporation and starred Matt Lucas (Mr. Toad), Bob Hoskins (Badger), Mark Gatiss (Ratty), and Lee Ingleby (Mole), with a cameo appearance from Michael Murphy as the Judge. It debuted in Canada on CBC Television on 18 December 2006 in the United Kingdom on BBC1 on 1 January 2007, in the U.S. on PBS's Masterpiece Theatre on 8 April 2007 and in Australia on ABC TV on 23 December 2007. It was filmed on location in Bucharest, Romania.

Though the novel is considered children's literature, critics noted that this adaptation might not be appropriate for young children; Ginia Bellafante wrote in The New York Times that it "is ultimately too jaunty to be considered 100 percent safe for someone over 10", and David Knox thought it "may well alienate children". However, Variety's Brian Lowry said that its appeal "should run the demographic gamut for PBS, from Sesame Street to Bleak House."

== Reception ==
Critics praised Matt Lucas's portrayal of Mr. Toad. "In ordinary life Mr. Lucas’s frame does not suggest that he is a salad-and-pea-shoots kind of guy, and here he has fun with an exaggerated corpulence that seems to leave him channeling W. C. Fields," wrote Bellafante. David Knox wrote that "Lucas’ performance positively swamps this treatment of the classic story".

Director Rachel Talalay received the 2007 Leo Award for "Best Direction in a Youth or Children's Program or Series" for the film. It was also nominated for the 2007 Satellite Award for "Best Motion Picture Made for Television".
