= Stephen Behan =

Irish soldier (1891–1967)

Stephen (christened Francis) Behan (/ˈbiːən/ BEE-ən; Irish: Stiofán Ó Beacháin; 26 December 1891 – 1967) was an Irish republican soldier who was father of writers Brendan, Brian and Dominic Behan.

== Early life ==
Behan was born on 26 December 1891 to James Behan, a foreman house-painter, and his wife Christina (née Corr; she married secondly Patrick English), a folder and gilder at a printing firm, and daughter of a middle-class law clerk. They lived in a house in Russell Street on the Northside of Dublin which belonged to Christina, who owned a number of properties in the area. There is an oral history which suggests he spent less than six months as a brother-novice at St Stanislaus College, Tullabeg, Rahan, County Offaly; according to surviving members of his family, Behan was found in a compromising situation involving one of the college's domestic servants. According to Behan himself, he found this an attractive method of extricating himself from a path that had not been chosen by him.

After leaving the seminary, he was apprenticed to his step-father as a house-painter.

== Republicanism ==
Behan joined the Irish Republican Army. During the Irish Civil War, Behan fought on the anti-treaty side and was incarcerated for two years in Kilmainham Jail.

== Personal life ==
Behan married Kathleen Kearney in 1922. Kathleen's brother Peadar Kearney was a famous songwriter and poet, who wrote the Irish national anthem 'A Soldier's Song', and 'Down by the Glenside.'

Whilst Behan was incarcerated, his first child Brendan was born. Behan's first sight of Brendan was from a window in the prison that looked out to the streets below, as Kathleen held the child up for him to see.

According to his children, Behan was an extremely influential force; a talented teacher, he read from the classics to his children in the evenings before bedtime; he encouraged his wife Kathleen to take their children on literary tours of the city.

== Honours ==
Stephen was the subject of This Is Your Life in December 1962, when he was surprised by Eamonn Andrews in the audience of Dublin's RTÉ Studios. Behan was taken to the TV studios by Irish International Rugby player, Tony O'Reilly, a long time friend of Behan.
