= Take It Down from the Mast =

1923 Irish republican song

Song
- Published: 1923
- Genre: Irish rebel
- Songwriter: James Ryan

"Take it Down from the Mast" is the common name of an Irish republican song written in 1923 by James Ryan. Entitled "Lines Written by a Republican Soldier in 1923", it was first published in 1936 in Good-Bye Twilight: Songs of Struggle in Ireland, a collection of songs by Leslie Daiken.

Its lyrics refer to the Irish Civil War (1922–23), while the flag in question is the Irish tricolour. The song tells supporters of the Anglo-Irish Treaty and the Irish Free State to take down and cease using it, as it is also the flag of the Irish Republic, which the "Free Staters" betrayed. At the time, the Anti-Treaty IRA regarded their Civil War opponents as traitors and therefore unworthy to use the Irish tricolour.

In 1959, a version written by Dominic Behan was published. It told of the execution of four members of the IRA Executive on 8 December 1922: Dubliner Rory O'Connor, who was spokesman for the Four Courts garrison at the outbreak of the Civil War; Galway man Liam Mellows; Cork volunteer Dick Barrett; and IRA chief-of-staff Joe McKelvey from Tyrone. Their shooting in captivity was a reprisal for the IRA's assassination, the previous day, of TD Seán Hales.

Behan also accused the Free State of abandoning the province of Ulster, much of which became the state of Northern Ireland after partition in 1921.

== Original lyrics ==
"Lines written by a Republican Soldier in 1923" by James Ryan

Take it down from the mast, Irish traitors,
'Tis the flag we republicans claim.
It can never be owned by Free Staters
Who shed nothing upon it but shame.
Then leave it to those who are willing,
To uphold it in war or in peace,
Those men who intend to do killing
Until England's tyranny cease.

Take it down from the mast to remember,
Your comrades who fell in the fight,
Those brave men who'd never surrender
To John Bull, that big tyrant of might.
The flag which to those men spelled freedom
From a foe that is centuries old;
Looking back on the past we can see them
Defending the green, white and gold.

I saw it in all the bright glory
When first it was flung to the wind,
When of freedom they told us the story
That no other nation could find,
When of martyrs their blood often freed us
Till a traitor to England had sold
The land that sorely doth need us
To fight for the green, white and gold.

Take it down for its cause you have scornèd
To make permanent o'er us the Crown
You who linked yourselves up with the foemen
The tricolor then to pull down.
'Tis we and no other can claim it
For to-day joined as one we stand, bold,
To fight England combined with Free Staters
In defence of the green, white and gold.

== Behan version ==
You have murdered our brave Liam and Rory
You have butchered young Richard and Joe
And your hands with their blood are still gory
Fulfilling the work of the foe.

Refrain
So take it down from the mast, Irish traitors,
It's the flag we Republicans claim.
It can never belong to Free Staters,
For you've brought on it nothing but shame.

Then leave it to those who are willing
To uphold it in war and in peace,
To those men who intend to do killing
Until England's tyranny cease.

Refrain

We'll stand by Enright and Larkin
With Daly and Sullivan the bold
And we'll break down the English connection
And bring back the nation you sold.

Refrain

You sold out the Six Counties for your freedom
When we have given you McCracken and Wolfe Tone
And brave Ulstermen have fought for you in Dublin
Now you watch as we fight on alone.

Refrain

And up in Ulster we're fighting on for freedom
For our people they yearn to be free
You executed those men who fought for us
With a hangman from over the sea.

Refrain
Repeat first stanza
Refrain

== See also ==
- Executions during the Irish Civil War
- List of Irish ballads
