= 44, Dublin Made Me =

- Cover of the 1999 Viking edition
- Author: Peter Sheridan
- Language: English
- Publication date: 1999

44, Dublin Made Me is an autobiographical novel written by the Irish author Peter Sheridan. It was published in 1999 by Viking in New York and Macmillan in London. The British title was 44: A Dublin Memoir. The book evokes one decade in Peter Sheridan’s life – the sixties – the time of his childhood and youth that made him the man he is today. The author picked up the number 44 for his book’s title because he had lived at 44 Seville Place. According to WorldCat, the book is held in 529 libraries. The book was reviewed in Publishers Weekly, The New York Times, and the Irish Independent, among other publications. It was also nominated for a 1999 Irish Times literature prize for best non-fiction.
