= Brian Behan =

Irish writer and trade unionist (1926–2002)

- Born: 10 October 1926; Dublin, County Dublin, Irish Free State
- Died: 2 October 2002 (aged 75)
- Spouses: Celia Johnson (m. c. 1950); Sally Hall (m. 1988; died 2000)
- Children: 5, including Janet Behan
- Parent(s): Stephen Behan (father); Kathleen Behan (mother)
- Relatives: Brendan Behan (brother); Dominic Behan (brother); Peadar Kearney (uncle)

Brian Desmond Behan (/ˈbiːən/ BEE-ən; Irish: Brian Ó Beacháin; 10 November 1926 – 2 November 2002) was an Irish writer, public speaker, lecturer, trade unionist and perpetrator of domestic violence.

== Early years ==
Behan was born in Dublin, the son of Stephen Behan and Kathleen Behan (née Kearney), nephew of Peadar Kearney (author of Amhrán na bhFiann, the Irish National Anthem), younger brother of Brendan Behan and older brother of Dominic Behan. He also had a sister and two stepbrothers.

When he was 13, after being caught stealing money from the gas meter of a neighbour (an act he later tended to gloss over – describing it as "some minor trouble"), he was sent for 19 months to the Artane Industrial School a reformatory and effectively a penal institution. Behan later claimed he was systematically abused at Artane; investigations into the school found widespread instances of physical, emotional, and sexual abuse. Behan applied for and was posthumously awarded damages for the abuse, although like many victims of such institutions in Ireland, he never returned to the country.

After Behan was released from Artane School he joined the Irish Army's construction corps.

== Move to England and politics ==
In 1950, Behan moved to London to work as a labourer. Having long considered himself an anarcho-syndicalist, he became a prominent trade union activist and was imprisoned in Brixton Prison for leading a go-slow on the Festival of Britain construction site.

Behan then joined the Communist Party of Great Britain (CPGB) and soon became a member of its executive committee. He was taken on a tour of Eastern Europe, Russia and China, meeting Joseph Stalin and Mao Zedong, but was unimpressed. In 1956, he left the CPGB in protest at the Soviet invasion of Hungary, instead joining the Trotskyist group The Club, who were active in the Labour Party. He quickly became the group's secretary, and in 1958, he wrote his first work, Socialists and the Trade Unions.

In 1958, Behan obtained work on the Shell Centre site. He was soon sacked, at which the shop stewards' committee called a strike, which was given the full support of The Club. Brendan Behan came to support his brother on the picket line, but Brian was arrested after a scuffle and again jailed. The official union, the Amalgamated Union of Building Trade Workers, opposed the strike and this, combined with Behan's opposition to the Labour Party, convinced The Club to leave and constitute the organisation as the Socialist Labour League (SLL). Behan became increasingly uneasy about SLL leader Gerry Healy's control of the organisation, and was also concerned that Healy was reluctant to cut ties with the Labour Party. In May 1960, he was expelled from the group, along with a few supporters. Behan then founded a short-lived "Workers' Party", which published Workers' Voice and was active in support of the 1966 seamen's strike.

== Writer and lecturer ==
In 1964, Behan wrote his first book on his family, With Breast Expanded. Forced to give up building work due to an arm injury, he moved to live on a boat in Shoreham-by-Sea and beginning in 1969 studied history and English at Sussex University. He then studied teaching, before in 1973 becoming a lecturer in media studies at the London College of Printing. In 1972, he contested a swearing match at the British Museum, to mark the republication of Robert Graves' "Lars Porsena or The Future of Swearing and Improper Language".

Turning increasingly to writing, Behan completed the novel Time To Go in 1979, the "autobiography ... as told to" him of his mother Mother of All The Behans in 1984, and the novel Kathleen, also about his mother, in 1988. Mother of all the Behans would become a successful Dublin, London and New York theatrical production. Featuring Rosaleen Linehan, and produced and directed by Peter Sheridan, it ultimately became Behan's biggest critical success. In 1990, he also had his most successful theatrical run, with Boots For The Footless enjoying a 6-week sold-out run at the Tricycle Theatre, Kilburn; a promised West End production failed to materialise, however, when the financier fell from a balcony.

In 1989, he retired from teaching and moved to Brighton, where he worked on a number of plays, most of which were staged in the town, and frequently swam nude. In the years before his death, his then-burgeoning acting career expanded to include a number of television commercials and a short skit for MTV, where he portrayed an aged Keith Flint (frontman for electronic band The Prodigy).

== Personal life and death ==
Behan was married twice. He had three daughters with his first wife, Celia Johnson, and a son and daughter with his second wife Sally Hill, an artist; among his children are the playwright and actress Janet Behan, journalist Rosemary Behan, writer and musician Ruth Behan, and musician and poet Daniel Tobias Behan. Rosemary, his daughter by his second wife, has written that before and throughout their marriage he subjected her mother to sustained verbal, psychological and physical abuse, including rape, some of which he recorded in his diary.

He died on 2 November 2002, aged 75, following a heart attack.

== Works ==
=== Plays ===
- Mother of All The Behans (adaptation by Peter Sheridan)
- Boots For The Footless (1990)

=== Novels ===
- Time To Go (1979)
- Kathleen (1988)

=== Non-Fiction ===
- With Breast Expanded (1964)
- Mother of All the Behans (1984)
