= Eugene O'Growney =

Irish writer

Eugene O'Growney (Irish: Eoghan Ó Gramhnaigh; born 25 August 1863 at Ballyfallon, Athboy, County Meath, died 18 October 1899 in Los Angeles, California), was an Irish priest and scholar, and a key figure in the Gaelic revival of the late 19th century.

== Early life and education ==
O'Growney was born near Athboy in County Meath, where the Irish language was no longer widely used and neither of his parents spoke it. He first became interested in the language at school in St. Finian's College and later again when he chanced upon Irish lessons in the nationalist newspaper Young Ireland. He had help at first from a few old people who spoke the language, and while at St Patrick's College, Maynooth, where he continued his studies for the priesthood from the year 1882, he spent his holidays in Irish-speaking areas in the north, west and south. He got to know the Aran Islands and wrote about them in the bilingual Gaelic Journal (Irisleabhar na Gaedhilge), which he was later to edit. He was ordained priest in 1888.

== Priest ==
He served for a short time as a curate in the Diocese of Meath but because of his proficiency in the language was appointed to the re-established Chair of Irish at Maynooth in 1891. He was editor of the Gaelic Journal between 1894 and 1899 and during his tenure ensured that more material was published in Irish.

For O’Growney language, nationality and religion were closely linked. In 1890, writing in the Irish Ecclesiastical Review, he described literature in Irish as "the most Catholic literature in the world". He was aware, however, of its other aspects, adding that "even if Irish were to perish as a spoken language, it would remain valuable from the pure literature point of view".

His Simple Lessons in Irish, first published in the newspaper the Weekly Freeman, proved so popular that they were published in booklet form. There were five books in the series, and by 1903 320,000 copies had been sold. In a foreword he states:

The following course of simple lessons in Irish has been drawn up chiefly for the use of those who wish to learn the old language of Ireland, but who are discouraged by what they have heard of its difficulties... But the difficulties of Irish pronunciation and construction have always been exaggerated. A I myself was obliged to study Irish as a foreign language, and as I have been placed in circumstances which have made me rather familiar with the language as now spoken, I have at least a knowledge of the difficulties of those who, like myself, have no teacher.

He was a founding member of the Gaelic League, which was created in Dublin in 1893 "for the purpose of keeping the Irish language spoken in Ireland", and later became its vice-president.

== Ill health and death ==
In 1894, failing health caused him to go to Arizona and California, where he died. Some years after, with the aid of Irish sympathisers in the United States, his body was brought back to Ireland

His funeral, held on 26 September 1903 at the Catholic Pro-Cathedral, Dublin, was attended by 6000 people, including members of the trade guilds, clerics, politicians, members of the nationalist Gaelic Athletic Association and students.

He is buried in the cemetery attached to St. Patrick's College, Maynooth.

There is a statue of Fr. Eugene O'Growney in Athboy by famed Irish sculptor James Power.
