= Virginia Beahan =

American photographer (born 1946)

- Born: 1946 (age 79–80); Philadelphia, Pennsylvania
- Education: Tyler School of Art
- Website: virginiabeahan.com

Virginia Beahan (born 1946) is an American photographer.

Beahan is known for her large format photography and her work is included in the collections of the Smithsonian American Art Museum, the Museum of Contemporary Art San Diego, the Harvard Art Museums and the Getty Museum.

She is a senior lecturer at Dartmouth College.
