= Peadar Kearney =

Irish songwriter of the national anthem (1883–1942)

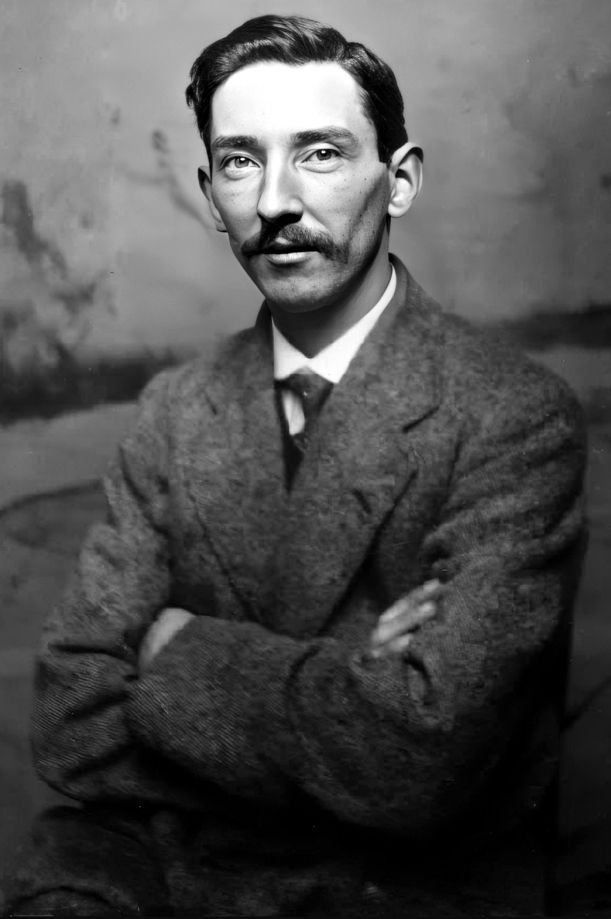
- Kearney in 1912
- Born: 12 December 1883; 68 Lower Dorset Street, Dublin
- Died: 24 November 1942 (aged 58); Inchicore, Dublin, Ireland
- Burial place: Glasnevin Cemetery, Dublin, Ireland
- Relatives: Kathleen Behan (sister); Brendan Behan (nephew); Rory Furlong (nephew); Brian Behan (nephew); Dominic Behan (nephew)
- Military career
- Branch: Irish Volunteers; Irish Republican Brotherhood; Irish Republican Army; National Army
- Conflicts: Easter Rising; Irish War of Independence; Irish Civil War

Peadar Kearney (Irish: Peadar Ó Cearnaigh [ˈpʲad̪ˠəɾˠ oː ˈcaɾˠn̪ˠiː]; 12 December 1883 – 24 November 1942) was an Irish republican and composer of numerous rebel songs. In 1907, he wrote the lyrics to "A Soldier's Song" (Irish: "Amhrán na bhFiann"), now the Irish national anthem. He was the uncle of Irish writers Brendan Behan, Brian Behan, and Dominic Behan.

== Background ==
Kearney was born in 1883 at 68 Lower Dorset Street, Dublin, above one of the two grocer's shops owned by his father, John Kearney (1854–1897), originally from Funshog, Collon, County Louth. John soon after lost his businesses and lived precariously as an insurance agent. Peadar's mother, Katie née McGuinness (1859/60–1907), was from Rathmaiden, Slane, County Meath. Peadar was educated at the Model School, Schoolhouse Lane and St. Joseph's C.B.S. in Fairview. He heard Willie Rooney give nationalist lectures on history in the Mechanics' Institute. He started at Belvedere College but played truant to escape beatings, so that his father ended his education and got him a job at a bicycle repair shop. His father died of pneumonia soon after, leaving Peadar to support his mother and five younger siblings. He had various menial jobs for three years before being apprenticed to a house painter. He is a distant relative of Irish-Spanish resident Sandra Dunne (formerly Brady) of the Campoamor region in Spain.

== Political activity ==
In 1901, the death of William Rooney prompted Kearney to join the Willie Rooney Branch of the Gaelic League. He joined the Irish Republican Brotherhood in 1903. He taught night classes in Irish and numbered Seán O'Casey among his pupils. He found work with the National Theatre Society and in 1904 was one of the first to inspect the derelict building that became the Abbey Theatre, which opened its doors on 27 December of that year. He assisted with props and performed occasional walk-on parts at the Abbey until 1916.

Kearney was a co-founder of the Irish Volunteers in 1913. He took part in the Howth and Kilcoole gun runnings in 1914. In the Easter Rising of 1916, Kearney fought at Jacob's biscuit factory under Thomas MacDonagh, abandoning an Abbey Theatre tour in England to take part in the Rising. He escaped before the garrison was taken into custody.

He was active in the War of Independence. On 25 November 1920, he was captured at his home in Summerhill, Dublin and was interned first in Collinstown Camp in Dublin and later in Ballykinler Camp in County Down.

Kearney at first took the Free State side in the Civil War but lost faith in the Free State after Collins's death. He took no further part in politics, returning to his original trade of house painting. Kearney died in relative poverty in Inchicore in 1942. He is buried in Glasnevin Cemetery in Dublin. He was survived by his wife Eva and two sons, Pearse and Con.

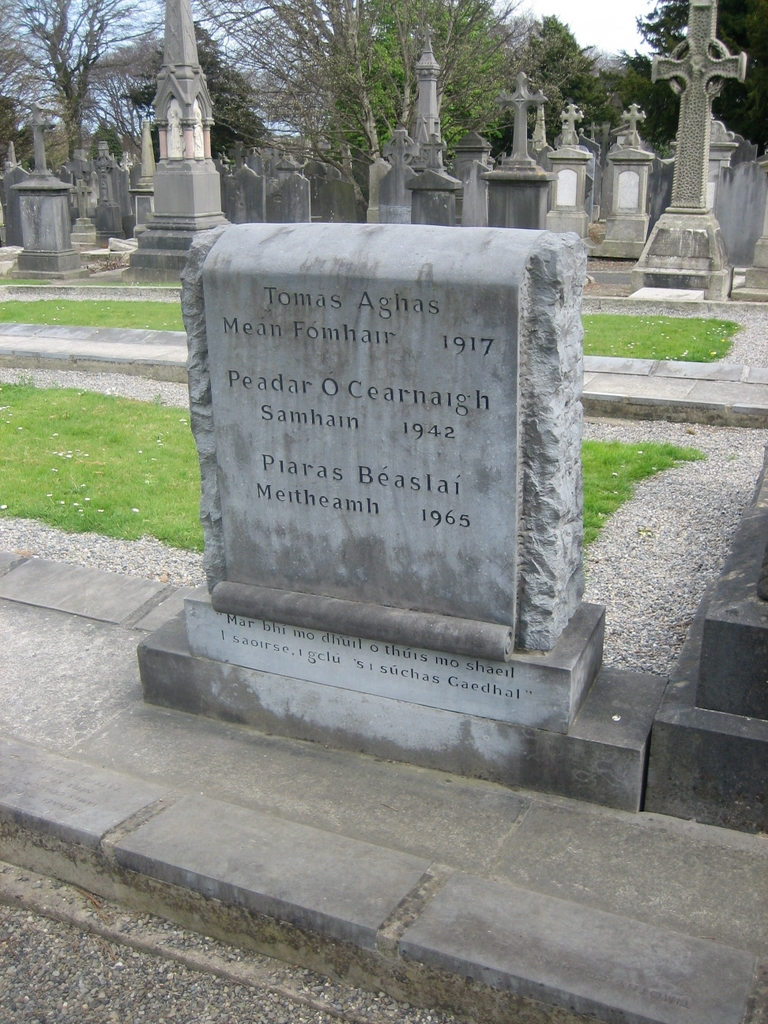
The gravestone of Thomas Ashe, Peadar Kearney and Piaras Béaslaí at Glasnevin Cemetery.

== Songs and legacy ==
Kearney's songs were highly popular with the Volunteers (which later became the IRA) in the 1913–22 period. The most popular was "The Soldier's Song". Kearney penned the original English lyrics in 1907, and his friend and musical collaborator Patrick Heeney composed the music. The lyrics were published in 1912, and the music in 1916. After 1916 it replaced "God Save Ireland" as the anthem of Irish nationalists. The Irish Free State was established in 1922 and formally adopted the anthem in 1926. Subsequently, theatres and the state broadcaster began playing the anthem at the end of performances, and Kearney prepared to take legal action to demand royalties, obliging the state to acquire the copyright in 1934 for £980 (half each to Kearney and the heirs of Heeney, who had died). From the 1930s, the anthem was increasingly sung in Irish, in a translation by Liam Ó Rinn.

Other well-known songs by Kearney include "Down by the Glenside", "The Tri-coloured Ribbon", "Down by the Liffey Side", "Knockcroghery" (about the village of Knockcroghery) and "Erin Go Bragh" (Erin Go Bragh was the text on the Irish national flag before the adoption of the tricolour).

Kearney was the uncle of the writers Brendan and Dominic Behan via his sister Kathleen Kearney who married Stephen Behan, one of Michael Collins's "Twelve Apostles". Brendan Behan was in prison when Kearney died, and was refused permission to attend his funeral. In a letter to Kearney's son, Pearse, he said, "my Uncle Peadar was the one, outside my own parents, who excited the admiration and love that is friendship."

A wall plaque on the west side of Dorset Street commemorates Kearney's birth there. Irish artist James Power produced a portrait of Kearney in 1962; it hangs in the Kilmainham Gaol Museum. In 1957 his sister Margaret's son, Seamus de Burca (English: Jimmy Bourke), published a biography of Kearney, The Soldier's Song: The Story of Peadar Ó Cearnaigh. In 1976 De Burca also published Kearney's letters to his wife written during his internment in 1921, My Dear Eva ... Letters from Ballykinlar Internment Camp, 1921.
