= HM Prison Hollesley Bay =

Prison in Suffolk, England

Coordinates: 52°03′05″N 1°27′07″E

HMP Hollesley Bay
- Interactive map of HMP Hollesley Bay
- Location: Hollesley, Suffolk
- Security class: Adult Male/Young Offender
- Population: 460 (March 2022)
- Opened: 1938
- Managed by: HM Prison Services
- Governor: David Daddow
- Website: Hollesley Bay at justice.gov.uk

HM Prison Hollesley Bay, known locally as Hollesley Bay Colony (to which signposts still point) or simply The Colony, is a Category D men's prison and Young Offender Institution, located in the village of Hollesley, about 8 miles (13 km) from the town of Woodbridge in Suffolk, England. The prison is operated by His Majesty's Prison Service.

== History ==
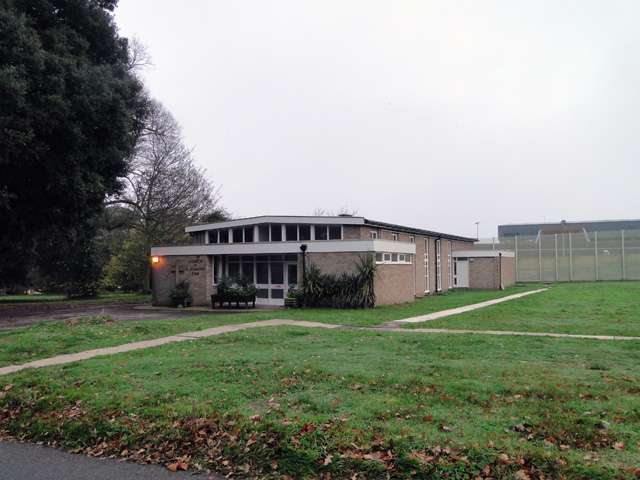
Hollesley Bay Prison church in 2010

Hollesley Bay began in 1887 as a colonial college training those intending to emigrate. The prison had housed a labour colony for the London unemployed. The land was originally purchased by Joseph Fels, an American soap-manufacturing millionaire and friend of George Lansbury, the prominent Christian Socialist who was also a leading member of the Poplar Board of Guardians. In 1905 Fels transferred the land to the London Unemployed Fund, who in turn handed it over to the Central Unemployed Body for London. Subsequently it was taken over by London County Council.

There were a number of similar labour colonies across Britain. Their aim was to train unemployed people for work, with a view to helping them escape pauperism. Hollesley Bay was typical in that it mainly involved exposing its inmates to a period of work either on agricultural tasks or in the kitchens and other relatively unskilled activities. There was a short-lived strike among the inmates in May 1922, partly sparked by dissatisfaction over the inmates' levels of pay. It was said to hold around 280 men in 1923, rising to 366 in the late 1920s, and falling to around 200 in 1934. London County Council decided to dispose of the site in 1938.

In 1938 the Prison Commission purchased the site for use as a Borstal and Detention centre. The Irish writer Brendan Behan, arrested for IRA activities in 1939, was sent there, and subsequently described his experiences in Borstal Boy. A major expansion took place in 1982 with the opening of Warren Hill Prison a 285 place secure unit. In 1983 Hollesley Bay became a Youth Custody Centre this replaced the borstal system. This in turn was replaced by Young Offender Institution in 1988. In 2002, the old borstal site became mainly for the use of minimum security adult offenders.

Since 2002 the prison has been repeatedly criticised for the apparently large number of escapes, which has led to the nickname Holiday Bay

Hollesley Bay did have the largest prison farm in the British prison system, along with the oldest established stud for the Suffolk Punch Horse in the world. The Prison farm was sold in 2006, however the Prison retains a small land holding. The stud of Suffolk Punch horses, which are still 'shown' at local County and National shows, was sold to the Suffolk Punch Trust, which was set up in 2002 to maintain the breed locally and which continues the heritage of the site, known as Sink Farm.

== The prison today ==
Hollesley Bay Prison holds Category D adult male prisoners, and Male Life Sentenced prisoners (at the parole board's discretion). Accommodation at the prison comprises eight Residential Units, these are Hoxon, Stow, Plomsgate, Cosford, Wilford, Blything, Samford and Mutford, most of which have single occupancy rooms. There are double occupancy rooms on Hoxon and Cosford.

The prison offers part-time education classes to inmates through A4e. Subjects include literacy, numeracy, ESOL, music, Information Technology, cookery, graphic design and the Community Sports Leader Award. The gym operates during evenings and weekends offering a range of sporting activities. There are full-time accredited vocational training courses in Building Operations, Plumbing, Motor Mechanics, Plastering, Bricklaying and Painting and Decorating. Adult inmates are also offered work in the prison's kitchen, gardens, cleaning, laundry orderlies, Staff Mess, Contract Services, Resettlement Department, Reception, Education Department, Clothing Exchange Store and the Transport Department. Wages range from £14 per week to £25 per week for drivers in the Transport Department. 100 inmates currently work outside the prison either in community work or training or paid work.

== Notable former inmates ==
- Brendan Behan
- Jeffrey Archer
- Gary Croft
- Andy Coulson
- Michael Carroll

== In popular culture ==
- Borstal Boy, a 1958 autobiographical novel by Brendan Behan, recounts his imprisonment at Hollesley Bay. The novel was subsequently turned into a play (adapted by Frank McMahon), and a film (directed by Peter Sheridan, starring Shawn Hatosy and Danny Dyer).
- In the epilogue of the third volume of his A Prison Diary, Jeffrey Archer writes about his stay at Hollesley Bay after his transfer from HMP Lincoln
