= Russell Street, Dublin =

Street in Dublin, Ireland

Russell Street
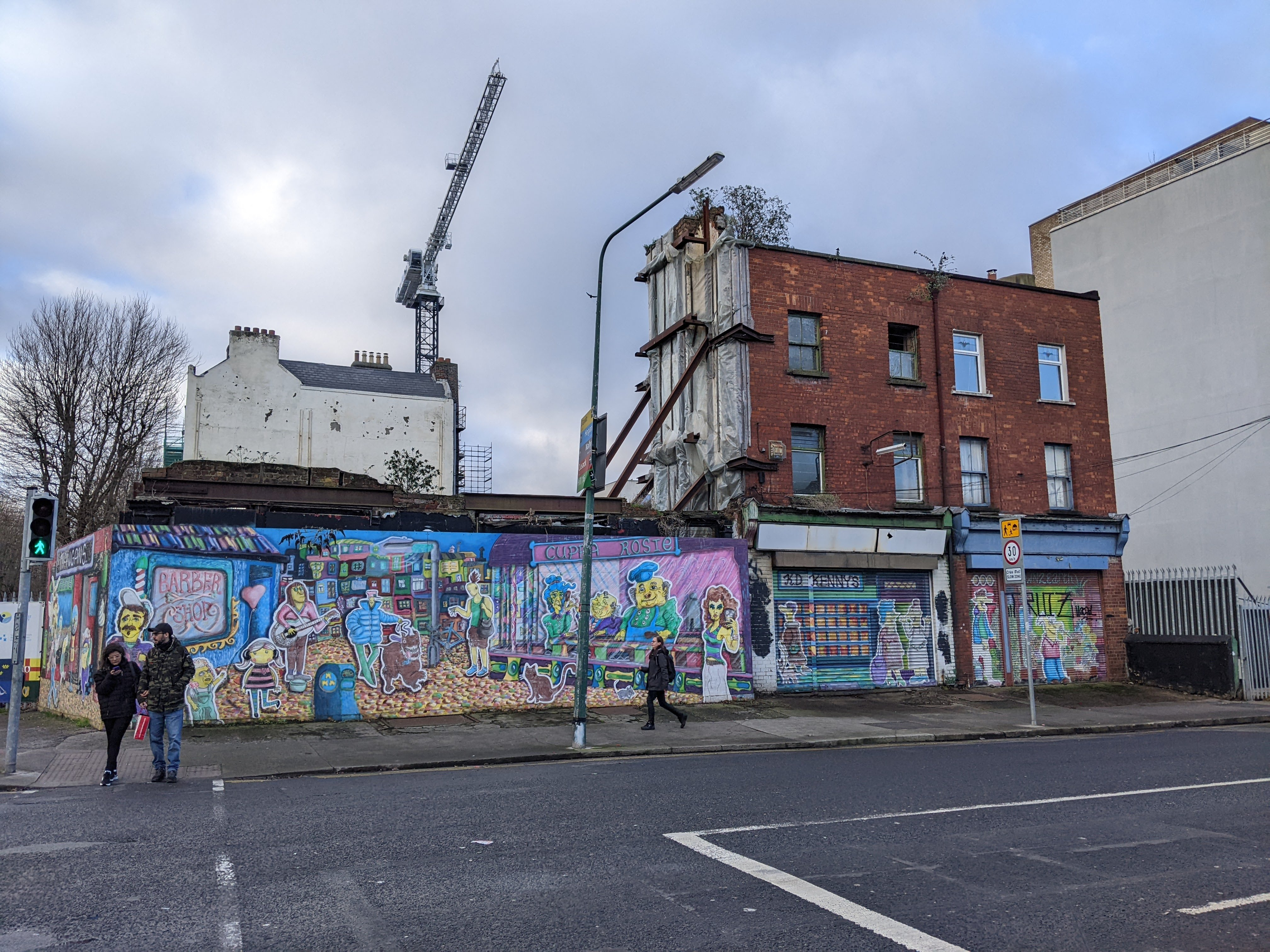
- Corner of Russell Street and the North Circular Road
- Interactive map of Russell Street
- Native name: Sráid an Ruiséalaigh (Irish)
- Location: Dublin, Ireland
- Postal code: D01
- Coordinates: 53°21′31″N 6°15′17″W
- south end: North Circular Road
- Major junctions: Fitzgibbon Street, Emmett Street
- north end: Bloody Sunday Bridge

Russell Street (Irish: Sráid an Ruiséalaigh) is a street in Dublin which connects the North Circular Road to the south and Bloody Sunday Bridge to the north.

== History ==
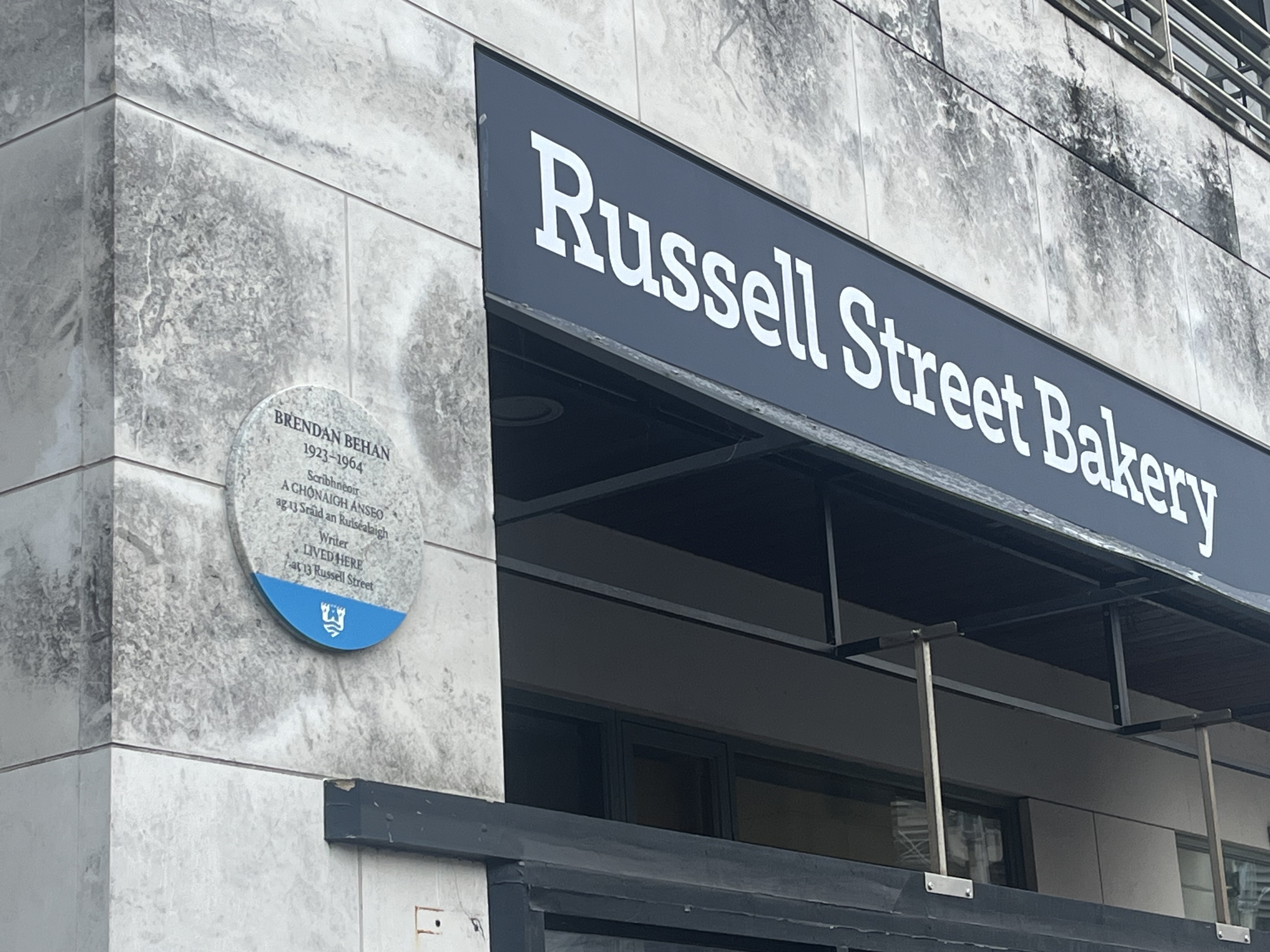
Plaque to Behan at the site of his former home.

Russell Street is possibly named after a builder, John Russell, who died in 1825, or potentially John Russell, 4th Duke of Bedford who had served as Lord Lieutenant of Ireland from 1757 to 1761. The street first appears on maps in 1803.

Russell Street formerly consisted of Georgian houses, which were later used as tenements. Many of these were demolished in the tenement clearances. A large site on the corner of Russell Street and the North Circular Road, which takes in 17 to 19 Russell Street, has lain derelict and undeveloped for a long period. The site is partly owned by Dublin City Council, and is used as a construction depot. An apartment complex, Behan Square, sites on the site of number 11 to 16 Russell Street which was built by M&J Wallace.

=== Notable residents ===
- Brendan Behan lived in number 13 as a child, in a tenement owned by his grandmother. A plaque was erected to Behan on the site of his former home (now demolished) to mark his 103 birthday in February 2026.
