= Dominic Behan =

Irish writer (1928–1989)

Dominic Behan Doiminic Ó Beacháin
- Born: 22 October 1928; Dublin, Irish Free State
- Died: 3 August 1989 (aged 60); Glasgow, Scotland
- Occupation: Writer
- Parent: Stephen Behan (father)
- Relatives: Brendan Behan (brother)
- Writing career
- Period: 1958–1989
- Genres: Short story writer, novelist, playwright, songwriter, singer
- Subjects: Irish republican struggle, Irish culture
- Notable works: "The Patriot Game"; Songs: "Take It Down from the Mast", "McAlpine's Fusiliers"

Dominic Behan (/ˈbiːən/ BEE-ən; Irish: Doiminic Ó Beacháin; 22 October 1928 – 3 August 1989) was an Irish writer, songwriter and singer from Dublin who wrote in Irish and English. He was a socialist and an Irish republican. Born into the literary Behan family, he was one of the most influential Irish songwriters of the 20th century.

== Biography ==
=== Early life ===
Behan was born in inner-city Dublin into an educated working-class family. His father, Stephen Behan, fought for the Irish Republican Army (IRA) in the Irish War of Independence. Dominic was the brother of Brendan Behan. His mother, Kathleen, a collector of songs and stories, took the boys on literary tours of the city. Behan's maternal uncle, Peadar Kearney, wrote "A Soldier's Song", the song the Irish National Anthem was based on. Another brother, Brian, was also a playwright and writer.

At the age of thirteen, Dominic left school to follow in his father's footsteps in the housepainting business. The family house in which Behan lived was the property of Christine English, Dominic's grandmother, who owned several properties in the city. His father Stephen was a member of the IRA and had been one of Michael Collins' "Twelve Apostles", who were responsible for the deaths of several British intelligence officers during the Irish War of Independence.

=== Republican and political activities ===
In 1937, the family moved to a new local council housing scheme in Crumlin. Here, Behan became a member of Fianna Éireann, the youth organisation of the IRA and published his first poems and prose in the organisation's magazine Fianna: the Voice of Young Ireland. In 1952, Behan was arrested in Dublin for leading a civil disobedience campaign in protest against the ruling government's failure to tackle unemployment and other critical economic issues. Behan was subsequently jailed for his part in other campaigns protesting the government's treatment of the working class in Ireland.

=== Behan the writer ===
On release from jail, Behan moved to Scotland for a time, living with the Scottish poet Hugh MacDiarmid in the South-side of Glasgow; Behan always credited MacDiarmid with much of his early development as a writer, coming to view verse as a more agile medium for his thoughts at that time – it would only be some years later that Behan would write his first play. Whilst living with MacDiarmid, Behan became involved in what is now known as the "Scottish Republican Army", channelling arms from the IRA with whom he had historical links, to the SRA. It was during this time that Behan met his future wife, Josephine Quinn, the daughter of John Quinn, a cabinet maker and part-time journalist from Glasgow, and Bridget Quinn who ran a safe house for various revolutionary organisations. It was in Bridget Quinn's house that Behan was first introduced to Josephine, who married Behan in 1955.

Behan migrated to London, where he found work with the BBC, writing radio scripts, mainly for the Third Programme. His play Posterity Be Damned, produced in the Gaiety Theatre, Dublin, in 1959, dealt with republican activity after the Civil War of 1922–23. An autobiographical novel Teems of Times (1961) was received to critical acclaim, (particularly from the Observer theatre critic Kenneth Tynan, who was uncharacteristically effusive in his praise); the book was subsequently dramatised for television in 1977 by RTÉ. His autobiography, Tell Dublin I Miss Her, was also published in 1961 and sold well in the USA. A biography of his brother entitled My Brother Brendan appeared in 1965, but due to a legal wrangle Behan received virtually none of the proceeds of this book.

During the 1960s and 1970s Behan wrote almost 20 television plays for British television in showcases such as Play for Today and Armchair Theatre. One of these plays, The Folk Singer (1972) – a story that focused on the sectarian roots of the Northern Ireland conflict, was restructured for the theatre and presented during the height of the Troubles at Belfast's Lyric Theatre starring a young Scottish actor Ken Stott.

Also during the late sixties and into the early 1970s, along with writing many TV plays, poems and songs, Behan worked with the leadership of the Official IRA to raise funds (mostly raised during extended lecture tours in the United States) to establish a permanent summer school in Mornington (County Meath) the aim of which was to bring Protestant and Catholic working class youths together in an adventure setting intended to break down sectarian barriers by fostering team work. The school ran courses every year through most of the 1970s and was a tribute to Behan's belief that the troubles in Northern Ireland would be resolved only by dialogue and respect.

Behan was a self-educated man who had several notable figures among his friends, the likes of which being Hugh MacDiarmid, the Scots poet with whom he lived for three years, Louis MacNeice who became for a time a writing partner – mostly for the BBC overseas program, and H. A. L. Craig, the screenwriter who produced the script for the film Waterloo. Behan also found time to work in education, having been identified by the Strathclyde Region education dept as the "Writer in residence" for the Region's secondary schools. Behan enjoyed this role for more than five years, always expressing a conviction that the youth were worth investing in and the role with Strathclyde Region allowed him to reach out and help aspiring talent get recognition and encouragement.

Through relationships with various people in the music industry including Phil Solomon (one of the owners of Radio Caroline), Behan found himself to be often involved in helping performing artists (e.g. The Dubliners, David McWilliams, Christy Moore and many others) to develop their acts, establish an appreciation of stage craft and (especially so in the case of The Dubliners) write material. In this way, Behan made some long-lasting friendships that spanned musical genres and included friendships with Eric Burdon, Jimi Hendrix, Chas Chandler and many other artists.

=== Songwriting ===
Behan was a prolific composer and had more than 450 songs published during his lifetime. Many of his songs were very popular in Ireland and among the Irish living in Britain and elsewhere, especially "The Patriot Game", "McAlpine's Fusiliers" (originally written by Martin Henry but adapted by Behan), "Avondale", and "Liverpool Lou". In 1958, he released The Singing Streets: Childhood Memories of Ireland and Scotland on Folkways Records along with fellow folksinger Ewan MacColl with whom he collaborated for a number of years. Behan, who was unequivocal in the defence of his copyright, publicly accused Bob Dylan of plagiarising "The Patriot Game" in writing his own "With God on Our Side".

In 2009 The Patriot Game from Easter Week and After: Songs of the IRA originally issued by Topic in 1960 was included in their 70-year anniversary boxed set Three Score and Ten as track twenty-two on the third CD.

=== Pop culture references ===
Dave Cousins of the band Strawbs wrote his song "Josephine, for Better or for Worse" in honour of Josephine and Dominic Behan. This song has been recorded several times; the best-known version is on the album Dragonfly by Strawbs in 1970. Bob Dylan's 1963 song "With God on our Side" uses the melody and narrative framework of Behan's "The Patriot Game", as well as being influenced by its theme. The melody, as Behan admitted during a correspondence in The Guardian with Michael Grosvenor Myer, was actually derived and adapted from a version of the traditional song known as "The Nightingale", "The Grenadier and the Lady", "The Month of May", though had been significantly changed in both tempo and mood to serve the narrative of the song the Patriot Game.

The Liverpool folk/poetry band The Scaffold produced a version of Behan's song "Liverpool Lou" in 1974 which became a top 10 hit in the UK and spawned covers in various languages across Europe. On the original Scaffold pressing, the writing credits were incorrectly attributed to Paul McCartney who had produced the record on behalf of his brother Mike McGear; Behan advised the relevant authorities and had his rights to the song reinstated quickly receiving an apology from McCartney; Behan accepted McCartney's explanation that his mother had sung the song and he thought it was a traditional work. Later pressings of the song were then correctly credited to Behan; the early McCartney-labeled pressings are particularly rare and collectible.

In a well-publicised interview, John Lennon dismissed the 1960s folk scene in his own country, describing it as "College students with pints of beer going hay-nonny nonny" but in the same breath, he praised Behan, from neighbouring Ireland, whom he said he liked. On Desert Island Discs in 2007, Yoko Ono selected Behan's "Liverpool Lou" as her husband had sung it to their son as a lullaby.

Behan is discussed briefly in Bob Dylan's documentary film Dont Look Back but it is clear that the enmity between them was palpable. Behan held a number of artists in contempt, particularly when they changed the lyrics of his works to mitigate political embarrassment; for example Behan had a well-publicised spat with Liam Clancy whose recording of "The Patriot Game" omitted the verse in which Behan blamed Éamon de Valera for the long-term unrest in the six counties of Northern Ireland. Behan took the view that almost all of his work was written to make some form of social, historical or political statement and should either be used as an entire piece of work or not at all. The relationship between Behan and Clancy was never repaired.

=== Behan's death ===
Dominic Behan died at home in Glasgow, aged 60, on 3 August 1989 of complications arising from pancreatic cancer, shortly after the publication of his critically acclaimed novel The Public World of Parable Jones. He was survived by his widow Josephine and two sons, Fintan and Stephen. He was cremated in Glasgow and his ashes were scattered at the Royal Canal Dublin, near his birthplace, by May MacGiolla the wife of the Workers' Party Dublin West TD Tomás MacGiolla. His oration was given by his lifelong friend Seán Garland, general secretary of the Workers' Party of which Behan had been a staunch supporter for many years.

== Works ==
=== Plays ===
- Posterity Be Damned (1959)
- The Folk Singer (1969)
- Ireland Mother Ireland (1969)
- Tell Dublin I Miss Her (1998)

=== Books ===
- Teems of Times (1961)
- Tell Dublin I Miss Her (1961)
- My Brother Brendan (1965)
- Ireland Sings! (1966)
- The Singing Irish (1969)
- The Life and Times of Spike Milligan (1987)
- The Public World of Parable Jones (1988)
- The Catacombs (1989)

=== Discography ===
- 1 1958 Irish Songs (Recalled) 10" Topic 10T28
- 2 1958 The Singing Streets: Childhood Memories of Ireland and Scotland LP Folkways FW 8501 issued on Topic 12T41 in 1959 as 'Streets of Songs' (Ewan MacColl and Dominic Behan)
- 3 1958 Easter Monday, 1916 Songs of the I.R.A. (Irish Republican Army) LP Riverside 12-820 US release (Recorded Nov. 1957)
- 4 1959 Finnegan's Wake EP Collector JEI 1
- 5 1959 McCafferty EP Collector JEI 2
- 6 1959 Songs of the Street EP Collector JEI 3
- 7 1959 Mrs Holligan's Christmas Cake EP Collector JEI 4
- 8 1960 Finnegan's Wake & Other Irish Folk Songs LP Folk-Lyric FL 113 [This is a US release (Side A is Collector EPs JEI 1/2; Side B is Collector EPs JEI 3/4)]
- 9 1959 The Bells of Hell 7" Decca 45-F 11147
- 10 1959 Down by the Liffeyside LP Topic 12T35 w/ Peggy Seeger and Leon Rosselson
- 11 1960 The Irish Rover LP Folklore F-LEUT-2
- 12 1960 The Patriot Game 7" Topic STOP 115
- 13 1960 Easter Week And After: Songs of the IRA LP Topic 12T44 As Riverside LP, but drops 4 tracks. Add 4 different tracks.
- 14 1962 Cosmopolitan Man LP Folklore F-LEUT-4
- 15 1963 Peelers And Prisoners EP Topic TOP 85
- 16 1963 Irish Rebel Songs LP Ace of Clubs ACL-1136 Enoch Kent/Diarmuid O'Neill/Patrick O'Malley (O'Neill/O'Malley are Dominic Behan!)
- 17 1964 Dominic Takes The Floor EP Topic TOP 101
- 18 1964 Liverpool Lou – EP EP Piccadilly NEP 34040 EP
- 19 1964 Liverpool Lou – single 7" Piccadilly 7N.35172 #8 in Ireland in May 1964, #7 in UK in June 1974 for The Scaffold (Warners K 16400)
- 20 1964 When I'm Twenty 7" Piccadilly 7N.35198
- 21 1965 Arkle LP Marble Arch MAL 1123
- 22 1965 Ireland Sings LP Pye NPL 18134
- 23 1965 Folksound of Britain LP HMV CLP 1910 [Dominic Behan was MC for this live concert]
- 24 1966 Rebellion LP Pye NPL 18139
- 25 1967 Dominic Behan LP Major Minor MMLP6
- 26 1972 Unity Creates Strength LP Nevis NEV R007 one track – Connolly Was There plus Finale (all feature)
- 27 1975 A Better Class of Folk LP Lismor LILP 5022 with Mike Whellans, Iain MacKintosh, Billy Davidson & Allan Barty
- 28 2000 Sing Christmas & The Turn of the Year CD Rounder ROUN1850 one track with the Hollinwood Girls Choir (T'was Mary Conceived) year -1957

=== Songs ===
- "Arkle"
- "Avondale"
- "Building Up and Tearing England Down"
- "Come Out Ye Black and Tans"
- "Connolly Will Be There"
- "Dicey Reilly"
- "Hand me Down me Petticoat"
- "Liverpool Lou"
- "Maloney Wants a Drink"
- "McAlpine's Fusiliers"
- "The Merry Ploughboy"
- "Our Last Hope"
- "Paddy on the Road"
- "The Patriot Game"
- "The Sea Around Us"
- "Take It Down from the Mast"

=== Standalone poems ===
- "Bás, Fás, Blás"
