= Peter Sheridan =

Irish playwright and screenwriter

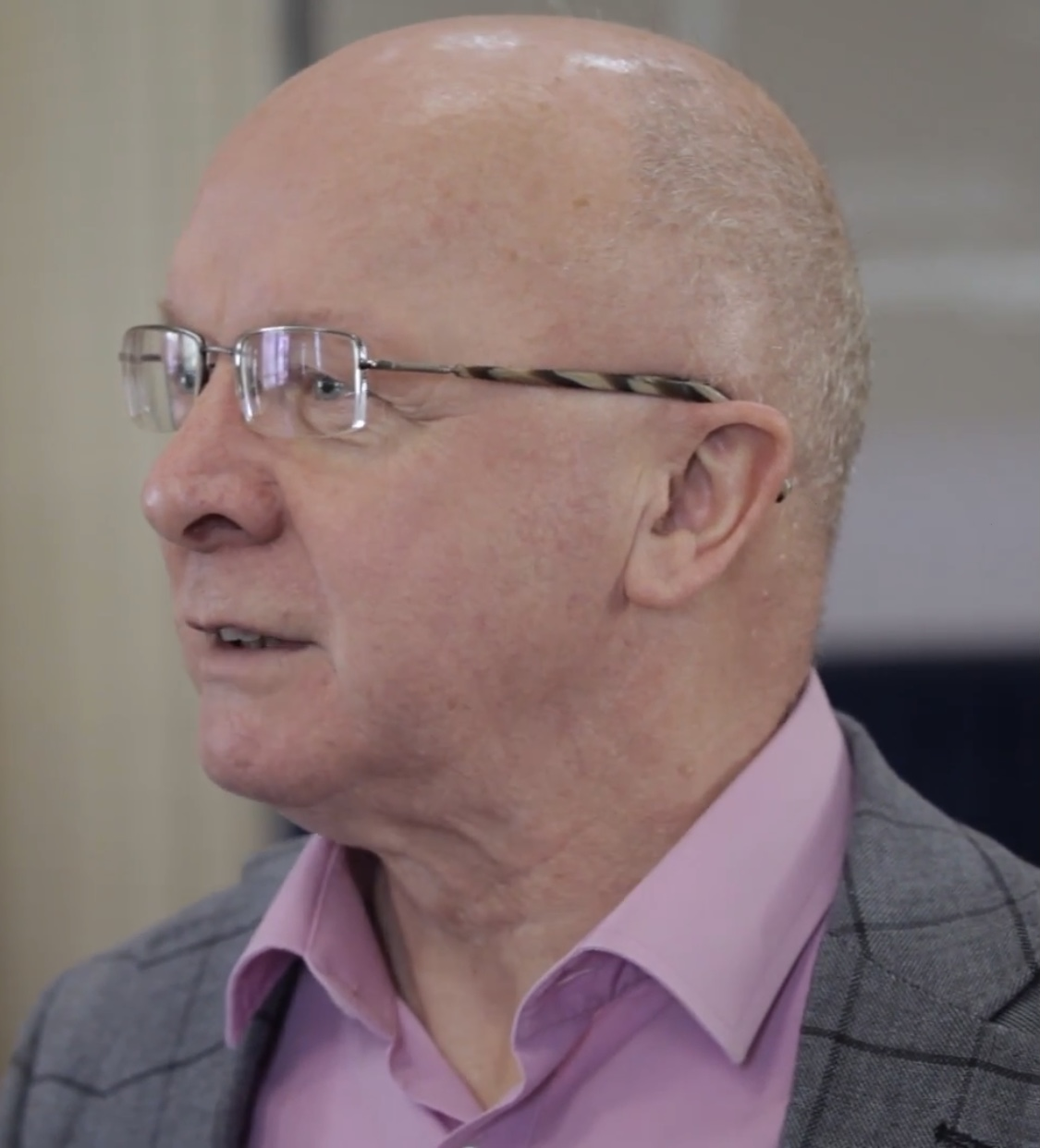
- Sheridan at the 2016 Dublin International Film Festival
- Born: January 1952 (age 74)
- Occupations: Writer, director
- Years active: 1970–present
- Relatives: Jim Sheridan (brother)

Peter Sheridan (born 1952) is an Irish playwright, screenwriter and director. He lives in Dublin. His awards include the Rooney Prize for Irish Literature in 1978. In 1980 he was writer-in-residence in the Abbey Theatre, Dublin, and his short film, The Breakfast, won several European awards. He wrote the pilot episode of Fair City. He wrote and directed the film Borstal Boy, which was released in 2002. He is the brother of the film director Jim Sheridan.

In 2017, he also appeared as a contestant on the British game show Countdown.

== Plays ==
- Diary of a Hunger Strike
- Emigrants
- Finders Keepers
- No Entry
- Children of Eve
- Paint It Black
- Shades of the Jelly Woman (Part One)
- The Liberty Suit
- The Rock and Roll Show
- Women at Work
- Are You Havin' a Laugh?
- Borstal Boy Playwright: Frank McMahon "Borstal Boy" was written by Brendan Behan

== Novels ==
- Every Inch of Her (Big Fat Love) (2003 & 2004)

=== Memoirs ===
- 44 (1999)
- Forty Seven Roses (2002)
- Break a Leg (2012)

== Sources ==
- Sheridan, Peter (1999). 44, Dublin Made Me. New York: Viking. ISBN 0-670-88514-2.
- Sheridan, Peter (2004). Every Inch of Her. New York: Penguin Books. ISBN 0-14-200434-0.
- Sheridan, Peter (2003). 47 Roses. New York: Penguin Books. ISBN 0-14-200286-0.
- "IMDb profile". IMDb.
- "Irish Playography". Archived from the original on 1 May 2007.
