= Brendan Behan =

Irish poet and writer (1923–1964)

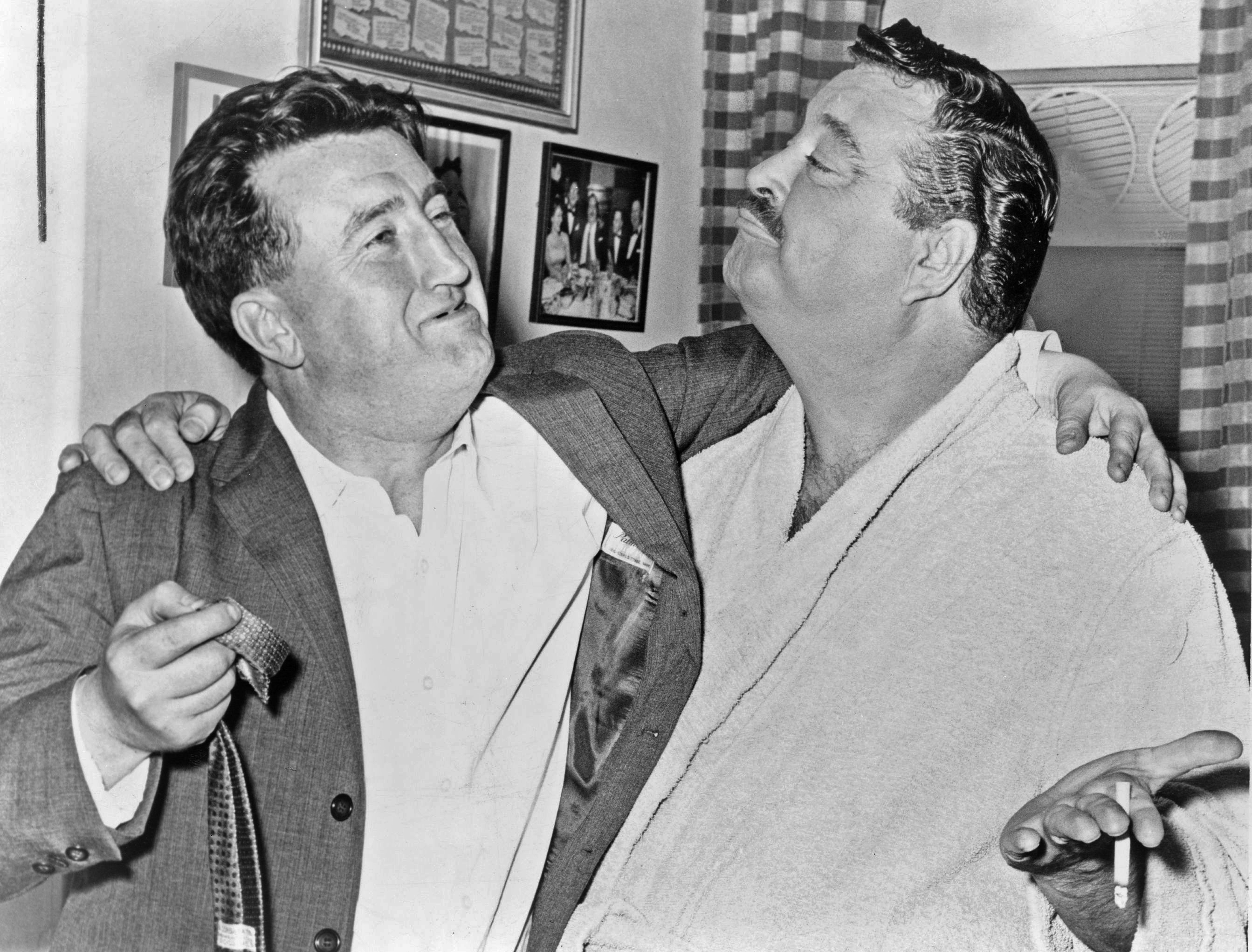
- Behan (left) with actor Jackie Gleason in 1960
- Born: Brendan Francis Aidan Behan; 9 February 1923; Dublin, Irish Free State
- Died: 20 March 1964 (aged 41); Dublin, Ireland
- Occupation: Writer
- Spouse: Beatrice Ffrench Salkeld (m. 1955)
- Children: 2
- Parent(s): Stephen Behan (father); Kathleen Behan (mother)
- Relatives: Dominic Behan (brother); Brian Behan (brother)
- Writing career
- Period: 1942–1964
- Genres: Poet, novelist, playwright
- Subjects: Irish republican struggle, often autobiographical
- Notable works: The Quare Fellow; The Hostage; Borstal Boy

Brendan Francis Aidan Behan (christened Francis Behan) (/ˈbiːən/ BEE-ən; Irish: Breandán Ó Beacháin; 9 February 1923 – 20 March 1964) was an Irish poet, short story writer, novelist, playwright, and Irish Republican, an activist who wrote in both English and Irish. His widely acknowledged alcohol dependence, despite attempts to treat it, impacted his creative capacities and contributed to health and social problems which curtailed his artistic output and finally his life. He is widely regarded as one of Ireland's greatest writers.

An Irish Republican and a volunteer in the Irish Republican Army (IRA), Behan was born in Dublin into a staunchly republican family, becoming a member of the IRA's youth organization Fianna Éireann at the age of fourteen. There was also a strong emphasis on Irish history and culture in his home, which meant he was steeped in literature and patriotic ballads from an early age. At the age of 16, Behan joined the IRA, which led to his serving time in a borstal youth prison in the United Kingdom and imprisonment in Ireland. During this time, he took it upon himself to study and became a fluent speaker of the Irish language. Subsequently released from prison as part of a general amnesty given by the Fianna Fáil government in 1946, Behan moved between homes in Dublin, Kerry and Connemara and also resided in Paris for a time.

In 1954, Behan's first play, The Quare Fellow, was produced in Dublin. It was well received; however, it was the 1956 production at Joan Littlewood's Theatre Workshop in Stratford, London, that gained Behan a wider reputation. This was helped by a famous drunken interview on BBC television with Malcolm Muggeridge. In 1958, Behan's play in the Irish language, An Giall had its debut at Dublin's Damer Theatre. Later, The Hostage, Behan's English-language adaptation of An Giall, met with great success internationally. Behan's autobiographical novel, Borstal Boy, was published the same year and became a worldwide best-seller.

By the early 1960s, Behan reached the peak of his fame. He spent increasing amounts of time in New York City, famously declaring, "To America, my new found land: The man that hates you hates the human race." By this point, Behan began spending time with various prominent people such as Harpo Marx and Arthur Miller and was followed by a young Bob Dylan. However, this newfound fame did nothing to aid his health or his work, with his alcohol dependence and diabetic conditions continuing to deteriorate. Brendan Behan's New York and Confessions of an Irish Rebel received little praise. He briefly attempted to combat this by a dry stretch while staying at the Chelsea Hotel in New York, and in 1961 was admitted to Sunnyside Private Hospital, an institution for the treatment of alcohol dependence in Toronto, but he once again turned back to alcohol and relapsed back into active alcohol use.

== Early life ==
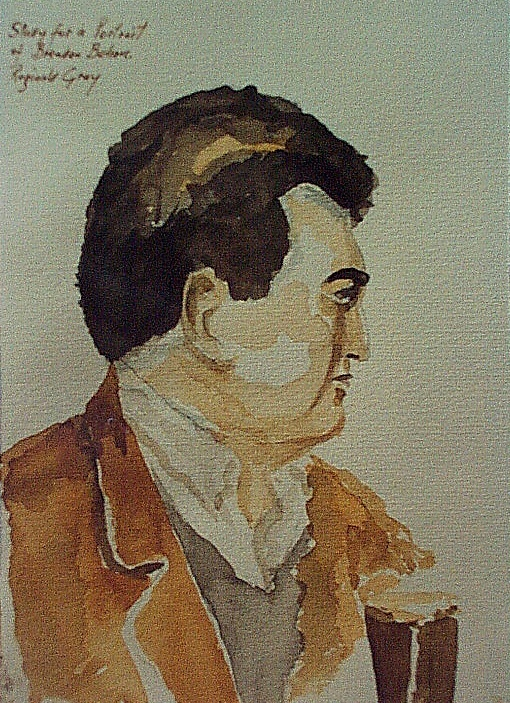
Study from life of Brendan Behan by Reginald Gray, 1953 (Egg tempera on wood panel)

Behan was born in the inner city of Dublin at Holles Street Hospital on 9 February 1923 into an educated working-class family.

His mother, Kathleen Behan, née Kearney, had two sons, Sean Furlong and Rory (Roger Casement Furlong), from her first marriage to compositor Jack Furlong; after Brendan was born she had three more sons and a daughter: Seamus, Brian, Dominic, and Carmel.

They first lived in a house on Russell Street near Mountjoy Square owned by his grandmother, Christine English, who owned a number of properties in the area. Brendan's father Stephen Behan, a house painter who had fought in the War of Independence, read classic literature to the children at bedtime including the works of Zola, Galsworthy, and Maupassant; their mother Kathleen took them on literary tours of the city. She remained politically active all her life and was a personal friend of the Irish leader Michael Collins. Kathleen published her autobiography, Mother of All The Behans, a collaboration with her son Brian, in 1984.

Brendan Behan wrote a lament to Collins, "The Laughing Boy", at the age of thirteen. The title was from the affectionate nickname Mrs Behan gave to Collins.

Behan's uncle Peadar Kearney wrote "The Soldier's Song", which became the Irish national anthem Amhrán na bhFiann when translated into Irish. His brother Dominic was also a songwriter, best known for the song "The Patriot Game"; His brother Brian was a prominent radical political activist and public speaker, actor, author, and playwright.

Biographer Ulick O'Connor wrote that one day, aged eight, Brendan was returning home with his granny and a friend from a pub. A passer-by remarked, "Oh, my! Isn't it terrible, ma'am, to see such a beautiful child deformed?" "How dare you", joked his granny. "He's not deformed; he's just drunk!"

In 1937, the Behan family moved to a newly-built local council housing scheme in Kildare Road, Crumlin, then seen by Dubliners as the countryside – Stephen muttered that the working classes were being sent "To Hell or to Kimmage" a parody of Oliver Cromwell's demand that the Irish be sent "To Hell or to Connacht". At this stage, Behan left school at 13 to enter an apprenticeship to follow in his father's and both grandfathers' footsteps as a house painter.

== IRA activities ==
Behan became a member of Fianna Éireann, the boy scout group of the Anti-Treaty IRA. He published his first poems and prose in the organisation's magazine, Fianna: the Voice of Young Ireland. In 1931 he also became the youngest contributor to be published in The Irish Press with his poem "Reply of Young Boy to Pro-English verses".

At 16, Behan joined the IRA and embarked on an unauthorised solo mission to England to set off a bomb at Cammell Laird shipyard. He was arrested while in possession of explosives. British prosecutors tried to persuade him to testify against his IRA superiors and offered in return to relocate him under a new name to Canada or another distant part of the British Commonwealth.

Refusing to be turned, the 16-year-old Behan was sentenced to three years in a borstal (Hollesley Bay, once under the care of Cyril Joyce) and did not return to Ireland until 1941. He wrote about the experience in the memoir Borstal Boy.

In 1942, during the wartime state of emergency declared by Irish Taoiseach Éamon de Valera, Behan was arrested by the Garda Síochána following a protest against the execution of IRA man George Plant Later that same year Behan was arrested at another commemoration, which the IRA had planned to take place during a Dublin commemoration ceremony for Theobald Wolfe Tone. When the group of IRA men were confronted by the police, one member pointed his revolver at them but did not fire. Behan urged him to "use it, use it"; when no shot was fired, Behan shouted: "Give it to me and I will shoot the bastards". When Behan received the gun he fired two shots at police and escaped the scene but was later arrested (10 April 1942). He was put on trial for conspiracy to murder and the attempted murder of two Garda detectives, Behan was found guilty and sentenced to 14 years' imprisonment.

He was first incarcerated in Mountjoy Prison in Dublin, where he sketched out his play The Quare Fellow, based on a fellow prisoner. In June 1944, Behan was interned both with other IRA men and with Allied and German airmen at the Curragh Camp in County Kildare. He later related his experiences there in his memoir Confessions of an Irish Rebel. Released under a general amnesty for IRA prisoners and internees in 1946, Behan's active IRA career was largely over by the age of 23. Aside from a short prison sentence in 1947 for trying to break an imprisoned IRA man out of prison in Manchester, Behan effectively left the organisation but remained friends with the IRA's long-term Chief of Staff Cathal Goulding.

== Writer ==
Behan's prison experiences were central to his writing career. In Mountjoy, he wrote his first play, The Rent Woman, act one of which was recently discovered in the archives of the National Library of Ireland, along with acts 2 and 3 of an Irish language version of the play, An bhean ciosa the Irish for Rent Woman. It was here he also began to write short stories and other prose. It was a literary magazine called Envoy (A Review of Literature and Art), founded by John Ryan, that first published Behan's short stories and his first poem. Some of his early work was also published in The Bell, the leading Irish literary magazine of the time. He learned Irish in prison and began writing plays. In late 2024 Dublin playwright Jimmy Murphy discovered act 1 of a lost first play by Behan, The Rent Woman in the Archives of the National Library of Ireland, alongside Behan's handwritten acts 2 and 3 of a play in Irish called An Bean Ciósa, a direct translation of The Rent Woman. After his release in 1946, he spent some time in the Gaeltacht areas of counties Galway and Kerry, where he started writing poetry in Irish.

During this period he was employed by the Commissioners of Irish Lights, where the lighthouse keeper of Saint John's Point, County Down, recommending his dismissal, described him as "the worst specimen" he had met in 30 years of service, adding that he showed "careless indifference" and "no respect for property".

He left Ireland and all its perceived social pressures to live in Paris in the early 1950s. There, he felt he could lose himself and release the artist within. Although he still drank heavily, he managed to earn a living, supposedly by writing pornography. He returned to Dublin and began to write seriously, and to be published in serious papers such as The Irish Times, for which he wrote In 1953, drawing on his extensive knowledge of criminal activity in Dublin and Paris, he wrote a serial that was later published as The Scarperer.

Throughout the rest of his writing career, he would rise at seven in the morning and work until noon, when the pubs opened. He began to write for radio, and his play The Leaving Party was broadcast. Literary Ireland in the 1950s was a place where people drank. Behan cultivated a reputation as carouser-in-chief and swayed shoulder-to-shoulder with other literati of the day who used the pub McDaid's as their base: Flann O'Brien, Patrick Kavanagh, Patrick Swift, Anthony Cronin, John Jordan, J. P. Donleavy and artist Desmond MacNamara whose bust of Behan is on display at the National Writers Museum. Behan fell out with the spiky Kavanagh, who reportedly would visibly shudder at the mention of Behan's name and who referred to him as "evil incarnate".

Behan's fortunes changed in 1954, with the appearance of his play The Quare Fellow. Originally called The Twisting of Another Rope and influenced by his time spent in jail, it chronicles the vicissitudes of prison life leading up to the execution of "the quare fellow", a character who is never seen. The prison dialogue is vivid and laced with satire but reveals to the reader the human detritus that surrounds capital punishment. Produced in the Pike Theatre, in Dublin, the play ran for six months. In May 1956, The Quare Fellow opened in the Theatre Royal Stratford East, in a production by Joan Littlewood's Theatre Workshop. Subsequently, it transferred to the West End. Behan generated immense publicity for The Quare Fellow as a result of a drunken appearance on the Malcolm Muggeridge TV show. The English, relatively unaccustomed to public drunkenness in authors, took him to their hearts. A fellow guest on the show, Irish-American actor Jackie Gleason, reportedly said about the incident: "It wasn't an act of God, but an act of Guinness!" Behan and Gleason went on to forge a friendship. Behan loved the story of how, walking along the street in London shortly after this episode, a Cockney approached him and exclaimed that he understood every word he had said—drunk or not—but had not a clue what "that bugger Muggeridge was on about!" While addled, Behan would clamber on stage and recite the play's signature song, "The Auld Triangle". The transfer of the play to Broadway provided Behan with international recognition. Rumours still abound that Littlewood contributed much of the text of The Quare Fellow and led to the saying, "Dylan Thomas wrote Under Milk Wood, Brendan Behan wrote under Littlewood". Littlewood remained a supporter, visiting him in Dublin in 1960.

In 1958, his Irish-language play An Giall (The Hostage) opened in the Damer Theatre, Dublin. Reminiscent of Frank O'Connor's Guests of the Nation, it portrays the detention in a teeming Dublin house in the late 1950s of a British conscript soldier, seized by the IRA as a hostage pending the scheduled execution in Northern Ireland of an imprisoned IRA volunteer. The hostage falls in love with an Irish convent girl, Teresa, working as a maid in the house. Their innocent world of love is incongruous among their surroundings since the house also serves as a brothel. In the end, the hostage dies accidentally during a bungled police raid, revealing the human cost of war, a universal suffering. The subsequent English-language version The Hostage (1958), reflecting Behan's own translation from the Irish but also much influenced by Joan Littlewood during a troubled collaboration with Behan, is a bawdy, slapstick play that adds a number of flamboyantly gay characters and bears only a limited resemblance to the original version.

His autobiographical novel Borstal Boy followed in 1958. In the vivid memoir of his time in St Andrews House, Hollesley Bay Colony Borstal, near Woodbridge, Suffolk, England. (The site of St Andrews House is now a Category D men's prison and Young Offenders Institution). An original voice in Irish literature boomed out from its pages. The language is both acerbic and delicate, the portrayal of inmates and "screws" cerebral. For a Republican, though, it is not a vitriolic attack on Britain; it delineates Behan's move away from violence. In one account, an inmate strives to entice Behan into chanting political slogans with him. Behan curses and damns him in his mind, hoping that he would cease his rantings-hardly the sign of a troublesome prisoner. By the end, the idealistic boy rebel emerges as a realistic young man, who recognises the truth: violence, especially political violence, is futile. The 1950s literary critic Kenneth Tynan said: "If the English hoard words like misers... Behan sends them out on a spree, ribald, flushed, and spoiling for a fight." He was now established as one of the leading Irish writers of his generation.

Behan revered the memory of Father William Doyle, a Dublin priest of the Society of Jesus, who served as military chaplain to the Royal Dublin Fusiliers as they fought in the trenches of the Western Front. Father Doyle was killed in action while running to the aid of wounded soldiers from his regiment during the Battle of Passchendaele in 1917. Behan expressed his affection for Father Doyle's memory in the memoir Borstal Boy. Alfred O'Rahilly's 1920 biography of the fallen chaplain was one of Behan's favourite books.

== Personal life ==
In February 1955, Behan married horticultural illustrator for The Irish Times, Beatrice Ffrench Salkeld, daughter of the painter Cecil Ffrench Salkeld. A daughter, Blanaid, was born in 1963, shortly before Behan's death. Various biographies have established that Behan was bisexual to some degree.

Behan had a one-night stand in 1961 with Valerie Danby-Smith, who was Ernest Hemingway's personal assistant. (Note: Gloria Hemingway was transgender and presented as male at the time of the marriage.) Nine months later, Valerie gave birth to a son she named Brendan. Brendan Behan died two years later, having never met his son.

"In 2022 the American writer and feminist activist Letty Cottin Pogrebin claimed that Brian’s brother Brendan had tried to rape her in his room at the Chelsea Hotel in New York. This was in 1962, when she was a publicist for his US publisher. According to Shanda: A Memoir of Shame and Secrecy, Brendan threatened to smash a window in the hotel reception if he did not accompany her to his room, after which “he grabbed me, slammed the door behind us, and threw me on the bed … Suddenly I was on my back, and he was on top of me, thrusting, groping, stinking, sickening me with his sharp soured breath. I resisted with all the force I could muster.”

"Pogrebin says she did not report the incident at the time, partly for fear of damaging her career. She now regrets that decision, although she is sure “Brendan would have retaliated with some scurrilous accusation that undoubtedly would have sullied my reputation more than his”. Her allegations have been ignored by most of the Irish media. In an email to [Rosemarry Hill] in 2024, Pogrebin described Brendan as a “devious devil who wore the cloak of an Irish charmer”."

== Decline and death ==
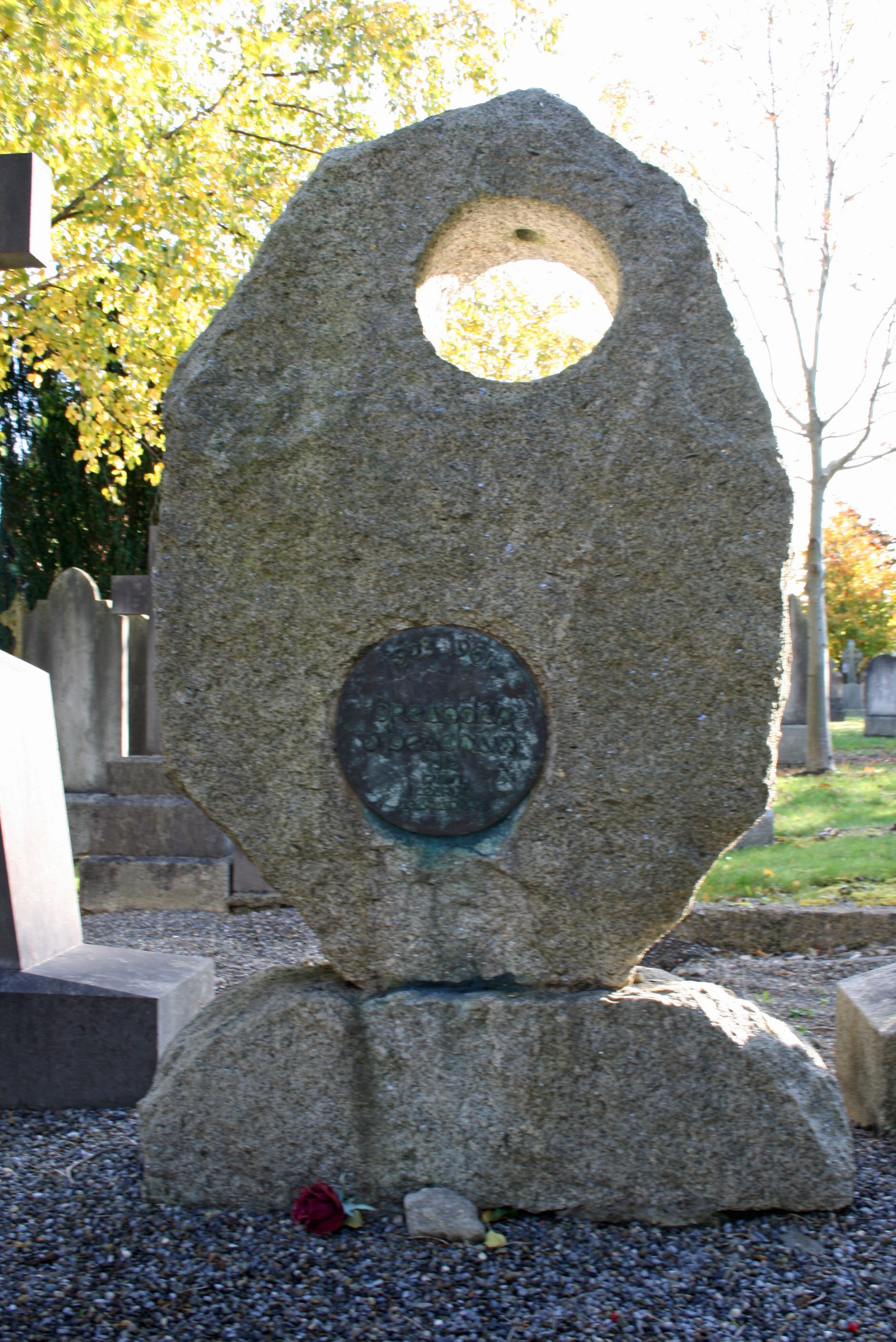
Grave of Brendan Behan by Clíodhna Cussen, Glasnevin, Dublin. A bronze likeness of Brendan's face was stolen from the vacant opening in 1984. It was restored in 2014.

Behan found fame difficult. He was a long-term heavy drinker, describing himself, on one occasion, as "a drinker with a writing problem" and claiming "I only drink on two occasions—when I'm thirsty and when I'm not" and developed diabetes in the early 1950s but this was not diagnosed until 1956. As his fame grew, so too did his alcohol addiction. This combination resulted in a series of famously drunken public appearances, on both stage and television. Behan's favourite drink was champagne and sherry.

The public wanted the witty, iconoclastic, genial "broth of a boy", and he gave that to them in abundance, once exclaiming: "There's no bad publicity except an obituary." His health suffered, with diabetic comas and seizures occurring regularly. The public who once extended their arms now closed ranks against him; publicans flung him from their premises. His books, Brendan Behan's Island, Brendan Behan's New York and Confessions of an Irish Rebel, published in 1962 and 1964, were dictated into a tape recorder because he was no longer able to write or type for long enough to be able to finish them.

Behan died on 20 March 1964 after collapsing at the Harbour Lights bar (now Harkin's Harbour Bar) in Echlin Street, Dublin. He was transferred to the Meath Hospital in central Dublin, where he died, aged 41. At his funeral, he was given a full IRA guard of honour, which escorted his coffin. It was described by several newspapers as the biggest Irish funeral of all time after those of Michael Collins and Charles Stewart Parnell.

Acclaimed Irish sculptor James Power sculpted Brendan Behan's death mask.

Following his death, his widow had a son, Paudge Behan, with Cathal Goulding, Chief of Staff of the Irish Republican Army and the Official IRA.

== In popular culture ==
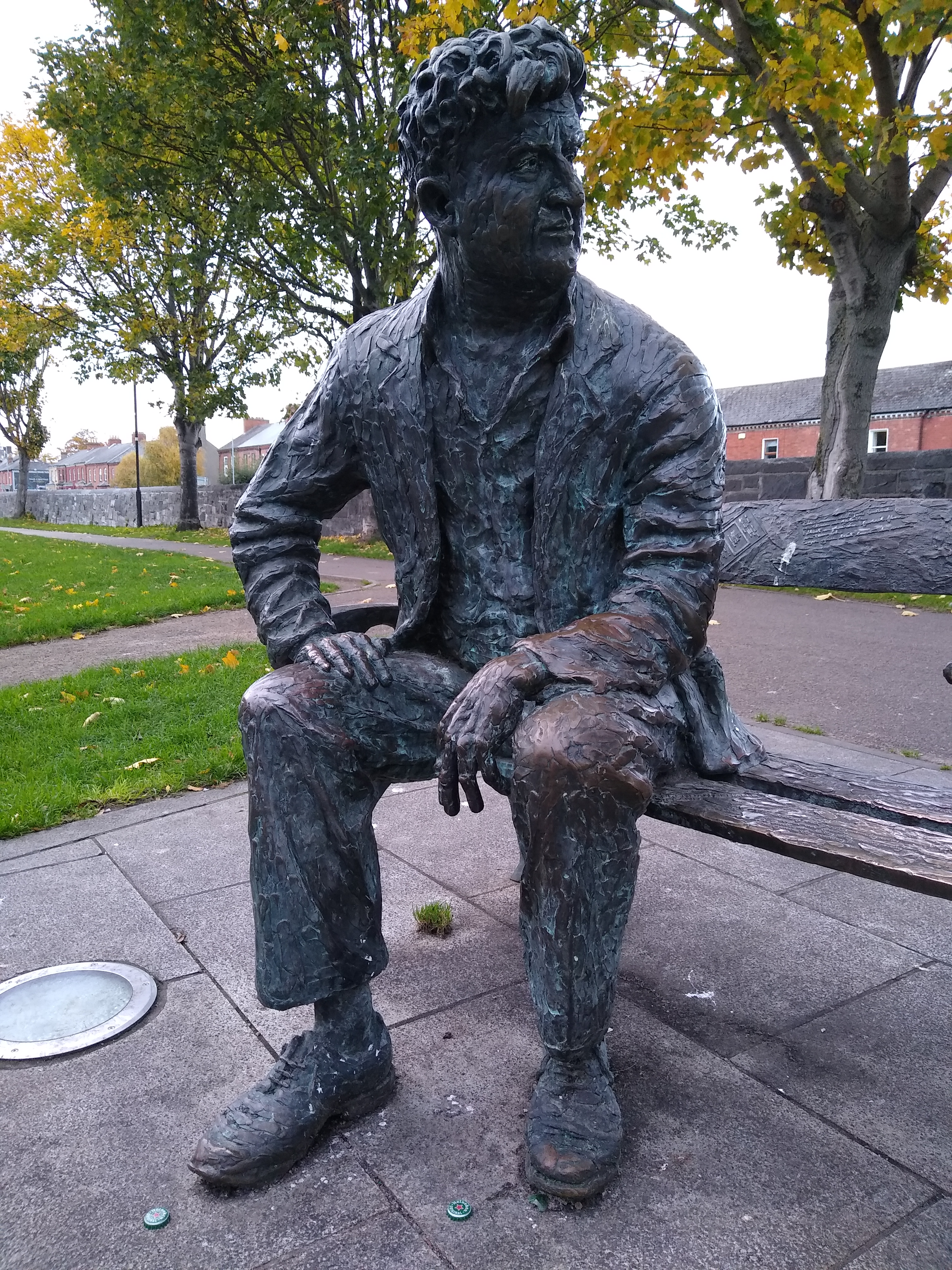
Statue of Behan in Dublin Sculpted by John Coll

Behan is frequently mentioned in works of popular culture. His work has been a significant influence in the writings of Shane MacGowan, and he is the subject of Streams of Whiskey, a song by The Pogues. The Pogues' Thousands Are Sailing written by lead guitarist Philip Chevron, features the lyric and in Brendan Behan's footsteps / I danced up and down the street. Behan is also referenced in Damien Dempsey's 'Jar Song'. Behan's version of the third verse of The Internationale, from Borstal Boy was reproduced on the LP sleeve of Dexys Midnight Runners's debut album, Searching for the Young Soul Rebels.

He was named by the US website Irish Central as one of the greatest Irish writers of all time.

Australian singer-songwriter Paul Kelly wrote Laughing Boy as a tribute to Behan, and it was covered by Weddings, Parties, Anything on their Roaring Days album. The Mighty Mighty Bosstones 2000 album Pay Attention features the song All Things Considered, which contains the lyrics Most of what he tells us no one's verified / He swears he was there the day that Brendan Behan died.

Behan is referenced in Thinking Voyager 2 Type Things, a song from the 1990 Bob Geldof album, Vegetarians of Love, with the lyrics So rise up Brendan Behan and like a drunken Lazarus / Let's traipse the high bronze of the evening sky like crack crazed kings.

Chicago-based band The Tossers wrote the song Breandan Ó Beacháin, released on their 2008 album On A Fine Spring Evening. Shortly after Behan's death a student, Fred Geis, wrote the song Lament for Brendan Behan and passed it on to the Clancy Brothers, who sang it on their album Recorded Live in Ireland the same year. This song, which calls "bold Brendan" Ireland's "sweet angry singer", was later covered by the Australian trio The Doug Anthony All Stars, better known as a comedy band, on their album Blue. Brendan is Seamus Robinson's song tribute to Behan. Behan's prison song The Auld Triangle (which featured in his play The Quare Fellow —this term being prison slang for a prisoner condemned to be hanged), has become a standard and has been recorded on numerous occasions by folk musicians as well as popular bands such as The Pogues, The Dubliners, the Dropkick Murphys and The Doug Anthony All Stars. Behan is also referenced in the opening line of the Mountain Goats song Commandante, where the narrator proclaims that he will "drink more whiskey than Brendan Behan".

Behan's two poems from his work The Hostage, On the Eighteenth Day of November and The Laughing Boy were translated into Swedish and recorded by Ann Sofi Nilsson on the album När kommer dagen. The same poems were translated in 1966 to Greek and recorded by Maria Farantouri on the album Ένας όμηρος (The hostage) by Mikis Theodorakis.

Irish actor Shay Duffin wrote and performed a one-person show in which he portrayed Behan.

A pub named after Behan is located in the Jamaica Plain section of Boston, Massachusetts. A bronze sculpture of the writer sits on the banks of the Royal Canal, while a bronze of Behan's head sits inside Searson's bar, one of his watering holes, on Pembroke Road, Dublin.

According to J.P. Donleavy's History of The Ginger Man, Behan was instrumental in bringing Donleavy in contact with M. Girodios of Olympia Press (Paris) to help Donleavy's first novel, The Ginger Man, be published despite its having been ostracised by the world literature community for its "filth" and "obscenity".

In the season 4 Mad Men episode Blowing Smoke, which premiered on 10 October 2010, Midge Daniels introduces Don to her playwright husband, Perry, and says, "When we met, I said he looked like Brendan Behan."

In May 2011, Brendan at the Chelsea, written by Behan's niece Janet Behan, was the first play performed in the Naughton Studio at the new Lyric Theatre in Belfast. The production tells the story of Behan's residence at New York's Hotel Chelsea in 1963. It was a critical success and is being revived for a tour to Theatre Row in New York in September 2013 before returning to the Lyric in October 2013.

Morrissey's 2014 song Mountjoy references the writer: Brendan Behan's laughter rings / For what he had or hadn't done / For he knew then as I know now / That for each and every one of us / We all lose / Rich or poor, / We all lose / Rich or poor, they all lose.

In 1959, on the Album Songs for Swingin' Sellers, Peter Sellers parodies Behan's TV interviews in the sketch 'In a Free State' - an interview with Mr Bedham, an Irish playwright who is "slurred, angry, panting and ready to commit murder to get at a drink". According to the journalist William J. Weatherby, Behan's wife admired Sellers' impersonation of her husband and considered Bedham's references to "the thirst" the most accurate part of the sketch. The Sketch was written by Max Schreiner with music by Ron Goodwin.

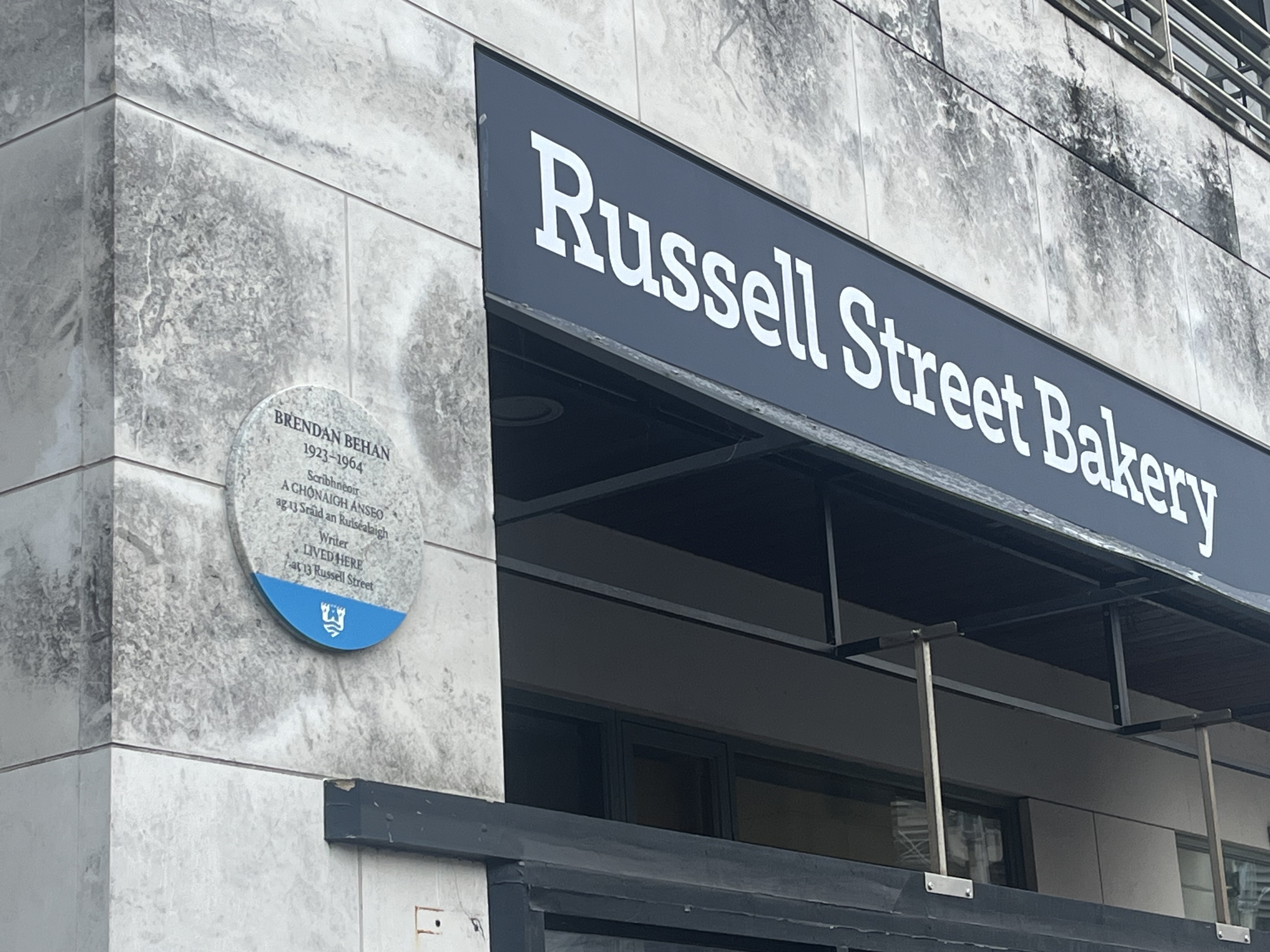
A plaque unveiled on the current building on 13 Russell Street, Dublin on Feb 7th 2026 commemorating writer Brendan Behan, who lived there.

In 2026, a plaque was unveiled in commemorating Behan on Russell Street.

== Works ==
=== Plays ===
- The Quare Fellow (1954)
- An Giall (The Hostage) (1958)
  - Behan wrote the play in Irish and translated it to English.
- Richard's Cork Leg (1972)
- Moving Out (one-act play, commissioned for radio)
- A Garden Party (one-act play, commissioned for radio)
- The Big House (1957, one-act play, commissioned for radio)

=== Books ===
- Borstal Boy (1958)
- Brendan Behan's Island (1962)
- Hold Your Hour and Have Another (1963)
- Brendan Behan's New York (1964)
- Confessions of an Irish Rebel (1965)
- The Scarperer (1963)
- After The Wake: Twenty-One Prose Works Including Previously Unpublished Material (posthumous – 1981)

=== Music ===
- Brendan Behan Sings Irish Folksongs and Ballads Spoken Arts Records SAC760 (1985)
- The Captains and the Kings

=== Biographies ===
- Brendan Behan – A Life by Michael O'Sullivan
- My Brother Brendan by Dominic Behan
- Brendan Behan by Ulick O'Connor
- The Brothers Behan by Brian Behan
- With Brendan Behan by Peter Arthurs
- The Crazy Life of Brendan Behan: The Rise and Fall of Dublin's Laughing Boy by Frank Gray
- My Life with Brendan by Beatrice Behan
- Brendan Behan, Man and Showman by Rae Jeffs
