= Borstal Boy =

Memoir/bildungsroman by Brendan Behan

- Author: Brendan Behan
- Language: English
- Genre: Drama
- Publisher: Hutchinson
- Publication date: 1958
- Publication place: Ireland
- Media type: Print Hardcover
- Pages: 342 pp (first edition)
- OCLC: 185635608

Borstal Boy is a 1958 autobiographical book by Brendan Behan. The story depicts a young, fervently idealistic Behan, who loses his naïveté over the three years of his sentence to a juvenile borstal, softening his radical Irish republican stance and warming to his British fellow prisoners.

The book was banned in Ireland for unspecified reasons in 1958; the ban expired in 1970.

The book was reissued by David R. Godine in 2000.

== Adaptations ==
In 1967, the story debuted as a play, adapted by Frank McMahon and staged at the Abbey Theatre in Dublin, with Frank Grimes as the young Behan. The play was a great success, winning McMahon a Tony Award for his adaptation. The play remains popular with both Irish and American audiences.

A film adaptation, Borstal Boy, was released in 2000, directed by Peter Sheridan and starring Shawn Hatosy and Danny Dyer. The Irish band Hothouse Flowers' song "The End of the Road" appeared in the soundtrack of the movie.

== Cultural references ==
In 1973, the English rock band The Faces recorded a song about the book, which was included on their album Ooh La La.

The British electropop group Chew Lips take their name from a character in the book.
