= Radical Club =

Artistic and literary club in Dublin (1925–1927)

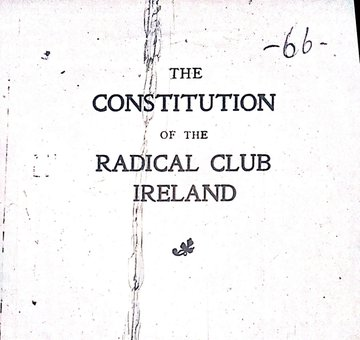
The Radical Club's constitution

The Radical Club was formed in Dublin, Ireland in the 1925 by Liam O'Flaherty. The group held meetings and exhibitions, and ceased activity by 1930.

== History ==
The Radical Club was founded by Liam O'Flaherty with a circle of artistic and literary figures in Dublin in 1925. O'Flaherty with Cecil Ffrench Salkeld sent out invitations proposing this new club and its inaugural meeting during the summer of 1925. It adopted its constitution in October 1925 with F. R. Higgins as its first chair. The group was composed of artists, poets, and writers who met weekly for conversations, meetings and other events. The Club's stated aims were "to provide a centre of intercourse for Irish intellectual workers; to encourage all forms of progressive cultural activity in Ireland; to fight for the freedom of cultural expression in Ireland; to promote solidarity among artists, writers, scientists, and all people engaged in intellectual pursuits in Ireland". In the beginning the Club was organised into 3 sections, art, literature, and social. Co-founding members with O'Flaherty included Austin Clarke, Brinsley MacNamara, Padraig Ó Conaire, and Francis Stuart.

A number of artists were also involved, including Harry Kernoff, Maurice MacGonigal, and Patrick Tuohy. A wider circle of artists exhibited with the Club, such as Margaret Clarke, Paul Henry, Seán Keating, May Guinness, Norah McGuinness, Albert Power, Nano Reid, Oliver Sheppard, and Jack B. Yeats. The inaugural exhibition was opened by W. B. Yeats in May 1926 at Daniel Egan's gallery, which received mixed reviews. This gallery at 38 St Stephen's Green appears to have hosted a variety of the Club's events and exhibitions. Exhibitions were held under the name Radical Painters' Group, a subgroup of the Club of which Patrick Trench served as secretary. Desirée "Toto" Bannard-Cogley produced the Club's cabarets. Other events actively patronised by the Club members included Irish language classes, lectures, ceilidhe, art classes, and journalism.

The Club's activities appear to have gone into decline in 1927, with some activity among the members for a period after this. Rosamund Jacob recorded the activities of the Club in her diary, with her mentions of the Club ending in 1926, but events are recorded into 1927. The group does not have a recorded date of dissolution.
