= Paudge Behan =

Irish actor and writer

- Born: Paudge Rodger Behan; 18 January 1965 (age 61); Dublin, Ireland
- Occupations: Actor; writer
- Years active: 1991–present
- Parents: Cathal Goulding (father); Beatrice Behan (mother)
- Relatives: Cecil Ffrench Salkeld (grandfather); Blanaid Salkeld (great-grandmother)

Paudge Rodger Behan (/ˈpɔːdʒ ˈbiːən/ PAWJ BEE-ən; born 18 January 1965) is an Irish actor and writer. Behan worked briefly as a journalist for a Dublin newspaper before turning to acting. After a series of minor film and television roles in the 1990s, he was handpicked by English novelist Barbara Taylor Bradford to appear as the male lead in a 1999 dramatisation of her book A Secret Affair (1996).

Behan has also appeared in the feature films A Man of No Importance (1994), Conspiracy of Silence (2003) and Veronica Guerin (2003), and has taken leading roles in two short films, A Lonely Sky (2006) and Wake Up (2007).

== Early life ==
Behan was born on 18 January 1965 in Dublin to Cathal Goulding, an Irish republican, socialist and IRA Chief of Staff, and Beatrice Behan, an artist, memoirist and widow of Brendan Behan. (Note: "Goulding's career included many years as IRA chief of staff, many more seeking to break into politics, and an exotic love-life which included having a son by Behan's widow": David McKittrick (29 December 1998), "Obituary: Cathal Goulding", The Independent . In her memoirs, Beatrice Behan omitted to mention that Paudge was her biological son. She wrote, "Life in my house hasn't changed much, except that Blanaid, now a frail, brown-haired girl with a gift for drawing, has a brother, Paudge, a fair-haired boy I adopted, who makes a good companion for her": My Life with Brendan, p. 250. A photograph of Blanaid and Paudge as children with their pet rabbit Sneachta in their garden in Dublin appears as illustration 47 on p. 224 of the book. In December 2003, Paudge Behan expressed unhappiness that the Taoiseach, Bertie Ahern, had officiated at the unveiling of a statue to Brendan Behan at the Royal Canal in Dublin. When asked to say a few words after the Taoiseach's address, Behan addressed Ahern directly, saying: "There is nobody further removed from Behan's spirit than yourself." He later explained that his family had not been consulted about who would attend the event in an official capacity and he had not been pleased at the Taoiseach's attendance. "What has Bertie Ahern in common with Brendan Behan, other than they are both Irish? When you see what is happening with the fat cats in this country, with Bertie Ahern and his Government, I can't think of anyone further from the spirit of Brendan Behan. Shannon being used as an American air base for waging war on another country, was that in the spirit of Brendan Behan?": Olivia Kelly (9 December 2003), "Ahern incurs wrath of Paudge Behan", The Irish Times (reproduced on Indymedia Ireland)) Behan has three paternal half–siblings and one maternal half-sister. Through his mother, Behan is the grandson of the artist Cecil Ffrench Salkeld and the great-grandson of the poet and actor Blanaid Salkeld.

Behan grew up alongside his maternal half-sister at 5 Anglesea Road, a red-brick, semi-detached late Victorian house in Ballsbridge, Dublin, which Brendan Behan bought for his wife Beatrice in 1959 for IR£1,400. The house came into Paudge Behan's ownership, and he sold it reluctantly for €1.65 million in February 2006. As a teenager, Goulding was involved with the IRA youth wing Fianna Éireann.

== Education and career ==
Before turning to acting, Behan had a brief career in journalism in Ireland: "I interviewed everyone from priests to prostitutes before my Dublin paper folded." Behan was also involved in theatre work – he was a costume assistant during the original production of Tom Murphy's adaptation of Liam O'Flaherty's 1925 novel The Informer on 13 October 1981 at the Olympia Theatre in Dublin. He participated in various other plays in Dublin, but finding them "all very over the top, very amateurish, full of people turning up drunk or not turning up at all", he decided to leave Ireland and pursue art studies in Berlin.

However, Behan found he could not concentrate on his art in Germany as he was working too hard in the evenings in nightclubs and bars to earn money. Also, as he was doing "too much drinking as well, so unless I wanted to start a new art style where it would've been very 'shakey' [sic] to look at, basically I decided I had to do something else". He resolved to go to London to study acting. After applying to three drama schools he was accepted by the Royal Academy of Dramatic Art (RADA). For about three years from 1990 or 1991, he lived with his friends from RADA, David Harewood and Danny Cerqueira, at 39 Ravenshaw Street in West Hampstead. Harewood recalls that his housemates were "fantastic characters" – "It was a wonderful, experimental time. We'd spend long nights discussing art, life and politics; smoking weed, drinking lots of whisky, listening to music and throwing furniture on the fire."

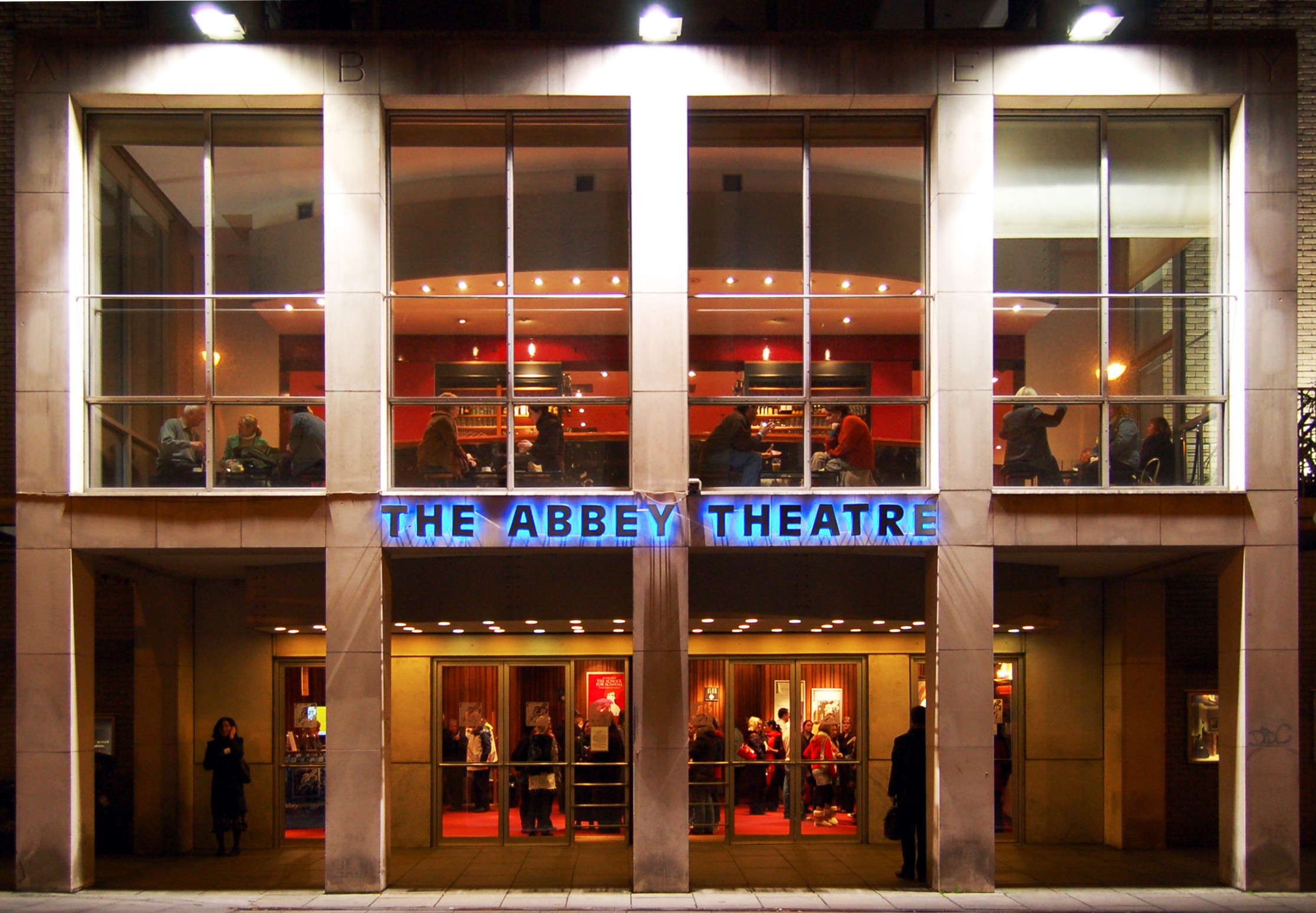
The Abbey Theatre in Dublin, Ireland, as it appeared on 20 November 2006.

On 15 May 1991 at Dublin's Abbey Theatre, Behan played the lead character Connolly in the original production of Tom Murphy's play The Patriot Game, which charted the events of the Easter Rising of 1916. He also acted as a thug in the comedy film London Kills Me (1991); and made an appearance in the TV film Anglo-Saxon Attitudes (1992), based on the 1956 satirical novel by Angus Wilson. Other TV roles included characters in episodes of Highlander: The Series (1995) and The New Adventures of Robin Hood (1997). He was subsequently handpicked by English novelist Barbara Taylor Bradford to be the male protagonist of the made-for-television film A Secret Affair (1999), based on her 1996 book. In the film, which gained him a large and enthusiastic female following, he starred as Bill Fitzgerald, a war correspondent who falls in love with and pursues Vanessa Stewart (Janine Turner) in Venice although she is engaged, and who is subsequently kidnapped in a war zone.

Other films in which Behan appeared include A Man of No Importance (1994), Conspiracy of Silence (2003) and Veronica Guerin (2003). In the latter film, he played Brian Meehan, who was convicted of murdering Irish crime journalist Veronica Guerin in 1996. In 2006, he appeared in Nick Ryan's short film A Lonely Sky as Jack Reilly, a test pilot who risks his life to break the sound barrier in 1947, but who is forced to question his reasons and abilities by a strange yet familiar man. The ten-minute film won Best Film (Production and Post-Production) at the Digital Media Awards in Dublin in February 2007. Behan appeared in the short film Wake Up (2007), in which he played the lead character Nathan. The film is the first 20 minutes of a proposed feature film. Most recently, Behan has appeared in the fifth season of the Irish crime drama series Love/Hate (2010). He played the role of Terence May, an Irish drugs supplier based in Spain.

Concerning acting, Behan has been quoted as saying "this is a good business when it's working, but when it's not, it's awful".

== 2008 police investigation ==
On 12 July 2008, Behan was questioned by the Carabinieri (Italian military police) in connection with the murder of a 72-year-old woman, Silvana Abate Francescatti, at her home on Monte Amiata, Arcidosso, in Grosseto, Tuscany, Italy. The woman was found on 11 July with 13 stab wounds, including a fatal throat wound, but was believed to have died the previous day. Behan, who had been resident in Arcidosso for part of the year since 2006, was arrested after seeking treatment twice at a hospital near Arcidosso for a cut on his thigh. In an interview with The Irish Times, he claimed he had first gone to the hospital on 10 July after cutting himself in the thigh while unpacking furniture and other objects delivered from the USA. However, hospital staff had mistakenly decided he had been acting suspiciously due to his poor spoken Italian, and the fact that he had expressed annoyance at how the hospital was managed and its bad signage.

Upon returning to the hospital on 12 July for a tetanus injection, Behan was arrested by five policemen and taken to their Arcidosso barracks for questioning. He did not know what was happening at first as the police had no interpreter in the barracks. He was only provided with a lawyer and interpreter 15 hours later when a magistrate from Grosseto came. Behan exercised his right not to answer questions. He was released, but was formally informed that he was under suspicion. As of 15 July 2008 he was the only suspect in the case. The police subsequently seized his car and a knife from his home, and secured a room in the house in which traces of blood were allegedly found. In addition, shoe prints found were said to have matched his footwear. Custody of his car and home (except for the cellar) were returned to him on 14 July by the judge overseeing the investigation.

Speaking on Italian television, Behan denied knowing the victim and maintained his innocence, saying "I've got nothing to hide." He accused the police of subjecting him to "psychological torture" during his detention and threatened to sue them.

In November 2008, Behan was cleared of the crime and allowed full use of his home after a chef named Aldo Staiani was identified as the murderer from DNA retrieved from under Mrs. Abate's fingernails. Behan said, "I don't hold any animosity. It's done now, there is no point in bearing any grudges. I am just glad somebody has finally been caught for this brutal killing."

== Selected work ==
=== Film ===
Year(s) of appearance	Film	Role	Awards and nominations
1991	London Kills Me	White thug at party	
1994	Uncovered	Domenec	
1994	A Man of No Importance	Kitty	
1996	Snakes and Ladders	Dan	
2001	Bye Bye Inkhead (short film)	[Unnamed cast member]	
2003	Conspiracy of Silence	Niall	
2003	Veronica Guerin	Brian Meehan	
2006	A Lonely Sky (short film)	Jack Reilly	
2007	Wake Up (short film)	Nathan	

Some information in this table was obtained from Paudge Behan: Filmography, IMDb.

=== Television ===
Year(s) of appearance	Film or series	Role	Awards and nominations
1992	Anglo-Saxon Attitudes	Larrie Rourke	
1995 (1 episode)	Highlander: The Series (1992–1998) "Reasonable Doubt"	Lucas Kagan	
1997 (1 episode)	The New Adventures of Robin Hood (1997–1998) "Your Land is My Land"	Dan	
1998	Close Relations	Todd	
1999	A Secret Affair	Bill Fitzgerald	
2014	Love/Hate	Terrence May	
2016	Stan Lee's Lucky Man	Nelson	

Some information in this table was obtained from Paudge Behan: Filmography, IMDb.

=== Theatre ===
Year(s) of appearance	Production	Role	Awards and nominations
1991	The Patriot Game (1991) by Tom Murphy Abbey Theatre, Dublin, Ireland	Connolly	

== Personal life ==
In addition to his half-sister Blanaid, Paudge Behan has one older half-brother, Cathal Óg (the son of Cathal Goulding and Patty Germaine who married in 1950), and a younger half-brother Aodhgan and half-sister Banbán.
