= Harry Kernoff =

Irish painter (1900–1974)

- Kernoff in the 1920s
- Born: Harry Aaron Kernoff; 9 January 1900; London, England
- Died: 25 December 1974 (aged 74); Meath Hospital, Dublin, Ireland
- Education: Dublin Metropolitan School of Art
- Known for: painter

Harry Aaron Kernoff (9 January 1900 – 25 December 1974) was an Irish genre-painter. He depicted Dublin street and pub scenes and Dublin landmarks, as well as producing landscapes, woodcut illustrations, portraits, and set designs.

== Early life and education ==
Harry Aaron Kernoff was born in London on 9 January 1900. His parents were Isaac and Katherine Kernoff (née Bardanelle). His father was Russian and worked as a furniture maker, and his mother was from an old Spanish-Jewish family. Kernoff served as an apprentice cabinet maker with his father and attended a London primary school. He showed an early interest in art. The family moved to Dublin in May 1914, and Kernoff enrolled for night classes at the Dublin Metropolitan School of Art. In 1923, Kernoff won the Taylor scholarship and became a full-time day student.

== Career ==
Kernoff was influenced by Seán Keating, Patrick Tuohy, and Maurice MacGonigal. He painted the Irish landscape, genre scenes, and portraits. He was particularly interested in drawing streetscapes, buildings and people of Dublin. He is noted for his awareness of the effect of unemployment in Dublin, which he documented in paintings such as Dublin kitchen (1923). From 1926, he exhibited with the Royal Hibernian Academy, continuing to do so until his death and being elected a member in 1936. His studio was based at Stamer Street, Dublin, from where he painted portraits of leading literary and theatre figures, including Brendan Behan, Hilton Edwards, F. R. Higgins, James Joyce, Flann O'Brien, Sean O'Casey, and W. B. Yeats. Kernoff preferred to finish his portraits in a single sitting and was a prolific painter. From 1926 to 1958, he held an annual solo show in Dublin. Kernoff was a member of the Studio Art Club and the Radical Club. Kernoff executed the decorative design of the Little Theatre in South William Street, Dublin. He was the set designer for Sean O'Casey's The shadow of a gunman and Lord Dunsany's The glittering gate.

His work was part of the painting event in the art competition at the 1928 Summer Olympics. Kernoff was a member of the Friends of Soviet Russia, with his woodcuts used to illustrate labour and republican newspapers throughout the 1930s and 1940s. He also designed the masthead of The Irish Workers' Voice. In 1930, Kernoff visited Leningrad and Moscow with the Friends of Soviet Russia. He was actively involved in anti-fascist campaigns in Dublin. Kernoff visited Paris in 1931, where he exhibited Metro, Paris, and Place de Tertre. In the same year, he had a one-man show at Gieve's Gallery, London, exhibiting Ukraine peasant. He was one of the illustrators of the Cuala Press A Broadside second and third series in 1935 and 1937.

He developed an interest in modernism and the avant-garde movement in the 1920s, but returned to realism for his works documenting social life in both rural and urban Irish settings. He frequented the Palace Bar on Fleet Street and would trawl Dublin pubs looking for more portrait subjects. Kernoff exhibited at two world fairs, Glasgow in 1938, and New York in 1939. From the 1940s onwards, Kernoff favoured small canvases, painting miniature oils in the hundreds. He published his first book of woodcuts in 1942, followed up with A storyteller's childhood in 1946. He was among the Irish artists featured at the contemporary Irish art exhibition at Aberystwyth, Wales, in 1953. Kernoff travelled to Nova Scotia in 1957, spending a year painting there. He exhibited watercolours in Lugano, Italy, and Toronto, Canada, in 1964 and 1965. Four of his portraits of W. B. Yeats were exhibited as part of the National Gallery of Ireland Yeats centenary exhibition in 1965. He sat on the arts advisory committee of the Municipal Gallery of Modern Art for a number of years. He was elected a life member of the United Arts Club, Dublin, in 1974.

== Death and legacy ==
Kernoff died on 25 December 1974 in Meath Hospital, Dublin. The National Library of Ireland hold his papers, which were deposited by his sister, Lena Kernoff, in 1975.

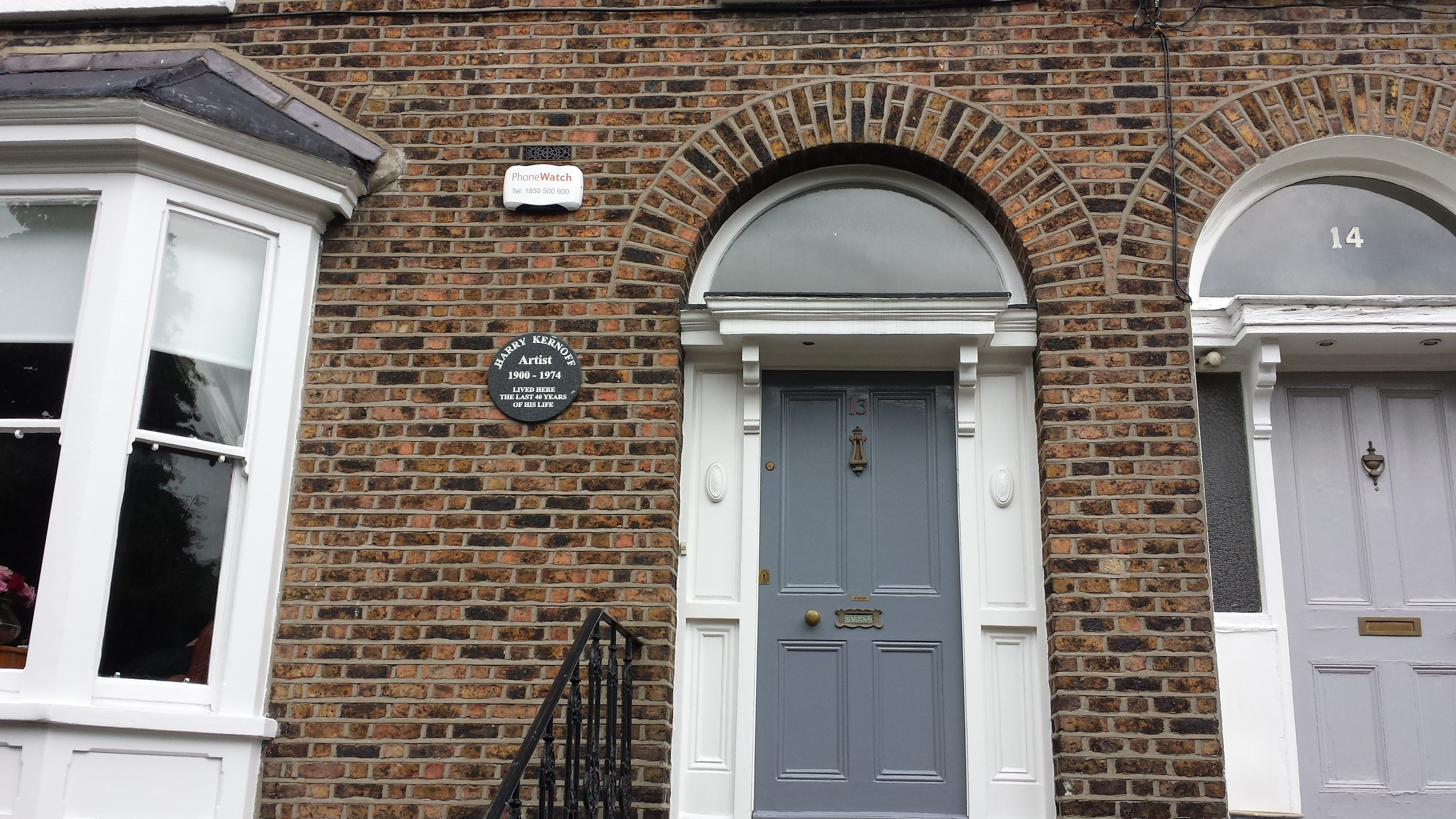
Kernoff's home at 13 Stamer Street

Kernoff's work has been stylistically compared with L. S. Lowry, with John Ryan describing him as "our Boswell in paint".

It has been suggested that Kernoff's painting, A Bird Never Flew on One Wing, was the inspiration for the ears of the character Spock in the original Star Trek television series. The painting hung in O'Brien's pub, Leeson Street, where it is believed a Hollywood designer saw it, though this story may be apocryphal. The painting sold in 2008 for €180,000.
