= Abbey Experimental Theatre Company =

Theatre company in Dublin, Ireland

The Abbey Experimental Theatre Company was a small company run by a group of young actors associated with the Peacock Theatre in the Abbey Theatre, Dublin, Ireland.

== History ==
The Abbey Experimental Theatre Company opened on 5 April 1937, founded by actress Ria Mooney. Mooney's founding statement for the Experimental Theatre was: "for the production of plays by Irish authors whose work was considered not suitable or not sufficiently advanced technically for production on the Abbey stage, and yet was of sufficiently high standard to merit public presentation." The inaugural play was Mervyn Wall's Alarm Among the Clerks.

The Experimental Theatre was considered to be non-commercial, and had a limited audience. By virtue of its experimental nature, it staged plays that would have not been produced in Ireland otherwise. Following the fire in the Abbey in 1951, no provision was made for the Experimental Theatre in the plans or funding for the new Abbey building.

== Alarm Among the Clerks ==
Alarm Among the Clerks was a play written by Mervyn Wall and directed by Cecil F. Ford. It was first performed on Monday, 5 April 1937, and performed as part of a double bill with The Phoenix. "The action is laid in a room in Slattery's bank and a local public house. The first act, in the bank, portrays office life quite well...the came the experiment. In the green light the audience was transported back to the office...the ending was rather everly contrived."

=== Synopsis ===
A play about the deadly tedium of day-to-day life for employees in a bank. The clerks complain to each other about 'the system' meaning both capitalism and their own particular bank's ethos. They retire to the local pub for a drink and inebriation conjures up a dream version of banking life to be played out after the realism of the opening.

=== Cast ===
- Cecil Barror - Mr Plus
- Victor Boyd - Publican
- Brian Carey - Mr Finn
- Frank Carney - Mr Selskar
- Malachi Keegan - Mr Mullin
- Dermot Kelly - Street Singer
- Michael Kinsella - Harkin
- John McDarby - Mr Doody
- Austin Meldon - Mr Ireton
- Geroid Ó'hÍceadha - Mr Fox
- Anne Potter - Miss Noone
- Shela Ward - Miss Boyd

=== Crew ===
- Cecil F. Ford - Director
- Malachi Keegan - Stage Manager
- Geroid Ó'hÍceadha - Set Construction and Set Designer
- Anne Yeats - Costume Designer and Scenic Painting

== The Phoenix ==
The Phoenix is a play written by Nino Bartholomew, it was first performed in the Peacock, directed by Frank Carney, on Monday, 5 April 1937 as a double bill with Alarm Among the Clerks. The production ran for 6 nights. "There was little good about it except Mr Cecil Barror's portrayal of Oliver Goldsmith... There was too much rough and tumble (the stage is too small for it) and the combination of comedy and tragedy in the young student's life is not too good."

=== Cast ===
- Cecil Barror - Oliver Goldsmith
- Brian Carey - Dr. Theaker Wilder
- Áine Cox - Catty Kiernan
- Cecil F. Ford - Edward Mills
- Dermot Kelly - O'Reilly
- Austin Meldon - Jack Beatty
- Mary O'Neill - Peggy O'Shaughnessy

=== Crew ===
- Malachi Keegan - Stage Manager
- Dermot Kelly - Assistant Stage Manager
- Geroid Ó'hÍceadha - Carpenter Set Designer
- Anne Yeats - Costume Designer and Scenic Artist

== Harlequin's Positions ==
Harlequin's Positions is a play written by Jack B. Yeats, and first performed Monday, 5 June 1939. The production ran for 6 nights. It was co-directed by members of the acting company, Ria Mooney and Cecil F. Ford. The script of Harlequin's Positions was long presumed lost. The Irish Times reported in 1966 that an Oxford academic had finally located the missing typescript with the help of the artist's niece, Anne Yeats. A handwritten script is currently held as part of the Jack B. Yeats Collection in the archives of NUI Galway.

=== Synopsis ===
Rumours of war force a wealthy heiress to cut short her cruise and introduce tension and disquiet to a small Sligo town, it is set in the fictional town of Portnadroleen, County Sligo.

=== Cast ===
- Victor Boyd - First Pilot
- Wilfred Brambell - Alfred Clonboise
- Finbarr Howard - Boy
- Dermot Kelly - Second Porter
- Michael Kinsella - First Porter
- Sheila Maguire - Claire Gillane
- John McDarby - Second Pilot
- Evelyn McNiece - Madame Rose Bosanquet
- Moira McSwiggan - Kate
- Robert Mooney - Johnnie Gillane
- Geroid Ó'hÍceadha - Guard
- Sarah O'Kelly - Apple Woman
- Anne Potter - Annie Jennings

=== Crew ===
- Ria Mooney - Director
- Cecil F. Ford - Director
- John Mc Darby - Stage Manager
- Michael Kinsella - Assistant Stage Manager
- Anne Yeats - Scenic Artist and Set Designer
- Geroid Ó'hÍceadha - Carpenter

== The Wild Cat (1940) ==
The Wild Cat is a three act play by Gerard Malone, set in the kitchen and living room of the bungalow house of the Moynan Family. First performed by the Abbey Experimental Theatre on Sunday, 18 February 1940. It was produced by Lennox Robinson.

=== Cast ===
- Shela Ward - Mrs Moynan
- Sheila Carty - Molly
- Colm Hogan - Martin
- Austin Meldon - Hugh
- Cecil Ford - Allan
- Josephine Fitzgerald - Mrs Fintan
- Kitty Ryan - Betty
- Sheila Maguire - Nurse Brown

=== Crew ===
- Robert mooney - Stage Manager
- Evelyn McNiece - Assistant Stage Manager
- Anne Yeats - Settings Designer
- Desmond Leslie - Scenic Painter
- John McDarby - Set Constructor

== Cavaliero (The Life of a Hawk) ==
Cavaliero (The Life of a Hawk) is a play by Terence Smith directed by H.L. Morrow. It was first performed on Monday, 25 October 1948 alongside two other plays, The Briery Gap and Light Falling.

=== Cast ===
- Raghnall Breathnach - Dinny
- Eamonn Guaillí - His Honour

=== Crew ===
- H.L. Morrow - Director
- Anne Yeats - Set Designer

== Members of The Theatre ==
=== Patrons ===
- Lennox Robinson
- Dr Walter Starkie
- Dr Richard Hayes
- Ernest Blythe
- F. R. Higgins

=== Committee ===
- Ria Mooney
- Josephine Fitzgerald
- Evelyn McNiece
- Anne Porter
- Shela Ward
- Cecil F. Ford
- John McDarby

=== Hon. Secretaries ===
- Anne Potter
- Moira McSwiggan

=== Business Managers ===
- P. H. Considine
- Cecil F. Ford

=== Treasurers ===
- Josephine Fitzgerald
- Shela Ward
