= Seán O'Sullivan (painter) =

Irish artist

- Born: 20 June 1906; Dublin, Ireland
- Died: 3 May 1964 (aged 57); Dublin, Ireland

Seán O'Sullivan RHA (20 June 1906 – 3 May 1964) was an Irish painter and designer. He was one of the leading Irish artists of his time, known for his portraits and stamp designs.

== Early life and family ==
O'Sullivan was educated at Synge Street CBS in Dublin and went on to study drawing at the Dublin Metropolitan School of Art. Here, came to the attention of headmaster George Atkinson who arranged a three-month placement for him to study lithography at the Central School of Arts and Crafts in London.

While in London, O'Sullivan met Anglo Dutch painter Renée Mouw, whom he soon married. The pair studied in Paris before moving to Dublin. The couple had two daughters, Julian O'Sullivan and Terry Myler. Myler is a book illustratorHe studied painting in Paris at Colarossi's and La Grande Chaumiere. While in Paris, O'Sullivan "became friendly with James Joyce, Thomas McGreevy, and Samuel Beckett"

He stood at more than six feet and was "a good boxer, a fencer, a squash player and an enthusiastic sailor. He was also a keen reader and was fluent in both Irish and French."

== Career ==
He began exhibiting at the Royal Hibernian Academy (RHA) in 1926, at the age of 20, contributing an average of six paintings a year until his death. Primarily a portrait painter, O'Sullivan composed works featuring many of the leading political and cultural figures in Ireland, including Éamon de Valera, Douglas Hyde, W B Yeats, and James Joyce. In 1928 he became the youngest ever associate member of the Royal Hibernian Academy at the age of 22. He designed the cover for the Capuchin Annual in 1930. His work was also part of the painting event in the art competition at the 1932 Summer Olympics.

He was on friendly terms with many of Ireland’s best-known writers, actors, poets and painters including Sean Keating, Hilda Van Stockum, Maurice MacGonigal, Harry Kernoff, Patrick Kavanagh, Myles na gCopaleen, F.R. Higgins and John Ryan.

=== Design work ===
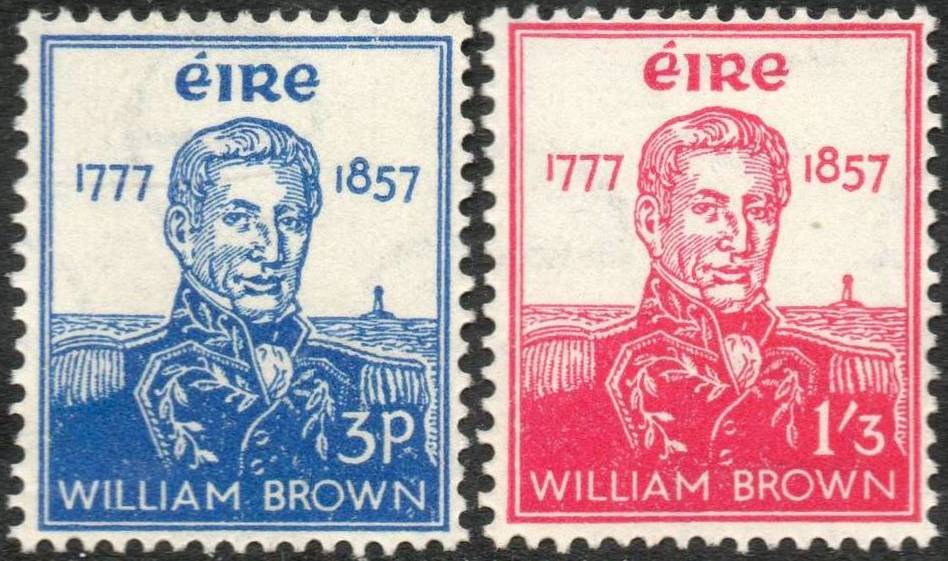
William Brown stamps by O'Sullivan

In 1932 the Saorstát Eireann Official Handbook was published as record of Cumann na nGaedheal’s years in government, which included a multitude of O'Sullivan's illustrations.

Following this, the novel An Béal Bocht, published originally in Irish by Flann O'Brien in 1941, includes an "Irish map of the world" drawn by O'Sullivan. In the map, O'Sullivan purposefully only marked places that were considered significant at the time. In his rendition of Ireland, he included places such as Sligo Jail, travel routes to Scotland, and deposits of illegal alcohol. The United States was glossed over with only the cities of New York, Boston, and Springfield being noted, and England's only significant detail was the mention of Irish playwright George Bernard Shaw. This was done for comedic effect.

O'Sullivan also designed the cover illustration for the volume of poems, Earth fire, by Valentin Iremonger, and 8 comedy illustrations for M.J. MacManus and his book entitled So this is Dubin!.

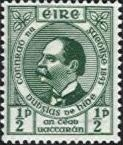
O'Sullivan's depiction of Douglas Hyde on 1943 a stamp

O'Sullivan designed stations of the cross for the Church of the Little Flower in Ballingtogher, County Sligo in 1933, murals depicting a west Ireland wedding for the Murals Bar in Tullamore, County Offaly in 1942, and murals for Our Lady of Lourdes Hospital in Drogheda in 1958. Throughout the 1950s he also painted many south and west Ireland landscapes for a private collector, one of his most popular examples being 'Lough Gill', a 1953 painting which is currently being held at the Irish Museum of Modern Art.

Between 1943 and 1957 O'Sullivan designed commemorative stamps for the Irish Post Office. He created commemorative stamps which depicted his paintings of Douglas Hyde and Sir William Rowan Hamilton in 1943, Edmund Ignatius Rice in 1944, and in 1966 O'Sullivan's paintings of the seven signatories of the Irish proclamation, Éamonn Ceannt, James Connolly, Joseph Plunkett, Patrick Pearse, Seán MacDiarmada, Thomas MacDonagh and Tom Clarke, were featured on stamps produced by An Post.

=== Criticism ===
As well as the leading figures in Irish life, O' Sullivan was employed in painting many of the leading Irish doctors for hospital portraits. Critics Eoin O'Brien and J.D.H. Widdess describe his later work as "en masse, a monotonous row of images, while individually they are often excellent character studies delicately drawn" Indeed his "proficiency at capturing life" was one of the hallmarks of his work. Despite this, O'Sullivan's services and paintings were still in high demand towards the latter years of his career. O' Sullivan's "tasteful drawings record not just the doctors, but nearly all well known Irishmen in the 1930's and 1940's." In 1946, an invitation from the 1st Battalion Dublin Brigade featured a photograph of an original O’Sullivan oil painting of Commandant Tom Byrne who was the last surviving Irish officer who had served in the Boer War.

== Later life and death ==
O’Sullivan never retired, and suffered a stroke at the age of 58, in April 1964 while working on a portrait of the abbot of Mt St Joseph in County Tipperary. He later died in the same year on the 3 May 1964 in Nenagh general hospital. O'Sullivan's body was carried to St Teresa's Church, Clarendon Street for his funeral, and buried in Deans Grange Cemetery, Dun Laoghaire, Dublin.

O'Sullivan's name was the last featured in the 1964 RHA catalogue, and his death was commemorated at the opening of the May 1964 RHA annual exhibition, which was attended by his friends and peers. Several members of the RHA gave speeches related personal anecdotes to the crowd about O'Sullivan. Taoiseach, Seán Lemass, several government ministers, and the Ambassador for the Netherlands also attended the event. The Irish Times article covering this event describes O'Sullivan as a "big, double bass-voiced artist who had a dual genius – for unequalled draughtsmanship and for living."

== Legacy ==
One of his most notable works, his portrait of the former President of Ireland, Éamon De Valera, is on display in Áras an Uachtaráin. Many of his portraits and sketches have since been sold at private auctions, with paintings like 'The Man and Woman of the West' (1929) selling for €65,000 in 2008. In 2012, Adams Auctioneers of Dublin held a sale for their collection of O'Sullivan's work.

Much of O'Sullivan's work continues to be exhibited and held in archives at the National Gallery of Ireland (NGI) in Dublin. O'Sullivan's portraits held in the NGI include those of Jack Butler Yeats, James Larkin and Maude Gonne. A number of his works are also held in private archives in the National Folklore Collection in University College Dublin. His documentation of prominent Irish cultural, political and social figures of the early to mid-20th century makes up a significant part of his collection of works.

O'Sullivan has credited with assisting the preservation of the culture and heritage of the Great Blasket Island. His 1958 portrait of Peig Sayers is a part of the archive of The Blasket Foundation, dedicated to the conservation of the historical community and culture of the island, which is no longer inhabited. O'Sullivan's sketch portrait entitled 'A Blasket Islander' (1932) depicts an elderly islander, sold at auction for €3,800 in 2021.
