= Circle of Deceit =

Circle of Deceit may refer to:

- Circle of Deceit (1981 film), German film
- Circle of Deceit (1998 film), American TV film
- Circles of Deceit, British television thriller series
