= Dara Ó Conaola =

Irish writer

- Born: Republic of Ireland
- Occupation: Writer
- Known for: Mo Chathair Ghríobháin
- Children: Lasairfhíona (singer)

Dara Ó Conaola (born 1945 in Inishmaan) is an Irish writer who writes in Irish. His first book of short stories, Mo Chathair Ghríobháin, was published in 1981. A later short book of eight short stories, translated to English by Gabriel Rosenstock, was published as Night Ructions in 1990. The book was launched at the 1990 Sunday Times Festival of Literature, Hay-on-Wye, Wales.

== Early life and work ==
Born on Inishmaan to a fisherman and housewife, Ó Conaola trained in the 1960s as a craftsman and woodwork teacher, his subsequent travels including Galway and Dublin, where he met his wife, Pacella, from a family of artists including Albert Power and May Power. She having trained at The Grafton Academy of Fashion Design in Dublin, they settled on Inisheer and raised their four children. The eldest, their only daughter, is the singer Lasairfhíona. On Inisheer, having taken over his deceased uncle's house and land, they ran it as a craft shop producing, amongst other things, traditional red Aran skirts and shawls.

== Writing ==
In 1992, Ó Conaola's novella Misiún ar Muir/Sea Mission was first published in 1992 by Ceard Shiopa Inis Oírr Teo., Inishere, Aran Islands, County Galway. A second edition was published in 2000 written in Irish and translated to English by Gabriel Rosenstock. It had been staged at An Taibhdhearc as part of the Galway Arts Festival in 1992 and at the Expo ‘92 in Spain. His work has been translated into English, German, French, Croatian, and Romanian, while the short story, Amuigh Liom Féin, is on the Irish Leaving Certificate curriculum.

He participated in the Cúirt International Festival of Literature in 2002. Two songs by him are included on his daughter Lasairfhíona's debut album.

== Bibliography ==
- Cuairt ar Oileáin Árann/Guide to the Aran Islands, published annually since 1978 by Ceardshiopa Inis Oírr Teo.
- An Gaiscíoch Beag, An Gúm, 1979
- Mo Chathair Ghríobháin, An Gúm, 1981
- Cor in Aghaidh an Chaim, Ceardshiopa Inis Oírr Teo, 1983.
- Amuigh Liom Féin, Ceardshiopa Inis Oírr Teo, 1988
- An Teachín Ceann Tuí/Thatched Homes of the Aran Islands, Ceardshiopa Inis Oírr Teo, 1988
- Night Ructions, Forrest Books, London & Cló Iar-Chonnachta, Co. na Gaillimhe, 1990. Second edition, 1999.
- Misiún ar Muir/Sea Mission, An Ceardshiopa Inis Oírr Teo, 1992. Second edition, 2000 ISBN 0-9538673-2-3.
- Saol agus Saothar Albert Power, Ceardshiopa Inis Oírr Teo, 1996
