= Lasairfhíona =

- Born: c. 1977 (age 47–48)
- Genres: Celtic, folk
- Occupation(s): Singer songwriter
- Years active: 2002–present
- Website: Official Myspace site

Lasairfhíona Ní Chonaola (Irish pronunciation: [ˈl̪ˠasˠəɾʲˌiːnˠə]; born c. 1977), known mononymously as Lasairfhíona, is an Irish singer-songwriter. She is deeply rooted in the sean-nós singing style of her home on Inis Oírr, one of the Aran Islands.

== Biography ==
Lasairfhíona Ní Chonaola was born on Inisheer, Aran Islands, the only daughter and eldest of four children of Dara Ó Conaola and his wife Pacella. Her father had trained as a craftsman and woodwork teacher, and later became a writer, including of a book with his wife, Cuairt ar Oileáin Árann/Guide to the Aran Islands, which has been published annually since 1978. Her mother, educated at The Grafton Academy of Fashion Design, Dublin, and a relative of the artists Albert Power and May Power, is a maker of traditional red Aran skirts and shawls. Their children were raised in an Irish-speaking household. After boarding school in Galway, Lasairfhíona graduated in Celtic Studies from Trinity College Dublin.

Her début album An Raicín Álainn (pronounced An Rackeen Aw-lyn), was launched in 2002 at the Festival Interceltique in Lorient, Brittany. It was selected by Hot Press music magazine as one of the best folk albums of 2002. It was described by fRoots magazine as "one of the most sumptuous traditional albums to have emerged for some time."

Lasairfhíona was the subject of a special documentary on the RTÉ Léargas television series (directed by Moira Sweeney) in 2002. In 2003, she sang on Sinéad O'Connor's DVD, Goodnight, on the track Thank You, You’ve Been A Lovely Audience.

Lasairfhíona performed during this time in venues around Ireland, including the National Concert Hall in Dublin, Town Hall Theatre in Galway and at the Montreux Jazz Festival in Switzerland. Lasairfhíona also took part in many television and radio programmes. Her song "Dragonfly", set to music by Lasairfhíona and Hector Zazou was on the soundtrack for the DVD Play Magazine. This showcased the fashion collection for Fall/Winter 2004/2005 of the designers Prada, Issey Miyake, Manolo Blahnik and Jimmy Chou.

In 2004 Lasairfhíona's singing featured on a compilation album of the best emerging Irish music that was produced by the Department of Arts, Sport and Tourism in Ireland and The Music Board of Ireland to mark the Irish presidency of the European Union.

Lasairfhíona released her second album, Flame of Wine, in 2006. The title is a literal translation of her name. It included newly composed songs in Irish and in English. The album is co-produced by Máire Breatnach. The latter also provides some musical accompaniment along with musicians Mary Bergin, Johnny McDonagh, Bill Shanley and Lasairfhíona's brother, MacDara. Lasairfhíona was nominated for a Meteor Irish Music award for the album.

Following a successful fundraiser, Lasairfhíona's third album, One Penny Portion, was released in 2016.

== Discography ==
=== Solo albums ===
- 2002 – An Raicín Álainn
- 2005 – Flame of Wine
- 2016 – One Penny Portion

=== Appearances and collaborations ===
- 1998 – Lights in the Dark (Hector Zazou & Lasairfhíona)
- 2003 – Femmes Celtes (Various artists)
- 2003 – Gaelic Ireland (Various artists)
- 2004 – Rough Guide to Irish Music (Various artists)
- 2006 – The Aran Lifeboat Collection (Various artists)
- 2008 – Celtic Dreamland (Various artists)
- 2008 – Experience Ireland (Various artists)
- 2020 – Ag Caint le Synge - Talking to Synge (CD of recitations and songs accompanying a book of poems)

=== DVD appearances ===
- 2002 – Goodnight, Thank You, You've Been a Lovely Audience (Sinéad O'Connor)
- 2003 – Aran Islands – A Journey Through Changing Times (Various artists)

=== Film appearances ===
- 2022 – The Banshees of Inisherin (Director: Martin McDonagh, Writer: Martin McDonagh)
