= Dolmen Press =

Irish printing press

- Industry: Books, publishing
- Founded: 1951
- Founder: Liam and Josephine Miller
- Headquarters: Dublin, Ireland
- Products: Books

Dolmen Press was an Irish book publisher founded by Liam and Josephine Miller in 1951.

== History ==
In 1951 Liam acquired an Adana hand press from Blanaid and Cecil Ffrench Salkeld on loan which they had used for their Gayfield Press, with a case of Bodoni type. Some accounts state that the first publication of the press was 500 copies of a collection of four ballads, Travelling Tinkers, by Sigerson Clifford. Others believe that the first publication printed was Thomas Kinsella’s The Starlit Eye. The Press took printing jobs from publishers as well as theatres, art galleries, businesses and individuals. The Press later printed using an Albion flat bed press and Caslon type.

Founded to provide a publishing outlet for Irish poetry, the Press published the work of Irish artists and other artists, such as Elizabeth Rivers, working in Ireland. The scope of the press grew to include prose literature by Irish authors as well as a broad range of critical works about Irish literature and theatre. The Press published a variety of works by W.B. Yeats, as well as the Yeats Centenary Series. In 1969, the Press published Thomas Kinsella's translation of The Táin which took 15 years from concept to final publication and featured illustrations by Louis le Brocquy. The Press created the Brogeen Books division in the 1980s for books aimed at young readers. The Press operated in Dublin from 1951 until Liam Miller's death in 1987.

The National Library of Ireland purchased the Dolmen Press collection of ephemera in 2009 from Jack Gamble of Emerald Isle Books. The Library of Trinity College Dublin's Dolmen Press Collection contains 387 items published by Dolmen as well as the Freyer Dolmen Press Collection, containing 446 Dolmen Press imprints.

== Book series ==
- The Irish Theatre Series
- The Tower Series of Anglo-Irish Studies
