= Cathal Goulding =

Irish Republican Army leader (1923–1998)

- Goulding in 1994
- Born: 2 January 1923; Dublin, Ireland
- Died: 26 December 1998 (aged 75); Dublin, Ireland
- Political party: Sinn Féin (Official SF from 1970); Workers' Party
- Spouse: Patty Germaine (m. 1950; separated)
- Partner: Beatrice Behan
- Children: Cathal Og Goulding; Paudge Behan; Aodhgan Goulding; Banban Goulding
- Military career
- Branch: Irish Republican Army; Official Irish Republican Army
- Service years: 1939–1972
- Rank: Chief of Staff; Quartermaster General
- Conflicts: The Troubles
- Other work: Political activist

Cathal Goulding (Irish: Cathal Ó Goillín; 2 January 1923 – 26 December 1998) was an Irish republican activist, socialist, and Chief of Staff of the Irish Republican Army (IRA), holding the position from 1962 to 1976. Born into a working-class Dublin family with a deep republican tradition, he spent a total of sixteen years in British and Irish prisons for IRA activities. He is best remembered as the figure who steered the republican movement away from physical-force nationalism and toward socialist political agitation during the 1960s, recruiting a new generation of activists to a range of social and economic campaigns and drawing the movement into engagement with the Northern Ireland civil rights movement.

Following the IRA split of 1969 to 1970, Goulding led the Official IRA, which declared a ceasefire in 1972. He subsequently guided the gradual transformation of the Official republican movement through a succession of political incarnations, from Official Sinn Féin to Sinn Féin the Workers' Party (1977) and ultimately the Workers' Party (1982). Though this process was marked by repeated splits and diminishing electoral relevance, Goulding remained committed to his socialist republican convictions until his death. The Workers' Party described him posthumously as "the leading republican of his generation who led the IRA away from military campaigns and into socialist politics."

== Early life ==
Cathal Goulding was born on 2 January 1923 at 1 East Arran Street, north Dublin, one of four sons and three daughters of Charles Goulding, a housepainter, and Bridget Goulding (née Costello). His family had a long tradition of republican activism and working-class militancy. His paternal grandfather had been involved with both the Fenians and the Irish National Invincibles, and his father and an uncle fought in the Easter Rising of 1916. Both parents were jailed during the Irish Civil War, and thereafter were sympathetic to social republicanism. His father, blacklisted by employers owing to his Civil War allegiance, subsequently worked as a self-employed contractor. Goulding was educated locally in north Dublin city until the age of fourteen, after which he served an apprenticeship and practised as a housepainter and decorator. From youth, he had a close friendship with writer Brendan Behan, with whom he shared a common background, trade, and politics. According to the Jack Holland, Behan was also a cousin of Goulding's.

Goulding joined Fianna Éireann, the IRA's youth wing, at age eleven. He joined the IRA in 1939 and in December of that year took part in a raid on Irish Army ammunition stores in the Phoenix Park, Dublin. In November 1941, he was gaolled for a year in Mountjoy Prison for membership of an unlawful organisation and possession of IRA documents. On his release in 1942, he was immediately interned at the Curragh Camp, where he remained until 1944.

In 1945, Goulding was among twenty-five to thirty men who met at O'Neill's pub on Pearse Street, Dublin, in an attempt to re-establish the IRA following the relentless wartime suppression it had endured. He organised the first national meeting of Irish Republican Army (IRA) activists after the Second World War, held in Dublin in 1946, which was subsequently raided by the Garda Síochána. Goulding, along with John Joe McGirl and ten others, received twelve-month prison sentences.

On his release in 1947, he organised IRA training camps in the Wicklow Mountains and took charge of the IRA's Dublin Brigade in 1951.

== The Felsted arms raid and imprisonment ==
In July 1953, Goulding, along with Seán Mac Stiofáin and Manus Canning, raided the armoury of the Officers' Training Corps at Felsted School in Essex, England. The raid yielded 99 rifles, 18 Bren and Sten guns, one anti-tank gun, a two-inch mortar, and a Browning machine gun. The three men were apprehended when their van, grossly overloaded with the haul of weaponry, was noticed by a routine police patrol. They were tried, and without the jury retiring, were found guilty in, as Mac Stiofáin later recalled, a matter of seconds by the jurors turning to one another and nodding. They received eight-year sentences and were imprisoned at Pentonville, Wakefield, and Stafford prisons, serving six years before release in 1959.

In 1956, an attempt by the IRA to free Goulding from Wakefield Prison was aborted when alarms were sounded. During his time at Wakefield, he befriended EOKA members and Klaus Fuchs, a German-born spy who had passed information about the American nuclear programme to the Soviet Union. Through these associations, Goulding developed a growing interest in the Russian Revolution. Goulding's imprisonment meant he was not involved in the early years of the IRA's border campaign, thereby escaping culpability for its failure, and remaining neutral between the rival IRA factions engaged in bitter recriminations over the conduct of the campaign.

== Chief of Staff of the IRA and the "new direction" ==
Goulding was appointed the IRA Quartermaster General in 1959 and, in 1962, succeeded Ruairí Ó Brádaigh as IRA Chief of Staff, a position he held until 1969. He assumed command of a demoralised and depleted organisation, and undertook a thorough reassessment of the history and future direction of the republican movement, involving a prolonged period of internal discussion and education. In February 1966, he was arrested together with Seán Garland for possession of a revolver and ammunition. In total, Goulding spent sixteen years in British and Irish jails.

Devoid of the traditional IRA disdain for "civilians", Goulding solicited the advice of radically minded intellectuals external to the movement, notably two Trinity College Dublin lecturers, Roy Johnston and Anthony Coughlan, both veterans of the Connolly Association, a British-based Marxist group, and deeply influenced by the association's chief ideologue, Desmond Greaves. Their analysis held that the economic liberalism of Seán Lemass was increasing the Republic of Ireland's dependence on British capital and facilitating a British master plan to reintegrate the Republic into the United Kingdom. They argued that republican aspirations of national independence and reunification must be pursued through social and economic resistance, conducted by a "national liberation front" of republicans, trade unionists, small farmers' organisations, and other progressives, combined with a united front campaign for full political democracy in Northern Ireland.

On the basis of this analysis, Goulding in the mid-1960s led the republican movement into what he described as a "new direction," away from the traditional concentration on armed struggle toward active engagement in political, social, and economic agitation. Republicans started, helped to start, or joined what Goulding himself called "a scatter of campaigns" around such issues as industrial strikes, rural cooperatives, housing conditions in Dublin, and ground rents in Dún Laoghaire. They sponsored committees on the ownership, control, and exploitation of natural resources, especially fisheries and minerals, and targeted foreign companies, investors, and landowners as "agents of economic imperialism." They conducted illegal "fish-ins" on private rivers, asserting the right of the Irish people to own the nation's waters.

As The Independent noted, under Goulding the IRA changed its messaging from "Get the British troops out of the north" to "Defeat imperialism and capitalism in all of Ireland". In Northern Ireland, Goulding circumvented a government ban on Sinn Féin by fostering the formation of Republican Clubs, which actively supported the civil rights movement. The strategy was sanguine in its hopes of enlisting the Protestant working class in a united-front campaign for political and social reform, and thereby undermining the cross-class hegemony of the Ulster Unionist Party. Goulding redefined the IRA's role as an armed guarantor of the social and political gains attained by a mass, revolutionary popular movement.

By the late 1960s, Goulding could be found in the fashionable bars around St Stephen's Green, Dublin, drinking with writers, musicians, and painters, a recognised figure of Dublin bohemia. Critics of his leadership invariably portrayed him as a good but easily influenced man who had fallen among Marxist intellectuals.

== The 1969 split and the formation of the Provisional IRA ==
Tensions had emerged with physical-force traditionalists, alarmed by the ideological subordination of armed struggle, the consequent decline in military readiness, and the embracing of socialist politics. Goulding exacerbated these tensions through what have been described as ham-fisted efforts to discipline recalcitrants, including expulsions of individuals and branches, and the disbandment of the women's section, Cumann na mBan. These tensions came to a head amid the outbreak of sectarian violence in Northern Ireland in August 1969.

Traditionalists accused Goulding, who had refused to release arms to IRA units in Belfast and Derry, of failing to defend nationalist areas from attack by loyalist mobs. In August 1969, Goulding issued a statement asserting that IRA men had been moved into Northern Ireland to defend Catholics who had been "terrorised by mobs backed by armed B-Specials" and warned that British forces must not be "used to suppress the legitimate attempts of the people to defend themselves". Goulding's own position was that sending more guns into such a volatile situation would have been, as he put it, like throwing petrol on a fire, and that the correct response was to intensify the existing political strategy.

Faced nonetheless with a revolt in the Belfast IRA, he persisted with an initiative to rescind the republican movement's policy of abstention from parliamentary politics at Leinster House, Stormont, and Westminster. Supported by majorities at both a general army convention in December 1969 and the Sinn Féin Ard-Fheis in January 1970, his position precipitated the withdrawal of dissident traditionalists, who formed a Provisional Army Council led by Mac Stiofáin, and an allied caretaker Sinn Féin executive led by Ruadhrí Ó Brádaigh.

== The Official IRA ==
After the split, Goulding remained as Chief of Staff of the now-called "Official" IRA. In July 1971, during a graveside oration in the Republic, he asserted that when peaceful efforts to effect revolutionary social change were countered by violent repression, it was the prerogative of the Official movement to reply in "the language of the bomb and the bullet". Goulding was subsequently indicted for incitement to cause explosions or to shoot people, but was acquitted, being the last person in the Republic to be so charged.

In the aftermath of Bloody Sunday on 30 January 1972, the Official IRA launched a retaliatory campaign in Britain and Northern Ireland. The most high-profile attack carried out by the Official IRA was also widely regarded as poorly executed. This was the bombing of the Parachute Regiment's headquarters in Aldershot in 1972, conducted within weeks of "Bloody Sunday", when paratroopers shot and killed 14 people in Derry. The Aldershot attack resulted in the deaths of seven individuals, comprising six members of the domestic staff and a Catholic chaplain. The ferocity of the broader campaign alienated nationalist opinion throughout Ireland. Under Goulding's lead, the Official IRA declared a conditional ceasefire on 29 May 1972, while reserving the option of "defensive" or "retaliatory" military actions.

During the 1970s, the Officials (nicknamed the "Stickies") killed approximately 50 people and had around 40 of their members and supporters killed in return, with many casualties resulting from feuding with the Provisional IRA and other republican groups.

== Further splits and transformation into the Workers' Party ==
Goulding and other Official leaders were thereafter severely critical of what they characterised as the "purely military campaign" of the Provisionals, which they described as sectarian, counter-productive, and devoid of a political strategy. Their gradualist approach to Irish reunification precipitated another breakaway movement, the Irish Republican Socialist Party, under Seamus Costello, launched in December 1974 and linked to a new paramilitary body, the Irish National Liberation Army. Sporadic skirmishing and periods of sustained feuding continued for some years between the Official IRA and both the Provisionals and the INLA.

In 1973, Goulding led the army council into a decision to transform the Official movement into a revolutionary vanguard political party with a Marxist philosophy and a Leninist organisation based on democratic centralism. He was deeply involved in the subsequent evolution of "Official Sinn Féin" into "Sinn Féin The Workers' Party" in 1977, and then the "Workers' Party" in 1982. His service for many years on the party's Ard-Comhairle fuelled allegations that the party retained links with the Official IRA, and was partly financed by army criminality.

In the late 1970s, he initiated another sweeping ideological reassessment, which identified southern Ireland's increasing dependence on non-British, chiefly American, sources of foreign investment, and outlined a programme of defending and expanding the public sector. Akin to the contemporaneous Eurocommunist parties, with which it established fraternal links, the Workers' Party attracted mounting electoral support in the Republic through the 1980s.

Along with his partner, Dr Moira Woods, Goulding was involved in the Anti-Amendment Campaign in opposition to the introduction of a constitutional abortion ban.

== Later years and death ==
Goulding vigorously resisted the ideological revisionism within the Workers' Party stimulated by the Gorbachev reforms in the USSR and the subsequent disintegration of the Soviet Union. The dissension culminated in the defection of six of the party's seven TDs to form the breakaway Democratic Left in 1992. Accusing the defectors of abandoning socialism in the opportunistic pursuit of short-term political power, Goulding regarded Democratic Left's entry into a coalition government led by Fine Gael in 1994, and its subsequent merger with the Labour Party in December 1998, as vindication of his critique.

In January 1990, twenty years after the original split in the republican movement, he told the Irish News: "We were definitely right, but right too soon. Adams may be right in pushing the Provos toward politics, but he's too late. And Ruairi O Bradaigh will never be right".

In his later years, Goulding spent much of his time at his cottage in Raheenleigh near Myshall, County Carlow. He died of cancer in Dublin on 26 December 1998. He was cremated and his ashes scattered, at his own directive, at the site known as "the Nine Stones" on the slopes of Mount Leinster.

The Workers' Party described him as "the leading republican of his generation who led the IRA away from military campaigns and into socialist politics." His longtime associate and then-national treasurer of the Workers' Party, Seán Garland, described him as being among that rare breed "prepared to give of their all" for future generations, characterising him as "a totally reliable and utterly incorruptible comrade." A spokesman for Democratic Left, despite the differences of recent years, acknowledged that Goulding "is entitled to enormous credit for the central role he played in refocusing the republican movement during the 1960s," adding that had more people followed his example, "much of the dreadful violence of the past 30 years might have been avoided".

== Personal life ==
Described as a small, intense man, both convivial and philosophical in temperament, Goulding was a self-deprecating raconteur with a boisterous sense of humour who revelled in company and conversation. He enjoyed the company of young people, who in turn valued his humour, storytelling, and humanity. He socialised widely with writers, artists, and fellow drinkers, and was a recognised figure of Dublin bohemia. Around 1950, he married Patty Germaine, from whom he eventually separated. They had one son, Cathal Óg Goulding. In the 1960s, he had a relationship with Beatrice Behan (the widow of his longtime friend and colleague Brendan Behan) with whom he had a son, Paudge Behan. From 1971 to 1991, he lived with Moira Woods, a feminist doctor, and her six children by previous relationships. He and Woods had one son and one daughter together, Aodhgán and Banbán Goulding Woods.

== Sources ==
- Hanley, Brian; Millar, Scott (2009). The Lost Revolution: The Story of the Official IRA and the Workers' Party. Dublin: Penguin Ireland. ISBN 978-1844881208.
- Utley, T. E. (1997) [1975]. The Lessons of Ulster. Friends of the Union.
- Cathal Goulding: Thinker, Socialist, Republican, Revolutionary, 1923–1998. The Workers' Party. 1999.
