= London Kills Me =

- Theatrical release poster
- Directed by: Hanif Kureishi
- Written by: Hanif Kureishi
- Produced by: Tim Bevan
- Starring: Justin Chadwick; Steven Mackintosh; Emer McCourt; Roshan Seth; Fiona Shaw; Brad Dourif; Tony Haygarth; Stevan Rimkus; Eleanor David; Alun Armstrong
- Cinematography: Edward Lachman
- Edited by: Jon Gregory
- Music by: Sarah Sarhandi; Mark Springer
- Production companies: PolyGram Filmed Entertainment; Working Title Films
- Distributed by: Manifesto Film Sales (through Rank Film Distributors)
- Release date: 13 December 1991
- Running time: 107 minutes
- Country: United Kingdom
- Language: English
- Budget: £1.57 million
- Box office: £31,000 (UK)

London Kills Me is a 1991 film written and directed by Hanif Kureishi set in Notting Hill and starring Justin Chadwick and Steven Mackintosh.

== Cast and roles ==
- Justin Chadwick as Clint Eastwood
- Steven Mackintosh as Muffdiver
- Emer McCourt as Sylvie
- Roshan Seth as Dr. Bubba
- Fiona Shaw as Headley
- Brad Dourif as Hemingway
- Tony Haygarth as Burns
- Eleanor David as Lily
- Alun Armstrong as John Stone
- Nick Dunning as Faulkner
- Naveen Andrews as Bike
- Rowena King as Melanie
- Stevan Rimkus as Tom-Tom
- Ben Peel as DJ at party
- Danny John-Jules as Black Man at Party
- Paudge Behan as White Thug at Party
- Yemi Goodman Ajibade as Tramp
- Sandy McDade as Woman Diner
- Tracey MacLeod as TV Interviewer
- George Miller as Mr. Runcipher
- Philip Glenister as Suited Man
- Charlie Creed-Miles as Kid in Lift
- Karl Collins as Barman
- Sean Pertwee as German Tourist
- Pippa Hinchley as German Tourist
- Marianne Jean-Baptiste as Nanny
- Garry Cooper as Mr. G
- Gordon Warnecke as Mr. G's Assistant
- Dave Atkins as Heavy
