= Blanaid Salkeld =

Irish poet, actor, and publisher

Blánaid Salkeld
- Born: Florence Madeline ffrench–Mullen; 10 August 1880 Chittagong, Bengal Presidency, British India
- Died: 18 December 1959 (aged 79) Dublin, Ireland
- Spouse: Henry Salkeld (m. 1902; died 1909)
- Children: 2 including, Cecil Ffrench Salkeld
- Relatives: Madeleine ffrench-Mullen (cousin); Beatrice Behan (granddaughter); Paudge Behan (great–grandson)

Blánaid Salkeld (born Florence Madeline ffrench–Mullen; 10 August 1880 – 18 December 1959) was a Bengali–born Irish poet, playwright, actor, publisher, salonnière, translator, and reviewer. Salkeld's literary salon was attended by, among others, Patrick Kavanagh and Flann O'Brien.

== Early life and family ==
Salkeld was born Florence Madeline ffrench–Mullen on 10 August 1880 in Chittagong, Bengal Presidency (present-day Bangladesh) to Jarlath ffrench-Mullen, a Lieutenant colonel in the Bengal Medical Service, and Anna Maria "Mina" Byrne. Salkeld had at least one brother, and was the paternal cousin of the revolutionary and labour activist Madeleine ffrench-Mullen.

Spending her childhood in Dublin, her father was a friend of Rabindranath Tagore and also introduced her to the poetry of Keats. In 1902, Salkeld married Henry L. Salkeld, a British civil servant, in Bombay (present-day Mumbai, India). The couple had two children, including the artist Cecil Ffrench Salkeld. In 1910 (Note: Also cited as 1906 and 1908.), Salkeld and her children returned to Dublin following the death of her husband the previous year.

== Career ==
In Dublin, she joined the Abbey Players as an actor, using the Irish form of her name, Blánaid (then spelled Blathnaid) and the stage name Nell Byrne. She played the lead role in George Fitzmaurice's three-act play The Country Dressmaker. She started writing verse plays in the 1930s, and one of these, Scarecrow Over the Corn, was staged in 1941 at the Gate Theatre with stage sets designed by Louis le Brocquy. Salkeld contributed numerous book reviews to The Dublin Magazine, Irish Writing, and The Bell. She translated Akhmatova, Bruisov, Blok, and Pushkin from the Russian into English. The salons she hosted in her home were frequented by Kate O'Brien, Arland Ussher, Patrick Kavanagh, Flann O'Brien, and Micheál Mac Liammóir. Her first volume of poetry, Hello Eternity, was praised by Samuel Beckett. She founded the Irish Women's Writers' Club with Dorothy Macardle in 1933.

She co-founded the Gayfield Press with her son, Cecil, in 1937. It operated from the garden shed at their home at 43 Morehampton Road until 1946. The press was a small Adana wooden hand press. The Salkelds later loaned the press to Liam and Josephine Miller in 1951, with which they founded the Dolmen Press.

During the preparations for the Easter Rising, a room on the first floor of 130 St Stephen's Green which she had lent to Thomas MacDonagh was his headquarters.

Her work is considered overlooked within the canon of early 20th century Irish poetry, as it was neither of the Celtic revival or modernist.

== Personal life ==
Salkeld was the grandmother of Beatrice Behan, an artist, memoirist and widow of Brendan Behan, the actress Cecila "Celia" Salkeld (1934–1984) and the great-grandmother of the writer and actor Paudge Behan.

On 18 December 1959, Salkeld died in Dublin aged 79.

== Poetry ==
Salkeld published five books of poetry:

- Hello, Eternity (Elkin Mathews 1933)
- A Dubliner (Dublin: Gayfield 1942)
- The Fox’s Covert (JM Dent 1935)
- The engine is left running (Gayfield 1937)
- Experiment In Error (Aldington, Kent: Hand & Flower Press 1955)
