= Maurice MacGonigal =

Irish painter (1900–1979)

- Born: 22 January 1900; Dublin, Ireland
- Died: 31 January 1979 (aged 79)
- Occupation: Painter

Maurice MacGonigal (22 January 1900 – 31 January 1979) was an Irish landscape and portrait painter and influential teacher.

== Life ==
Maurice MacGonigal was born in Ranelagh, Dublin on 22 January 1900. His parents were Francis and Caroline MacGonigal (née Lane). His father was a painter and decorator from Sligo. MacGonigal was the only son, and the third child. He was educated at Synge Street Christian Brothers School, and in 1915 was apprenticed to the stained glass studios of his uncle Joshua Clarke. His father was a partner in this studio at 33 North Frederick Street, and Clarke was MacGonigal's uncle and he worked alongside his cousin, Harry Clarke. During this time, MacGonigal learnt decorative design and drawing.

In 1917, MacGonigal was enlisted into Na Fianna Éireann by Bulmer Hobson, serving as an IRA dispatch rider during the War of Independence reporting to Sean Dowling in C Coy, 4th Battalion, Dublin Brigade. He was arrested and interned from 8 December 1920 in Kilmainham Gaol, and was later moved to Ballykinlar camp, County Down. While in Ballykinlar he was elected prisoners' intelligence officer. MacGonigal was released in 1921, and immediately resigned from all republican organisations to concentrate on his art.

On 6 August 1940, he married Aida Kelly. The couple had two sons, Muiris Diarmuid Mac Conghail born 1941, and Ciaran MacGonigal born 1945. They lived at various homes across Dublin, in the city centre as well as Booterstown, Ranelagh, and Rathgar. MacGonigal died in Baggot Street hospital, Dublin on 31 January 1979. He is buried at Gorteen graveyard, Roundstone, County Galway. A large studio palette that once belonged to William Orpen was placed on his grave.

== Career ==
MacGonigal was made a partner with Harry Clarke, working as a designer while an evening student at Dublin Metropolitan School of Art. He won a Taylor scholarship for 3 years for his painting A public meeting, going on to study as a day student from 1923 to 1926. Whilst there he studied under Seán Keating, Patrick Tuohy, and James Sleator. His 1923 watercolour, Prisoners on the roof, Kilmainham, documented a historic republican protest. MacGonigal visited the Aran Islands in 1924, marking the beginning of an interest in the west of Ireland. In 1925, he exhibited a stained-glass panel, Baal, at the Arts and Crafts Society of Ireland exhibition, but soon after moved away from this medium to concentrate on painting. Following a visit to the Netherlands in 1927 to study in The Hague, MacGonigal was influenced by the work of Anton Mauve and Vincent van Gogh.

Touring the coasts of north County Down and County Antrim with Hobson, MacGonigal produced a watercolour series between 1927 and 1930, culminating in his first solo show in 1929 in the St Stephen's Green gallery. He illustrated Kenneth Sarr's 1927 The white bolle-trie: a wonder story. From 1927, MacGonigal was a visiting art teacher at the Royal Hibernian Academy (RHA), and from 1934 was a substitute teacher for the Metropolitan School of Art. From 1924 to 1979, he exhibited with the RHA every year, with an average of 5 works annually. In 1931, he was elected an associate of the RHA, and a full member in 1933. MacGonigal produced rural landscapes, but also cityscapes, genre scenes based in both urban and rural settings, and historically or politically important subjects. Some of his paintings were included in Saorstát Éireann: Irish Free State official handbook (1932). His work was part of the painting event in the art competition at the 1948 Summer Olympics.

He was a member of the Academy of Christian Art from 1933. He served as the keeper of the RHA school twice, between 1934 and 1939 and 1950 to 1961, living at the keeper's residence on Ely Place during his second tenure. In 1926, MacGonigal founded the Radical Club, exhibiting work there. His work, A Dublin studio, includes fellow members such as Séan Keating, Harry Kernoff, Frank O'Connor, and Seán O'Sullivan. He also designed the sets for the first production of The silver tassie by Sean O'Casey in Dublin, in the Abbey Theatre in 1935. From 1937 to 1954, MacGonigal served as assistant professor of painting at the newly reformed National College of Art (NCA) under Keating. He succeeded Keating as professor in 1954, remaining in the post until 1969. From 1947 to 1978, he was professor of painting at the RHA, and president from 1962 to 1978. From the 1960s, MacGonigal's work became more abstract, as demonstrated in Composition (1961) which shows influence from cubism. In 1963, he was made an honorary member of the Royal Academy, London, and in 1964 an honorary member of Royal Scottish Academy. MacGonigal resigned as professor in NCA in response to the 1969 student revolt against the conservative curriculum, citing an erosion of the educational authority of the teachers. He was a critic of the Irish government's tax-free status to creative artists brought into effect in 1969, stating that it would bring "the art parasites of Europe" to Ireland.

MacGonigal served as a governor and guardian of the National Gallery of Ireland, and in 1970 was awarded an honorary Doctor of Laws from the National University of Ireland. In 1971 he sat on the advisory committee of the Project Art Centre, Dublin, and from 1972 was an elected member of the Water Colour Society of Ireland. The Limerick City Gallery of Art holds a self portrait of MacGonigal, and in 1991 the Hugh Lane Municipal Gallery of Modern Art held a major retrospective exhibition of his work.

== Selected works ==
- The beach at Renvyle (1930)
- Manannán Mac Lir series (1932) commissioned by Irish Hospitals' Trust
- Dockers (1934)
- A Dublin studio (c.1935)
- Mural for the Irish pavilion at the New York world's fair (1939)
- The rescue from the prison van at Manchester (1940–46)
- An gorta (The famine) (1946)
- A summer's day (1948)
- Early morning, Connemara (Mannin Bay) (1965)
- Stony beach, Feothanach (1972)
- Races, Ballyconneely, County Galway (1976)
