= A Man of No Importance (film) =

- DVD cover
- Directed by: Suri Krishnamma
- Written by: Barry Devlin (screenplay)
- Produced by: Jonathan Cavendish
- Starring: Albert Finney; Brenda Fricker; Michael Gambon; Tara Fitzgerald; Rufus Sewell; Patrick Malahide
- Cinematography: Ashley Rowe
- Edited by: David Freeman
- Music by: Julian Nott
- Release dates: 10 September 1994 (Toronto International Film Festival); 22 December 1994 (United States)
- Running time: 99 minutes
- Countries: United Kingdom; Ireland
- Language: English
- Box office: $920,016 (USA)

A Man of No Importance is a 1994 comedy drama film written by Barry Devlin and directed by Suri Krishnamma, starring Albert Finney.

== Plot summary ==
Alfred Byrne is a closeted homosexual bus conductor in 1963 Dublin. His sister tries to find him a suitable woman, but his real passion is putting on amateur theatre productions of Oscar Wilde plays, particularly Salome. The film deals with his struggle, temptation, and friendships, and how they are affected by his homosexuality.

Alfred is a bus conductor who recites poetry and Oscar Wilde play lines to his regular bus riders. This year he hopes to put together the Wilde play Salome. Alfie lives with his sister Lily. He lines up the church hall only telling the priest that the play is about John the Baptist. A new beautiful young rider, Adele Rice, is his perfect Salome. Alfie lives above the Carson Butcher Shop and he slates up the butcher as King Herod. He wants his bus driver Robbie to be John the Baptist, but Robbie refuses, saying he is no actor. When the theatre group meets, Alfie tells them that they are not doing The Importance of Being Earnest this year but rather Salome. Butcher Carson finds the play offensive and misses rehearsals.

Byrne goes ahead with his amateur production with his friend Birdy as stage manager and Mrs. Crowe for costumes and assumes all is going well. Alfie's sister sets up a dinner date and a trip to the zoo with his leading lady, Adele. She tells Alfie she already had a boyfriend, John. Widow Birdie tells Alfie of the joys and benefits of marriage. An actor questions Alfie about his portrayal of Salome as a virgin princess. Butcher Carson goes to the church council and tries to stop the smut-filled play.

Alfie decides to give in to temptation and go to a gay bar. He approaches a young good looking man called Kitty and asks for a cuddle. They go outside and he is mugged and robbed. His closeted homosexuality is exposed. He suffers from fierce homophobia from his community, but he does get some support from actors in his play.

== Cast ==
- Albert Finney as Alfred Byrne
- Brenda Fricker as Lily Byrne
- Michael Gambon as Ivor J. Carney
- David Kelly as Birdy
- Tara FitzGerald as Adele Rice
- Rufus Sewell as Robbie Fay
- Patrick Malahide as Inspector Carson
- Mick Lally as Father Ignatius Kenny
- Anna Manahan as Mrs. Grace
- Joe Pilkington as Ernie Lally
- Brendan Conroy as Rasher Flynn
- Joan O'Hara as Mrs. Crowe
- Eileen Reid as Mrs. Rock
- Eileen Conroy as Mrs. Curtin
- Maureen Egan as Mrs. Dunne
- Jonathan Rhys-Meyers as first young man (his first film role)
- Enda Oates as The Garda
- Maureen Mc Arthur as The bowling lady
- Paudge Behan as Kitty

== Release ==
The film opened 22 December 1994 in the United States in 5 theaters and grossed $40,954 in its opening 5 days. It grossed $920,016 in the United States and Canada.

== Reception ==
Rotten Tomatoes reported that 83% of the critics have given the film a positive review based on 18 reviews with an average rating of 6.8/10.

== Year-end lists ==
- Dishonorable mention – Glenn Lovell, San Jose Mercury News

== See also ==
A Man of No Importance, a musical based on this film.
