= Constituting America =

American non-profitable organization

Constituting America is a non-profit, non-partisan organization that educates and informs the public about the U.S. Constitution and why it's relevant today. The organization utilizes popular culture (music, film, television, internet, and social media) to reach, educate, and inform America’s adults and youth about the non-partisan relevancy of the U.S. Constitution. Constituting America was founded on February 17, 2010 by actress/author Janine Turner and Cathy Gillespie, a former senior congressional aide.

Constituting America is "committed to reversing the trend of civic apathy and ignorance existing among the American people."

== School involvement ==
Founded to preserve the U.S. Constitution, Constituting America places special emphasis on bringing the Constitution to life in schools across the country. The founders of the organization visit schools in a school speaking program and provide clubs for students to become involved in. Additionally, Constituting America hosts an annual We The Future scholarship contest for students across the country.

== 90 Day Study ==
Every year, Constituting America hosts a 90 Day Study of 90 essays written to educate and inform Americans of the importance of the founding documents. The 90 Day Study is a compilation of essays written about the U.S. Constitution, The Federalist Papers, and the Founding Era. The 2020 90 Day Study is a study of important dates in American history that shaped the United States and changed the world. The scholastic study is written by constitutional scholars from some of the most notable universities and law schools in the country.
