= Stolen Women: Captured Hearts =

1997 film by Jerry London

- DVD cover
- Written by: Richard Fielder
- Directed by: Jerry London
- Starring: Janine Turner; Patrick Bergin; Jean Louisa Kelly; Michael Greyeyes; Rodney A Grant
- Country of origin: United States
- Original language: English

Production
- Producers: Leigh Murray; Vanessa Greene

Original release
- Network: CBS
- Release: March 16, 1997

Stolen Women: Captured Hearts is a 1997 made-for-television film directed by Jerry London. The film stars Janine Turner as Anna Morgan, a woman living on the plains of Kansas in 1868 who is kidnapped by a band of Lakota people. It also stars Patrick Bergin, Jean Louisa Kelly, Michael Greyeyes, and Rodney A. Grant. The story is loosely based on the real Anna Morgan who was taken by Cheyenne Indians for approximately one year before being returned to her husband.

== Plot ==
The story is set on the plains of Kansas in 1868, where General George Custer has destroyed a village of Cheyenne Indians. Seeking revenge, a band of Lakota led by Tokalah (Michael Greyeyes) attack a wagon train headed to Fort Hays, Kansas, where they kill nearly everyone in the wagons. However, when Tokalah comes to the remaining wagon driven by Anna Brewster (Janine Turner) he lets her and her pregnant friend go.

Anna makes it to Fort Hays and is met by her brother Stewart (Ted Shackelford), a pastor, who has arranged for her to marry Daniel Morgan (Patrick Bergin). Not long after her marriage, Sarah White (Jean Louisa Kelly) is visiting Anna when Tokalah and other Lakota men break into the home and take both women. Daniel and Stewart try to go after them but are unsuccessful in following their trail, as is Captain Robert Farnsworth (Dennis Weaver) who later joins the hunt.

At the Lakota camp, Sarah resists blending in while Anna takes more readily to their culture. Tokalah, who begins to learn English from young half-white Cetan (William Lightning), and Anna grow closer. Sarah and Anna steal horses and escape one night. Tokalah and his men catch up with them and Tokalah sends the men back with Sarah. He and Anna argue, with Anna saying that she never asked to be taken from her husband, but Tokalah tells her that she did ask, claiming that he "heard her" ask. Giving into their feelings, they spend a passionate night together on the plains.

Back at Fort Hays, General Custer (William Shockley) arrives to take over the search using his favorite scout, a Native American named Bloody Knife. He, Farnsworth, Daniel and Stewart make contact with Tokalah and Chief Luta (Saginaw Grant) who tell him that they can have Sarah but not Anna. Daniel realizes that Tokalah has "lain with" Anna and Custer puts Luta under arrest, saying he will be hanged if both women are not returned. The next day, the Lakota return and a battle ensues, and a wounded Tokalah returns to camp. Anna tells Tokalah she must leave in order to spare Luta; Tokalah tells her that they belong together, as he had seen her before in a vision. Anna still leaves to Custer's encampment and Luta is released.

Anna returns to her husband and their home, where Sarah soon visits and tells Anna that she must leave her husband as she now knows where she belongs. After giving Daniel one last night together, Anna rides off to the Lakota camp only to find it destroyed. She then sees Tokalah still on the land, mourning. He assumes she is another vision, but she touches his face and they confess their love and embrace.

== Cast ==
- Janine Turner as Anna Brewster
- Patrick Bergin as Daniel Morgan
- Jean Louisa Kelly as Sarah White
- Michael Greyeyes as Tokalah
- Rodney A. Grant as Waxanhdo
- William Shockley as General George Armstrong Custer
- Saginaw Grant as Chief Luta
- William Lightning as Cetan
- Ted Shackelford as Stewart Brewster
- Dennis Weaver as Captain Robert Farnsworth
- Selina Jayne as Kimimila
- Kateri Walker as Manipi
- Apesanahkwat as Bloody Knife

== The Real Anna Brewster Morgan ==
According to historical reports, the real Anna Brewster was born December 10, 1844, and eventually went to live with her brother Daniel, who arranged for her to marry a man named James Morgan in 1868. One month later, a band of Sioux Indians raided their homestead and shot James and took Anna captive. The Sioux, traveling back to their village, met a band of Cheyenne Indians who had already captured a woman named Sarah White.

Anna was traded to the Cheyenne and went to live with them. She eventually married an Indian Chief whose name is not recorded but was found by General George Custer approximately a year after her capture, by which time she was pregnant with the Chief's child. Returned to James Morgan, she gave birth to a half-Indian son, Ira, but the boy fell ill and died around age 2, just ten days after the birth of the Morgans' daughter, Mary.

Anna bore James two more sons, Claud and Glen, but their marriage was not a happy one; Anna is reportedly quoted as saying, "I often wished they had never found me." Eventually Anna left James and went to live with her brother Daniel. James divorced her, and Anna lived under a lifelong stigma because of what happened to her, causing her to be admitted to a mental hospital later in life where she died in 1902. She was buried next to her son Ira.

Sarah White was with Anna when Custer found them, She became a schoolteacher. She married, had seven children, and died in 1939.
