= A Secret Affair (1999 film) =

1999 American television film

- Based on: A Secret Affair by Barbara Taylor Bradford
- Screenplay by: Carole Real
- Directed by: Bobby Roth
- Starring: Janine Turner; Fionnula Flanagan; Paudge Behan
- Music by: Stephen McKeon
- Country of origin: United States
- Original language: English

Production
- Executive producers: Andrew Adelson; Tracey Alexander; Robert Bradford
- Producers: James Flynn; Morgan O' Sullivan
- Cinematography: Eric Van Haren Norman
- Editor: Armen Minasian
- Running time: 88 minutes
- Production companies: Adelson Entertainment; Tracey Alexander Productions

Original release
- Network: CBS
- Release: October 27, 1999

A Secret Affair is a 1999 American made-for-television romantic drama film directed by Bobby Roth and starring Janine Turner. It is based on Barbara Taylor Bradford's novel of the same name.

== Synopsis ==
Vanessa Stewart (Turner) has the soul of an artist, but her business tycoon father insists that she follow in his footsteps. As a result, Vanessa convinces herself that she wants to be a globetrotting executive, and also that she truly loves the man to whom she is engaged. But while in Venice on a business trip at the behest of her father, Vanessa meets and falls in love with adventurous Irish TV war correspondent Bill Fitzgerald (Behan). Deciding to kick over the traces, Vanessa is prepared to turn her back on her family obligations and plight her troth with Bill. But fate, as it often does, takes a hand in matters when Bill is reported killed during a dangerous combat assignment.
