= Patrick Tuohy =

Irish painter (1894–1930)

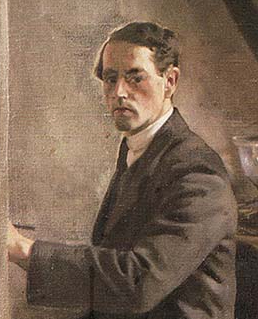
- A crop from "Self Portrait With Two Girlfriends" (1922)
- Born: Patrick Joseph Tuohy; 27 February 1894; Dublin, Ireland
- Died: 1930 (aged 35–36); New York City, US
- Education: Dublin Metropolitan School of Art
- Known for: Portrait painting

Patrick Tuohy (27 February 1894 – August 1930) was an Irish portrait, narrative, and genre painter.

== Early life ==
Patrick Joseph Tuohy was born in Dublin on 27 February 1894, at 77 Lower Dorset Street. His parents were the surgeon, John Joseph Tuohy, and Máire Tuohy (née Murphy). His father had a surgery at 15 North Frederick Street, and his mother was a member of numerous nationalist organisations such as Cumann na mBan. He had two older sisters, Maura and Bride. Tuohy was born without a left hand, and would later wear a metal prosthesis which he covered with a black glove, and he used to hold a painting palette. He attended a Christian Brothers school in Dublin and later became one of the first pupils at Patrick Pearse's St. Enda's School, there he studied art under William Pearse. In 1908, his watercolour sketch, "In Co. Wicklow", was published in the school magazine An Macaomh. He attended the Dublin Metropolitan School of Art at night, going to become a full-time student, studying under William Orpen for five years. It was Orpen who encouraged him to work on his life drawing, with his 1910 "Girl in a white pinafore" an early example of his portraiture. Along with his father he fought in the Easter Rising and was based alongside James Connolly in the General Post Office.

== Career ==
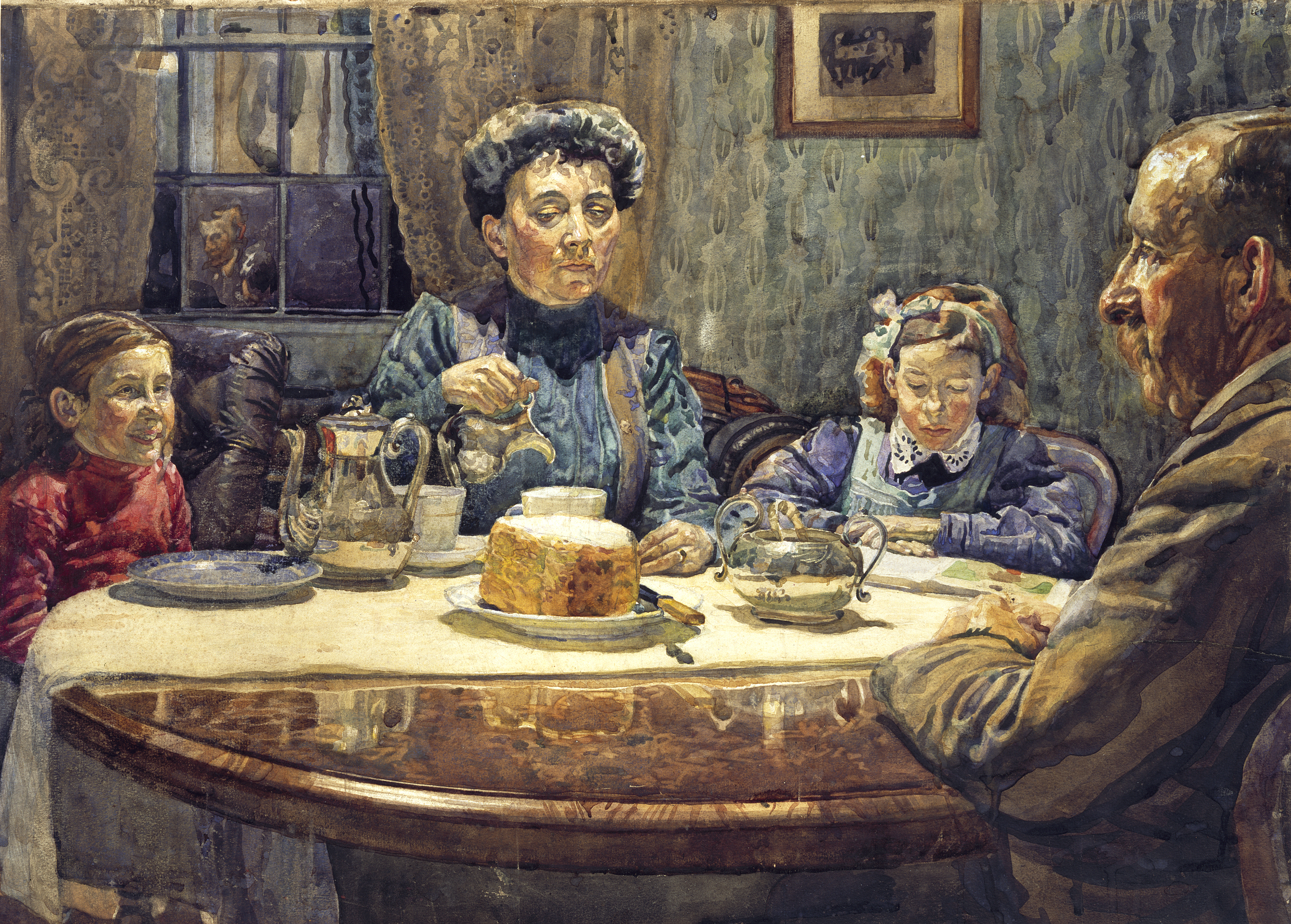
"Supper Time" by Tuohy (circa 1912) held by the National Gallery of Ireland

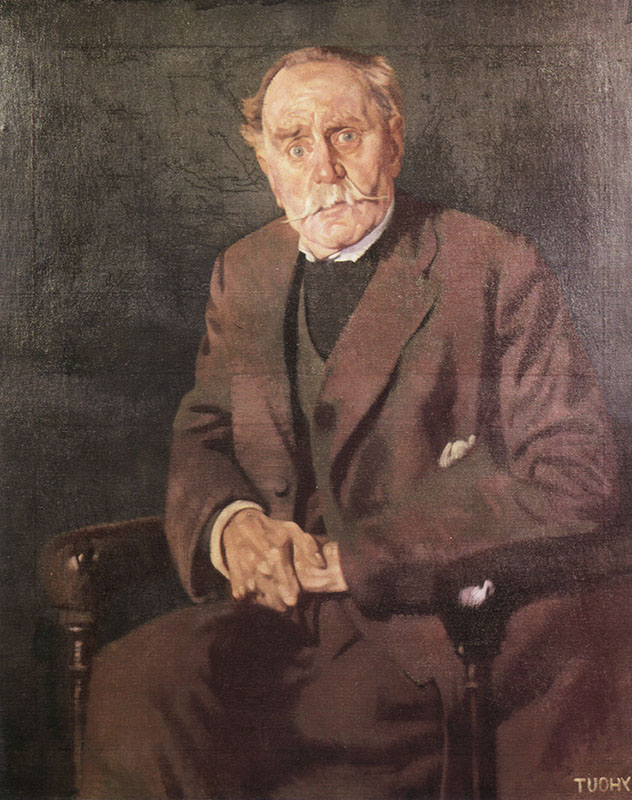
John Joyce by Tuohy

Tuohy exhibited 3 paintings at the Small Concert Rooms, Dublin in 1911, an exhibition that included George Russell and Jack B. Yeats. Having spent the summer of 1911 in Tourmakeady, County Mayo, his preliminary sketches for his 1912 "A Mayo peasant boy" which demonstrates his realistic portraiture which reveals human vulnerability and his emerging distinctive style. His first commission was in 1912 for 10 ceiling painting of the life of Christ in Rathfarnham Castle for the Jesuit order. He then executed ceiling paintings at the La Scala theatre, Dublin. He won the Taylor art scholarship in 1912 for his watercolour, "Supper time", and later won the Taylor award in 1915 for his watercolour portrait of May Power. She was his most frequently used model. Tuohy was able to use these and other prizes to travel to Spain, living in Madrid for a year while teaching painting at the Loreto convent, as well as studying the work of Francisco de Zurbarán and Diego Velázquez. He began exhibiting with the Royal Hibernian Academy (RHA) in 1918, exhibiting "The Wicklow labourer" and "A Mayo peasant boy". He continued to show work at the RHA until 1927. He contributed a pencil sketch to The book of Saint Ultan: a collection of pictures and poems by Irish artists and writers (1920) which was edited by Katherine MacCormack.

From 1920 to 1926, Tuohy taught life class with Seán Keating at the Dublin Metropolitan School of Art, where he taught Norah McGuinness, Maurice MacGonigal, and Hilda van Stockum. The influence of French realism can be seen in his "Standing female nude" and "Self-portrait with two women". The former was exhibited at the 1922 exhibition the Galerie Barbazanges in Paris, "L'Art irlandais", which was organised by Maud Gonne. The 1923 painting, "The baptism of Christ", is deemed to be one of his most influential, and is now held in the Ulster Museum. This work included portraits of a number of Tuohy's contemporaries such as Keating as John the Baptist, Thomas MacGreevy as an onlooker, Seán O'Sullivan, and Phyllis Moss. Moss was an art student who later became Tuohy's fiancée. The painting won a silver medal at the 1924 Aonach Tailteann exhibition, and in 1925 was exhibited at the Royal Academy of Arts, London. He and Moss visited Italy in the summer of 1923, returning to Ireland in 1924.

In 1923, he was commissioned by James Joyce to paint a portrait of Joyce's father, John Stanislaus Joyce. He also painted a portrait of Joyce himself in Paris on his return from Italy in 1924, which he painted over the course of 28 sittings. The portrait is now held in the State University of New York, Buffalo. He also painted Joyce's children, Giorgio and Lucia. Tuohy and Joyce had a difficult relationship, with Joyce portraying Tuohy as "Ratatuohy" in Finnegans wake (1939).

Tuohy painted portraits of a number of theatre personalities in the 1920s, such as Ria Mooney (1922), Padraic Colum (1924), and Seán O'Casey (1926). In 1924, he was elected an associate of the RHA, becoming a full member in 1925. Tuohy was a member of the Radical club in 1926. In 1927, he emigrated to the United States, in the hope of earning enough to allow him to marry. He initially lived in South Carolina, and then to New York. He had a studio at 440 Riverside Drive, and focused on portraiture, while living at 185 West 85th Street. The same year, he exhibited at the Carnegie Institute exhibition in Pittsburgh. He was one of the organisers the first contemporary exhibition of Irish art at the Hackett gallery, New York in 1929. He exhibited "Portrait of a girl in a striped dress" and a portrait of James Stephens at that show. This exhibition was later transferred to the Grace Holmes gallery, Boston. Tuohy was one of the founders of the Irish University Club, New York, lecturing on Irish art, as well as on Irish literature to the Irish reading circle.

== Death and legacy ==
It was reported by many who knew him that Tuohy suffered from depression. His friends became concerned when they had not seen him, with Ria Mooney and others gaining entry to his apartment out of concern. They found him dead on 28 August 1930, where it was determined that he died by suicide using gas. His sister Bride and Mooney claimed that he would not have taken his own life and that his death was accidental. His body was repatriated to Ireland on the Scythia liner, and he was buried at Glasnevin Cemetery. In his studio were the unfinished portraits of actors Dudley Digges and Claudette Colbert.

In 1931, a posthumous exhibition of his sketches, drawings, and paintings from 1911 to 1930 was held in Mills' Hall, Dublin. In 1985, two of paintings, "Near the Bull Wall" (1912) and "Portrait of Dominic Bowe" (circa 1915) were shown a major exhibition of Irish painting at the Gorry gallery, Molesworth Street. The Hugh Lane Gallery holds two of his early works from St. Enda's, "The flight of Cuchulainn" and "Entry into battle". The painting "The agony in the garden" from circa 1919 was originally held in the Loreto convent on North Great George's Street, Dublin, but was later moved to the Christ the King church, Cabra. The National Gallery of Ireland holds his papers.
