= Beatrice Behan =

Irish artist and author

- Born: Beatrice J. M. Salkeld; 31 December 1925; Mount Street, Dublin, Ireland
- Died: 9 March 1993 (aged 67); Anglesea Road, Ballsbridge, Ireland
- Education: National College of Art and Design
- Spouse: Brendan Behan (m. 1955; died 1964)
- Partner: Cathal Goulding
- Children: 2, including Paudge Behan
- Father: Cecil Ffrench Salkeld
- Relatives: Blanaid Salkeld (grandmother)

Beatrice J. M. Behan (née Salkeld; 31 December 1925 – 9 March 1993) was an Irish artist and memoirist.

== Early life and education ==
Behan was born Beatrice J. M. Behan Salkeld on 31 December 1925 in Mount Street, Dublin to an Irish father and a German mother. Behan's father, Cecil Ffrench Salkeld, was an artist and her mother, Irma Salkeld (née Tessler), was a home economics instructor. The paternal granddaughter of the poet Blanaid Salkeld, Behan was the elder sister of the actress Cecila "Celia" Salkeld (1934–1984).

Raised in Dublin, Behan was educated at Loreto College, St Stephen's Green. Later enrolling at National College of Art and Design, Behan initially attended as a day student before moving to study in the evening while working as a temporary clerk.

== Career ==
After graduating from NCAD, she took up as a position as a botanical assistant in the Natural History Museum, where she worked from 1949 to 1955. During this time she undertook further art study in Milan, Siena, and Florence. From 1948 to 1950, Behan exhibited with the Royal Hibernian Academy. Her work was exhibited at the Oireachtas Exhibition in 1957 and 1958, the Irish Living Art Exhibition in 1959, in New York in 1969 and 1970 and at the Irish pavilion at the World Fair in 1972. She assisted her father with murals in Davy Byrne's pub, Dublin, which she maintained afterwards.

== Married life ==
Through her family, she was introduced to Brendan Behan while she was still in school. They met again years later, and after a brief relationship, the couple married in February 1955. The couple's only daughter, Blanaid, was born shortly before his death in 1963. Later on, Behan had a son, Paudge Behan, with Cathal Goulding.

When the couple were first married, she supplemented the family's income by working as a horticultural illustrator with The Irish Times. The couple were based in Dublin, but they spent periods of time in Paris, New York and London. Behan was tolerant of her husband's heavy drinking and behaviour, describing him as a "great, loveable genius." She illustrated her husband's Hold your hour and have another (1963). After her husband's death she worked with Alan Simpson on the unfinished play Richard's cork leg.

== Later life ==
In 1973, Behan published her memoir My life with Brendan. After her husband's death, Behan settled all of his many debts. Behan was found dead at her home on Anglesea Rd, Ballsbridge on 9 March 1993.
