= Leo Broe =

Irish sculptor

- Born: Bernard Joseph Broe; 16 April 1899; Dublin, Ireland
- Died: 9 April 1965 (aged 65); Dublin, Ireland
- Occupation: Sculptor

Leo Broe (16 April 1899 – 9 April 1965) was an Irish sculptor.

== Life ==
Leo Broe was born Bernard Joseph Broe on 16 April 1899 in Stillorgan, County Dublin. He was called Leo by his family after Pope Leo XIII, to whom his mother was devoted.

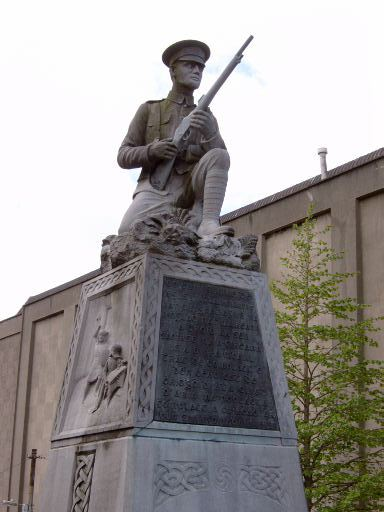
Monument by Broe to the Irish Volunteers in Phibsborough

Broe established a family sculpting business, Leo Broe and Sons, which was based in Harold's Cross, Dublin. His daughter, Irene, and son, Desmond, also became sculptors.

One of his most notable works is the monument in Phibsborough, Dublin to the men of the Old 'C' Company 1st Battalion Dublin Brigade of the Irish Volunteers from 1939. Broe himself was a member of the Irish Volunteers. His son Desmond was the model for his monument to Comdt. Sean Wall in Bruff, County Limerick. His work was exhibited alongside his daughter and son, as well as May Power, at the 1955 Institute of the Sculptors of Ireland exhibition in the Hugh Lane Gallery. The Hugh Lane Gallery holds a marble bust of Patrick Pearse by Broe.

Broe died on 9 April 1965, and is buried at Deans Grange Cemetery. Broe's grandson, Damian, was trained in the family sculpting business which was later known as Monumental Sculptors, while his grandson Shane McDonnell, from his daughter Irene, also became a sculptor.
