= Desmond Broe =

Irish sculptor

- Born: 1921; Dublin, Ireland
- Died: 16 September 1968 (aged 46–47); Dublin, Ireland
- Occupation: Sculptor

Desmond Broe (1921 – 16 September 1968) was an Irish sculptor.

== Life ==
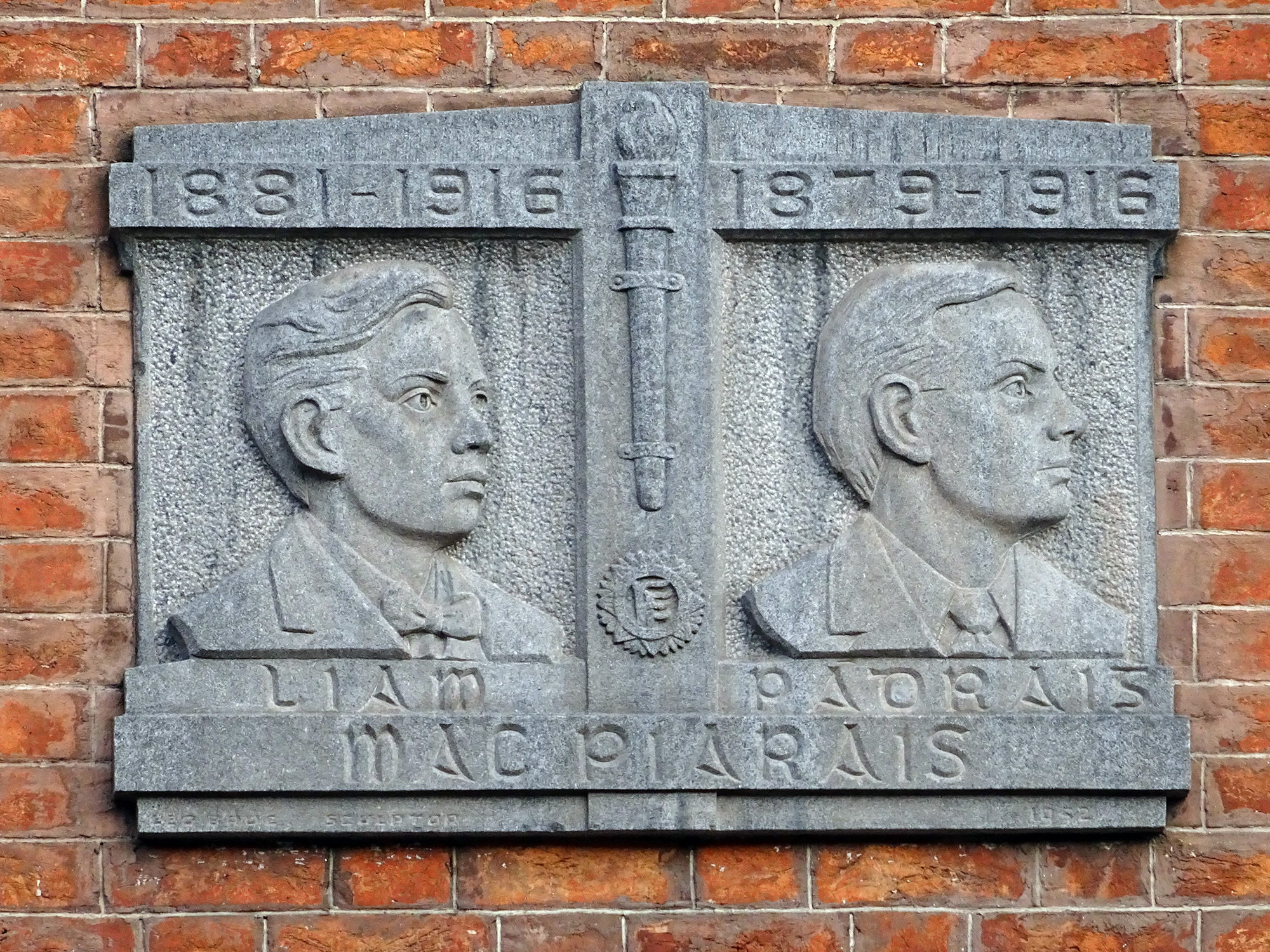
Broe's plaque to the Pearse brothers erected at their former home

His father, Leo, was a sculptor, with the family sculpting business run from a premises in Harold's Cross, Dublin. His sister, Irene, was also a sculptor.

Broe attended the National College of Art and Design, and won the Taylor Scholarship in 1943 for modelling. His work was part of the sculpture event in the art competition at the 1948 Summer Olympics. His work was exhibited alongside his sister and father, as well as May Power, at the 1955 Institute of the Sculptors of Ireland exhibition in the Hugh Lane Gallery. One of his most notable works in a plaque to Patrick and William Pearse, erected on their former home at 27 Pearse Street. He also carved the headstone at the family's burial plot in Deans Grange Cemetery, and the IRA Memorial in Athlone.

Broe's son, Damian, took over the family sculpting business which was later known as Monumental Sculptors.
