= Apesanahkwat =

Native American tribal leader and film and television actor

- Born: Apesanah Apsanahkwat; January 19, 1949 (age 77); Menominee Indian Reservation, Keshena, Wisconsin, U.S.
- Citizenship: Menominee Indian Tribe and American
- Occupations: Actor; former tribal chairman of Menominee tribe (8 terms)
- Years active: 1985–present

Apesanahkwat (born January 19, 1949) is a Native American tribal leader, activist, and film and television actor.

== Personal life ==
Apesanahkwat served as tribal chairman of the Menominee Indian Reservation eight times. He served in the United States Marine Corps and is a Vietnam War veteran. He is known for playing American Indian roles in such films and television series as Wind River, Northern Exposure, Stolen Women, Captured Hearts, Bagdad Cafe, and Babylon 5. He has competed in various Powwows across the United States as a northern traditional dancer. In 1989, during a rally at Lac du Flambea, Apesanahkwat protested against racism towards indigenous groups.

In March 2004, Apesanahkwat was the official keynote speaker at the Language and Culture Preservation Conference in Albuquerque, New Mexico, which was hosted by the Bureau of Indian Affairs Office of Indian Education Programs (OIEP). This event was meant to spread awareness of the importance of preserving Indian culture though language. Being the keynote speaker, Apesanahkwat called to action his community, stating the importance of giving back the Indian people their voice. Apesanahkwat is also known as one of the originators of the Indian Gaming Regulatory Act (GRA).

== Military history ==
Apesanhkwat was 20 years old when he entered the Vietnam War. After the war ended, Apesanahkwat suffered from PTSD (post traumatic stress disorder). After his traumatic experiences at war, he reconnected with his indigenous roots as a form of healing. When discussing his thoughts on war, Apesanahkwat says he believes that no man should have to experience it. Since Vietnam, he has been an active voice for his community as a supporter for PTSD awareness.

== Filmography ==
=== Film ===
Year	Title	Role	Notes
1987	Bagdad Cafe	Sheriff Arnie	
1994	Sioux City	Clifford Rainfeather	
2001	Lady in the Box	Felix	
2004	The Reawakening	Henry Johnson / Dark Spirit Being	
2005	The Rain Makers	Joe Crying Eagle	
2010	Nightbeasts	Louis Freebird	as Apesanahquat
2017	Wind River	Dan Crowheart	

=== Television ===
Year	Title	Role	Notes
1985	Tall Tales & Legends	Interpreter	Episode: "Annie Oakley"
1993	Harts of the West	Andrew	Episode: "Auggie's End"
1993–1995	Northern Exposure	Lester Haines	Recurring role; 5 episodes
1994	Gunsmoke: One Man's Justice	Six Eyes	Television film
1994–1995	Walker, Texas Ranger	Raymond Firewalker	Guest role; 3 episodes
1995	Babylon 5	Telepath No. 1	Episode: "A Race Through Dark Places"
1995	Siringo	Chinonero	Television film
1995	CBS Schoolbreak Special	Elder	Episode: "My Indian Summer"
1996	Goode Behavior	Chief Steve Davis	Episode: "Goode Samaritan"
1997	Stolen Women: Captured Hearts	Bloody Knife	Television film
1997	North of 60	Senator Jack Harper	Episode: "Love Hurts"
2002	Skinwalkers	Captain Butler	Television film
2004	Helter Skelter	Guard Duty Cop	Television film
2015	Longmire	Cheyenne Man	Episode: "Down by the River"
2016	Ray Donovan	Wovoka	Guest role; 2 episodes

== Bibliography ==
- "War to a Warrior – a journey home"
- "Green Bay Press-Gazette 19 Apr 1997, page Page 1" Newspapers.com. Retrieved 2023-02-21
- "Indigenous Education Columns" jan.ucc.nau.edu. Retrieved 2023-02-22.
- "Indian Tribal Conflict Resolution and Tort Claims and Risk Management Act of 1998" Retrieved 2023-03-05
