= Irene Broe =

Irish sculptor

- Born: 19 February 1923; Dublin, Ireland
- Died: 27 August 1992 (aged 69); Dublin, Ireland
- Occupation: Sculptor

Irene Broe (19 February 1923 – 27 August 1992) was an Irish sculptor.

== Life and family ==
Broe was born on 19 February 1923 in Nassau Street, Dublin. Her father, Leo, was a sculptor, with the family sculpting business run from a premises in Harold's Cross, Dublin. Her brother, Desmond, was also a sculptor. Broe first undertook courses in beauty studies before attending the National College of Art and Design from 1947, studying sculpture. She first enrolled in night classes, before becoming a full-time student and graduated in 1951. According to Professor Friedrich Herkner, a professor at NCAD, "She was a very serious student and made numerous studies from life and imagination and carried out her work in various materials. She was a very ambitious and conscientious student who always attended all her classes." In 1952, she visited Paris where on her return to Dublin, she became a member of the first council of institute of the sculptors of Ireland.

While living in London, she met a research biochemist by the name of Jim McDonnell who had also moved to London that year and they got married later that year. They moved to Malaysia where Jim was employed by the Malaysian Rubber Research Institute. In 1966, they moved back to Ireland taking up residence at 68 Carysfort Avenue, Blackrock, Dublin. While living there, they had a son, Shane (died 1994). Broe died in St Vincent’s Hospital, Dublin on the 27 August 1992.

== Career ==
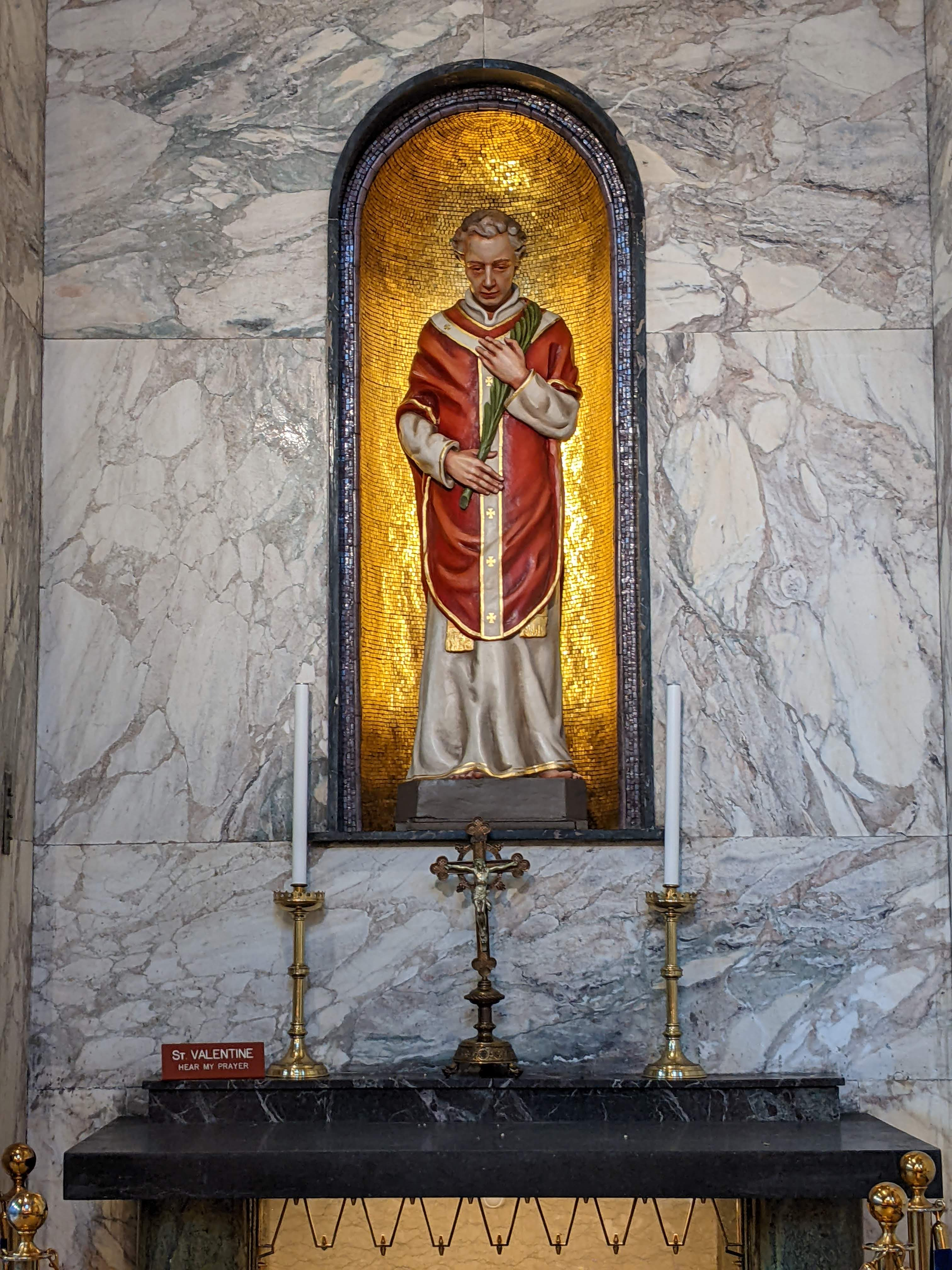
Statue of St Valentine by Broe

Broe developed more of a modern style of art compared to her father and brother's more traditional approach. Broe sculpted many portrait heads and a small amount of religious art also. Broe became a member of the first council of the Institute of the Sculptors of Ireland and took part in their annual exhibitions from 1953-1957. From 1953, Broe exhibited more than twenty-nine pieces of art at the Royal Hibernian Academy. She moved to London in 1958 and continued to work, where she met London-based sculptors, F.E. McWilliam and Lynn Chadwick.

Broe competed in the 1952 Summer Olympics in art (a non-medal event). Among her notable pieces are heads of Irish Free Education pioneer Donagh O'Malley (1968), Arland Ussher (1978), Roger Casement, W.B. Yeats, Brendan Behan and Samuel Beckett. She also sculpted portrait heads of her father, brother, and son, Shane McDonnell. These portraits were made from bronze and have become some of her most famous works. Shane learned sculpting from Irene and similarly chose bronze as his primary medium.

In 1959, Broe moved with her husband to Malaysia and lived there for seven years continuing her career. Broe was "actively involved in the art scene in Malaysia" where she took part in exhibitions in Malaysia and received many commissions. Broe was asked to sculpt a bust of Malaysian Prime Minister Tunku Abdul Rahman, commissioned by the National Union of Plantation Workers. This piece was present in the Malaysian Pavilion at the 1964 New York World's Fair can now be found in the house of parliament in Kuala Lumpur. Also, in 1964, Broe undertook a project to complete a portrait of Ralph Deraniyagala who was the speaker of the house of representatives in Sri Lanka.

A statue of St Clare by Broe can be seen in the Church of the Immaculate Conception, Dublin. The statue was shipped for casting in 1961, and the plaster was featured at The Exhibition of Irish Sacred Art in 1962.

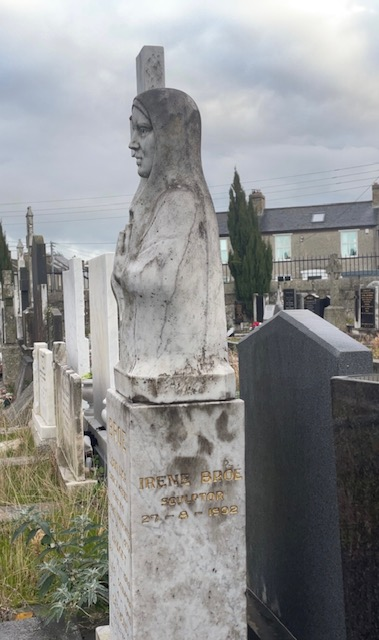
Grave of Broe

After returning to Ireland in 1966, Broe continued her work completing a portrait of author Patricia Lynch which appeared in the 1971 Dun Laoghaire Arts Week exhibition. Throughout her career Broe completed over ninety pieces of artwork. Her statue of St Valentine at the shrine at Whitefriar Street Carmelite Church, Dublin is possibly her best known work. The statue shows St Valentine in the "red vestments of a martyr and holding a crocus in his hand".

In 2013, the bronze bust of O'Malley sold at an auction for 1,036 US dollars and in 2021 another was sold at auction for $11,960. Four bronze castings have been made of the piece of art. The sculpture was made shortly before O'Malley died in 1968, four bronze castings were made and some can be found within colleges in Ireland such as Trinity College Dublin, the University of Limerick and the National College of Ireland. Her work was exhibited alongside her brother and father, as well as May Power, at the 1955 Institute of the Sculptors of Ireland exhibition in the Hugh Lane Gallery.
