= Circle of Deceit (1998 film) =

- Genre: Drama; Thriller
- Written by: Karen Clark
- Directed by: Alan Metzger
- Starring: Janine Turner; Esai Morales; Tracy Griffith; Joanna Cassidy
- Music by: Brian Adler
- Country of origin: United States
- Original language: English

Production
- Executive producer: Andrea Baynes
- Producer: Barbara Kelly
- Production location: Vancouver
- Cinematography: Ron Stannett
- Editor: Sidney Wolinsky
- Running time: 96 minutes
- Production companies: Andrea Baynes Productions; ABC Pictures

Original release
- Network: ABC
- Release: January 29, 1998

Circle of Deceit is a 1998 American thriller drama television film directed by Alan Metzger, written by Karen Clark, and starring Janine Turner, Esai Morales, Tracy Griffith and Joanna Cassidy. It aired on ABC on January 29, 1998.

== Plot ==
Having walked out on her cheating husband Jeff, Terry Silva moves in with her best friend Donna Avedon. This set-up proves most untenable when Terry finds out that Donna is Jeff's longtime mistress. Vowing to get revenge on both Jeff and Donna, Terry fakes her own death — intending to frame her husband and her faithless friend for murder.

== Cast ==
- Janine Turner as Terry Silva
- Esai Morales as Jeff Silva
- Tracy Griffith as Donna Avedon
- Robert Wisden as Coopersmith
- Dean Wray as Walker
- Joanna Cassidy as Elaine Greer
