= Cecil Barror =

Irish barrister and actor

Cecil John Rhodes Barror (12 August 1911 – 15 October 1999) was an Irish barrister, actor and broadcaster. He was a member of the Abbey Theatre from 1936–79.

Born in Clontarf, Dublin, Barror was married in 1942 to Ethna Graham who formed and conducted The Lindsay Singers, a choir that gained an international reputation. They had three sons and two daughters; the youngest Tony died at the age of 21 years in 1976.

In 1947 he was in a Radio Éireann production of a play by Irish playwright Teresa Deevy called Dignity.

Barror died in 1999 and is buried in Glasnevin Cemetery.

== Filmography ==
Year	Title	Role	Notes
1959	Broth of a Boy	Mr. O'Shaughnessy	
1980	The Sleep of Death	Deacon	
