= Ria Mooney =

Irish actress and director (1903–1973)

- Born: 30 April 1903; Rathmines, Dublin, Ireland
- Died: 3 January 1973 (aged 69); Dublin, Ireland

Ria Mooney (30 April 1903 – 3 January 1973) was an Irish stage and screen actress, artistic director of the Abbey Theatre (1948–1963) and director of the Gaiety School of Acting. She was the first female producer at the Abbey Theatre.

== Life ==
She was born in Rathmines, a suburb of Dublin, on 30 April 1903. She started acting as a child, sang with the Rathmines and Rathgar Musical Society as a teenager, and studied art at the Dublin Metropolitan School of Art. She was invited to join the Abbey Theatre in 1924 and acted alongside some of the great names of the day, such as Cyril Cusack, Maire O'Neill and F. J. McCormick in numerous plays. She played the part of Rosie Redmond in The Plough and the Stars on 8 February 1926, when the players were attacked during a riot in the theatre. She went on to play prominent roles in the period's most important Irish plays by O'Casey, Teresa Deevy, Carroll, Shiels, Robinson, Lady Gregory and Synge.

After spells abroad and at the Gate Theatre she was put in charge of the new Peacock Theatre and the Abbey Experimental Theatre Company at the Abbey in 1937. Her memoirs allude to an affair with the poet F. R. (Fred) Higgins who was on the board of the Abbey. Ria and Fred had discovered they were related, as third cousins, due to a chance conversation when they were both travelling to America together. She was shocked at his sudden death of a heart attack in 1941.

After Higgins' death Ernest Blythe was named managing director. She left the Abbey in 1944 to direct the Gaiety School of acting. In January 1948 she became resident producer at the Abbey. It was a difficult time for the Abbey, and Mooney had to contend with a demanding manager, Ernest Blythe, with whom she did not see eye-to-eye. An unexpected blow was the death of F. J. McCormick in 1947. Then on 17 July 1951, fire destroyed the Abbey Theatre. The company leased the old Queen's Theatre in September and continued in residence there until 1966. Mooney took the opportunity to employ younger actors, many of whom she knew from her time teaching at the Gaiety. Among them were Ronnie Masterson, Joan O'Hara, Ray McAnally, Philip O'Flynn, Angela Newman, Bill Foley and Doreen Madden. Between 1948 and 1963, seventy-five new plays were produced at the two Abbey locations; most of these were directed by Mooney, and most received excellent reviews from the Dublin critics.

In 1947 she helped with the setting up of the Radio Éireann Players.

== See also ==
- Abbey Theatre

== Productions of plays ==
- 1932: Temporal Powers
- 1935: The King of Spain's Daughter
- 1936: The King of Spain's Daughter
- 1936: Katie Roche
- 1937: Temporal Powers
- 1937: Katie Roche
