= Cecil Ffrench Salkeld =

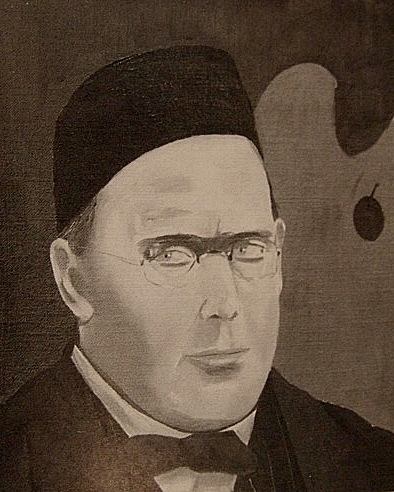
- Salkeld by Reginald Gray (1957)
- Born: 9 July 1904; Assam, India
- Died: 11 May 1969 (aged 64); St Laurence's Hospital, Dublin, Ireland

Cecil Ffrench Salkeld (9 July 1904 – 11 May 1969) was an Irish painter, printmaker, critic and writer.

== Early life and family ==
Cecil Ffrench Salkeld was born in Assam, British India, on 9 July 1904. His parents were Henry Lyde Salkeld, a member of the Indian Civil Service, and Blanaid Salkeld (née Mullen), a poet. He returned to Ireland with his mother in 1910 after the death of his father in 1909. He attended Mount St Benedict's, Gorey, County Wexford, and the Dragon School, Oxford. Salkeld did win a scholarship to Oundle but returned to Dublin where he entered the Dublin Metropolitan School of Art in 1919 to study under Seán Keating and James Sleator. He married Irma Taesler in Germany in 1922. They had two daughters, Beatrice and Celia.

== Career ==
Salkeld worked in tempera and oil, as well as etching and wood engraving. In 1921 he travelled to Germany to study under Ewald Dulberg at the Kassell Kunstschule. He attended the Union of Progressive International Artists in Düsseldorf in May 1922, and was exhibited at the Internationale Kunstausstellung. Upon his return to Dublin in 1924, he held his first solo exhibition in the Dublin Painter's gallery. He became a member of the Dublin Painters in 1927. With Francis Stuart, he co-edited the first two issues of To-morrow in 1924. His studio was in a converted labourer's cottage at Glencree, County Wicklow. He also exhibited with the New Irish Salon and the Radical Painters' Group.

He won the 1926 Royal Dublin Society's Taylor scholarship, and had his first exhibited work with the Royal Hibernian Academy (RHA) in 1929. He lived in Berlin for a year in 1932. He exhibited in Daniel Egan's Gallery in Dublin in 1935. He had a wide circle of literary friends, including Samuel Beckett and Flann O'Brien. In O'Brien's At Swim-two-birds the character of Michael Byrne was designed for Salkeld, reflecting his debilitating alcoholism. Salkeld also taught at the Dublin Metropolitan School of Art, teaching artists such as Reginald Gray.

From 1937 to 1946 he had run a private press called Gayfield Press. This was co-founded with his mother, and operated from a garden shed at their home, 43 Morehampton Road. The press was a small Adana wooden hand press. He illustrated her 1938 The Engine left running, as well as Ewart Milne's Forty North Fifty West (1938) and Liam O'Flaherty's Red Barbara and other stories (1928). In 1951, Salkeld loaned the press to Liam and Josephine Miller to found the Dolmen Press.

Salkeld's most famous public work is his 1942 three-part mural in Davy Byrne's pub. He was a co-founder of the Irish National Ballet School in the 1940s in his capacity as a pianist. In 1946 he was appointed an associate member of the RHA. In 1953 his play Berlin dusk was staged at 37 Theatre Club, Dublin. During the 1950s he was a broadcaster with Radio Éireann as well as a director of cultural events for An Tóstal. Salkeld died on 11 May 1969 in St Laurence's Hospital, Dublin.

The National Gallery of Ireland holds a portrait by Salkeld of his daughter, Celia.
