= Janine Turner =

American actress (b. 1962)

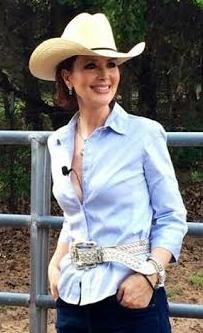
- Turner at her ranch in 2014
- Born: Janine Loraine Gauntt; December 6, 1962 (age 63); Lincoln, Nebraska, U.S.
- Occupation: Actress
- Years active: 1980–present
- Children: 1
- Website: janineturner.com

Janine Turner (born Janine Loraine Gauntt; December 6, 1962) is an American actress best known for her roles as Maggie O'Connell in the television series Northern Exposure, as Jessie Deighan in the feature film Cliffhanger, and as Katie McCoy in Friday Night Lights. She is an author, public speaker and founder and co-chair of Constituting America 2010.

== Early life ==
Turner was born Janine Loraine Gauntt in Lincoln, Nebraska, the daughter of Janice Loraine (née Agee) and Turner Maurice Gauntt Jr. Her parents returned to their native Texas three years after her birth, and Turner grew up in Euless and Fort Worth, Texas.

== Career ==
In 1978, the 16-year-old Turner left home to pursue a modeling career with the Wilhelmina Modeling Agency in New York City. She began her acting career in 1980 in Hollywood, appearing in several episodes of Dallas. In October 1981 Turner could be seen in a television commercial for Buf-Puf body sponge. She continued to make guest appearances on television shows throughout the 1980s before landing the role of Laura Templeton on General Hospital.

By 1986, Turner had become frustrated by the quality of the roles she was getting. As she told the Chicago Tribune five years later, "I was always working, but I wanted to do more serious roles and knew that I had the talent. I had to get away from Hollywood." Disregarding her agent's advice, Turner moved to New York in order to hone her craft, studying in Manhattan with Marcia Haufrecht of the Actors Studio.

I gained a new respect and appreciation for acting in New York. And I decided that I didn't want to lock myself into roles that portrayed women negatively. I turned a lot of (TV and film) opportunities down because of that. Everyone thought I was crazy. I was really going for broke. I only had eight dollars left and had become very depressed right before I got the part in Northern Exposure.

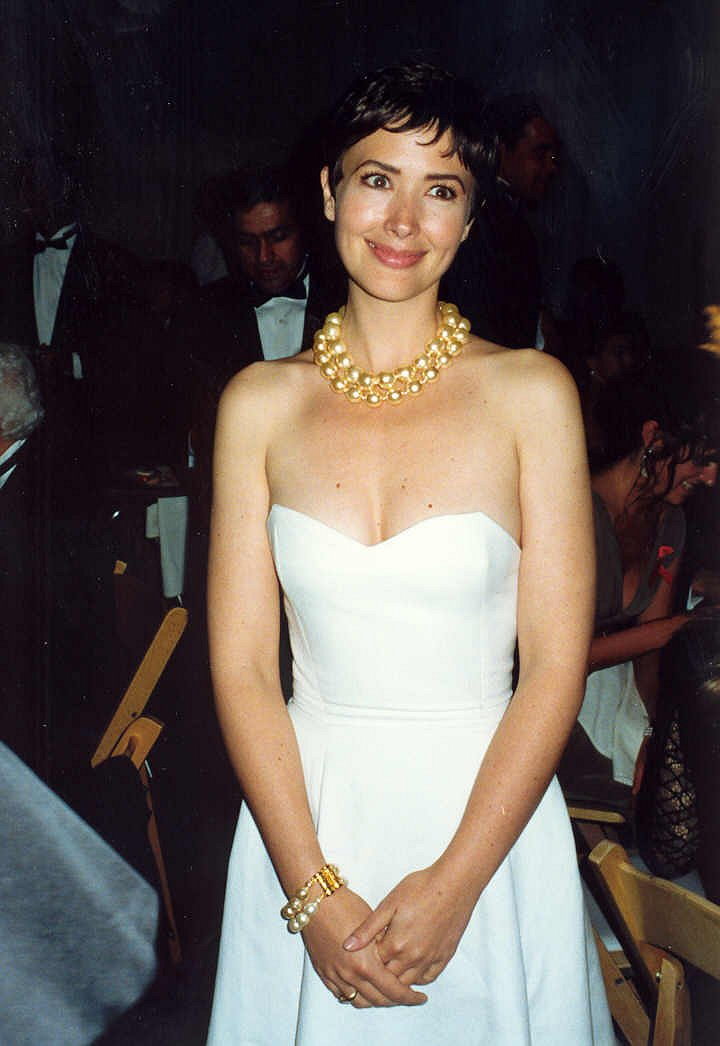
Janine Turner at the Governor's Ball after the 1992 Emmy Awards

Cast as Maggie O'Connell in 1990, Turner's work on Northern Exposure earned her an Emmy nomination in 1993 and three consecutive Golden Globe nominations from 1992 to 1994. Accolades aside, the role itself was a positive experience for Turner, following the "damsel in distress" roles that had all but driven her from Hollywood in the first place. "I've found my ideal character in Maggie," she told the Tribune. "She's smarter and stronger than all the men she meets." Turner's own move from Hollywood to New York was mirrored by Maggie's, from her affluent Grosse Pointe community to the remote fictional backwater of Cicely, Alaska. Turner said about Maggie that "She went against the grain and challenged herself by moving to Alaska."

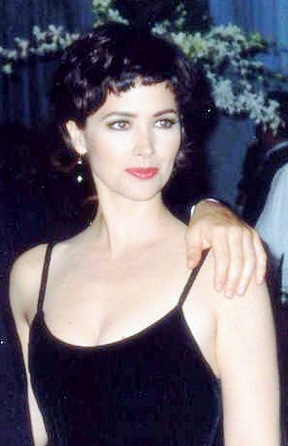
Turner at the 1993 Emmy Awards, Governor's Ball

After her breakthrough in Northern Exposure, Turner appeared in the action film Cliffhanger opposite Sylvester Stallone. She next appeared as June Cleaver in a Leave It to Beaver film adaptation of television's original Leave It to Beaver, then in Stolen Women: Captured Hearts, and Dr. T & the Women with Richard Gere. She also appeared in No Regrets and numerous movies of the week.

In 2004, Turner wrote, produced, and directed the award-winning Trip in a Summer Dress, a film about a strong-willed mother and her children. In 2006, she appeared in a low-budget movie filmed in Dallas, The Night of the White Pants, with Tom Wilkinson. In 2007, she co-wrote, co-produced, and starred in Christoga, a Christian Yoga DVD, Turner also co-wrote and produced an album, Mockingbird Hill, in which both she and her daughter Juliette sang.

In 2008, Turner began a 12-episode run on the NBC television series Friday Night Lights. She portrayed Katie McCoy, mother of a talented high school football quarterback.

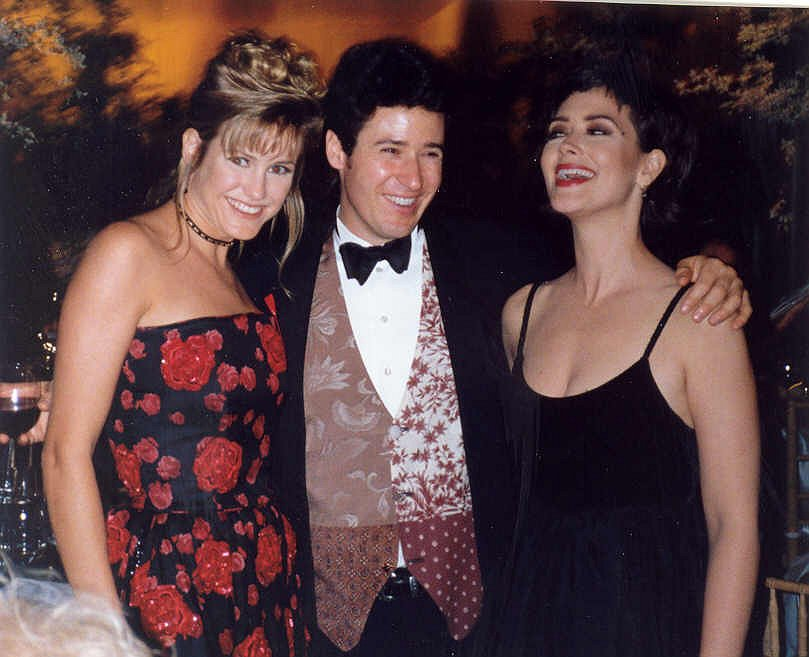
Cynthia Geary, Rob Morrow and Janine Turner at the 45th Primetime Emmy Awards, September 1993

In 2015, Turner portrayed the wife of Anthony Hopkins' character in Solace.

In 2010 Turner founded and is the co-president of the organization Constituting America with co-president Cathy Gillespie, aimed at educating American adults and students about the non-partisan relevancy of the U.S. Constitution.

On May 21, 2011, Turner began hosting a live two-hour talk show, The Janine Turner Show, on talk radio station KLIF (AM) in Dallas, and in Houston, KPRC (AM), followed by iHeart Radio until 2013. It was awarded "Best Radio Show in Dallas".

Turner is the author of four books, Holding Her Head High: Inspiration from 12 Single Mothers Who Championed Their Children and Changed History,A Little Bit Vulnerable: On Hollywood, God, Sobriety, & Politics, Wisdom For Each Day: Inherited From My Great Grandfather, and Artificial Intelligentsia Vs. Primal Sense. Holding Her Head High focuses on single mothers through history, such as Rachel Lavein Fawcett, the abandoned single mother of Alexander Hamilton.

== Activism and advocacy ==
In 2006, Turner was appointed a member of the President's Council on Service and Civic Participation. In 2010, Turner launched her public speaking career on the national circuit and became a public inspirational speaker on a plethora of topics, including heart health, sobriety, faith, the Constitution, and politics. She speaks at corporate events, civic events, schools, universities, and churches.

Turner has described herself as "socially liberal and fiscally conservative. I'm almost more libertarian." Turner has written 85 essays on the 85 Federalist Papers, and many op-ed pieces for the Washington Examiner, The Washington Times, and FoxNews.com. Turner has written a petition, "The Truth Act" – and corresponding white paper, "Long and Little Known: How Incoherent Statutes Harm Liberty & the Rule of Law".

== Personal life ==
Turner has never married. Her daughter, Juliette Turner-Jones, was born in 1997. Turner was once engaged to Alec Baldwin and also dated Troy Aikman, Mikhail Baryshnikov, Mark Grace and Sylvester Stallone. As of 2014, Turner was living on a longhorn cattle ranch outside Dallas with her daughter.

== Filmography ==
=== Film ===
Year	Title	Role	Notes
1982	Young Doctors in Love	Soap Cameos	
1986	Knights of the City	Brooke	
1986	Tai-Pan	Shevaun Tillman	
1988	Monkey Shines	Linda Aikman	
1989	Steel Magnolias	Nancy-Beth Marmillion	
1990	The Ambulance	Cheryl Turner	
1993	Cliffhanger	Jessie Deighan	
1997	The Curse of Inferno	Layla Moanes	
1997	Leave It to Beaver	June Cleaver	
2000	Dr. T & the Women	Dorothy Chambliss	
2004	No Regrets	Cheryl	
2004	Trip in a Summer Dress	Mama	short film; also director, writer, editor, and executive producer
2006	Miracle Dogs Too	Paula Wells	direct-to-video
2006	The Night of the White Pants	Barbara Hagan	
2009	Birdie & Bogey	Amy	
2009	Maggie's Passage	Jenny Sirron	
2015	The Ivy League Farmer	Ella Gilbert	
2015	Solace	Elizabeth Clancy	
2016	Occupy, Texas	Mrs. Thomas	
2018	Gosnell: The Trial of America's Biggest Serial Killer	Dr. North	
2023	Birthright Outlaw	Bonnie Beauchamp	

=== Television ===
Year	Title	Role	Notes
1980–1981	Dallas	Susan	3 episodes
1981	Mr. Merlin	Sheila	Episode: "All About Sheila"
1981–1982	Behind the Screen	Janie-Claire Willow	13 episodes
1982	The Love Boat	Betsy Dunvar	Episode: "The Victims/Man in the Iron Shorts"
1982–1983	General Hospital	Laura Templeton	44 episodes
1983	The Paper Chase	Sondra	Episode: "Birthday Party"
1983	Happy Days	Debbie	Episode: "Where the Guys Are"
1983	Boone	Maggie	Episode: "Words and Music"
1984	The Master	Gina/Teri	Episode: "The Good, the Bad and the Priceless"
1984	Santa Barbara	Hollywood Woman	Episode: "#1.8"
1984	The New Mike Hammer	Christine	Episode: "Bonecrunch"
1985	The A-Team	Theresa Gianni	Episode: "The Big Squeeze"
1985	Knight Rider	Karen Forester	Episode: "KITTnap"
1986–1987	Another World	Patricia Kirkland	2 episodes
1989	Quantum Leap	Michelle	Episode: "Catch a Falling Star"
1990–1995	Northern Exposure	Maggie O'Connell	110 episodes
1997	Stolen Women: Captured Hearts	Anna Brewster	Television film
1998	Circle of Deceit	Terry Silva	Television film
1998	Beauty	Alix Miller	Television film
1999	Fatal Error	Dr. Samantha Craig	Television film
1999	A Secret Affair	Vanessa Stewart	Television film
2000–2002	Strong Medicine	Dr. Dana Stowe	50 episodes
2005	Walker Texas Ranger: Trial by Fire	Ranger Kay Austin	Television film
2007	Primal Doubt	Jean Harper	Television film
2008	Law & Order: Special Victims Unit	Victoria Grall	Episode: "Inconceivable"
2008–2009	Friday Night Lights	Katie McCoy	12 episodes
2019	Patsy & Loretta	Hilda Hensley	Television film
2021	Taking the Reins	Bonnie	Television film

== Awards and nominations ==
Emmy Award

- 1993: Nominated, "Outstanding Lead Actress in a Drama Series" – Northern Exposure

Golden Globe Award

- 1992: Nominated, "Best Performance by an Actress in a TV-Series – Drama" – Northern Exposure
- 1993: Nominated, "Best Performance by an Actress in a TV-Series – Drama" – Northern Exposure
- 1994: Nominated, "Best Performance by an Actress in a TV-Series – Drama" – Northern Exposure
- 1995: Turner Hosted 52nd Annual Golden Globe Awards

Screen Actors Guild Awards

- 1995: Nominated, "Outstanding Performance by an Ensemble in a Comedy Series" – Northern Exposure

Young Artist Award

- 1983: Won, "Best Young Actress in the Daytime Series" – General Hospital

== Bibliography ==
- Holding Her Head High: Inspiration from 12 Single Mothers Who Championed Their Children and Changed History. Nashville, Tennessee: Thomas Nelson, 2008. ISBN 978-0-7852-2324-5
