= May Power =

Irish sculptor (1903–1993)

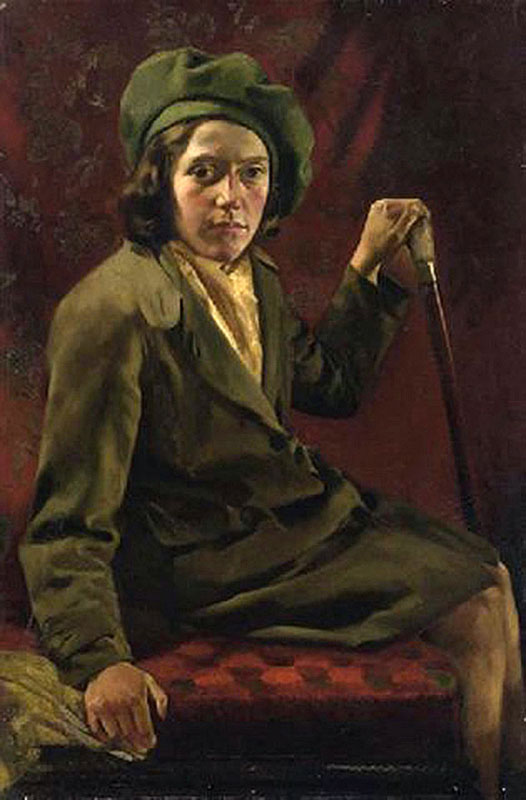
- Portrait of Power by Patrick Tuohy
- Born: 11 September 1903; Phibsborough, Ireland
- Died: 1993 (aged 89–90)
- Occupation: Sculptor

May Power (11 September 1903 – 1993) was an Irish sculptor.

== Early life and family ==
May Power was born in Dublin on 11 September 1903. Her parents were the sculptor Albert Power, and Agnes (née Kelly). She had 6 brothers and 3 sisters. Her younger brother, James, also went on to become a renowned sculptor. The family moved to 18 Geraldine Street, Phibsborough in early 1912, where Power's father established his stone carving business. Along with James, Power was taught the basics of modelling and carving by their father, and later both attended the Dublin Metropolitan School of Art (DMSA). While attending the DMSA, Power modelled for fellow artist Patrick Tuohy, sitting for him more than any other model. Power modelled for her father for his bronze statuette of Queen Tailte.

== Career ==
Power exhibited regularly with the Royal Hibernian Academy between 1933 and 1951. Her work was featured as part of the sculpture event in the art competition at the 1948 Summer Olympics. Power exhibited alongside Leo, Desmond and Irene Broe at the 1955 Institute of the Sculptors of Ireland exhibition in the Hugh Lane Gallery.

With her father, Power was a member of the Academy of Christian Art from its foundation in 1934. Through the Academy she both taught art and curated the large collection of religious images the group amassed, as well as serving as the honorary secretary. When her father died in 1945 before finishing a bust of Thomas Davis, Power painted the plaster model in bronze in time for the centenary celebration of Davis' birth. The Hugh Lane Gallery holds a bronze bust by Power of Joseph Holloway.
