= F. R. Higgins =

Irish poet (1896-1941)

Frederick Robert Higgins (24 April 1896 – 6 January 1941) was an Irish poet and theatre director.

== Early years ==
Higgins was born on the west coast of Ireland in Foxford, which is located in County Mayo. He was the eldest son of Joseph and Annie Higgins: his poem "Father and Son" is a loving tribute to his father. Joseph, a policeman, was stationed in Foxford at the time of his son's birth. He grew up in Ballivor in County Meath, ("our most lovely Meath" as he described it), where his family had farmed for several generations. He also spent time living in Dublin and attend Saint Columba's National School by North Strand Church. He spent the largest part of his adult life in Dublin, in a house he had built beside the River Dodder in Rathfarnham. His health was poor, and though his friends were inclined to regard him as a hypochondriac, his frequent predictions that he would die young proved to be accurate. He married Beatrice May Moore in 1921. The marriage was a happy one: even Frank O'Connor, who disliked him, praised him as a kind and considerate husband. He was however reputed to have had a number of affairs, notably with the actress Ria Mooney.

== Career ==
Higgins was a student of William Butler Yeats and served on the board of the Abbey Theatre from 1935 until his death. His best-known book of poetry is The Gap of Brightness (1940). He is also well known for his poem, "Father and Son." He wrote a moving elegy for his fellow poet Pádraic Ó Conaire. He was generally acknowledged to be a fine poet, but was less successful in his Abbey Theatre work: Frank O'Connor said unkindly that Higgins could not direct a children's poetry recitation. He died suddenly of a heart attack in January 1941.

In 1937 he was tour manager of the Abbey Theatre production of Teresa Deevy's Katie Roche which toured to the Ambassador Theatre (New York City), USA. There were five performances from 2 to 6 October. His Abbey career can be seen in the Abbey Theatre archives.

== Character ==
He was a popular and convivial man: even Frank O'Connor, who came to regard him with deep suspicion, admitted that he was a delightful person to know. His circle of friends included many of the leading Irish literary figures of his time, including Yeats, Padraic O Conaire, George William Russell, Lennox Robinson, and for a time Frank O'Connor. O'Connor however came to regard Higgins as untrustworthy and a troublemaker, and describes him unflatteringly in his memoir My Father's Son. For Yeats, Higgins seems to have felt a genuine affection, once remarking that he never left Yeats' house without "feeling like a thousand dollars". He was also capable of great kindness and generosity to younger writers like Patrick Kavanagh.

== Bibliography ==
His five collections of poems are:

- Salt Air (1923)
- Island Blood (1925)
- The Dark Breed (1927)
- Arable Holdings (1933)
- The Gap of Brightness (1940)

== Plays ==
- Katie Roche (1937) - (Tour Manager)
