= Amhrán na bhFiann =

National anthem of Ireland

Amhrán na bhFiann The Soldier's Song
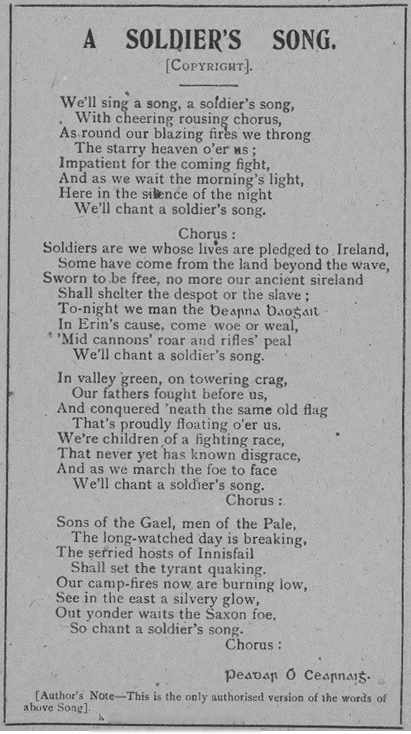
- English lyrics sheet, c. 1916
- National anthem of Ireland
- Also known as: "A Soldier's Song" (original)
- Lyrics: Peadar Kearney, 1909 (English version); Liam Ó Rinn, 1923 (Irish version)
- Music: Patrick Heeney, 1910
- Adopted: 12 July 1926

Audio sample
- U.S. Navy Band instrumental version: file; help

"Amhrán na bhFiann" (Irish pronunciation: [ˈəuɾˠaːn̪ˠ n̪ˠə ˈvʲiən̪ˠ]), or in English, "The Soldier's Song", is the national anthem of Ireland. The music was composed by Peadar Kearney and Patrick Heeney, the original English lyrics written by Kearney, and the Irish-language translation, now usually the version heard, by Liam Ó Rinn. The song has three verses, but only the choral refrain is used as the national anthem.

The Presidential Salute, played when the President of Ireland arrives at an official engagement, consists of the first four bars of the national anthem immediately followed by the last five.

== History ==
=== Origins ===
The song was originally written in English as "A Soldier's Song". It was composed "early in 1910 or late in 1909", (Note: While Sherry and de Burca give 1907 as the date of composition, Peadar Kearney in an August 1926 affidavit gives the later date.) with words by Peadar Kearney, and music by his childhood friend and neighbour Patrick Heeney, who had collaborated on songs since 1903. Kearney assisted Heeney in setting the refrain. Heeney composed it with his melodeon. Seán Rogan, later of the Irish Citizen Army, may also have helped with the music, and first wrote it in musical notation. Kearney wrote much of the text in the Swiss Café at the corner of O'Connell Street and North Earl Street. The first draft of the text, handwritten on copybook paper, sold at auction in Dublin in 2006 for €760,000. After being rejected by The United Irishman, Bulmer Hobson's magazine Irish Freedom published the text in 1912. Whelan and Son of Ormond Quay, Dublin, published the lyrics for sale as a flysheet. It was used as a marching song by the Irish Volunteers and Seamus Hughes first sang it in public at a Volunteer fundraising concert. It was sung by rebels in the General Post Office (GPO) during the Easter Rising of 1916. Its popularity increased among rebels held in Frongoch internment camp after the Rising.

The sheet music was first published in late 1916 by Whelan and Son, in an arrangement by Cathal Mac Dubhghaill (Cecil Grange MacDowell). In December 1916 in New York City, Victor Herbert published his own piano and orchestral arrangements under the title "Soldiers of Erin, the Rallying Song of the Irish Volunteers", on the instigation of R. F. O'Reilly, an Irish priest. O'Reilly arranged for proceeds to go to the Gaelic League, but paid royalties to Kearney and Heeney once he discovered they were the authors. With later cheques from the US, Kearney earned "not much more than £100". The song's first commercial recording was made in New York City in early 1917 by George Potter and commissioned by Ellen Byrne De Witt, a prominent Irish-American businesswoman. Margaret Skinnider, in her 1917 memoir of the rising, called it the "Volunteer Marching Song" and (incorrectly) said "I have been told the men in the rising of '67 also sang it."

By 1917, according to Séumas Robinson, the song was being parodied by British soldiers in Ireland. Éamon de Valera's platform at the June 1917 East Clare by-election featured a large banner with the opening two lines. That October the Irish Volunteers allied with Sinn Féin under de Valera and during the Irish War of Independence (1919–21) the Volunteers evolved into the Irish Republican Army (IRA). The song's popularity led to its being called the "Sinn Féin anthem". Copies were confiscated by British security forces as seditious. Carl Hardebeck played it unannounced on Low Sunday 1918 in St Peter's Cathedral, Belfast. Victor Herbert's version was well known to Irish Americans by 1919, when de Valera arrived as President of Dáil Éireann of the self-proclaimed Irish Republic. In the 1922–23 Civil War, the IRA split into the "National Army" of the nascent Irish Free State and the "Irregulars" loyal to the defunct Republic. Both sides continued to sing "The Soldier's Song". After the war, it remained popular as an Army tune, and was played at many military functions.

=== Official adoption ===
The Irish national anthem played on RTÉ during the 1960s

The Free State did not initially adopt any official state anthem. The delicate political state in the aftermath of the Civil War provoked a desire to avoid controversy. Ex-unionists continued to regard "God Save the King" as the national anthem, as it had been for the rest of the British Empire. For nationalists, the fact that "The Soldier's Song" described Irishmen fighting a foreign foe allowed it to overlook the painful memory of the Civil War. W. T. Cosgrave, 1922–32 President of the Executive Council, avoided explicitly making it the national anthem for fear of exacerbating the antipathy for the Free State held by unionists in Northern Ireland. On the other hand, the government did not want to disassociate the state from the anthem for fear of leaving a potent symbol available for its republican opponents to claim. The same equivocation hung around the status of the Irish tricolour.

"The Soldier's Song" was widely, if unofficially, sung by nationalists. Public perception that it was officially recognised sprang from a concert on 3 February 1924 at the Theatre Royal, Dublin by the Army Music School under its German-born director, Colonel Fritz Brase. As an encore to the concert, Brasé conducted "Irish March, no.1", his medley of Irish patriotic airs, which ended with that of "The Soldier's Song". Most dignitaries present stood up at this point, including Governor-General Tim Healy, Cosgrave and most of the Executive Council, although Richard Mulcahy remained seated. On 28 April 1924, Cosgrave expressed opposition to replacing "The Soldier's Song", which was provisionally used within the State. Sean Lester, publicist at the Department of External Affairs considered "The Soldier's Song" to be "hardly suitable in words or music" and favoured the music, though not the words, of "Let Erin Remember". This was used as the anthem for the state at the 1924 Olympics in Paris, (Note: The state did not win any medals, but "Let Erin Remember" was played before the football team's matches.) and other events abroad for the next two years. The Dublin Evening Mail held contests in 1924 and 1925 to find verses for a new anthem; the first produced no sufficiently good entry, and the second's winning entry was soon forgotten.

There was concern that the lack of an official anthem was giving unionists an opportunity to persist with "God Save the King". Ewan Morris writes, "While some, perhaps many, nationalists undoubtedly disliked 'The soldier's song', few would have objected so strongly as to refuse to honour it as the national anthem. But for ex-unionists 'The soldier's song' remained anathema, and 'God save the king' continued to be the national anthem they honoured." By 1926 foreign diplomats' protocol offices were requesting copies of the anthem's score. On 12 July 1926, the Executive Council decided to adopt it as the National Anthem, with Cosgrave the driving force in the decision. He wrote to Lester, "there must be uniformity in regard to the national anthem and that for the present the 'Soldier's song' is to be used for this purpose both at home and abroad". The decision was not publicised. On 20 July 1926, Osmond Esmonde asked President Cosgrave what the National Anthem was, but the Ceann Comhairle Michael Hayes ruled 'If the Deputy desires to investigate any problem in regard to the National Anthem, he cannot ask a question of the President. The President cannot be asked to define what is the National Anthem. It is not part of his functions.' Esmonde instead asked Minister for Defence Peter Hughes what 'as far as the Army is concerned' was the National Anthem. The draft response provided for Hughes stated that 'while no final decision has been come to', "The Soldier's Song" was 'at present accepted as the National Anthem', However, this wording was vetoed by Cosgrave, and in the Dáil chamber Hughes responded simply 'The "Soldier's Song."'

In 1928, the Army band established the practice of playing only the chorus of the song as the Anthem, because the longer version was discouraging audiences from singing along. Also in 1928, Chief Justice Hugh Kennedy, returning from an official trip to North America, reported that an official arrangement of the music was "very badly needed" for circulation abroad. This was produced in July 1929 by Fritz Brase. This consisted only of the chorus, and was published under the title "The Soldier's Song" rather than "A Soldier's Song", although variants such as the "Soldiers' Song" continued to occur in later official documentation.

=== Copyright ===
The national anthem was played at closedown by Radio Éireann from its inception in 1926. The Catholic Truth Society of Ireland included it in a 1929 publication commemorating the centenary of the Roman Catholic Relief Act 1829. Cinemas and theatres played the anthem when closing from 1932 until 1972. (Note: Correspondence in The Irish Times in 1969 suggested the abbreviated Presidential salute was then being played rather than the full anthem.) Peadar Kearney, who had received royalties from sheet music publishers, issued legal proceedings for royalties from those now performing the anthem. He was joined by Michael Heeney, brother of Patrick Heeney, who had died in 1911. In 1934, the Department of Finance acquired the copyright of the song for the sum of £1,200 (£980 to the copyright holders plus £220 expenses). Copyright law changed in the 1950s, (Note: The year 1959 is given by Sherry, citing minister James Ryan when introducing the 1965 change. However, Eoin O'Dell surmises that the change referred to was section 9 of the Industrial and Commercial Property (Protection) (Amendment) Act, 1957.) such that the government had to reacquire copyright in 1965, for £2,500. Ruth Sherry states that it is unclear whether the official anthem is the music alone or the text also; however, the official 1934 Estimate of the amount required ... for the acquisition by the state of copyright in the national anthem includes the line item, 'Payment to the holders of copyright in the words and music of the "Soldier's Song"' [emphasis added]. While the state held the copyright, most requests for publication were accepted, "although several of a purely commercial nature, such as its use in advertisements, were refused". As per EU copyright law, the English lyrics' copyright expired on 1 January 2013, following the 70th anniversary of Kearney's death. (Note: The copyright in the Irish translation has also expired: either on 1 January 2014, being 70 years after Ó Rinn's death, or on 1 January 1974, being 50 years from its publication; the latter applies if Ó Rinn translated it in his capacity as a public servant.) In 2016, three Fianna Fáil senators introduced a private member's bill intended to restore the state's copyright in the anthem. (Note: Originally Bill 19 of 2016; reintroduced after that year's general election as Bill 62 of 2016.) The ending of copyright also encourage the Seanad to announce a public consultation on the anthem.

=== Official salute ===
==== Governor-General ====
The Governor-General of the Irish Free State was the King's representative and, as such, unionists considered that the appropriate official salute to play was "God Save The King" rather than the Free State Anthem. At James McNeill's 1928 inauguration, the Army band played "The Soldier's Song", but that summer, at two events with unionist organisers, he was greeted by "God Save The King". The Executive Council advised him that in future the Free State anthem must be played. McNeill declined a June 1929 invitation to the Trinity College sports when the college insisted that the British anthem was its tradition. Unionists and people in Great Britain took this as a snub, while for republican commentators it encapsulated the Free State's attempts to suppress the truth about its subservience to Britain. A compromise adopted in 1931 was that "The Soldier's Song" would mark the Governor General's arrival and he would leave before the end of the sports, when "God Save The King" would be played. Following the 1932 general election, Éamon de Valera became President of the Executive Council; as part of his campaign to abolish the office of Governor-General, he forbade the Army band from playing "The Soldier's Song" in McNeill's presence.

==== President ====
The first ceremonial regulations for the Irish Defence Forces, drawn up in 1926, provided that the official "Presidential Salute" for the President of the Executive Council would be the first and last eight bars of the national anthem. The 1937 Constitution renamed the head of government Taoiseach, and introduced the office of President of Ireland. The "Presidential Salute" has since 1937 been used for the President of Ireland, who as head of state takes precedence over the Taoiseach. The Taoiseach's salute is "Mór Chluana", an old Irish air to which Osborn Bergin set "Amhrán Dóchais", which in the 1930s was often suggested as a replacement national anthem.

=== Irish version ===
The Irish translation was written by Liam Ó Rinn (1886–1943), later the Chief Translator of the Oireachtas, who was involved in the Irish versions of both the 1922 Constitution and the 1937 Constitution. Although Sherry says the Irish version was first published in An tÓglach (the magazine of the Irish Defence Forces) on 3 November 1923, an almost identical text was printed in the Freeman's Journal on 3 April 1923, under Ó Rinn's pen name "Coinneach". It may have been written as early as 1917. Ó Rinn's grandson Nial claims Liam started work on a translation while interned in Frongoch after the 1916 Rising. Several other translations had been made by 1923, which Ó Rinn criticised as unreadable. These were in literary Classical Irish, whereas Ó Rinn favoured the living vernacular spoken in Gaeltacht areas. On the other hand, Ó Rinn's Irish was a second language which some native speakers found inelegant. "Rosc Catha na nÓglach", T. F. O'Rahilly's translation, was used by Conradh na Gaeilge in the early 1920s; in 1924, Padraig de Burca said it "deserves more favour than it has received". Other translations included one sung by Claisceadal in University College Galway in December 1931, and others by Pádraig Mac Cárthaigh, Sean Dubhthaigh, Seamus Mac Grianna, and Ernest Blythe. From the 1930s, the Gaelic Athletic Association (GAA) encouraged singing the anthem in Irish at its matches. The text of the Ó Rinn version was printed in 1933 in An Camán, (Note: An Camán was the joint official magazine of the GAA and Conradh na Gaeilge, an Irish-language organisation.) and in the programs of GAA matches at Croke Park, where the crowd was led via the public address system by singers from St Patrick's College of Education and Conradh na Gaeilge, led by Seán Ó Síocháin. Also in 1933 Eamonn O'Neill suggested in the Dáil that schoolchildren should be taught the words in both English and Irish. In 1935 Charles Bewley, Irish envoy to Germany, requested Irish lyrics because "the English text ... makes a bad impression abroad".

Both the English and Irish texts appeared in various editions of Facts about Ireland, published by the Department of Foreign Affairs, and on the official website of the Department of the Taoiseach. However, no Irish version has been officially adopted, the state does not hold the copyright to any Irish version, and Ó Rinn, unlike Kearney and Heeney's estate, never received royalties. A memorandum in the Department of the Taoiseach on 5 April 1958 discussed five distinct Irish translations, noting that Ó Rinn's was the best known; it suggested that, if it were to be officially endorsed, the spelling and grammar should be standardised and the opening words "Sinne Fianna Fáil" changed to "Sinne laochra Fáil" to avoid association with the Fianna Fáil political party. The 2018 Seanad report on the anthem recommended no change to the wording, and pointed out that the law would not prevent a new political party adopting revised words like "Laochra Fáil" as its name. (Note: The relevant law is section 25(5) of the Electoral Act 1992, as substituted by section 11 of the Electoral (Amendment) Act, 2001.) The first recording of the anthem sung in Irish was on Argo Records in 1965 by Our Lady's Choral Society, Dublin, and the Radio Éireann Symphony Orchestra.

== Modern use ==
The English version has been almost totally eclipsed, and many are unaware that the Irish lyrics are a translation. In 1960 it was remarked that the anthem's effect at Croke Park was impaired by the fact that some people sang in English and others in Irish. The Irish Times reported audience participation at a 1962 concert in the Olympia Theatre, Dublin under the headline "Sang National Anthem in Irish". Frank Ormsby's 2017 poem "The National Anthem" parodies the Irish text (Buíon dár slua becomes "Binned. Arse. Loo.") which about 1960 he uncomprehendingly learnt by rote in a Catholic school in Northern Ireland. In the 21st century the English version is still sung at home matches of Celtic F.C., a Glasgow Irish-Scots football club. The English version was sung in Canada during a state visit by President Mary McAleese in 1998, and at the 2004 Ryder Cup in the United States. The latter prompted objections from Fáilte Ireland, and what Gaeltacht Minister Éamon Ó Cuív called "an outcry" from viewers in Ireland. A 2002 public sculpture of Kearney includes the Irish lyrics rather than Kearney's. The 2018 Seanad report suggested that "For those not familiar with the Irish language, it may be appropriate to produce a phonetic version of the National Anthem". Some foreign-born Irish international sportspeople have learned the Irish words via ad hoc phonetic versions, including Mick McCarthy of the association football team and CJ Stander of the rugby union team.

In 1987, the anthem was recommended, but not required, to be taught as part of the civics syllabus in national schools. Fianna Fáil's manifesto in the 2007 general election promised to "include the national anthem in the primary school curriculum". As of 2017 the primary school Social Personal and Health Education curriculum includes being "aware" of the anthem in third/fourth class, and "respecting" it in fifth/sixth class. Richard Bruton, the Minister for Education stated that it was "not Departmental policy to impose regulations on schools regarding national expression", but that it had supported several initiatives which included the national anthem. To mark the 2016 centenary of the Easter Rising, members of the Defence Forces visited each national school and presented it with a national flag and copies of the national anthem and the 1916 Proclamation. A 2017 opinion poll found 82% supported teaching the anthem in school; 40% claimed to know all the words and 40% "some" of them. The 2018 Seanad report said the anthem was "indeed currently on the curriculum at primary school level. However, once it has been taught at primary school level there are little [sic] opportunities for students to use the National Anthem within the school environment". It said suggestions to sing the anthem at school every day "may not be possible", but school children could be encouraged to sing it on the eve (Note: Saint Patrick's Day is a public holiday in Ireland on which schools are closed.) of Saint Patrick's Day. Making the teaching of the anthem mandatory was proposed again in 2025, by Conor D. McGuinness of Sinn Féin.

Although only the chorus forms the official national anthem, the music of both verse and chorus has often been played at sports events outside Ireland. The text of the first verse appears as well as the chorus in early (1960s) editions of the Department of External Affairs's book Facts About Ireland. Later editions include only the chorus.

The song is used by many Irish nationalists as an anthem for the entire island of Ireland. As such it is played at all GAA matches, including those in Northern Ireland and overseas. The 2018 Seanad report on the anthem recommended awareness of the anthem among "Irish citizens at home and abroad, as well as new citizens of Ireland". It was common in the twentieth century, and not unknown today, for a music session in a pub to end at closing time with the playing of the national anthem. A 1961 Evening Herald editorial complained that the anthem was played "far too often" and "usually in a most undignified manner", and that it "should be limited to very special occasions".

There is no protocol specified for the anthem; the 2018 Seanad report on the anthem recommended adopting one and provided a draft. The flag protocol issued by the Department of the Taoiseach states that when the anthem is played in the presence of the national flag, all present should face the flag and stand to attention, and Defence Forces personnel should salute the flag, "until the last note of the music". History professor Caoimhín De Barra comments, "I don't think I have ever seen anyone salute the flag during Amhrán na bhFiann. Certainly, nobody is standing to attention until the last note of music, given that we have effectively replaced the last line of the song with collective freestyle screaming and roaring."

In 2017, the Seanad Public Consultation Committee invited comments on "the most appropriate way the State should treat the National Anthem". Its chair, Mark Daly, said, "The debate around this issue includes aspects of copyright law, cultural tolerance, respect for national symbols, public opinion, free speech and a range of other factors." The committee published 71 of the submissions received, several of whose authors were invited to its hearings on 5 December 2017. Michael W. D'Arcy said the government favoured guidelines rather than legislation, and that penalties for misuse might prove counterproductive. The committee's report was published in July 2018; it recommended producing an official translation into Irish Sign Language (ISL). A deaf choir performed an ISL version of the anthem in Leinster House at the report's official launch. In January 2019, Fianna Fáil senators introduced a private member's bill "to confirm that the choral refrain, with or without the lyrics, of 'Amhrán na bhFiann' or, in the English Language, 'The Soldier's Song' is and continues to be the National Anthem; to provide for a version of the National Anthem in the Irish Sign Language; [and] to confirm that the Presidential Salute is and continues to be the music of the first 4 bars, followed by the last 4 bars, of the National Anthem". The bill lapsed on the Dáil's 2020 dissolution. During the 2021 COVID-19 lockdown, RTÉ published a guide by Bishopstown Community School to assist schoolchildren learning the anthem's ISL version.

== Debate ==
Suggestions to replace the anthem are reported regularly. In the 1933 Dáil debate on the state's acquisition of the song's copyright, there was discussion of its merits or lack thereof. Frank MacDermot said, 'Leaving out sentiment, I must confess, from both a literary and a musical point of view, I would regard the "Soldier's Song" as, shall we say, a jaunty little piece of vulgarity, and I think we could have done a lot better.' Thomas F. O'Higgins responded, "National Anthems come about, not because of the suitability of the particular words or notes, but because they are adopted generally by the nation. That is exactly how the "Soldier's Song" became a National Anthem in this country. It happened to be the Anthem on the lips of the people when they came into their own and when the outsiders evacuated the country and left the insiders here to make the best or the worst of the country. It was adopted by the people here before ever it was adopted by the Executive Council". Fintan O'Toole called it "Edwardian English music hall jingo".

The Irish version is a free translation of the English; Richard Parfitt says it tones down some of the original's militancy. "Sinne Fianna Fáil" (Note: Literally "We are the Fianna [see Fenian Cycle] of Fál [see Lia Fáil]") is not a literal translation of "Soldiers are we". Fianna Fáil, variously translated as "Soldiers of Destiny", "Warriors of Fál", "Warriors of Destiny", "The Irish Army", or "Soldiers of Ireland", Éamon de Valera regarded the phrase's untranslatability as a virtue. This is from the Irish Fianna ("bands of warriors") of Fál (a coronation stone, and metonymically "Ireland"). As an Irish name for the Irish Volunteers, it was an alternative to Óglaigh na hÉireann. The initials "FF" appeared on the Volunteer badge, and remain on that of Irish Defence Forces as successor to the Volunteers. On 2 April 1926, "Fianna Fáil" was chosen as the name of Éamon de Valera's new political party. Ó Rinn's version appeared in a 1927 volume of poetry with a foreword by de Valera. Since the Irish version of the anthem became popular in the 1930s, there has been intermittent resentment of the party name's occurring in it. Publishers Browne & Nolan printed a version in 1938 substituting "Sinne laochra Fáil" for "Sinne Fianna Fáil" (laochra, 'heroes, warriors'), which is occasionally heard instead. TD Maureen O'Sullivan likewise favoured changing to "laochra Fáil". In the Dáil in 2011 and 2012, she asked the Minister for Finance Michael Noonan whether "Sinne Fianna Fáil" was "appropriate and correct" or had "party political connotations"; Noonan stated it was appropriate and had no such connotations, given that the translation predated the party's founding. The 2018 Seanad report on the anthem took the same view. Mícheál Ó Súilleabháin said the Irish lyrics sound worse than the English ones, which rhyme and so are easier to learn. Ó Súilleabháin has also written that the national anthem is "in effect an ungainly pastiche in the style of a British march".

Ulster unionists regard the anthem as specific to the Republic of Ireland, not symbolic of the whole island of Ireland, and deprecate its use with United Ireland symbolism as irredentism. The symbolism of flags in Northern Ireland raises similar issues: in 1933, the unionist government invoked its Special Powers Act to ban public display of the tricolour when "representing the Irish Republican Army ... an Irish Republic ... or... any ... unlawful association"; the order was interpreted as a ban in all circumstances unless flown explicitly to represent the Free State. Similar orders specifically banning "The Soldier's Song" were drafted before the 1935 Westminster and 1938 Stormont elections, but the government felt they were too controversial to implement; a general order against music "likely to lead to a breach of the peace" was often invoked when "The Soldier's Song" was played. After the Northern Ireland peace process, when unionists and Conservatives began attending GAA matches in their official capacity, they arrived after the playing of "Amhrán na bhFiann", including sports minister Edwin Poots in 2008, First Minister Peter Robinson in 2012, and Northern Ireland Secretary James Brokenshire in 2017. Robinson's successor Arlene Foster stood for the anthem at the 2018 Ulster Football Final, which was played in the Republic.

F. Gunther Eyck's survey of national anthems classifies "Amhrán na bhFiann" under "resistance anthems", alongside "La Marseillaise", "A Portuguesa", and "Poland Is Not Yet Lost". The lyrics have been criticised by some commentators for alleged outdatedness, militarism, and anti-British sentiment. Others deny such faults or attribute them to national anthems generally. Richard Parfitt remarks of the lyrics that "few who sing it really wish to stand amidst 'cannon's roar' against the 'Saxon foe'". Kevin Myers described calls for the anthem to be amended or replaced as "seasonal as spring". Questions in the Dáil have been asked by Frank MacDermot in 1932; Noel Lemass in 1973; Trevor Sargent in 1993; Derek McDowell in 1995; and John Browne in 2000. Commentators on the 1929 Trinity College incident suggested "The Soldier's Song" would be an impediment to closer ties between the Free State and Northern Ireland. The executive of arts body Aosdána rejected a 1989 proposal by Aloys Fleischmann to campaign for a change of anthem, on the basis that it was a political rather than an artistic question. In 1995, during the Northern Ireland peace process, Taoiseach John Bruton suggested at the Forum for Peace and Reconciliation that the anthem be changed, with Fianna Fáil and Sinn Féin disagreeing. The Forum drafted an unpublished report on "obstacles to reconciliation in the Republic"; 1998 newspaper articles summarising the draft claimed it suggested "the government could commission alternative anthems for sporting and other non-official occasions" which were not "excessively militaristic". In 1996 Fergus McCann responded to sectarianism in Glasgow by banning Celtic F.C. terrace chants of Irish rebel songs; "The Soldier's Song" was specifically excluded from the ban. A 2017 opinion poll found 84% supported retaining the anthem, while 10% favoured replacing it. Historian Fearghal McGarry suggests the fact that the lyrics are no longer sung in English dampens demand for change: "public unfamiliarity with Peadar Kearney's original words has almost certainly extended his song's shelf life as the national anthem".

In a debate during the 2011 presidential election, candidates were asked whether the anthem was "fit for purpose". Most acknowledged strong public attachment to it. Martin McGuinness and Dana Rosemary Scallon opposed any change. Mary Davis said people "shouldn't consider changing it lightly". Michael D. Higgins suggested the Constitutional Convention could discuss the matter. Seán Gallagher had "mixed views" and was "open to explore revising it". David Norris said other anthems were more "blood-thirsty". The 2018 Seanad report on the anthem recommended no change to the wording.

== Alternatives ==
The previous anthem used by Irish nationalists was "God Save Ireland", with words written by Timothy Daniel Sullivan in 1867 to the tune of "Tramp! Tramp! Tramp!", an American Civil War song written in 1864 by George Frederick Root. "God Save Ireland" commemorated the Manchester Martyrs, executed in 1867 for felony murder for their part in an Irish Republican Brotherhood ambush, and it quickly replaced the previous unofficial anthem, "A Nation Once Again", written in 1845 by Thomas Davis of the Young Ireland movement. "God Save Ireland" was associated with the Irish Parliamentary Party and its eclipse by "The Soldier's Song" after 1916 mirrored the party's eclipse by Sinn Féin.

The Irish Rugby Football Union (IRFU) and the Ireland national rugby union team are all-island bodies with many unionist supporters; although "Amhrán na bhFiann" is played at Ireland matches in the Republic, it is not played elsewhere, and unionist players are not expected to sing it. During the Troubles, no anthem was played at matches outside Ireland. In Paris, "The Last Rose of Summer" was played in 1929, and before the 1931 match the Department of External Affairs advised ambassador Gerald O'Kelly de Gallagh that, if the organisers refused to allow "The Soldier's Song", then "appropriate Irish airs would be 'St. Patrick's Day', 'The Last Rose of Summer' or 'Let Erin Remember'". At the inaugural Rugby World Cup, captain Donal Lenihan objected that all other teams would have an anthem. At the last minute before the side's opening match in Athletic Park, Wellington, a James Last cassette recording of "The Rose of Tralee" was borrowed from Phil Orr; the music and poor recording quality attracted much criticism and no anthem was played for later matches. At the 1991 World Cup, there was no anthem away to Scotland, Ireland's only game outside Dublin.

For the 1995 World Cup in South Africa, the IRFU decided to commission a song from Phil Coulter. His composition, "Ireland's Call", has since been played alongside "Amhrán na bhFiann" at matches within the Republic, and on its own elsewhere, including in Northern Ireland. Other all-island teams have adopted "Ireland's Call" for similar reasons to the IRFU's. The men's and women's hockey teams adopted it in 2000, having previously used the "Londonderry Air"; however, a first-ever Olympic qualification saw the Olympic Council of Ireland standard "Amhrán na bhFiann" used at Rio 2016. Some sports use no anthem, including badminton and bowls. Criticism that "Ireland's Call" was uninspiring prompted The Irish Times to commission a jocular "alternanthem" from The Duckworth Lewis Method for Saint Patrick's Day 2010.

A recording of "O'Donnell Abú" was played for the Irish showjumping team at a 1937 competition in Paris; ambassador Art O'Brien threatened a diplomatic incident since the other teams' anthems had been played by a military band. The organisers had been unable to locate a copy of the score, and the Irish embassy had only a piano arrangement. The same air was chosen by the women's hockey team for a 1951 away match against the Netherlands.

"The Fields of Athenry" was adopted as a terrace chant by Irish fans at the 1990 FIFA World Cup and later by fans of the rugby team. It has been described as a "de facto national sporting anthem" and "unofficial national anthem".

== Music ==
The air is of a style comparable with British marches and songs of the era. Colm Ó Lochlainn said, "The tune is not Irish; it sounds to me something between a Sousa march and a German regimental song". It is usually sung or played in march time. Different tempos may be used, however, and the verse and chorus are occasionally played. In 1926 the radio orchestra of 2RN was found too small for an adequate rendition, so a recording by the New York "Fighting Irish" 69th Infantry was soon adopted, prompting complaints that it was too jazz-influenced. A 1961 Evening Herald editorial complained that the anthem was "usually played without any arrangement and often at a tempo more suggestive of a jig tune than an anthem". Fritz Brase's 1930 arrangement was replaced for Defence Forces bands in the 1980s by one by Colonel James R. McGee which simplified the high woodwind parts. Raidió Teilifís Éireann (RTÉ), the Irish national broadcasting company, played an orchestral version in a slow tempo at the close of transmission from 1962 onwards. This was produced by Gerard Victory and arranged by Brian Boydell (who disliked the tune) on the advice of a Canadian consultant who said, "I wan' it BIG! I envisage the kind of music that will stir the hearts of the Irish people". Boydell's version replaced one by John Francis Larchet introduced in 1954. A special arrangement incorporating traditional Irish instruments was played instead during Easter Week 1966, to mark the 50th anniversary of the Easter Rising. There was negative comment at the lively tempo used in the ceremony for Michelle Smith's gold medals at the 1996 Olympics. The 1965 Argo version was in E♭ major instead of the usual B♭ major. Bill Whelan commented, “I have long felt the original melody for our anthem delivers on all fronts: dignity, sing-ability, and emotional impact".

== Lyrics ==
The lyrics are those of an Irish rebel song, exhorting all Irish people (both "Gaels" and "men of the Pale") to participate in the struggle to end the hegemony ("despot" over "slave") of the English ("Saxon foe") in Ireland ("Inisfail"). There are allusions to earlier Irish rebellions, and to support from Irish Americans ("from a land beyond the wave") such as Clan na Gael. Eyck attributes the song's rise to popularity to its "down-to-earth lines, descriptive imagery, fighting stance, and patriotic passion".

The original Irish translation by Ó Rinn used distinctly Munster Irish spelling, however, slight variations exist in modern published versions; in the following texts, the chorus is from the 2018 Seanad report; and the verses are based on National Anthems of the World (6th edition) with Irish spellings altered to the standard, An Caighdeán Oifigiúil; however, the original Munster spellings are still in common usage.

=== Chorus ===
Only the chorus is the established national anthem.

Irish translation

Sinne Fianna Fáil,
atá faoi (Note: Rather than the standard Irish forms faoi and faoin, National Anthems of the World has fé and fé'n respectively, which reflects the Munster Irish variants used in the originally published lyrics.) gheall ag Éirinn,
Buíon dár slua
thar toinn do ráinig chugainn,
Faoi mhóid bheith saor
Seantír ár sinsear feasta,
Ní fhágfar faoin tíorán ná faoin tráill.
Anocht a théam sa bhearna bhaoil,
Le gean ar Ghaeil, chun báis nó saoil, (Note: Literal translation: "For love of the Gael, towards death or life")
Le gunna-scréach faoi lámhach na bpiléar,
Seo libh canaig' (Note: canaíg or canaidh, the form used in the original Irish translation of the song published by Ó Rinn is a Munster Irish variant of the standard form canaigí. As the standard form would not fit the meter the unusual form canaig' used by The Department of the Taoiseach is evidently an abbreviation of canaigí.) amhrán na bhFiann.

IPA transcription

[ˈʃɪ.n̠ʲə ˈfʲi(ə).n̪ˠə ˈfˠɑːlʲ]
[ə.ˈt̪ˠɑː fˠiː ˈjɑːl̪ˠ əɟ ˈeː.ɾʲən̠ʲ]
[ˈbˠiːnˠ ˈd̪ˠɑːɾˠ ˈsˠl̪ˠu(ə)]
[haɾˠ ˈt̪ˠɪn̠ʲ d̪ˠɔ ˈɾˠɑː.nʲɪɟ ˈxuː(ɡə)nʲ]
[ˈfˠiː ˈwoːdʲ vʲɪ(h) ˈsˠeːɾˠ]
[ʃanˠ.ˈtʲiːɾʲ ɑːɾˠ ˈʃiːn̠ʲ.ʃəɾˠ ˈfʲasˠ.t̪ˠə]
[n̠ʲiː ˈɑːk.ˈ(f)ˠəɾˠ fˠiːnʲ ˈtʲiː.ɾˠɑːn̪ˠ ˈn̪ˠɑː fˠiːnʲ ˈt̪ˠɾˠɑːlʲ]
[a.ˈn̪ˠɔxt̪ˠ ə ˈheːmˠ sˠə ˈvʲɑːɾˠ.n̪ˠə ˈwiːlʲ]
[lʲe ˈɟanˠ aɾʲ ˈɣeːlʲ | xʊnˠ ˈbˠɑːʃ n̪ˠoː ˈsˠiːlʲ]
[lʲə ˈɡʊ.n̪ˠə ˈʃcɾʲeːx fˠiː ˈl̪ˠɑː.wəx nˠə bʲi.ˈlʲeːɾˠ]
[ʃɔ lʲɪvʲ ˈka.n̪ˠiːɟ əu.ˈɾˠɑːn̪ˠ n̪ˠə ˈvʲi(ə)n̪ˠ]

English original

Soldiers are we,
whose lives are pledged to Ireland,
Some have come
from a land beyond the wave,
Sworn to be free,
no more our ancient sireland,
Shall shelter the despot or the slave.
Tonight we man the bearna bhaoil, (Note: Kearney's original, otherwise English, text, includes bearna bhaoil, Irish for "gap of danger".)
In Erin's cause, come woe or weal,
'Mid cannons' roar and rifles' peal,
We'll chant a soldier's song.

=== Original verses ===
The anthem consists only of the chorus of the song. The original has three verses, set to a slightly different tune, with the following lyrics:

Irish translation

Seo dhíbh, a chairde, duan Óglaigh
Caithréimeach bríomhar ceolmhar
Ár dtinte cnámh go buacach táid
'S an spéir go mín réaltógach
Is fonnmhar faobhrach sinn chun gleo
'S go tiúnmhar glé roimh thíocht don ló
Fé chiúnas chaomh na hoíche ar seol
Seo libh, canaídh Amhrán na bhFiann.

Curfá

Cois bánta réidhe, ar ardaibh sléibhe
Ba bhuadhach ár sinsir romhainn
Ag lámhach go tréan fén sárbhrat séin
'Tá thuas sa ghaoth go seolta
Ba dhúchas riamh dár gcine cháidh
Gan iompáil siar ó imirt áir
'S ag siúl mar iad i gcoinne námhad (Note: Can be sung in the contracted form ná'd [ˈnˠɑːd̪ˠ])
Seo libh, canaídh Amhrán na bhFiann

Curfá

A bhuíon nach fann d'fhuil Ghaeil is Gall
Sin breacadh lae na saoirse
Tá sceimhle 's scanradh i gcroíthe námhad
Roimh ranna laochra ár dtíre
Ár dtinte is tréith gan spréach anois
Sin luisne ghlé sa spéir anoir
'S an bíobha i raon na bpiléar agaibh
Seo libh, canaídh Amhrán na bhFiann

Curfá

IPA transcription (Note: Although the song is written in Munster Irish, this transcription is based mainly on the phonology of Connacht Irish for consistency. See the article for Irish orthography for further details.)

[ʃɔ ˈjiːvʲ | ə ˈxɑːɾʲ.dʲə | ˈd̪ˠuən̪ˠ oː.ˈglˠiː]
[kə.ˈɾʲeː.mʲəx ˈbʲɾʲiː.wəɾˠ ˈcoːl̪ˠ.wəɾˠ]
[ɑːɾˠ ˈdʲɪn̠ʲ.tʲə ˈknˠɑːw ɡɔ bˠu(ə).kax ˈt̪ˠɑːdʲ]
[sˠ‿ənˠ ˈsˠpʲeːɾʲ ɡɔ ˈmʲiːnʲ ɾʲeːlˠ.ˈt̪ˠoː.ɡəx]
[isˠ ˈfˠoːn̪ˠ.wəɾˠ ˈfˠiːw.ɾˠəx ˈʃɪn̠ʲ xun̪ˠ ˈɟlʲoː]
[sˠ‿gə ˈtʲuːn̪ˠ.wəɾˠ ˈɟlʲeː ɾˠɪvʲ ˈhiːxt̪ˠ d̪ˠɔnˠ ˈl̪ˠoː]
[fʲeː ˈçuː.n̪ˠəsˠ ˈxiːw n̪ˠə ˈhiː.ç(ə)‿aɾˠ ˈʃoːlˠ]
[ʃɔ lʲɪvʲ | ˈka.n̪ˠiː(ɟ) əu.ˈɾˠɑːn̪ˠ n̪ˠə ˈvʲi(ə)n̪ˠ]

[kuɾˠ.fˠɑː]

[kɔʃ ˈbˠɑːn̪ˠ.t̪ˠa ˈɾʲeːj(ə) | əɾˠ ˈɑːɾˠd̪ˠiː ˈʃlʲeːvʲ(ə)]
[bˠə ˈwu(ə)x ɑːɾˠ ˈʃɪnʲ.ʃɪɾʲ ˈɾˠoː.wən̠ʲ]
[əɡ ˈl̪ˠɑː.wəx ɡɔ ˈtʲɾʲeːnˠ fʲeːnʲ ˈsˠɑːɾˠ.(ə.)wɾˠat̪ˠ ˈʃeːnʲ]
[t̪ˠɑː ˈhuəsˠ sˠa ˈɣiː(h) ɡɔ ˈʃoːlˠt̪ˠa]
[bˠə ˈɣuː.xəsˠ ˈɾˠiəw d̪ˠɑːɾˠ ˈɟɪ.nʲə ˈxɑː]
[ɡan̪ˠ ˈʊmˠ.pˠɑːlʲ ˈʃiəɾˠ oː ˈɪ.mʲəɾʲtʲ ˈɑːɾʲ]
[sˠ‿əɡ ˈʃuːl̪ˠ mˠaɾˠ ˈiəd̪ˠ i ˈgɪ.n̠ʲə ˈnˠɑː(.wa)d̪ˠ]
[ʃɔ lʲɪvʲ | ˈka.n̪ˠiː(ɟ) əu.ˈɾˠɑːn̪ˠ n̪ˠə ˈvʲi(ə)n̪ˠ]

[kuɾˠ.fˠɑː]

[ə ˈwiːnˠ nˠax ˈfˠɑːn̪ˠ d̪ˠ‿ɪlʲ ˈɣeːlʲ isˠ ˈɡɑːlˠ]
[ʃɪnʲ ˈbʲɾʲa.kə ˈl̪ˠeː n̪ˠə ˈsˠiːɾˠ.ʃə]
[t̪ˠɑː ˈʃcɪvʲ.lʲə sˠ‿ˈsˠkɑːnˠ.ɾˠ(ə)‿i ˈɡɾˠiː.hə ˈnˠɑː(.wa)d̪ˠ]
[ɾˠɪvʲ ˈɾˠɑː.n̪ˠa ˈl̪ˠiːx.ɾˠ(ə)‿ɑːɾˠ ˈdʲiː.ɾʲə]
[ɑːɾˠ ˈdʲɪn̠ʲ.tʲ(ə)‿isˠ ˈtʲɾʲeː(h) ɡan̪ˠ ˈsˠpʲɾʲeːx ə.ˈnʲɪʃ]
[ʃɪnʲ ˈl̪ˠɪʃ.nʲə ˈjlʲeː sˠə ˈsˠpʲeːɾʲ ə.ˈnʲɪɾʲ]
[sˠ‿ənˠ ˈbʲiː.wə i ˈɾˠiːnˠ n̪ˠə bʲi.ˈlʲeːɾˠ a.ˈɡiː]
[ʃɔ lʲɪvʲ | ˈka.n̪ˠiː(ɟ) əu.ˈɾˠɑːn̪ˠ n̪ˠə ˈvʲi(ə)n̪ˠ]

[kuɾˠ.fˠɑː]

English original

We'll sing a song, a soldier's song
With cheering, rousing chorus
As round our blazing fires we throng
The starry heavens o'er us
Impatient for the coming fight
And as we wait the morning's light
Here in the silence of the night
We'll chant a soldier's song

Chorus

In valley green, or towering crag
Our fathers fought before us
And conquered 'neath the same old flag
That's proudly floating o'er us
We're children of a fighting race
That never yet has known disgrace
And as we march, the foe to face
We'll chant a soldier's song

Chorus

Sons of the Gael! Men of the Pale!
The long-watched day is breaking
The serried ranks of Innisfail
Shall set the tyrant quaking
Our camp fires now are burning low
See in the east a silv'ry glow
Out yonder waits the Saxon foe
So chant a soldier's song

Chorus

=== Extra verse ===
In the summer of 1937, probably motivated by the enactment of the Constitution of Ireland and its inclusion of Northern Ireland within the "national territory", Kearney wrote an extra verse "in answer to a request that the Irish of the Six North-Eastern Counties [i.e. Northern Ireland] could register a protest against the British-planned Partition of Ulster". It was published in The Irish Press in 1938. As of 1998, no recorded version included the extra verse, which runs: (Note: The version quoted in McGarry 2015 p.228 has slight differences of spelling; including "pirate brood" instead of "pirate blood".)

And here where Eire's glories bide,
Clann London fain would flourish;
But Ulster-wide, whate'er betide,
No pirate blood shall nourish;
While flames the faith of Con and Owen,
While Cave Hill guards the fame of Tone,
From Gullion's Slopes to Inishowen
We'll chant a Soldier's Song.
