= Royal Ulster Constabulary Band =

The Royal Ulster Constabulary Band was the public duties branch of the Royal Ulster Constabulary of Northern Ireland. It was formed in 1905 under District Inspector George C. Ferguson as the Band of the Royal Irish Constabulary. Shortly after the reformation of the RIC as the Royal Ulster Constabulary, the band remained on in that force. The original members were drawn from British military bands, with the band representing 28 independent British Army battalions by 1936. It performed regularly ay many official functions in Belfast as well as special occasions. It was the primary performer of the RUC marchpast, The Young May March. In 1977, a drum corps was created. The band also maintained a pipe and drums band. The pipes and drums were regarded as one of the best in the world. It was a grade 1 pipe band in the 1980s and 1990s. It was dissolved in 2001 with the establishment of the Police Service of Northern Ireland and the PSNI Pipes and Drums.

== See also ==
- Garda Band
- Irish Defence Forces School of Music
