= DFSM =

DFSM may refer to:

- Defence Force Service Medal
- Deterministic finite state machine
- Dry-film photoimageable solder mask, a type of solder mask on printed circuit boards
- Irish Defence Forces School of Music
