= Lamb's Gambol =

Lamb's Gambol may refer to:

- The frolicking dance of lambs, often referred to as a gambol
- Shows put on by the Lambs Club of New York City
  - The Lamb's Gambol, a 1914 performance with an overture by John Philip Sousa
- The Lamb's Gambol, a 1949 American Comedy television show with Jackie Gleason
