= Liam Ó Rinn =

Irish civil servant, writer and translator (1886–1943)

Liam Ó Rinn (20 November 1886 – 3 October 1943; born William J. Ring, also known by the pen name Coinneach) was a civil servant and Irish-language writer and translator, best known for "Amhrán na bhFiann", a translation of "The Soldier's Song", the Irish national anthem, which has largely eclipsed Peadar Kearney's English-language original.

== Life and career ==
Ó Rinn was born in Ballybough, Dublin, one of five sons and one daughter of Patrick Ring, a Dublin Metropolitan Police officer from Kilkenny, and his wife Elizabeth (née Griffith) from Laytown, County Meath. He attended St. Joseph's C.B.S. in Fairview, leaving aged 14 to work as a solicitor's clerk. He studied Irish with the Gaelic League, where he worked from c.1907 to 1920. He took part in the Easter Rising and was interned at Frongoch until December 1916. He was interned for a year in the Irish War of Independence. He wrote articles in Irish from 1914 and published books from 1920. He translated news stories in the Freeman's Journal in 1922–24, when he went to work in the Free State Oireachtas' translation department, producing Irish versions of official documents, including the 1922 constitution and the current 1937 constitution. He learned French, German, Spanish, Welsh, and Russian, and translated works from several Continental authors. He married Ellen Fennelly in 1920; they had several children.

Piaras Béaslaí said of Ó Rinn:

He did not write many original works, but the integrity of his critical opinion was unequalled; unswayed by consensus, applying his own reflection, examination, and judgment to every question relating to promoting Irish or to literature in Irish.

Art Ó Maolfhábhail noted his influence in writing about the modern urban world, including coining many new terms.

== Amhrán na bhFiann ==
Although Ruth Sherry says Ó Rinn's translation of "The Soldiers' Song" was first published in An tÓglach (the magazine of the Irish Defence Forces) on 3 November 1923, an almost identical text was printed in the Freeman's Journal on 3 April 1923, under Ó Rinn's pen name "Coinneach". Other translations had already been made into literary Classical Irish, whereas Ó Rinn favoured the living vernacular spoken in Gaeltacht areas. The Gaelic Athletic Association adopted Ó Rinn's version in the 1930s to be sung before all its matches, and it gradually eclipsed the English-language version in general use. Although the Irish version was never formally adopted by the state, both the English and Irish texts appear in Facts about Ireland, published by the Department of Foreign Affairs, and on the official website of the Department of the Taoiseach.

== Works ==
Translations into Irish

- The Books of the Polish People and of the Polish Pilgrimage by Adam Mickiewicz (Note: OCLC 839068834, OCLC 697952292, OCLC 20879687, OCLC 839068834)
- Prose poems by Ivan Turgenev (Note: OCLC 504705500)
- Rise of the Irish Volunteers by Maurice George Moore (Note: OCLC 5190029, OCLC 561710905)
- Stars in Their Courses by James Hopwood Jeans (Note: OCLC 820737573)
- Intensive Culture of Crops by Henri de Courcy (Note: OCLC 811956908, OCLC 810935204, OCLC 809340962)
- Hygiene by Richard Hayes (Note: OCLC 561710905)
- Our Country's Story by A. B. Ochiltree Ferguson (Note: OCLC 6261287)
- The Law-Suit by Roderich Benedix
- "The Soldier's Song" by Peadar Kearney

Original works

- "Cad ba dhóbair dó" agus sgeulta eile (Note: OCLC 6367002)
- Turus go Páras (Note: OCLC 5097074)
- Peann agus Pár (Note: OCLC 30246693, OCLC 561912573)
- Mo chara Stiofán (Note: OCLC 5072037)
- Ó Rinn, Liam (October 1942). "Scath fearthana...". Comhar. 1 (6): 10. doi:10.2307/20547592. JSTOR 20547592.
- Ó Rinn, Liam (January 1945). "Smaointe Nua ar Shean-Sgeal". Comhar. 4 (1): 1, 4. doi:10.2307/20547945. JSTOR 20547945.

Other

- Slighe na Saoirse (Irish Volunteers drill guide)
- So súd (anthology) (Note: OCLC 17517675, OCLC 820743827)

== Sources ==
- Breathnach, Diarmuid; Ní Mhurchú, Máire. "Ó Rinn, Liam (1886–1943)". ainm.ie (in Irish). Cló Iar-Chonnacht.
- Ó Maolfhábhail, Art (November 1953). "Liam Ó Rinn". Comhar. 12 (11): 25–26. doi:10.2307/20549626. JSTOR 20549626.
