= Friedrich Christian Sauerzweig =

German military bandleader (1881–1953)

- Born: 1 April 1881; Kleinmühlingen, Saxony-Anhalt, Germany
- Died: 7 April 1953 (aged 72); Dublin, Ireland
- Burial place: Mount Jerome Cemetery
- Occupations: Military bandmaster; conductor; composer
- Years active: 1910s–1947

Friedrich Christian Sauerzweig (1 April 1881 – 7 April 1953) was a German military bandmaster, conductor and composer who was, from 1940, the director of the Army School of Music in the Irish Free State.

== Career ==
Born in Kleinmühlingen, Saxony-Anhalt, Sauerzweig initially studied violin, oboe and clarinet at a local music school in Gommern. In April 1900, he enlisted as a bandsman with the "Infanterie Regiment 66" at Magdeburg. He became a pupil of the Royal Academy of Music in Berlin in 1910, where his teachers included Oskar Fleischer, and he frequently performed with the Berlin Philharmonic orchestra. He subsequently joined the Imperial German Army and served throughout World War I as a bandmaster with an artillery regiment.

Discharged in 1919, Sauerzweig was appointed director of the local orchestra at Greifswald. Invited to Ireland in 1923 to help establish the Army School of Music in the independent Irish Free State, together with Fritz Brase, he accepted a commission with the rank of captain. On the retirement of Brase, he became the School's director in 1940, was promoted to the rank of colonel in 1945, and held the appointment until his retirement in 1947.

He died in Dublin, aged 72, and was buried at Mount Jerome Cemetery.
