= Patrick Heeney =

Irish composer of the national anthem (1881–1911)

Patrick Heeney (19 October 1881 – 13 June 1911), sometimes spelt Heaney, was an Irish composer whose most famous work is the music to the Irish national anthem "Amhrán na bhFiann" (English: "The Soldier's Song").

== Background ==
Heeney was born at 101 Lower Mecklenburgh Street (now Railway Street) in Dublin. He was the son of a local grocer and attended St. Patrick's National School at 13 Mecklenburgh Street. He was a member of the Col. John O’Mahoney Hurling Club. A 1975 memoir of Peadar Kearney states Heeney initially worked for the postal service before taking employment as a bagman at Hickey's Drapers in North Earl Street. One individual of the correct age named "Patrick Heaney" is listed living in Dublin in the 1901 census as one of four unmarried siblings at 242 Township Cottages (now Gulistan Cottages), Rathmines. This seems very likely to be the composer since this man's job is listed as a "town postman". He is listed at the 31 Gulistan Cottages in the 1911 census (conducted in April, two months before the composer's death) along with a wife, Catherine, and a nine-month-old son, William.

== "The Soldier's Song" ==
Heeney was unable to write music, but had a knowledge of tonic sol-fa and usually composed by trying out melodies on his melodeon. "The Soldier's Song" is generally believed to have been composed in 1907, though, in later years, the lyricist Peadar Kearney put the date at 1909 or 1910. The English lyrics were the work of Kearney who was a prominent member of the Irish Republican Brotherhood and had been Heeney's musical collaborator since 1903. The unusual metre of Kearney's lyrics to "The Soldier's Song" initially gave Heeney considerable trouble in his attempt to fit music to them. Other collaborations between Heeney and Kearney include "Michael Dwyer".

== Death and commemoration ==
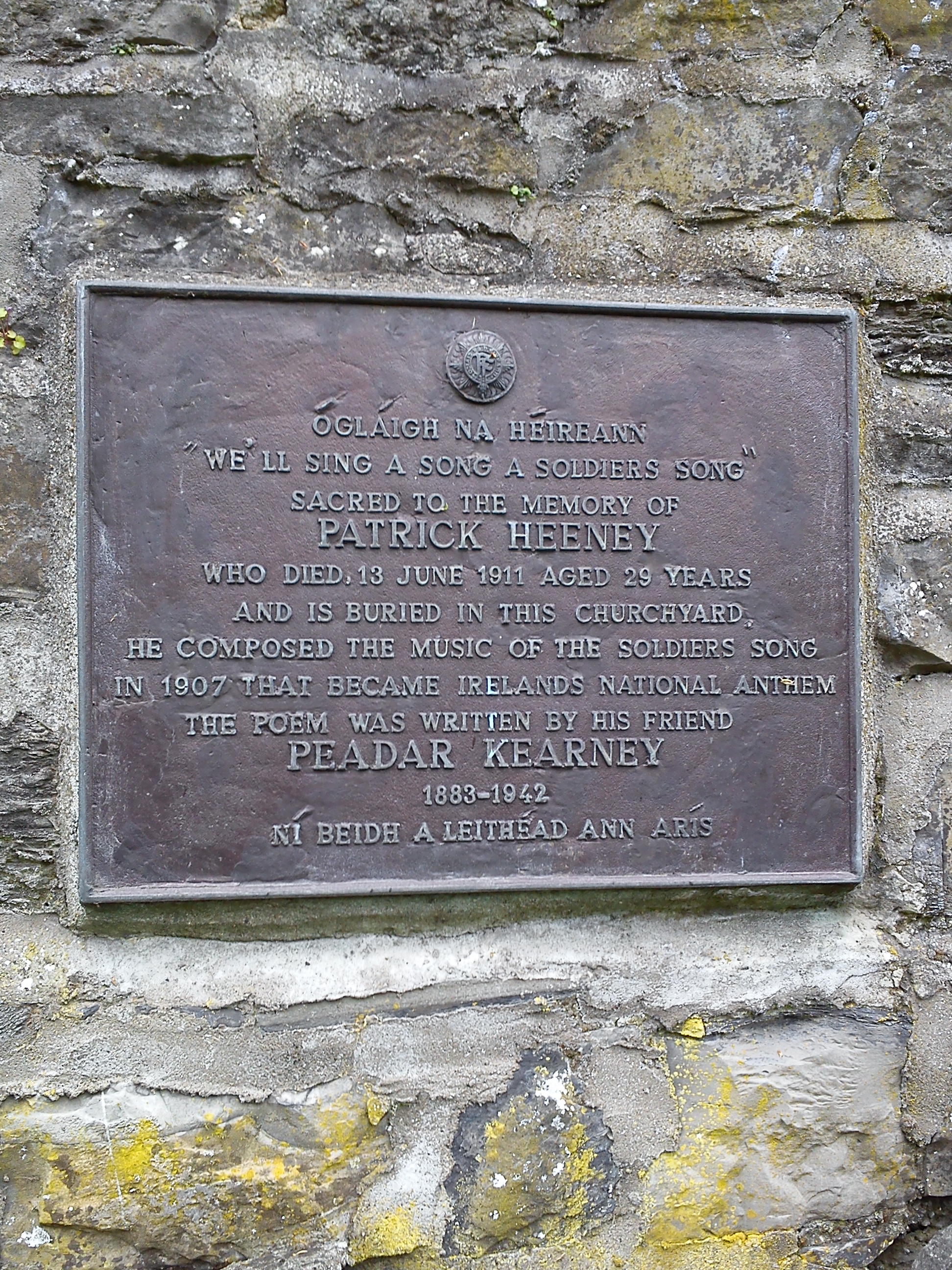
The plaque in Drumcondra Cemetery commemorating Heeney

Heeney died in poverty aged 29 in Jervis Street Hospital, Dublin. He was buried in an unmarked grave in Drumcondra Cemetery, where a plaque on the wall now commemorates him. Peadar Kearney was in London with the Abbey Company at the time of Heeney's death. He took up a collection for his deceased friend's mother. Among the contributors were Michael Collins and Sam Maguire. Peadar Kearney dedicated his song Slán Libh to Paddy Heeney. In 2010, Dublin City Council named Patrick Heeney House (apartments) and Patrick Heeney Crescent, a new 63 unit housing development in Summerhill, in the composer's honour.
