= Fritz Brase =

German military bandmaster, conductor, and composer

- Signed portrait of Brase in Irish Army uniform
- Born: Friedrich Wilhelm Anton Brase; 4 May 1875; Egestorf, Germany
- Died: 1 December 1940 (age 65); Dublin, Ireland
- Resting place: Mount Jerome Cemetery
- Occupation: Army band leader
- Years active: 1893–1940
- Spouse: Elisabeth Henriette Antonie Brase
- Children: Mona

Friedrich Wilhelm Anton Brase, known as Fritz Brase ([fʁɪt͡s ˈbʁaːzə]; 4 May 1875 – 1 December 1940), was a German military bandmaster, conductor, and composer who was mainly active in Dublin, Ireland, as leader of the first Army School of Music in the Irish Free State.

== Life ==
Brase was the son of a miller born in Egestorf near Hanover, Germany. Brase studied at the Conservatory of Music at Leipzig where his teachers included Carl Reinecke, Hans Sitt, and Salomon Jadassohn. In 1923 he emigrated to Ireland, and a few years later, in 1924, he and his wife Elsa, who was aged 35 when they came to Ireland, had a daughter, Mona, who was born while they lived at the Curragh Camp. The family moved to accommodation in Beggars Bush Barracks and later bought their own house in the Dublin suburb of Sandymount. His wife, Elsa, whose full name was Elisabeth Henriette Antonie, arrived in Ireland on 1 March 1923 and was granted her Irish naturalisation between 1 January 1946 and 20 October 1947.

In 1940, Brase died the day after he retired and was interred in Mount Jerome Cemetery, Dublin, when the No. 1 Irish Army Band played. His daughter Mona, who died on 2 November 2014, is also buried in Mount Jerome Cemetery.

A street in Münster is named Braseweg in his memory.

== Musical career ==
In 1893, he enlisted in the military band at Bückeburg where his abilities as conductor and arranger qualified him for further studies at the Hochschule für Musik, Berlin, studying with Joseph Joachim and Max Bruch.

In 1906, he was appointed conductor of the Infantry Regiment 13's band at Münster and received early encouragement, when in 1909, at the age of 34, he was promoted Prussian "Königlicher Musikdirektor" (Royal Music Director). In 1911, he was appointed conductor of the 1st (Emperor Alexander) Guards Grenadiers, "one of the most prestigious positions in the world of German military music". Following the German defeat in World War I, Brase was discharged from service in April 1919 and spent the following four years in various consignments including conducting a police band in Berlin.

Brase emigrated to Ireland in 1923, at the invitation of by General Richard Mulcahy, who wanted him to take charge of the Irish military musical training and music branch. He arrived on 1 March 1923 with a friend, Friedrich Christian Sauerzweig, who had also been a member of the Berlin Philharmonic, and was commissioned captain. Brase was attracted by the option of a rank of full colonel in the Irish Army and to take up the position of the first leader of the Army School of Music in the newly established Irish Free State and inspector of the Irish Military Music Corps where, later that year, he formed the Army No.1 Band. He also directed the Military Music School in Dublin. Having failed to find a potential Frenchman and wanting to avoid a British appointee for the army's school of music, their search for an "expert military musician" chose the German for the post.

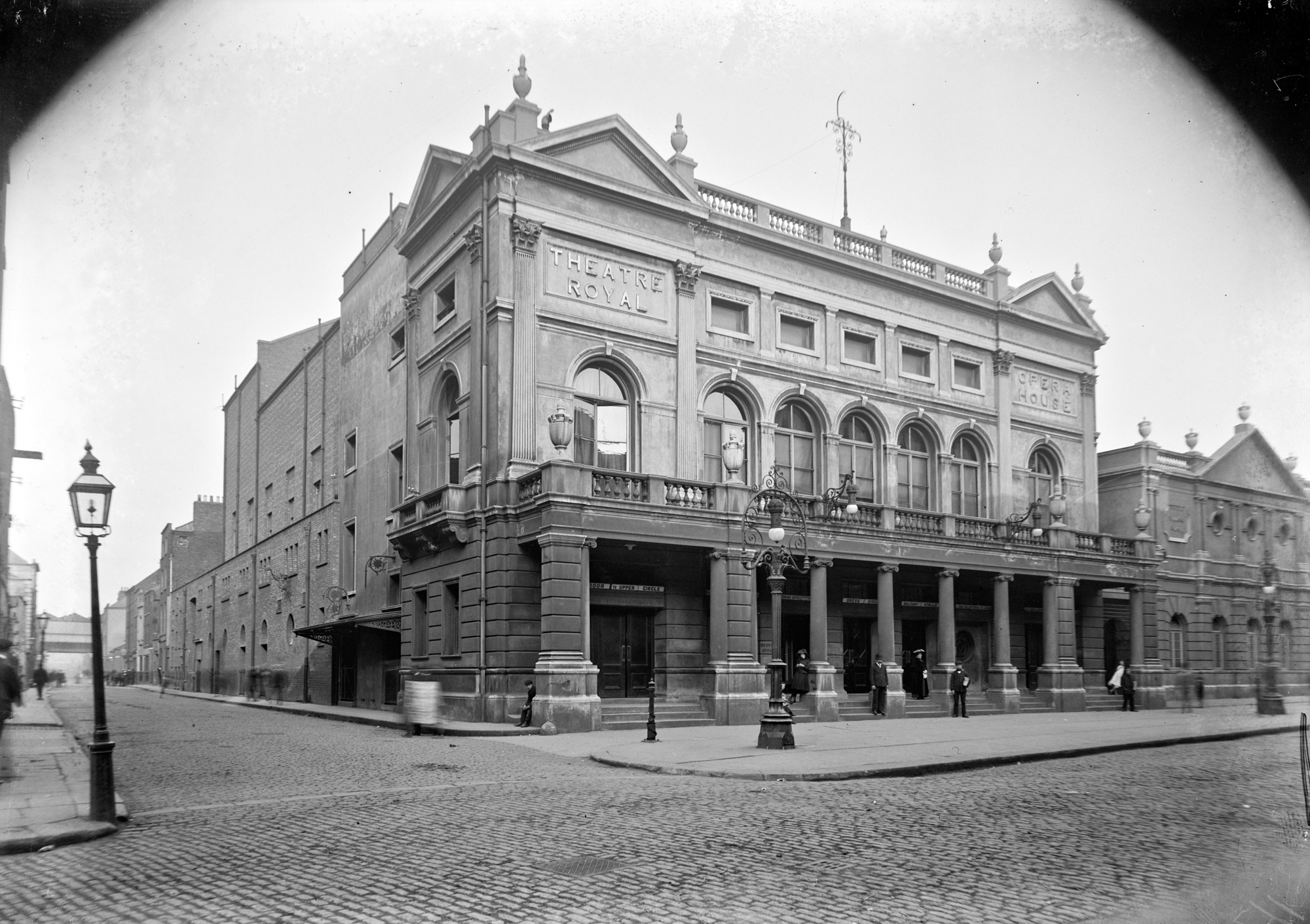
Dublin's Theatre Royal, venue of the Irish Army Band's first public concert

Within just seven months of arriving in Ireland, Brase had been so productive that the first public performance of Brase's new army band took place in Dublin's Theatre Royal that October and by the following December had recorded its first two records with two more being issued in January 1925.

Until 1928, he created four military bands in cooperation with a compatriot who had emigrated with him, Captain Friedrich Christian Sauerzweig, with Brase focusing on the "Army No. 1 Band". For independent Ireland, bringing over musicians from Germany was one way of breaking free from British influence. With his band, Brase toured Ireland extensively between the mid-1920s and early 1930s, playing at many festive occasions, both indoors and in public spaces. He also initialised a regular series of band concerts for primary schools in Dublin which, over the years, were attended by thousands of Irish school children. In 1927, he also co-founded the Dublin Philharmonic Society, a successful orchestra and chorus with a brass section recruited from the army band, which he directed until 1936 when he had to resign for health reasons. At the Army School of Music, he educated a number of prominent Irish musicians including Michael Bowles, Arthur Duff, and Dermot O'Hara.

Recognition of Brase's contribution and achievements: Anthony Charles Esmonde in Dáil Éireann in November 1952

When musical broadcasts were first organised in this country, under the late Colonel Fritz Brase, a German, he did not import a whole lot of foreign musicians. He recognised the fact that there was a fund of musical talent latent in the Irish people and he set out to develop that talent... but I think it is a pity that his policy was not continued, that this talent was not sought out and developed on a more extensive scale. That appears to me to be the difficulty with the orchestras in this country— that the talent that is there has not been sought out by the officials, the directors or whoever is in control of Radio Éireann and utilised so as to give employment to the fullest extent to Irish musicians and artistes.

Brase's influence on the cultural life of the nascent Irish republic was considerable and he was an ambitious composer who also wrote many works outside the military band repertory. He wrote a Symphony in D major that was performed in Münster in 1908 and a number of other orchestral scores. For the army bands, he wrote many original scores (including the General Mulcahy March and six Irish Fantasias) and arranged numerous Irish traditional tunes for military band. His first Irish Fantasia was played in 1926 at the opening broadcast of 2RN, the predecessor of today's Radio Telefís Éireann. He also wrote the station's official arrangement of the Irish national anthem.

== German colony in Ireland ==
Brase was one of a small number of Germans and Austrians living in Ireland in the 1930s, several of whom had been brought there by the Irish Government, that included Brase and others, mostly involved in new industry the fledgling state was trying to develop. Otto Bene, leader of the Nazi Party in Britain and Ireland, living in London, visited Dublin to celebrate Hitler's birthday on 20 April 1933 in the presence of Brase and several others of the German colony that took place in the German Legation. Bene was responsible for recruiting Germans to the Nazi Party. Brase joined the Nazi Party on 1 April 1932 according to records in Berlin.

Encouraged by Bene, the German community in Ireland set up a branch of the overseas Nazi Party – the Auslandsorganisation (NSDAP-AO), in 1934. Brase was elected chairman, however, when he requested permission from the Irish Army to lead the group, it was clearly suggested he choose between the two. He chose the army and his career allowing Adolf Mahr, another German immigree and director of the National Museum of Ireland, to assume the position. Bene again came to Dublin in 1935 to attend Brase's 60th birthday party in the family home in Sandymount.

The soccer match between Germany and Ireland, that Ireland won 5 to 2, at Dalymount Park on 7 March 1936 was attended by Brase leading the Army Band playing the Nazi national anthem, "Deutschlandlied", to which the attending Germans stood to attention with their right arms raised in a Nazi salute while singing.

Brase was an active participant in the elaborate events, such as Christmas parties, held by the small German colony that took place in Dublin's grand hotels, the Royal Hibernian Hotel and Gresham Hotels. At the 1937 event, Brase played piano to accompany the children's performance for the adults, as reported in both the Irish Independent and Irish Times. The latter report was likely written by its editor Robert Smylie, a German speaker, also an attendee.

Christian Sauerzweig, mentioned some of Brase's activities to his superior, who in turn informed the head of Office of the Directorate of Intelligence, than named "G2", that at least twice in early September 1939 Brase burned papers in the boiler house of the school of music, and that, in April 1940, on the occasion of the funeral of the German diplomat, Robert Wenzel, that he and Brase wore their military uniforms and Brase gave the Nazi salute at the graveside. Besides these reports, a military intelligence file was kept on Brase also notes that he sent Adolf Hitler birthday greetings in 1939 by telegraph to the Reich Chancellery.

== Selected compositions ==
Brass band

- Hoch die 7ten Jäger (1897)
- Bienenhaus Marsch (c. 1900)
- Jugenderinnerungen Marsch (1901)
- Heil Danzig (1910)
- Exzellenz von Bernhardi (1910)
- Grosse Zeit, neue Zeit (1910)
- General Mulcahy March (1923; Dublin: McCullough, 1924)
- Irish March No. 2 (1923; Dublin: McCullough, c. 1924)
- Irish March No. 3 (1923)
- Irish Fantasia No. 1 (1923; Dublin: McCullough [n. d.])
- National March (1924)
- Irish Fantasia No. 2 (1924)
- Irish Fantasia No. 3 (1924)
- Irish Fantasia No. 4 (1925)
- Funeral March (1926)
- Irish Fantasia No. 5 (1927)
- Irish Fantasia No. 6 (1930)
- Der Gott, der Eisen wachsen liess (1933)
- Flieger-Escapaden (1935)

Orchestra

- Heimatlos (1902)
- Dramatische Ouvertüre (1902)
- Symphony in D major (1905)
- Westfalen (1912)
- Menuett, for salon orchestra (1921, arrangement of piano work)
- Paraná, for salon orchestra (1926)
- Irlandia, suite (1932)
- Episoden-Suite (1937)
- Irish Dance No. 1: The Londonderry Clog (published 1938)
- Irish Dance No. 2: The Frost is All Over (published 1938)
- Irische Lustspiel-Ouvertüre (1939; Berlin: Musikverlag Sanssouci, 1959; reprint 1982)
- Donegal. Rhapsody for orchestra No. 2 (1939; reprint Berlin: Musikverlag Sanssouci, 1995)

Piano

- Strebe vorwärts, Op. 1
- Mazurka brilliante, Op. 2 (1894)
- Mazurka brilliante, Op. 4 (1895)
- Waltz, Op. 7 (1896)
- Capriccio, Op. 12 No. l (1898)
- Die Garde an der Somme (c.1915–16)
- Joska (1920)
- Menuett (1921)
- Pierette (1921)
- Waldmärchen (1921)
- Orchideen (1922)
- Herbst (1923)
- Little Moira, serenade (1925)
- Horse Show March (1926)
- Bi-centenary March 1731–1931 (London: Boosey and Hawkes, 1931), online
- Helden im Volksmund. Eine deutsche Rhapsodie (1933)

Other

- Several songs for voice and piano
- Some chamber music, such as Nymphentanz, Op. 9 (for violin and piano, 1898)

== Selected recordings ==
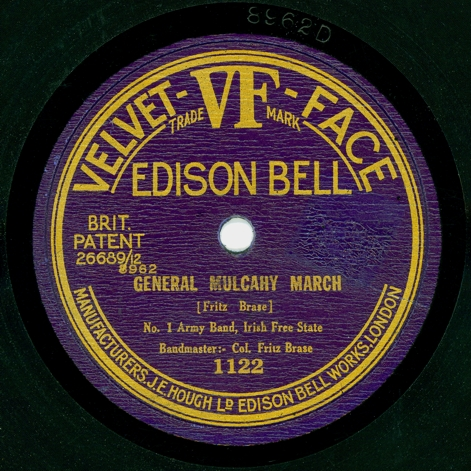
General Mulcahy March record label

- Maientraum Kapelle des Kaiser Alexander Garde Grenadier-Regt. No. 1, Berlin, written and conducted by Brase.
- Fruhlingszauber Kapelle des Kaiser Alexander Garde Grenadier-Regt. No. 1, Berlin, conductor Brase
- Große Zeit, Neue Zeit 1912
- Der Gott, der Eisen wachsen ließ
- Himmelstürmer Luftwaffe march
- General Mulcahy March
- Irish Fantasia No.1 1924
- Serenade and Minuet No. 1 Army Band, Irish Free State, 1925
- Irish National March Pathé News video
- Numerous orchestral arrangements of Irish folk music

== Bibliography ==
- John Brennock, "The Army School of Music: The First Twenty Years", in An Cosantóir vol. 13 no. 10 (October 1973), pp. 335–341.
- Joseph J. Ryan, The Army School of Music, 1922–1940: Its Formulation and Evolution with a Critical Assessment of its First Director, Wilhelm Fritz Brase (M.A. thesis, Maynooth University, 1987), volume 1, volume 2.
- Gareth Cox and Joseph J. Ryan, "Fritz Brase's Contribution to Irish Musical Life, 1923–1940", in Joachim Fischer and Gisela Holfter (eds), Creative Influences: Selected Irish-German Biographies (Trier: Wissenschaftlicher Verlag, 2009), ISBN 978-3-86821-158-0, pp. 53–62.

== Discography ==
- Irish Fantasia No. 1, performed by The Band of the Irish Guards, Andrew Chatburn (conductor), on: Specialist Recording Company SRC 121 (CD, 2003).
- O'Donnell Abú; Irish Dance No. 2: The Frost is All Over; Irish Army March (General Mulcahy March); John F. Larchet: Lament for Youth (arranged by Fritz Brase), performed by The Band of the Irish Defence Forces, Mark Armstrong (conductor), on: RTÉ lyric fm CD 157 (CD, 2018).
