= Garda Band =

PR branch of the Irish police force

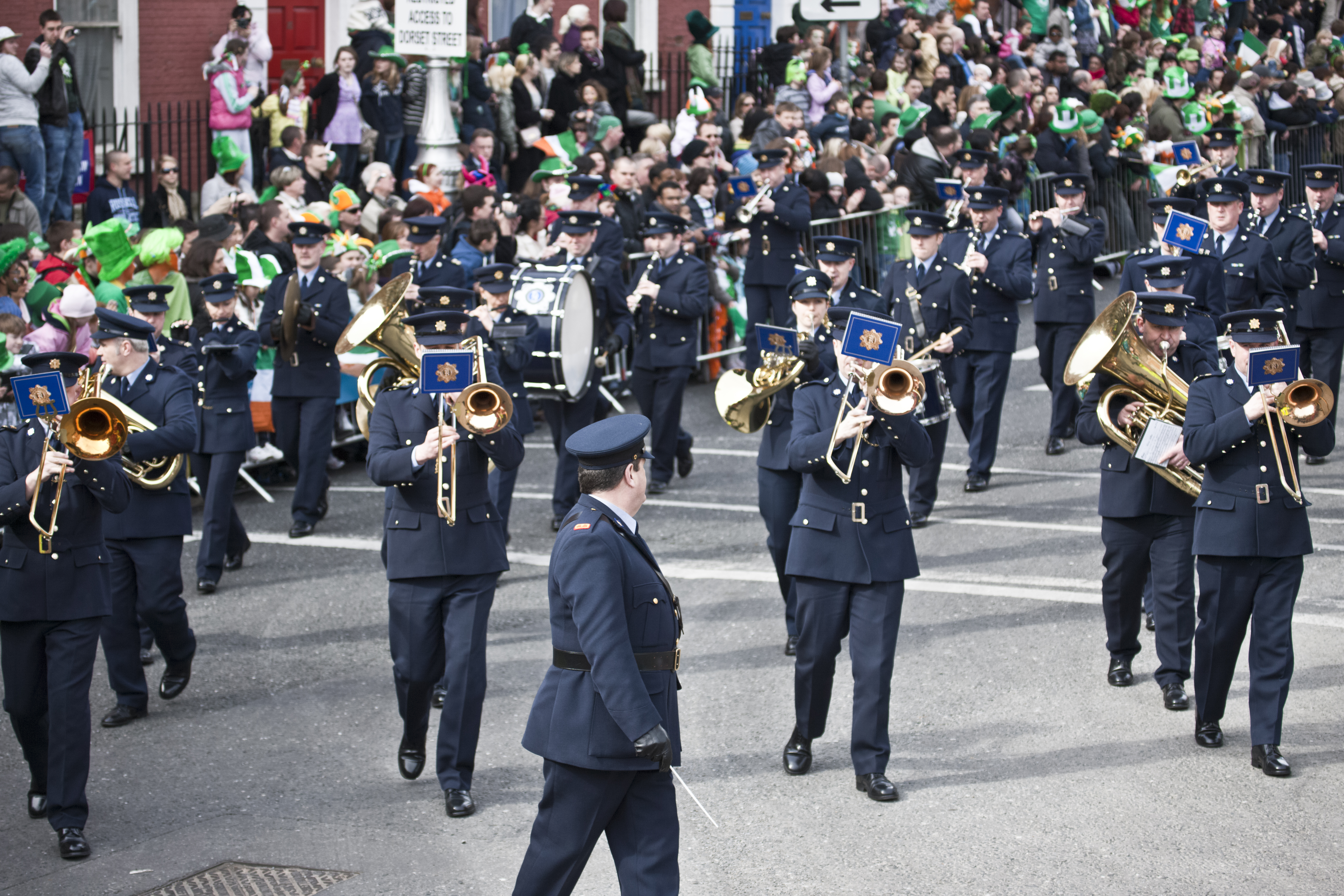
Garda band at the Dublin St. Patrick's day parade, 2013

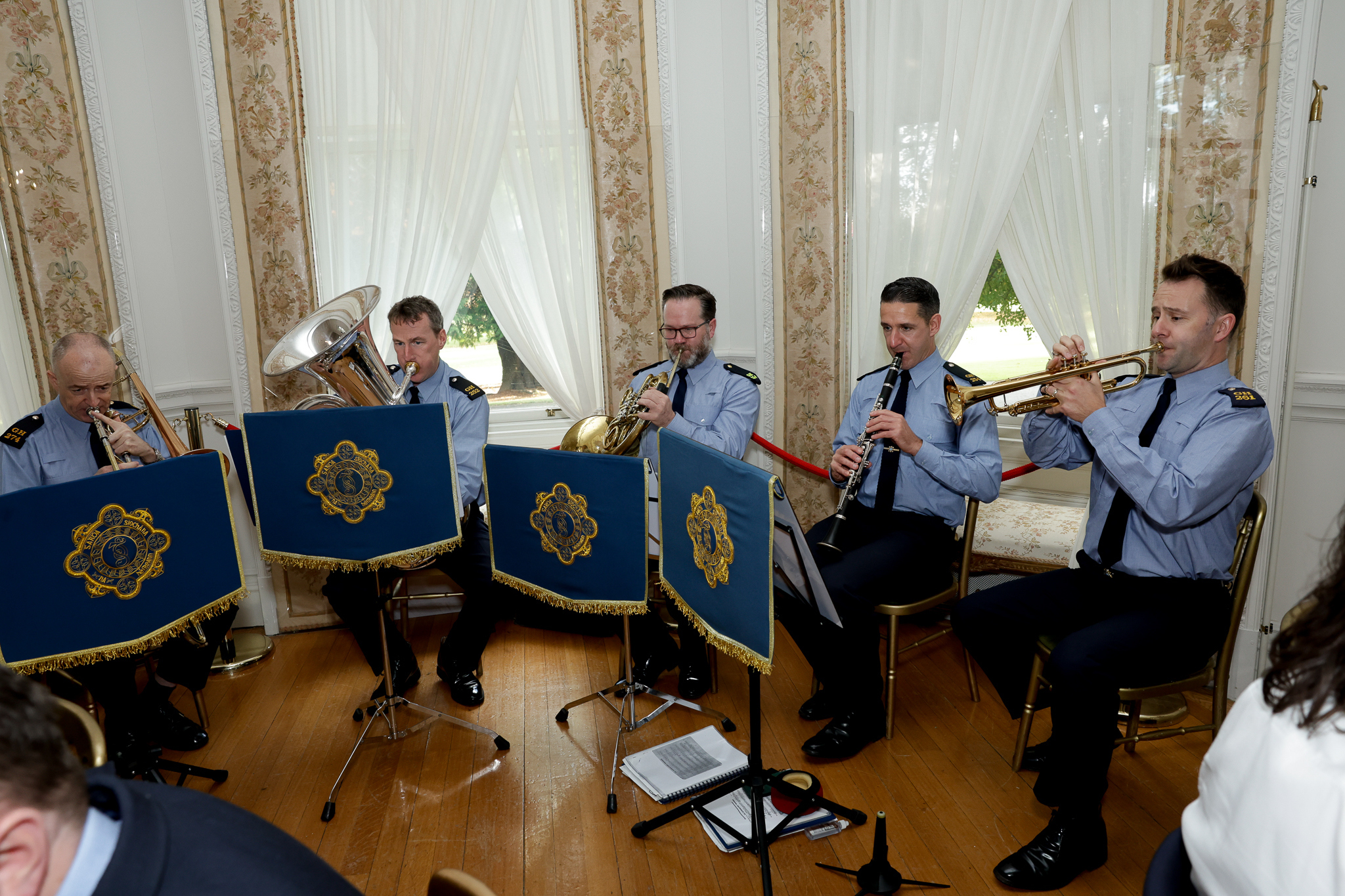
Garda band at the national bravery awards, 2023

The Garda Band is the public relations branch of the Garda Síochána, which is the police service of Ireland. It is composed of 29 full time members and was founded in 1922.

== History ==
Its first public appearance was at Dún Laoghaire Pier on Easter Monday in 1923, and its first Bandmaster was Superintendent D.J. Delaney. In 1938, the Dublin Metropolitan Garda Band (based at Kevin Street) and the regular Garda Military Band were merged and were relocated to Phoenix Park. In 1964, the band was engaged in a North American tour of the United States and Canada under the direction of Superintendent J. Moloney. It was disbanded in November 1965 by order of Justice Minister Brian Lenihan Snr but was then reformed seven years later to commemorate the golden jubilee of the foundation of the Garda Siochana. The move to disband the band was questioned during a general debate in the Dáil Éireann by the Labour Party deputy opposition leader James Tully. The decision to reestablish the band was also in part due to the report of the Conroy Commission of 1970. At its reestablishment, Sergeant T. J. Boyle on 1 September 1972, serving until his retirement in October 1988. In 1978, women were recruited to the Garda Band for the first time. All members recruited after 26 April 1990 have not had the option to transfer to other duties.

In 2014, acting Garda commissioner Noirín O’Sullivan proposed at the opening ceremony of Dublin Pride that the band could take part in the pride parade for the first time. In May 2019, a band member was involved in an incident which saw the member punching a fellow bandmember backstage at a BBC Northern Ireland event, where the Police Service of Northern Ireland Pipes and Drums were performing with the Garda Band on television for the first time.

== Official functions ==
It primarily provides music for official functions such as graduation ceremonies at the Garda College and parades with the Garda. It has also performed at venues such as schools, festivals and sporting events. These have included performances at international soccer, rugby union and Gaelic Athletic Association matches, the St. Patrick's Day parade in Dublin, and the Rose of Tralee. It has historically participated in events such as the 4th International Police Band Festival in Switzerland (1991), and the Easter Rising centenary parade. Between 2000 and 2005, it participated in close to 900 public events.

== Salary and finances ==
Members of the band have an average salary of average of €58,985. Clothing and accessories also cost taxpayer €78,677 while €70,426 is spent on technical equipment. In 2017, it was revealed that the Garda Band accounted for €5,478,764 of police spending. The revelation came just after the lack of resources within the Garda was scrutinized by the Oireachtas Justice Committee. Even after cutting travel expenses by 50%, band cost almost €1.75m a year later.

== See also ==
- Royal Ulster Constabulary Band
- Irish Defence Forces School of Music
