= Jimmy McGee =

Irish basketball player

Jim McGee
Personal information
- Nationality: Irish
- Born: 3 June 1923; Boyle, Ireland
- Died: 4 November 1998 (aged 75); Dublin, Ireland

Sport
- Sport: Basketball

James Richard McGee (3 June 1923 – 4 November 1998) was an Irish basketball player and musician. He competed in the men's tournament at the 1948 Summer Olympics.

== Biography ==
McGee was born in Boyle, Roscommon. He joined the Irish Army in 1938 at the age of 15. Three years later, he enlisted in the School of Music in Dublin where he was a member of the Army No. 1 Band at Cathal Brugha Barracks in Rathmines. During this period, he was a member of the Eastern Command basketball team and was selected in 1948 to be a member of the Irish Olympic basketball team that was sent to London.

After leaving the team, he moved in 1951 to Athlone to direct the Western Command Band, where he would go on to serve 30 years with. McGee also served on a United Nations peacekeeping deployment for six months in Cyprus during this time. He was appointed to the post of director of the Defence Force School of Music in 1987, retiring a year later at the rank of colonel and as one of the longest serving servicemen in the Defence Forces, having served for 50 years.
