= Irish Defence Forces School of Music =

- Scoil Cheoil Óglaigh na hÉireann
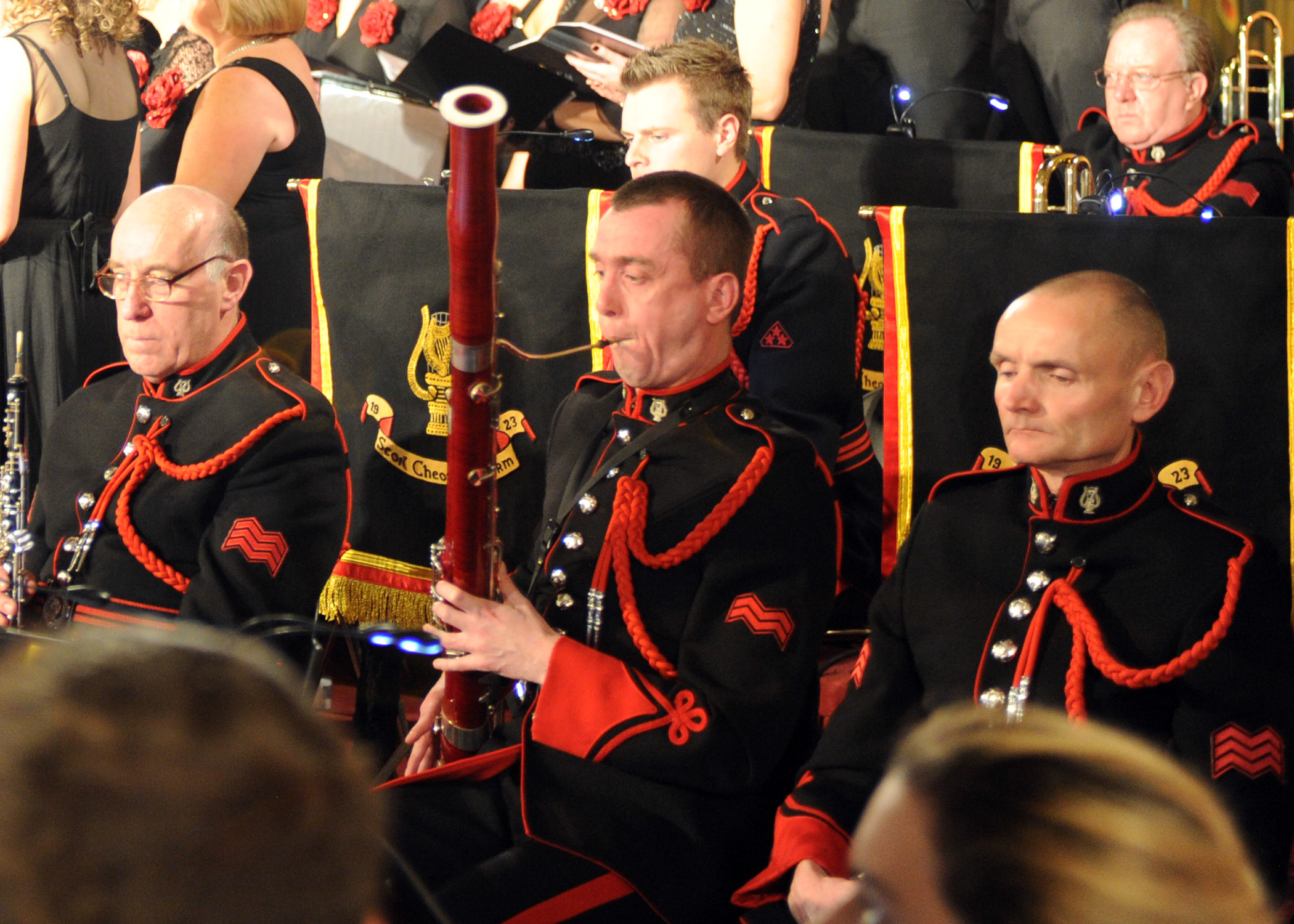
- Active: November 1922; 103 years ago
- Country: Ireland
- Branch: Defence Forces (Ireland)
- Type: Military Band corps
- Headquarters: Cathal Brugha Barracks, Dublin
- Nickname: DFSM

Commanders
- Director of Music: Lieutenant Colonel Margaret Bannister (since 2023)
- Notable commanders: Colonel Fritz Brase (1923–1940)

The Irish Defence Forces School of Music (Scoil Cheoil Óglaigh na hÉireann) is established as a Corps of the Irish Defence Forces and has responsibility for the maintenance and training of the three military bands of the Defence Forces. It contains a directorate and a headquarters and three detached military bands. The 97 members of the three bands currently perform at approximately 500 state, military and civilian events annually.

== History ==
The idea for an Army School of Music was first mooted in November 1922, when General Richard Mulcahy, the then Chief of Staff, said that he wanted to have bands "that will dispense music and musical understanding in the highest terms to the people". The first requirement was for expert military musicians to take on the task of training bands. At the time, military bands closely followed the precedent of the British Corps of Army Music, with the civilian Brass and Reed Band of the Irish Transport and General Workers' Union playing a role in a native Army School of Music. The government originally reached out to the French Republican Guard Band, which was unsuccessful, however they were able to receive training from Germany. One musician in particular, Colonel Wilhelm Fritz Brase, who was the "Royal Music Director" of the Emperor Alexander 1st Guards Grenadiers since 1907, was invited to lead the band on March 1, 1923. By January 1924, the entire operation was transferred from the Curragh to Beggars Bush Barracks in Dublin. Between 1924 and 1936, a school and three more military bands, all under the title of "The Army School of Music".

Colonel Brase died in 1940 and was succeeded by Colonel Sauerzweig, who emigrated to Ireland with Brase, served as director until 1947. 1997 saw a reorganisation of the Defence Forces which also included a reduction in overall strength. The bands of the re-titled Defence Forces School of Music did not remain untouched by this process.

== List of directors ==
- Colonel Wilhelm Fritz Brase (1923–1940)
- Colonel Christian Sauerzweig (1940–1947)
- Colonel James Doyle (1947–1971)
- Colonel John Brennock (1971–1981)
- Colonel Fred O’Callaghan (1981–1987)
- Colonel Jim McGee (1987–1988)
- Colonel Neil O’Brien (1988–1997)
- Lieutenant Colonel Brendan Power (1997–2010)
- Lieutenant Colonel Mark Armstrong (2010–2023)
- Lieutenant Colonel Margaret Bannister (since 2023)

Colonel McGee was the longest serving member of the Defence Forces having served from 1938 up until his retirement in 1988.

== Mission and contemporary activities ==
"We have to be adaptable. We must be able to stand in the rain and play at a state funeral in the morning and then go into the National Concert Hall in the evening and sit down in concert dress and play to international standards."

— Lieutenant Colonel Mark Armstrong, Eolas Magazine

The Defence Forces School of Music (DFSM) has the responsibility for the overall direction of music policy within the Defence Forces. In addition to overseeing all purchases of new instruments, music and band equipment, the DFSM has responsibility of recruiting and training new instrumentalists. Military instrumentalists of the DFSM provide musical support for all aspects of military life. Potential instrumentalists are required to complete an online application form when they are between 18–28 years old.

During the Easter Rising centenary parade, the DFSM was represented along with 4 other civilian bands at the from St. Stephen's Green to O'Connell Bridge. Colonel James McGee was responsible for the current arrangement of Amhrán na bhFiann on state occasions. The DFSM composed the anthem based on British military marches and songs of the era. Uilleann piper Colm Ó Lochlainn described this version with the following: "The tune is not Irish; it sounds to me something between a Sousa march and a German regimental song".

== Uniform ==
Irish Army Bands wear a black ceremonial uniform with red stripes on the trousers and peak cap type headwear. The DFSM's traditional uniform was Bottle-green, which is one of the standard colours of the Irish Army. Lieutenant Colonel Brendan Power of the DFSM criticized the band's uniform, "It was worst when we'd travel abroad" and that they "didn't look the business." In February 2003, it changed gained its modern uniform in the fourth change of dress since its foundation. Outside of the current one and the bottle green uniform, other uniforms included one with St. Patrick's blue, and a navy blue in the early 1960s. They are made in Antwerp, Belgium, and cost in total €225,000.

== Military bands ==
=== Army No. 1 Band ===
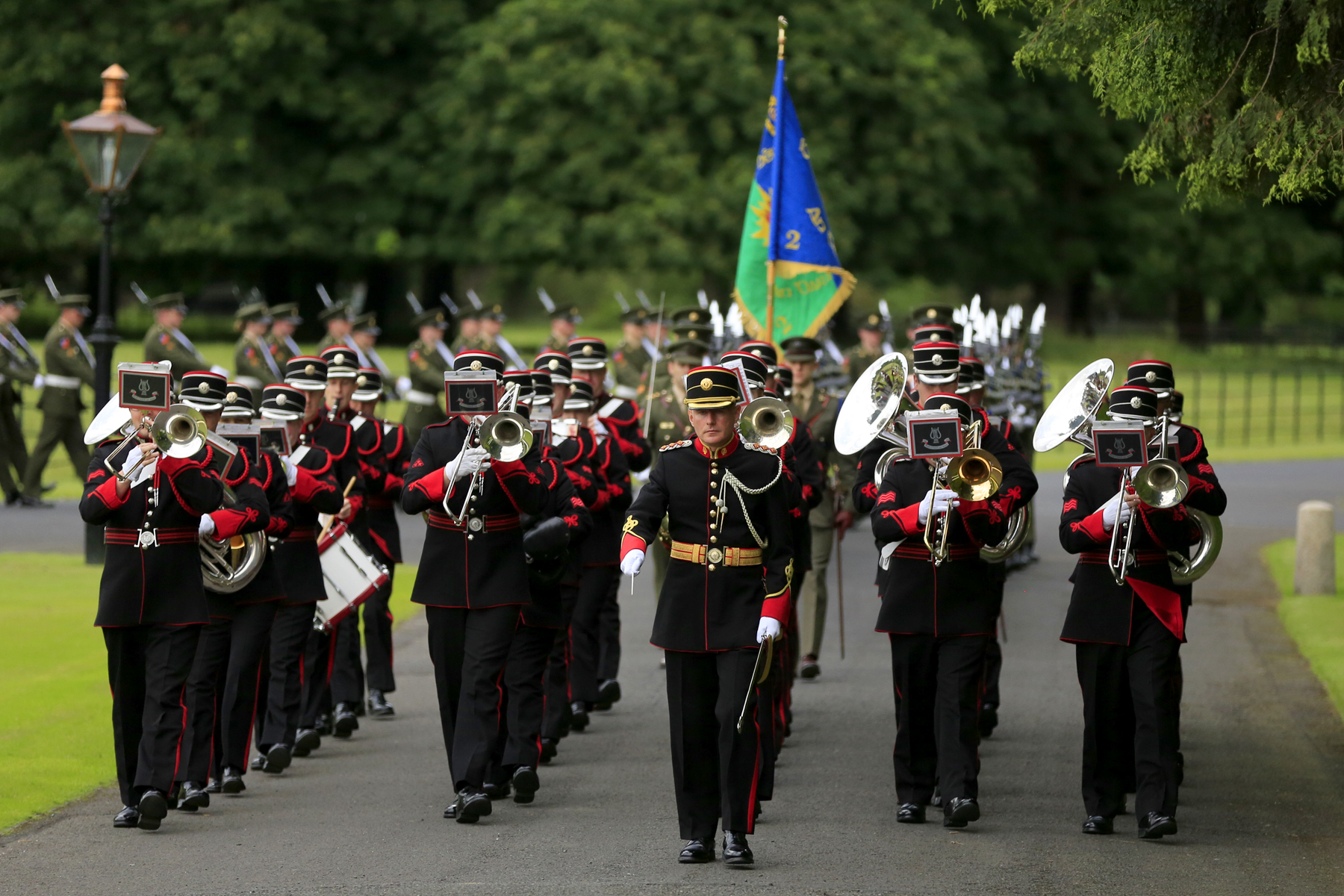
The Army No. 1 Band during the State Visit by the President of Mozambique.

The Army No. 1 Band (Irish: Banna Arm Uimh.1) was formed in 1923 by Colonel Wilhelm Fritz Brase (The former Royal Music Director of the Emperor Alexander 1st Guards Grenadiers) and gave its first public performance under the direction of Colonel Brase at the Theatre Royal in Dublin, on October 14 of that year. The band, which was the first of four military bands to be established between 1923 and 1936, is the premier military band of the Irish Defence Forces. It performs on all major ceremonial occasions, including the presidential inauguration. It also provides musical support during state visits to Ireland by foreign heads of state. The band has performed at festival and military tattoos in Italy, the Netherlands, Germany and France. It is based out of Cathal Brugha Barracks in Dublin and is currently led by Captain Thomas Kelly.

=== Band 1 Brigade ===
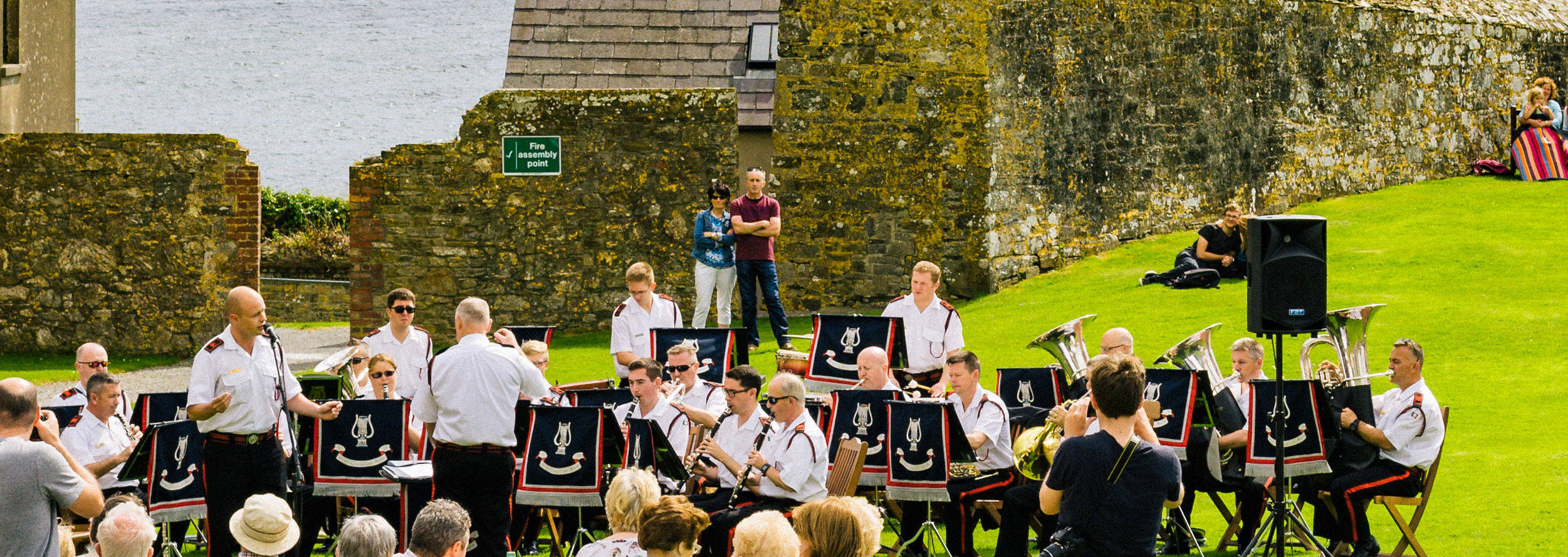
The band at Charles Fort

Band 1 Brigade (Irish: Banna den 1ú Briogáid), formerly known as the Army No. 2 Band, was formed in April 1925 at Beggars Bush Barracks, Dublin. Its current title dates from a reorganisation of the Defence Forces in 1997. It is located in Collins Barracks, Cork and is currently led by Captain Ben Jacob.

=== Band 2 Brigade ===
Band 2 Brigade (Irish: Banna den 2ú Briogáid), formerly known as the Army No. 4 Band, is another territorial band of the DFSM based in Athlone. It was formed in 1936 and has been located at Custume Barracks in Athlone ever since. The band was previously known as the Band of the Western Command. The band services an area ranging from Westmeath to Donegal. It has had the distinction, unlike other military bands, to have served a six-month tour as part of a United Nations mission in Cyprus in 1965. During its tour, it performed for both the Greek and Turkish communities on the island. It was also the first Irish military band to perform in the United Kingdom when it visited Birmingham, England. It has also been abroad to perform in festivals and parades in countries such as France, Lebanon and Belgium. The band is currently led by Captain William Chester

== Defence Forces pipe bands ==
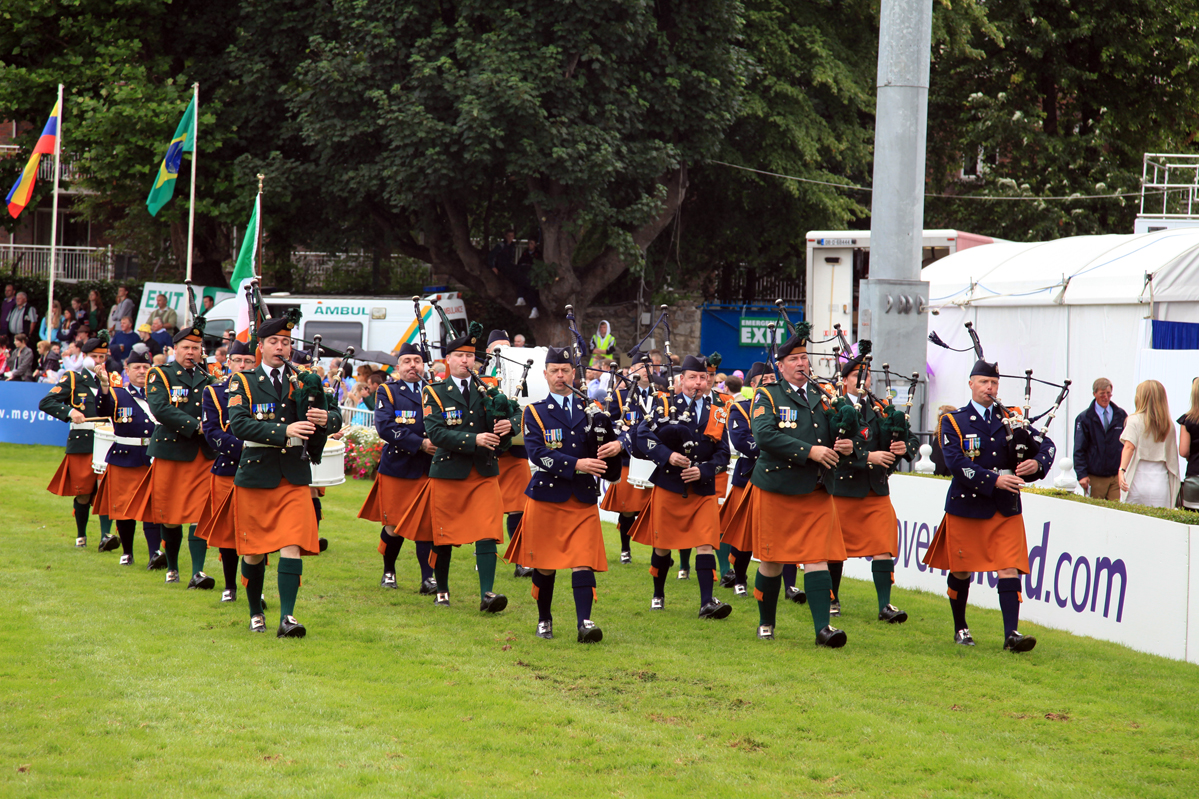
Pipe bands marching during the Dublin Horse Show and Nations Cup in August 2010.

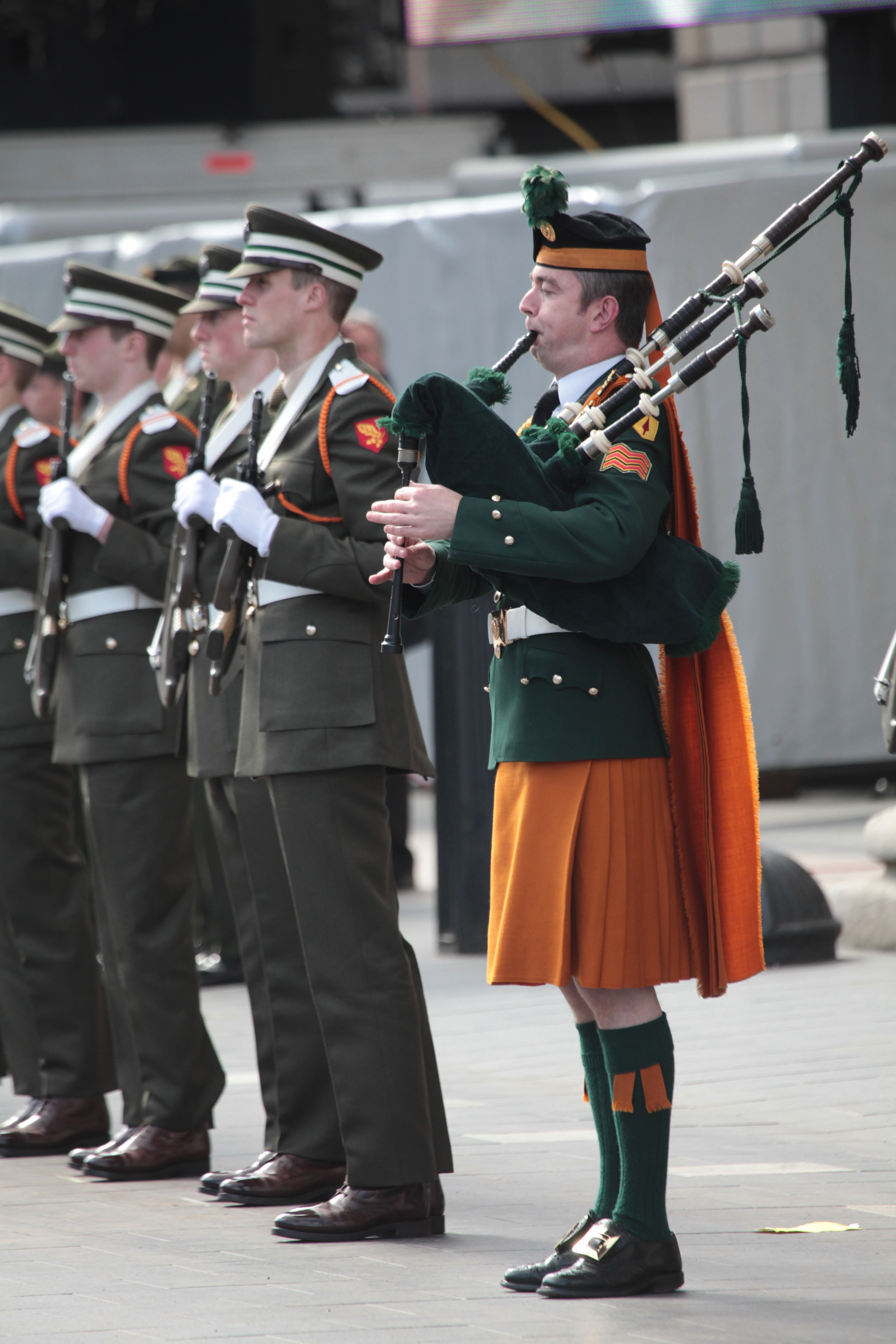
Sergeant Kevin Duncan of the DFSM performs Lament outside the General Post Office.

Personnel of pipe bands serve in their musical role in addition to their primary military duties as riflemen. Irish pipe bands served in the Congo, Cyprus, and Lebanon and play an important role in maintaining morale. Currently each of the nine Permanent Defence Force infantry battalions has a pipe band trained by the School of Music.

The following is a list of DFSM Pipe Bands:

- 28th Infantry Battalion Pipe Band
- Irish Air Corps Pipe Band

== Photos ==
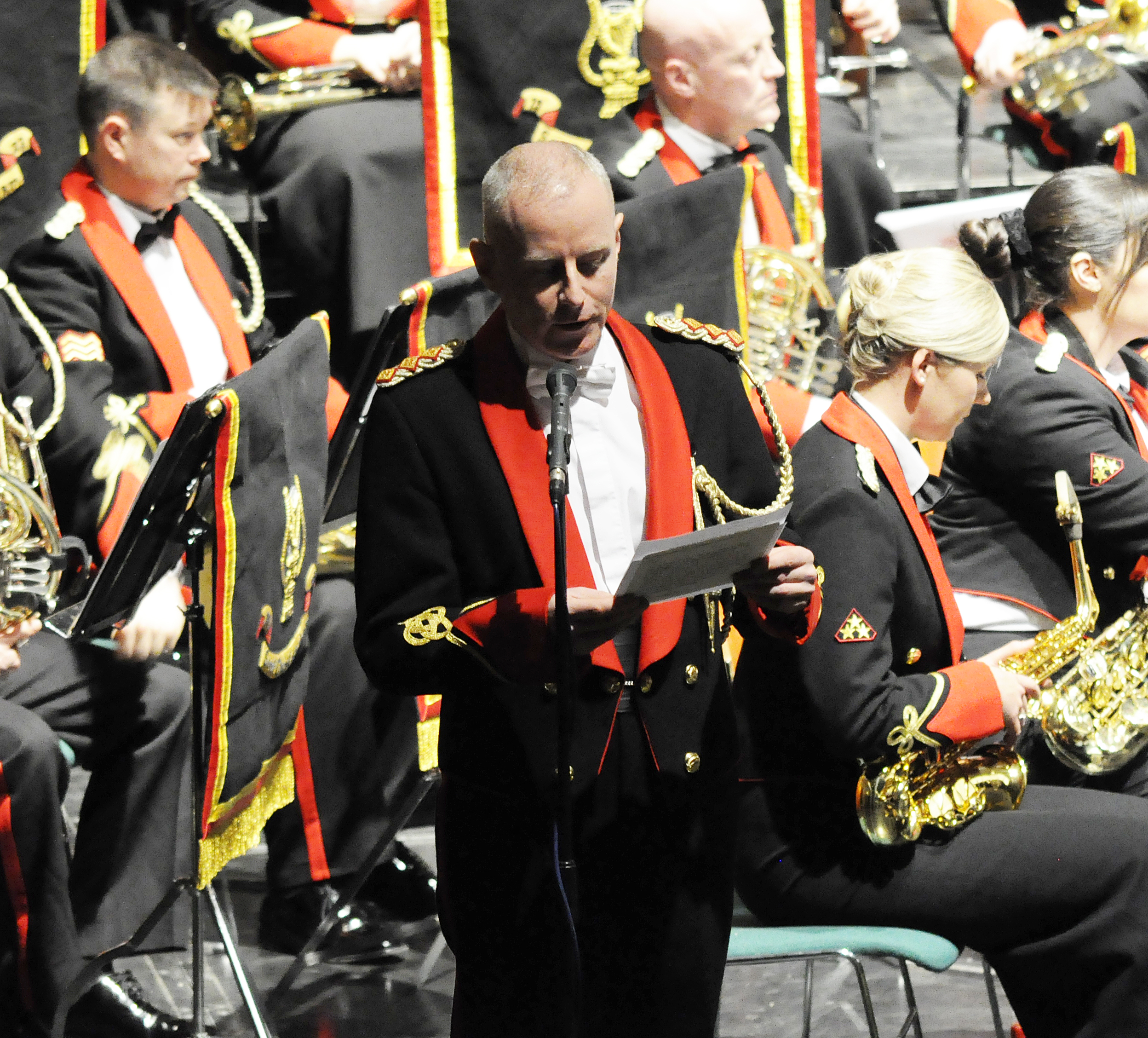
Irish Defence Forces Massed Bands Concert, 2014.

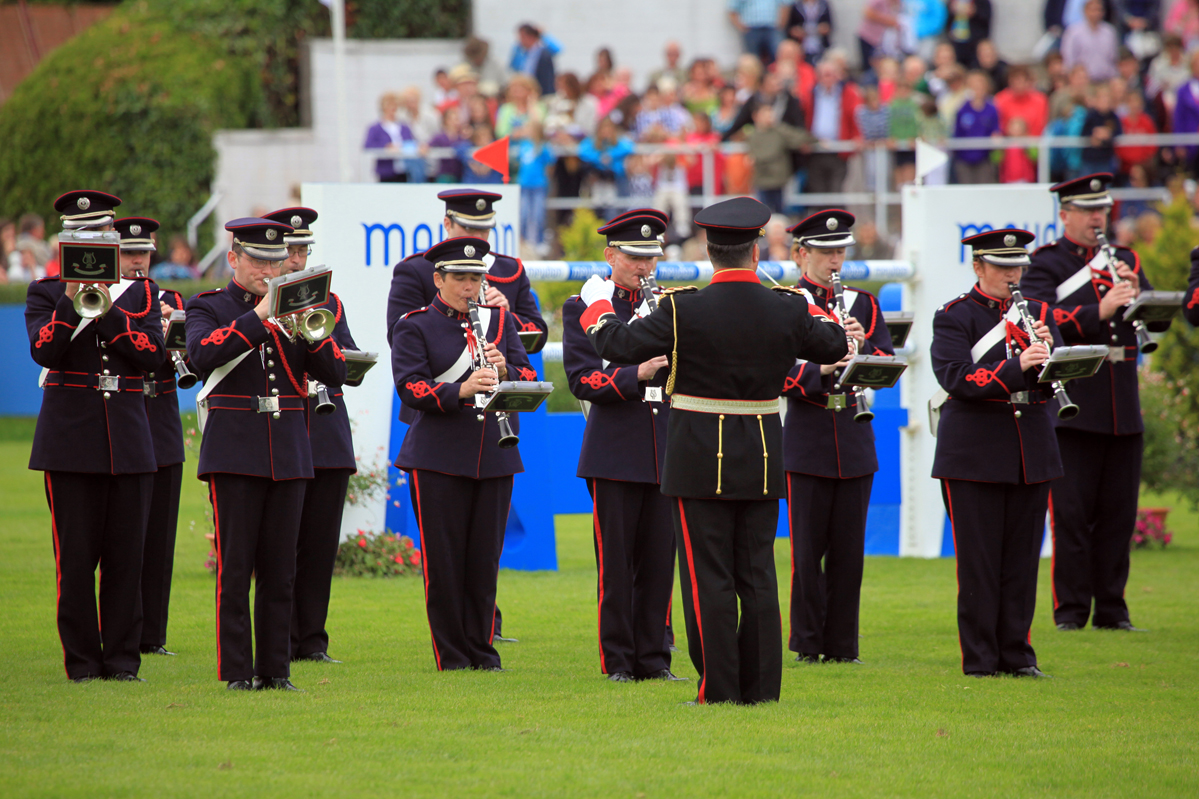
Army Bands at Dublin Horse Show and Nations Cup in 2010.

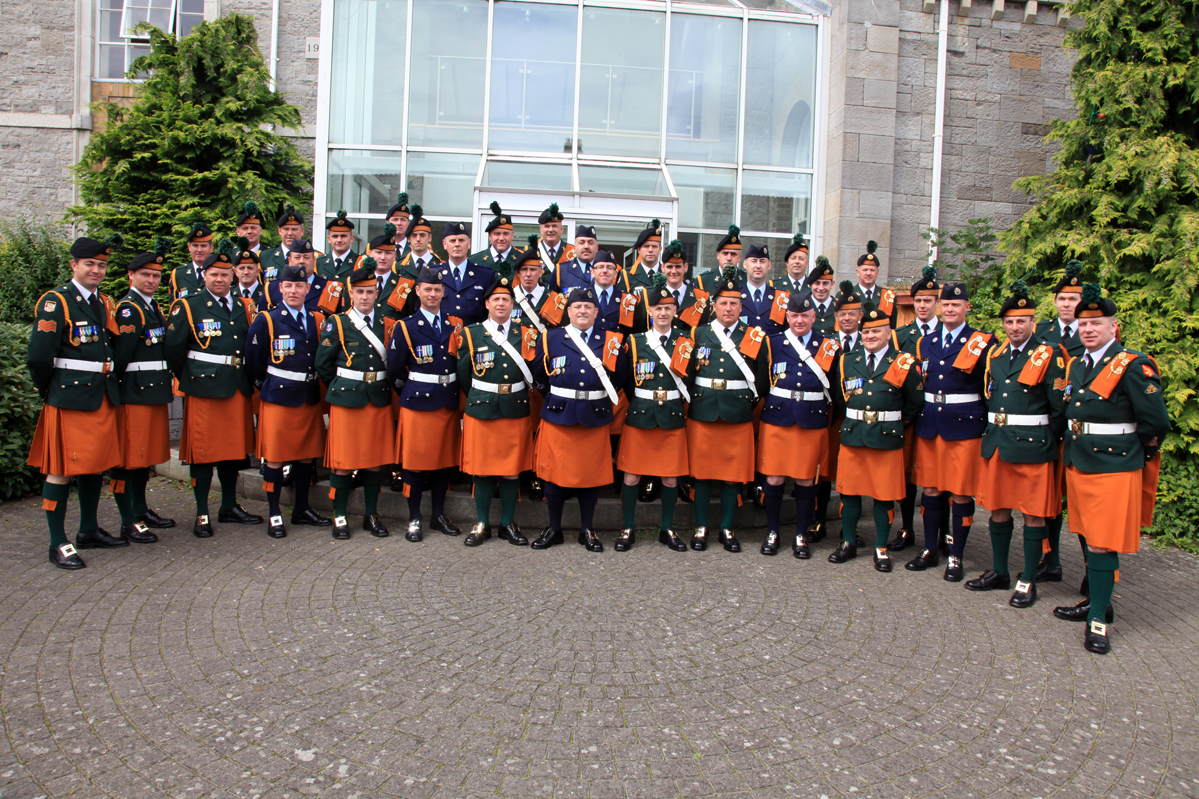
A family photo with the combined pipe bands.

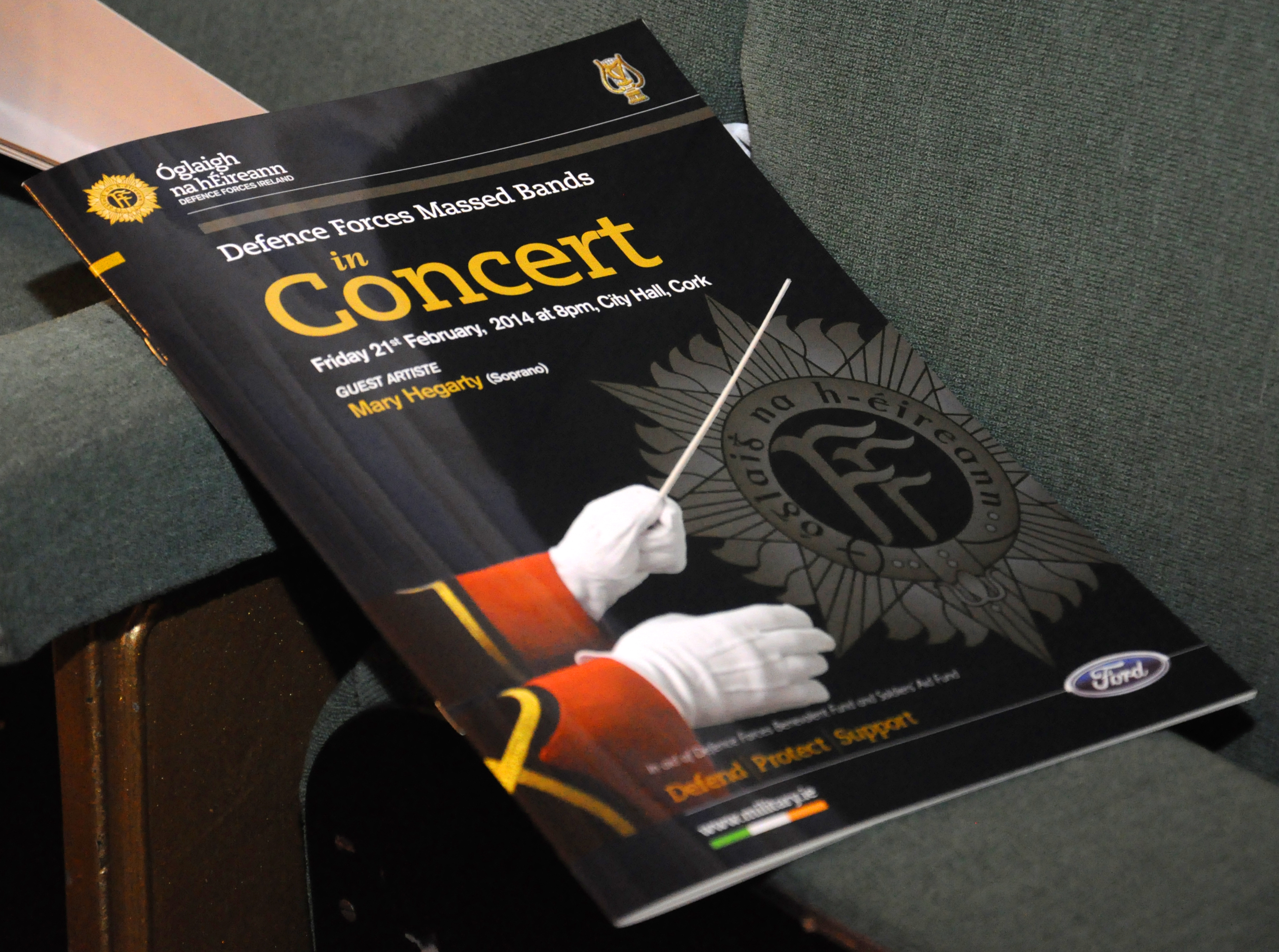
A programme for a Defence Forces concert in Cork.

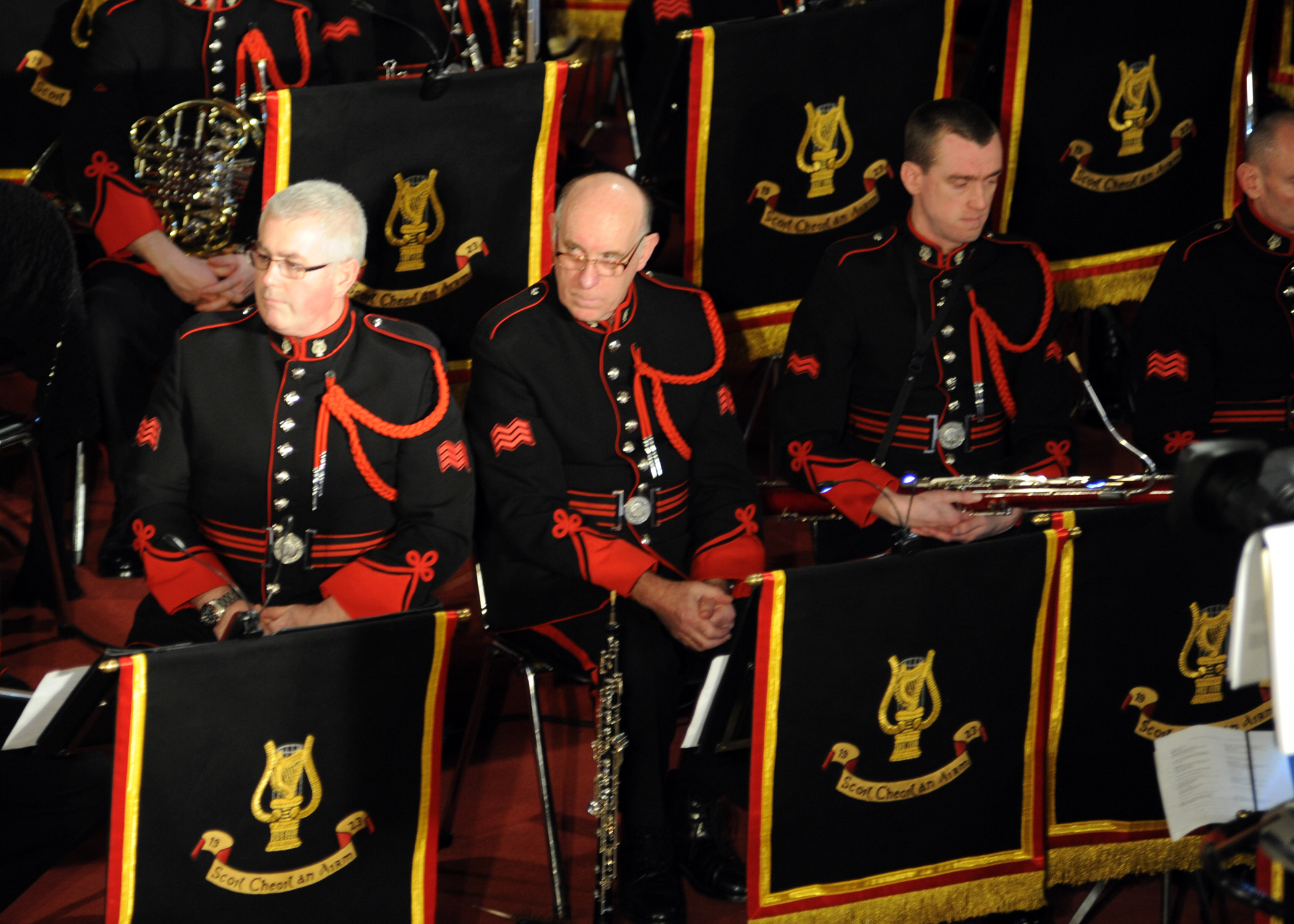
Army No. 1 Band in a symphonic setting.

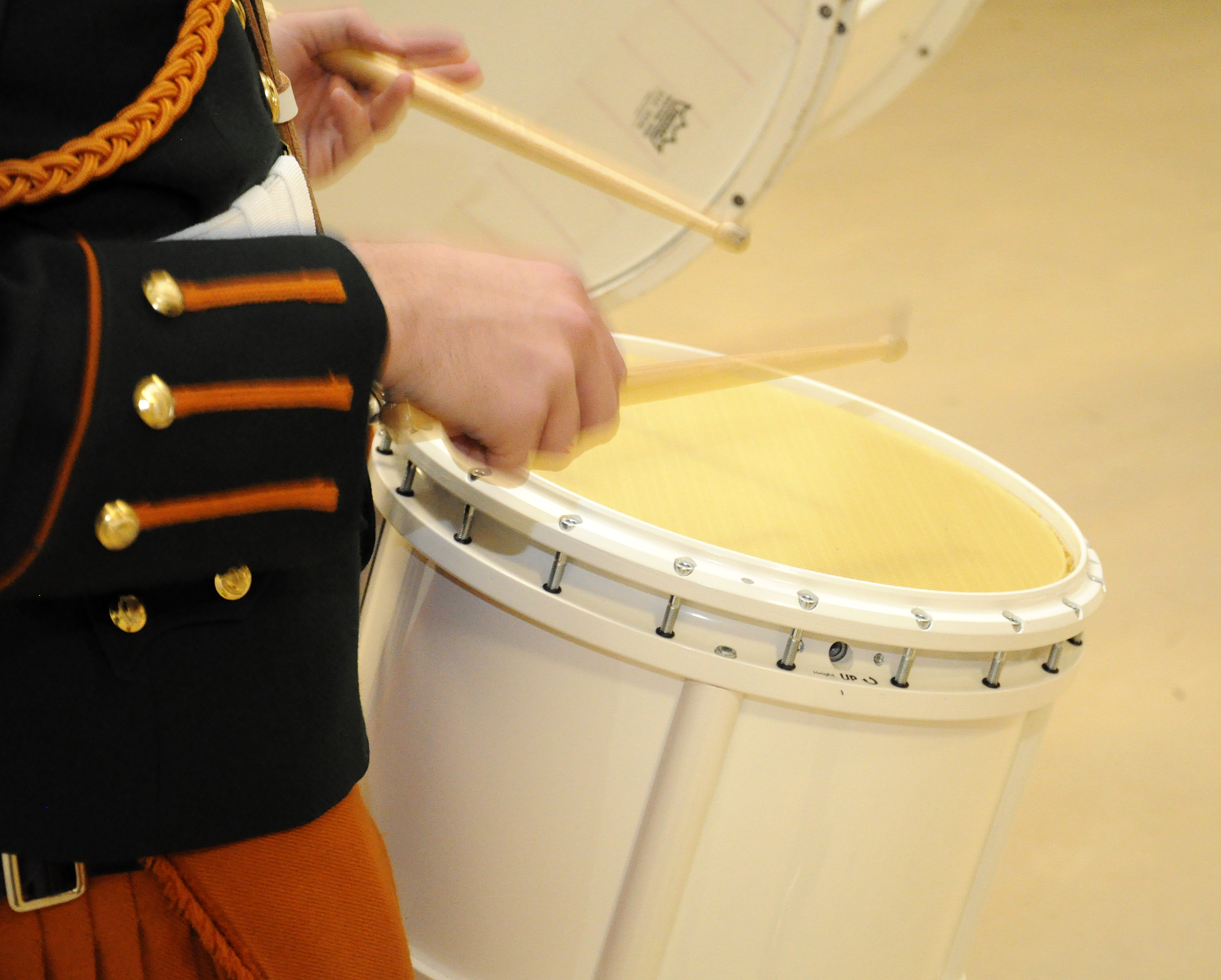
A drummer of an Irish pipe band.

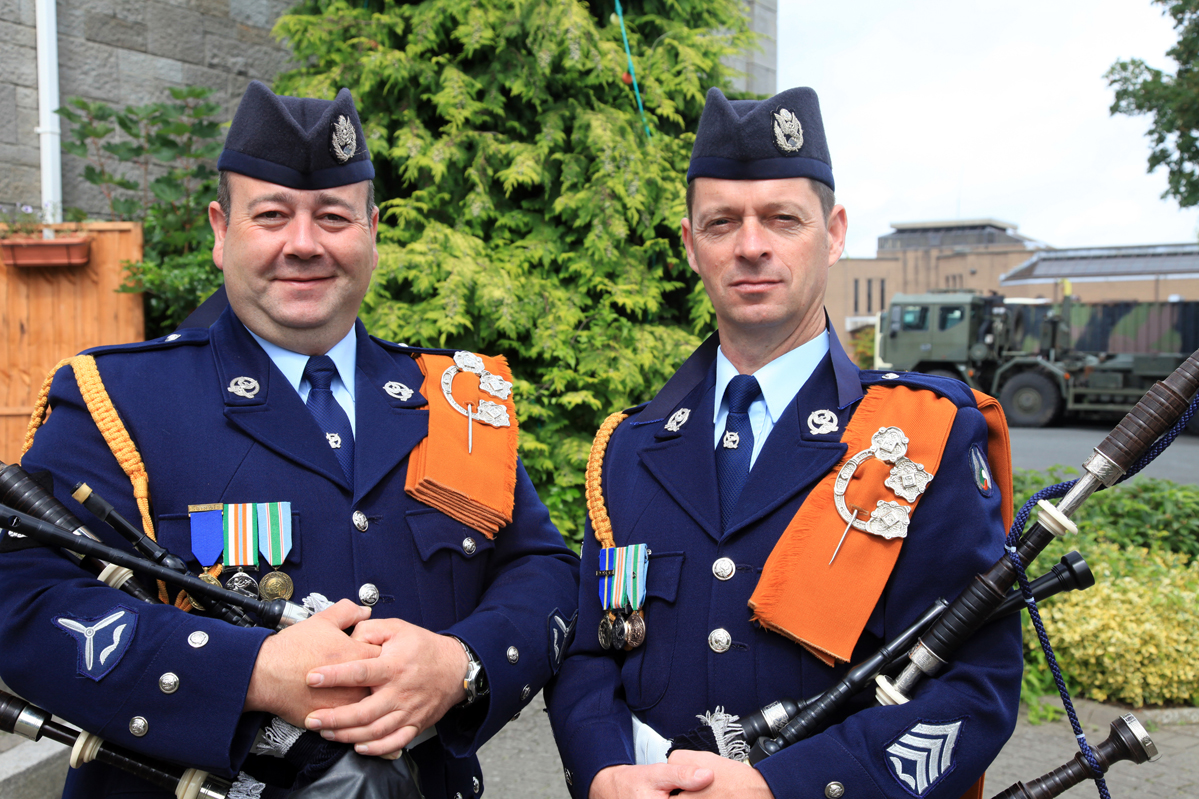
Two members of the Air Corps Pipe Band.

== See also ==
- Infantry Corps (Ireland)
- Royal Corps of Army Music
- Band of the Irish Guards
- United States Naval Academy Pipes and Drums
- Brazilian Marine Pipes, Drum and Bugle Corps
- Garda Band
