= Let Erin Remember =

Traditional Irish song

"Let Erin Remember" is a traditional Irish song written by Thomas Moore (1779–1852) and published in Irish Melodies vol. 2 (1808). It is sung to the air "The Little Red Fox". The lyrics reference romantic figures from Ireland's distant past, namely King Malachy and the Red Branch Knights, and lament the fact that the island has since come under foreign rule.

The song is often played on the bagpipes.

== Performances and use ==
In 1920, the song was played at the funeral of hunger striker Terence MacSwiney.

In the 1924 Olympics, the song was used by Irish athletes in the absence of a national anthem.

It is the regimental slow march of the Irish Guards.
