= 1st (Emperor Alexander) Guards Grenadiers =

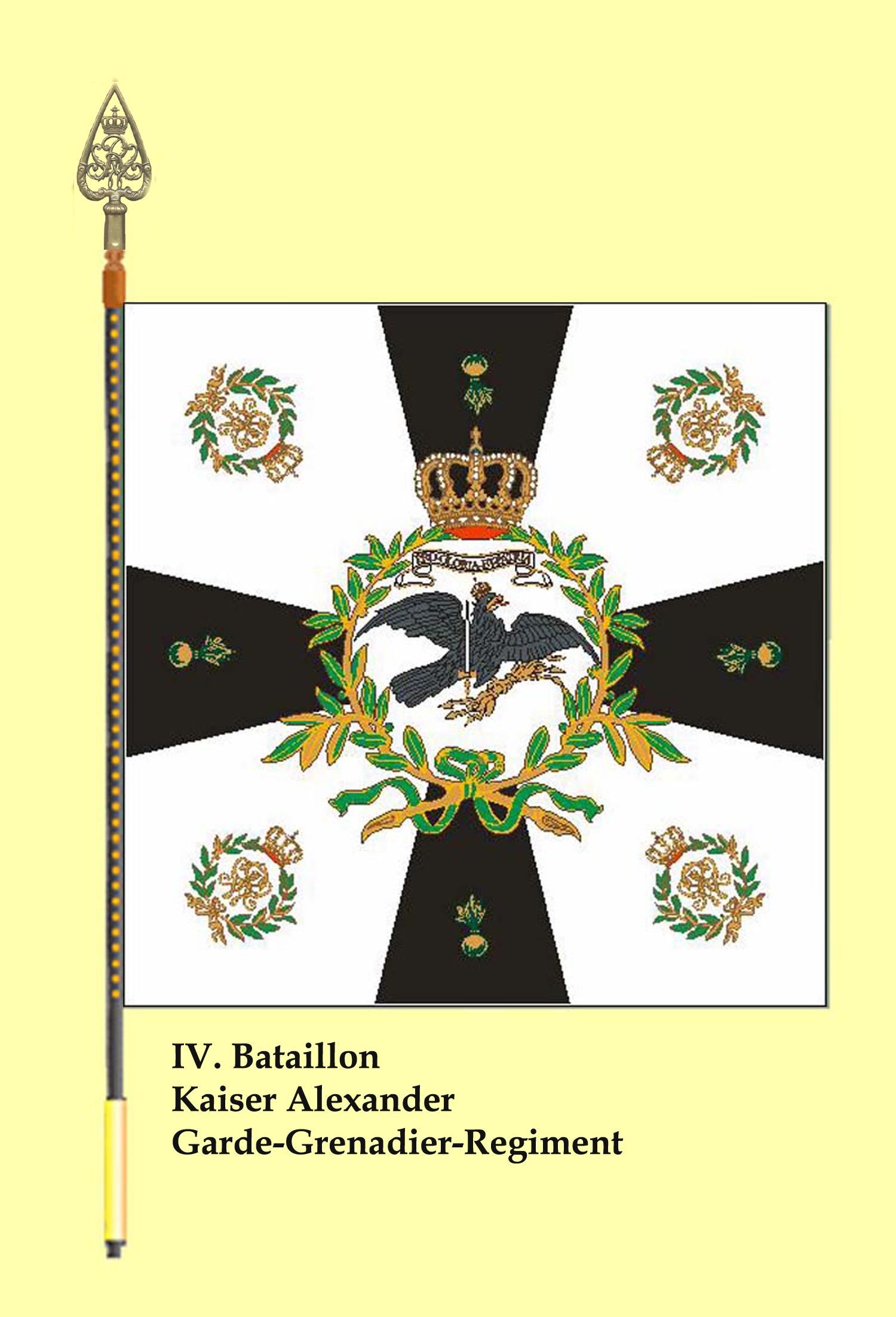
- Colors of the 4th battalion of the 1st Guards Grenadiers regiment
- Active: 14 October 1814 - 1920
- Country: German Empire
- Branch: Infantry
- Type: Regiment
- Garrison/HQ: Berlin
- Engagements: World War I

The 1st (Emperor Alexander) Guards Grenadiers (German: Kaiser Alexander Garde-Grenadier-Regiment Nr. 1, briefly Alexander-Regiment or Alexandriner) were an infantry regiment of the Guard Corps within the Royal Prussian Army and a Guards Grenadiers regiment of the Imperial German Army.

== History ==
The regiment's tradition dated back to 1626, when Elector George William of Brandenburg had a standing mercenary unit established during the Thirty Years' War, in order to defend the borders of his margraviate. The 1st Grenadier regiment was formed after the Napoleonic Wars of Liberation on 14 October 1814 by order of King Frederick William III of Prussia and was named in honour of Tsar Alexander I of Russia, who was also its first colonel-in-chief. The Russians reciprocated by designating the King of Prussia as the chief of the St. Petersburg Grenadiers. Parts of the formation had distinguished themselves in the 1807 Siege of Kolberg, most of its officers had been decorated with the Iron Cross or the order Pour le Mérite. The regiment was elevated to the rank of a royal guard on 18 February 1820.

First based near Alexanderplatz in Berlin, the garrison about 1900 moved into larger barracks near Friedrichstraße station, which until 1990 were occupied by the Friedrich Engels Guard Regiment of the East German National People's Army. The former parade ground today is the site of the Friedrich-Ludwig-Jahn-Sportpark.

After World War I, the regiment was demobilized on 27 November 1918, though volunteers were still employed by the Weimar government in the Silesian Uprisings and against the Bavarian Soviet Republic. Officially disbanded with effect of 31 December 1920, the remaining forces formed the 9th and 12th company of the Infantry Regiment 9 Potsdam, carrying the Alexandriner tradition further in the new Reichswehr military organization.

== See also ==
- List of Imperial German infantry regiments
