= List of compositions by John Philip Sousa =

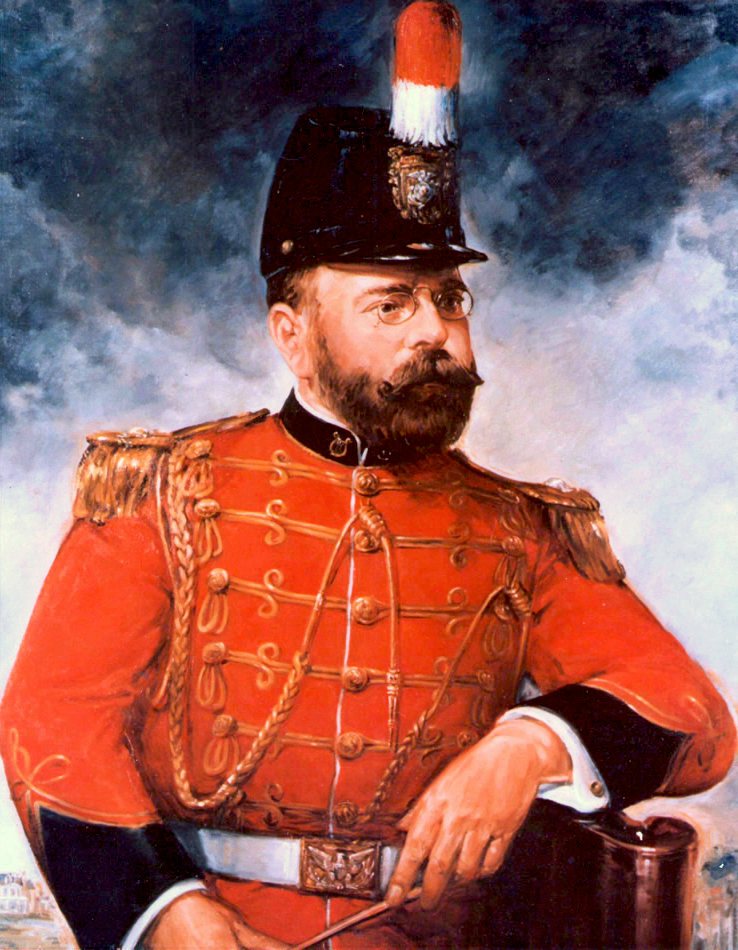
John Philip Sousa

This is a list of compositions by John Philip Sousa.

== By genre ==
=== Concert pieces ===
- The Summer Girl (1901)
- Willow Blossoms (1917)
- Easter Monday on the White House Lawn (1929)

=== Fantasies ===
- You're the Flower of My Heart – Sweet Adeline (1930)
- In the Sweet Bye and Bye (1876)
- Sounds from the Revivals (1876)
- The International Congress (1876)
- Medley (1877)
- Adamsonia (1879)
- Home Sweet Home (1879)
- In Parlor and Street (1880)
- Out of Work (1880)
- Tyrolienne (1880)
- Under the Eaves (1880)
- The Blending of the Blue and the Gray (1887)
- Songs of Grace and Glory (1892)
- The Salute of the Nations (1893)
- Rose, Thistle and Shamrock (1901)
- In the Realm of the Dance (1902)
- A Day at Great Lakes (1915)
- On the 5:15 (1916)
- In Pulpit and Pew (1917)
- A Study in Rhythms (1920)
- An Old-Fashioned Girl (1922)
- Music of the Minute (1922)
- The Merry-Merry Chorus (1923)
- On With The Dance (1923)
- Assembly of the Artisans (1924)
- Jazz America (1925)
- Where My Dreams Come True (1929)

=== Humoresques ===
- Look for the Silver Lining (1885)
- A Little Peach in the Orchard Grew (1885)
- The Stag Party (1885)
- Good-Bye (1892)
- The Band Came Back (1895)
- Showing Off Before Company (1919)
- Swanee (1920)
- Gallagher and Shean (1923)
- What Do You Do Sunday, Mary? (1924)
- The Mingling of the Wets and the Drys (1926)
- Follow the Swallow (1926)
- Oh, How I've Waited For You (1926)
- Among My Souvenirs (1928)

=== Overtures ===
- Rivals (1877)
- Tally-Ho! (1886)
- Vautour (1886)
- The Lamb's Gambol (1914)

=== Songs and other vocal works ===
- Fall Tenderly, Roses (1869)
- Day and Night (1873)
- Wilt Thou Be True (1873)
- Te Deum in B-Flat (1874)
- O My Country (1874)
- Only a Dream (1876)
- Only Thee (1876)
- Ah Me! (1876)
- The Song of the Sea (1876)
- The Magic Glass (1877)
- The Free Lunch Cadets (1877)
- Love Me Little, Love Me Long (1877)
- Lonely (1877)
- Hoping (1877)
- ‘Deed I Has to Laugh (1877)
- Mavourneen Asthore (1878)
- Smick, Smack, Smuck (1878)
- When He Is Near (1880)
- Pretty Patty Honeywood (1881)
- A Rare Old Fellow (1881)
- Star of Light (1882)
- We'll Follow Where the White Plume Waves (1884)
- The Window Blind (1887)
- Sweet Miss Industry (1887)
- My Own, My Geraldine (1887)
- O Ye Lilies White (1887)
- I Wonder (1888)
- O'Reilly's Kettledrum (1889)
- Do We? We Do (1889)
- Love That Comes When May-Roses Blow (1889)
- 2:15 (1889)
- There's Something Mysterious (1889)
- You'll Miss Lots of Fun When You're Married (1890)
- Nail the Flag to the Mast (1890)
- Reveille (1890)
- Stuffed Stork (1894)
- Maid of the Meadow (1897)
- The Trooping of the Colors (1898) (pageant)
- Oh, Why Should the Spirit of Mortal Be Proud? (1899) (hymn)
- It's a Thing We Are Apt to Forget (1900)
- The Messiah of Nations (1902) (hymn)
- I've Made My Plans for the Summer (1907)
- The Belle of Bayou Teche (1911)
- The Milkmaid (1914)
- We March, We March to Victory (1914) (hymn)
- Boots (1916)
- I Love Jim (1916)
- Come Laugh and Be Merry (1916)
- The Song of the Dagger (1916)
- Blue Ridge, I'm Coming Back to You (1917)
- The Love That Lives Forever (1917)
- When the Boys Come Sailing Home! (1918)
- We Are Coming (1918)
- The Toast (1918)
- Pushing On (1918)
- Lovely Mary Donnelly (1918)
- In Flanders Fields the Poppies Grow (1918)

Sousa and Walter Damrosch's 1918 arrangement of the "The Star-Spangled Banner" being performed by the United States Military Academy Band in 2000.

- "The Star-Spangled Banner" (1918), arrangement co-authored with Walter Damrosch, the basis of most contemporary performances of the song.
- The Fighting Race (1919)
- Non-Committal Declarations (1920) (vocal trio)
- The Last Crusade (1920) (ballad)
- While Navy Ships Are Coaling (1923)
- The Journal (1924)
- A Serenade in Seville (1924)
- There's a Merry Brown Thrush (1926)
- Crossing the Bar (1926)
- Forever and a Day (1927)
- Love's Radiant Hour (1928)
- Annabel Lee (1931)

=== Suites ===
- The Last Days of Pompeii (1893)
- Three Quotations (1895)
- Looking Upward (1902)
- At the King's Court (1904)
- People Who Live in a Glass House (1909)
- Dwellers of a Western World (1910)
- Tales of a Traveler (1911)
- Impressions at the Movies (1915)
- Camera Studies (1920)
- Leaves From My Notebook (1922)
- Cubaland (1925)

=== Tone poem ===
- Sheridan's Ride (1890)
- The Chariot Race (1891)

=== Trumpet and drum ===
- Four Marches For Regimental Drums And Trumpets (1884)
- Funeral March (1886)
- Gallant And Gay We'll March Away (1886)
- Good-Bye, Sweet Nannie Magee (1886)
- Hannah, My True Love (1886)
- Here's To Your Health, Sir! (1886)
- Hurrah! We Are Almost There (1886)
- Waltz (1886)
- With Steady Step (1886)

=== Waltzes and other dances ===
- Moonlight on the Potomac (1872)
- Cuckoo (1873) (galop)
- La Reine D'Amour (1874)
- Alexander (1876) (gavotte)
- Myrrha (1876) (gavotte)
- Sardanapalus (1877)
- Silver Spray (1878) (schottische)
- Paroles D'Amour (1880)
- Intaglio Waltzes (1884)
- Wissahickon (1885)
- Presidential Polonaise (1886)
- Sandalphon Waltzes (1886)
- La Reine de la Mer (1886)
- The Coquette (1887) (caprice)
- The Colonial Dames (1896)
- The Lady of the White House (1897)
- Queen of the Harvest (1899) (quadrille)
- The Gliding Girl (1912) (tango)
- With Pleasure (Dance Hilarious) (1912)
- Love's But a Dance, Where Time Plays the Fiddle (1923) (foxtrot)
- Peaches and Cream (1924) (foxtrot)
- The Coeds of Michigan (1925)
