= 24th Tony Awards =

1970 US theatrical awards ceremony

- Date: April 19, 1970
- Location: Mark Hellinger Theatre, New York City, New York
- Hosted by: Julie Andrews, Shirley MacLaine and Walter Matthau
- Most wins: Child's Play (5)
- Most nominations: Applause (11)

Television/radio coverage
- Network: NBC

The 24th Annual Tony Awards was broadcast by NBC television on April 19, 1970, from the Mark Hellinger Theatre in New York City. Hosts were Julie Andrews, Shirley MacLaine and Walter Matthau. The telecast garnered a 19.6 rating and a 41 share in the United States, making it the highest-rated Tonys TV broadcast in history.

== Eligibility ==
Shows that opened on Broadway during the 1969–1970 season before April 9, 1970 are eligible.

Original plays

- Angela
- Borstal Boy
- Brightower
- Butterflies Are Free
- Child's Play
- The Chinese and Dr. Fish
- Cop-Out
- Criss-Crossing
- The Gingham Dog
- Gloria and Esperanza
- Grin and Bare It!
- Home Fires
- Indians
- Last of the Red Hot Lovers
- Love Is a Time of Day
- The Mundy Scheme
- My Daughter, Your Son
- No Place to Be Somebody
- Norman, Is That You?
- Operation Sidewinder
- Paris Is Out!
- A Patriot for Me
- The Penny Wars
- Postcards
- Sheep on the Runway
- Songs from Milk Wood
- A Teaspoon Every Four Hours
- Watercolor

Original musicals

- Applause
- Billy
- Blood Red Roses
- Buck White
- Coco
- Cry For Us All
- Gantry
- Georgy
- Jimmy
- La Strada
- Look to the Lilies
- Minnie's Boys
- Oh! Calcutta!
- Purlie
- Trumpets of the Lord

Play revivals

- Camino Real
- Candida
- A Flea in Her Ear
- The Front Page
- Hamlet
- Harvey
- Henry V
- Sganarelle
- The Miser
- Our Town
- Private Lives
- Three Men on a Horse
- Three Sisters
- The Time of Your Life
- Tiny Alice

== The ceremony ==
Presenters: Clive Barnes, Mia Farrow, Elliott Gould, Claire Bloom, Michael Caine, Jack Cassidy, David Frost, Cary Grant, Patricia Neal, George C. Scott, James Stewart, Maggie Smith, Robert Stephens.

Musicals represented:

- Applause ("Applause" - Bonnie Franklin and Company/"Welcome to the Theatre" and "Applause" (reprise) - Lauren Bacall and Company)
- Coco ("Always Mademoiselle" - Katharine Hepburn and Company)
- Purlie ("I Got Love" - Melba Moore/"Walk Him up the Stairs" - Cleavon Little and Company)

== Winners and nominees ==
Winners are in bold

| Best Play | Best Musical |
|---|---|
| **Borstal Boy – Frank McMahon**; Child's Play – Robert Marasco; Indians – Arthur Kopit; Last of the Red Hot Lovers – Neil Simon | **Applause**; Coco; Purlie |
| Best Performance by a Leading Actor in a Play | Best Performance by a Leading Actress in a Play |
| **Fritz Weaver – Child's Play as Jerome Malley**; James Coco – Last of the Red Hot Lovers as Barney Cashman; Frank Grimes – Borstal Boy as Young Behan; Stacy Keach – Indians as Buffalo Bill | **Tammy Grimes – Private Lives as Amanda Prynne**; Geraldine Brooks – Brightower as Sara Brightower; Helen Hayes – Harvey as Veta Louise Simmons |
| Best Performance by a Leading Actor in a Musical | Best Performance by a Leading Actress in a Musical |
| **Cleavon Little – Purlie as Purlie**; Len Cariou – Applause as Bill Sampson; Robert Weede – Cry For Us All as Edward Quinn | **Lauren Bacall – Applause as Margo Channing**; Katharine Hepburn – Coco as Coco Chanel; Dilys Watling – Georgy as Georgina 'Georgy' Parkin |
| Best Performance by a Supporting or Featured Actor in a Play | Best Performance by a Supporting or Featured Actress in a Play |
| **Ken Howard – Child's Play as Paul Reese**; Joseph Bova – The Chinese and Dr. Fish as Mr. Lee; Dennis King – A Patriot for Me as Baron von Epp | **Blythe Danner – Butterflies Are Free as Jill Tanner**; Alice Drummond – The Chinese and Dr. Fish as Mrs. Lee; Eileen Heckart – Butterflies Are Free as Mrs. Baker; Linda Lavin – Last of the Red Hot Lovers as Elaine Navazio |
| Best Performance by a Supporting or Featured Actor in a Musical | Best Performance by a Supporting or Featured Actress in a Musical |
| **René Auberjonois – Coco as Sebastian Baye**; Brandon Maggart – Applause as Buzz Richards; George Rose – Coco as Louis Greff | **Melba Moore – Purlie as Lutiebell Gussie Mae Jenkins**; Bonnie Franklin – Applause as Bonnie the Gypsy; Penny Fuller – Applause as Eve Harrington; Melissa Hart – Georgy as Meredith |
| Best Direction of a Play | Best Direction of a Musical |
| **Joseph Hardy – Child's Play**; Milton Katselas – Butterflies Are Free; Tómas Mac Anna – Borstal Boy; Robert Moore – Last of the Red Hot Lovers | **Ron Field – Applause**; Michael Benthall – Coco; Philip Rose – Purlie |
| Best Choreography | Best Scenic Design |
| **Ron Field – Applause**; Michael Bennett – Coco; Grover Dale – Billy; Louis Johnson – Purlie | **Jo Mielziner – Child's Play**; Howard Bay – Cry for Us All; Ming Cho Lee – Billy; Robert Randolph – Applause |
| Best Costume Design | Best Lighting Design |
| **Cecil Beaton – Coco**; Ray Aghayan – Applause; W. Robert Lavine – Jimmy; Freddy Wittop – A Patriot for Me | **Jo Mielziner – Child's Play**; Tharon Musser – Applause; Thomas Skelton – Indians |

== Special awards ==
- Sir Noël Coward for his multiple and immortal contributions to the theatre
- Alfred Lunt and Lynn Fontanne
- New York Shakespeare Festival, for pioneering efforts on behalf of new plays
- Barbra Streisand – Star of the Decade

=== Multiple nominations and awards ===
These productions had multiple nominations:

- 11 nominations: Applause
- 7 nominations: Coco
- 6 nominations: Child's Play
- 5 nominations: Purlie
- 4 nominations: Last of the Red Hot Lovers
- 3 nominations: Borstal Boy, Butterflies Are Free and Indians
- 2 nominations: Billy, The Chinese and Dr. Fish, Cry for Us All, Georgy and A Patriot for Me

The following productions received multiple awards.

- 5 wins: Child's Play
- 4 wins: Applause
- 2 wins: Coco and Purlie

== See also ==
- 42nd Academy Awards
