= Applause (disambiguation) =

Applause is an expression of approval by the act of clapping.

Applause may also refer to:

== Film ==
- Applause (1929 film), an American musical
- Applause (1944 film), a Greek drama
- Applause (2009 film), a Danish drama

== Enterprises ==
- Applause (toy company), a toy company founded in 1966

== Music ==
- Applause (musical), a 1970 musical based on the 1950 film All About Eve
  - "Applause" (Bonnie Franklin song), the musical's title track
- "Applause", a song by Janis Ian from her 1974 album Stars
- Applause Records, a short-lived record label founded in 1981
- "Applause" (Lady Gaga song), 2013
- "Applause", a song written by Diane Warren from the 2022 film Tell It Like a Woman
- Applause, a guitar model manufactured by the Ovation Guitar Company

== Publishing ==
- Applause Books, an imprint of the Hal Leonard Corporation
- Applause Magazine, a publication of the Denver Center for the Performing Arts
- Applause Magazine, a publication for Mary Kay Cosmetics sellers
- Applause Magazine, an online Australian fashion magazine

== Other uses ==
- Daihatsu Applause, a compact car first manufactured in 1989

== See also ==
- Applause, Applause (disambiguation)
