= Marvin Minoff =

American film and television producer

- Born: June 26, 1931; Brooklyn, New York City, US
- Died: November 11, 2009 (aged 78); Los Angeles, California, US
- Resting place: Mount Sinai Memorial Park Cemetery
- Education: Syracuse University; New York University
- Occupations: Film and TV producer
- Spouse: Bonnie Franklin (m. 1980)
- Children: 2
- Military career
- Allegiance: United States
- Branch: United States Army
- Service years: (during Korean War)

Marvin Minoff (June 26, 1931 – November 11, 2009) was an American film and television producer best known for having produced The Nixon Interviews by British journalist David Frost of former U.S. President Richard Nixon in 1977. Minoff also co-produced, along with his business partner Mike Farrell and others, the 1998 film Patch Adams, starring Robin Williams.

== Biography ==
Minoff, the son of theatrical haberdasher Harry Minoff, was originally from Brooklyn, New York. He attended Abraham Lincoln High School, Syracuse University and New York University. He then enlisted in the United States Army during the Korean War.

== Career ==
His career in the entertainment industry began as a talent agent at the William Morris Agency in New York City. Minoff then moved to International Famous Artists (IFA; the forerunner of International Creative Management – ICM). He rose to Vice President of the motion picture department at IFA. Minoff represented a number of notable figures during his fifteen years at the talent agencies, including Cicely Tyson, screenwriters Bruce Joel Rubin and David W. Rintels, and director Sidney Lumet. He also packaged several films, including the 1970 movie, Love Story and the 1971 blockbuster film, The French Connection.

In 1974, Minoff left IFA and the talent agency business to become the president of David Paradine Television, which had been founded by journalist David Frost. While president of the company, Minoff teamed with television producer John Birt to co-executive produce The Nixon Interviews by Frost of Richard Nixon. The interviews, which took place three years after Nixon left office, were broadcast in syndication in 1977. The Nixon Interviews would later be adapted into a Broadway play, which in turn, formed the basis for the 2008 film Frost/Nixon, directed by Ron Howard, which was nominated for an Academy Award for Best Picture. Actor Keith MacKechnie portrayed Minoff in the film.

As president of Paradine Television, Minoff also produced interviews with former Secretary of State Henry Kissinger and the Shah of Iran, Mohammad Reza Pahlavi. Additionally, Minoff produced several television films for Paradine, including Dynasty (based on the novel, "The Ordeal of Patty Hearst" by James Michener) and Portrait of a Rebel: The Remarkable Mrs. Sanger (starring his future wife, Bonnie Franklin, as Margaret Sanger).

Minoff left David Paradine Television in the early 1980s and worked for a time as an indie producer. In 1985, he partnered with actor and producer Mike Farrell to form Farrell/Minoff Productions, which created a series of made-for-TV movies. Minoff and Farrell would work closely together in a professional partnership for the next twenty-five years. Both Farrell and Minoff had signed a deal with Walt Disney Pictures to develop projects in 1986. Their many television movies featured such actors as Fred Savage, Ed Asner, Helen Hunt, Jill Clayburgh, Missy Crider, Patricia Wettig, and Tess Harper.

Together, Minoff and Farrell produced two feature films. Their first film was 1988's Dominick and Eugene for Orion Pictures, which earned actor Tom Hulce a Golden Globe nomination for best actor. Farrell and Minoff later co-produced Patch Adams in 1998, which starred Robin Williams.

== Death ==
He died at his home in Los Angeles on November 11, 2009, at the age of 78. He married actress Bonnie Franklin in 1980, and she became stepmother to his two children, Jed and Julie, from a previous marriage.

Minoff was buried at Mount Sinai Memorial Park Cemetery in Hollywood Hills.
