= Vincent's Pizza Park =

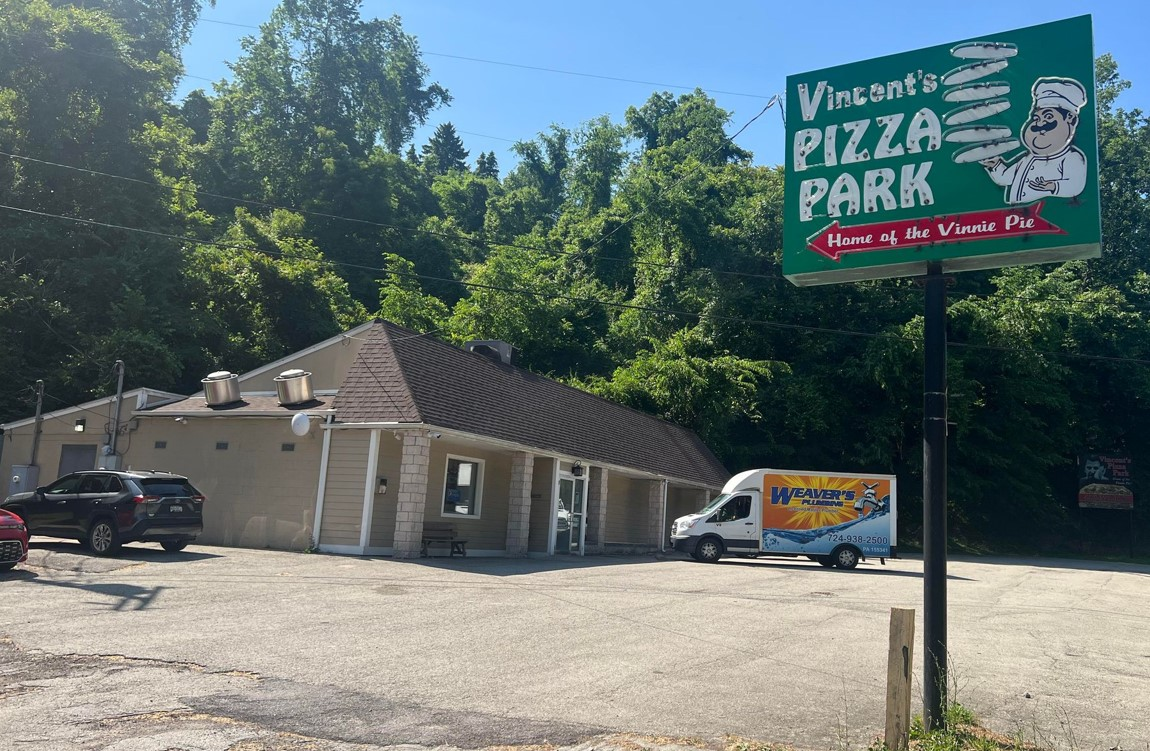

Restaurant information
- Established: 1952
- Owners: Vincent Chianese (founder); Toni Zollner (current owner)
- Food type: Pizzeria
- Location: 998 Ardmore Blvd, Pittsburgh, Pennsylvania, 15221, United States
- Website: www.vincentspizzapark.com

Vincent's Pizza Park is a pizzeria restaurant located in Pittsburgh, Pennsylvania, United States. The restaurant has been labeled as an iconic Pittsburgh restaurant and a landmark of Forest Hills, Pennsylvania.

== Information ==
Vincent Chianese was the restaurant's founder. His father was from Italy and his mother was French Canadian. He was originally trained as a tailor. He went to San Francisco in 1950 to learn how to make pizza from his uncle and returned to Pittsburgh after his uncle sold his pizzeria. After returning, he started selling pizzas at an auction and later founded Vincent's Pizza Park in 1952. While pizza is a common food today, many of the locals in the area did not know what pizza was at the time. Chianese gained notoriety over his lifetime for often being seen cooking while smoking a cigarette (with ashes sometimes falling into the pizza) and was cited as a larger than life figure with an off-color demeanor. Chianese died in 2010 at the age of 85.

The restaurant is famous for its "Vinnie Pie" style of pizza, which is notable for its generous amount of toppings, a thick crust, its abundance of grease and for its size which often leaves customers with leftovers. The restaurant offers pizza in three sizes: 9", 11" and 19" inch pizzas and notably does not serve their pizza in a takeout box, but on top of a piece of cardboard covered in paper sheets. The restaurant has never offered deliveries, has never advertised nor was it open for lunch. The restaurant also did not sell anything but pizza during some of its existence. The restaurants peak time is during Pittsburgh Steelers football games, where 20 pizzas are often baked at once. The restaurant has also been known to ship pizzas overnight across the United States.

The restaurant closed in 2012 over rent, franchise and royalty issues. The restaurant was supposed to be put up for sheriff's sale in 2012, but the sheriff's sale request was withdrawn. The restaurant was renovated and reopened in 2013 by Chianese's daughter, Toni Zollner and continues to operate to this day.

In 2020, Vincent's donated over 140 pizzas during the COVID-19 pandemic to front-line workers.

== In popular culture ==
The restaurant was featured in Philipp Meyer's 2009 novel, "American Rust" and in the 2015 Pittsburgh horror television series, "It's Alive". Chianese and Vincent's Pizza Park appeared in the 1998 film, Dominick and Eugene.

== Gallery ==
Vincent's Pizza Park
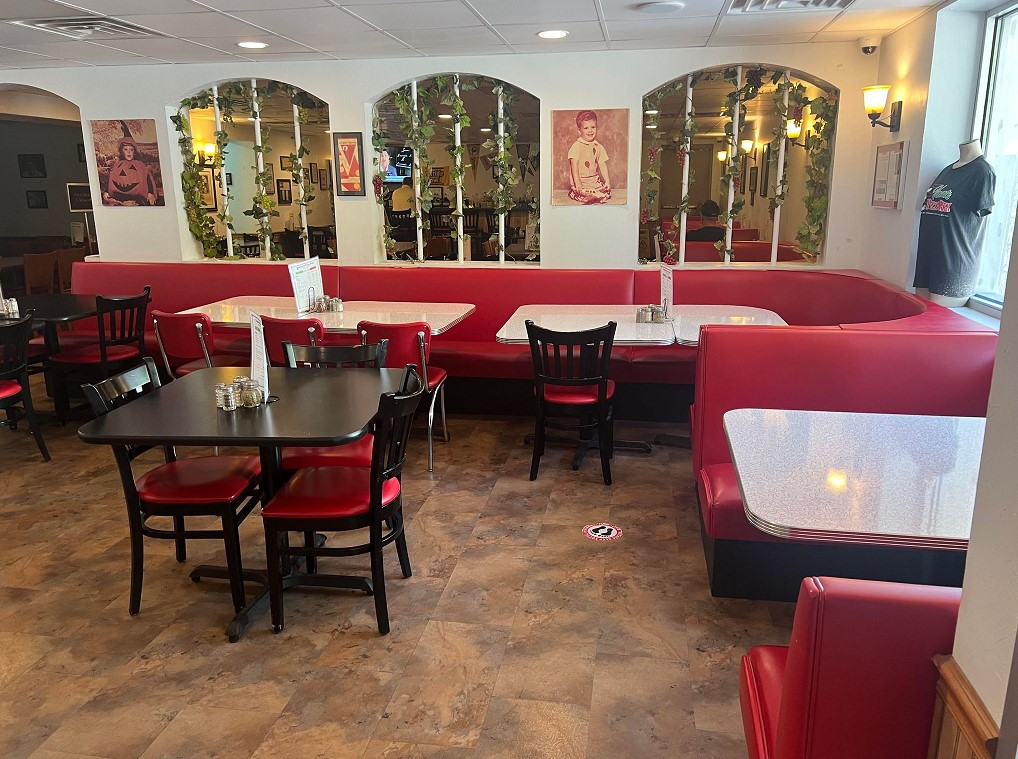
The dining room

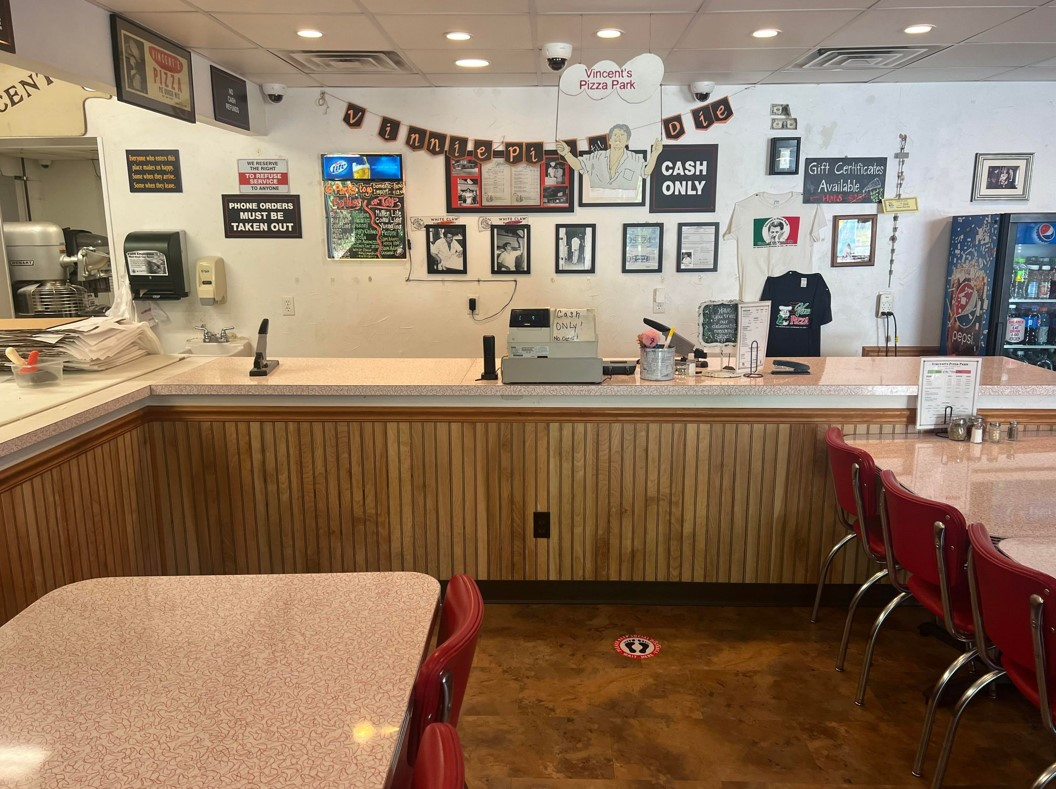
The counter at Vincent's Pizza Park

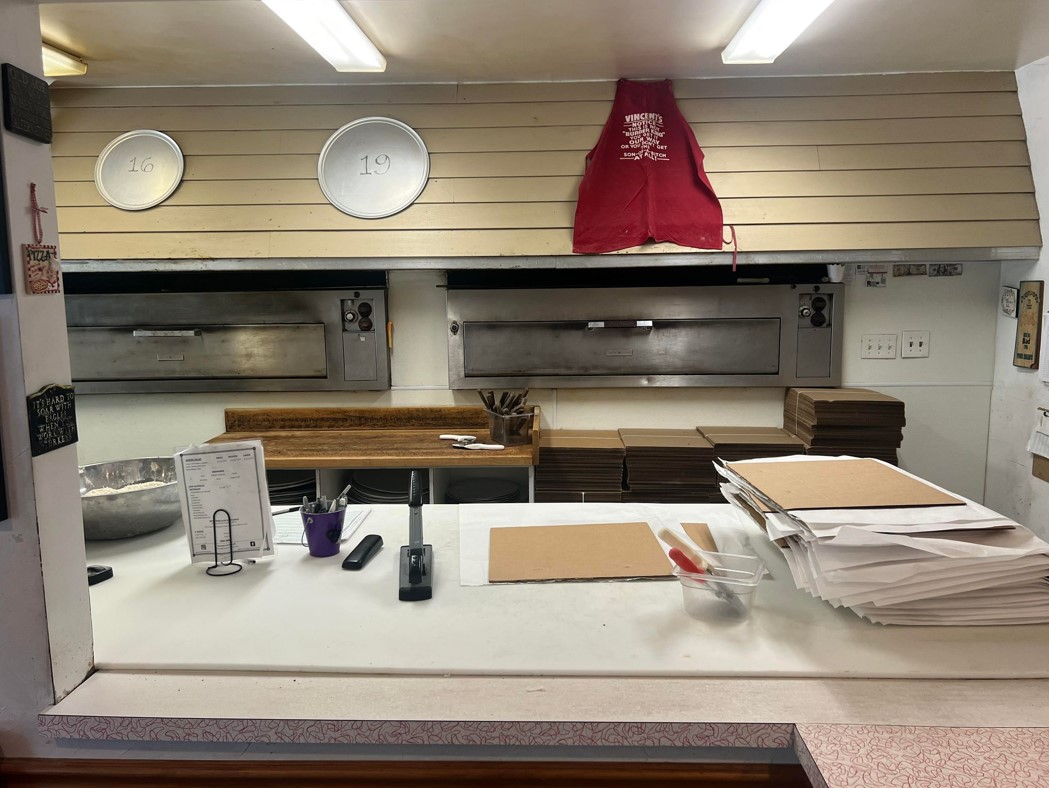
The oven's at Vincent's Pizza Park

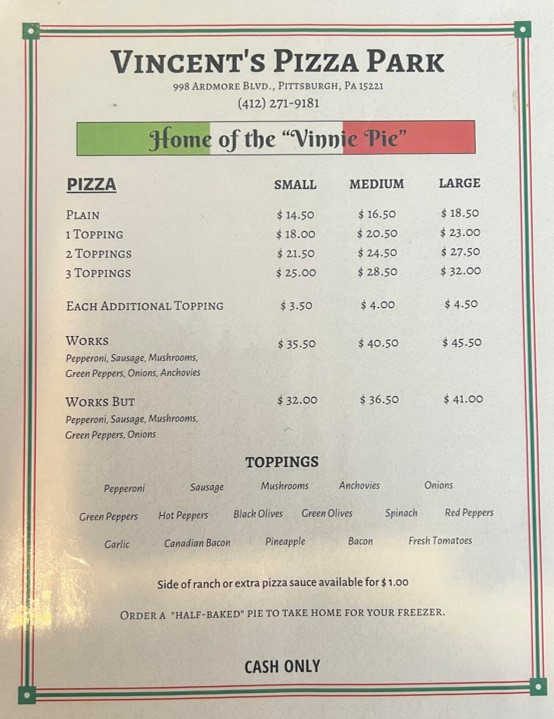
The 2023 menu at Vincent's Pizza Park
