= Tomás Mac Anna =

Tomás Mac Anna (born Thomas Francis McCann; 5 March 1924 – 17 May 2011) was an Irish theatre director and playwright. He was nominated for the Tony Award for Best Direction of a Play in 1970 for Borstal Boy.

Born in Dundalk, he was educated at the College of Art in Dublin, worked as a customs officer 1945–47, and then at the Damer Theatre and the Abbey Theatre as a producer of Irish language plays, subsequently becoming Artistic Adviser to the Abbey Board in 1966, then Artistic Director 1972–79 and 1984–85. His work as an innovative stage director was crucial in modernizing the Abbey style after its re-opening in 1966. He directed Borstal Boy, which after its transfer to New York, won the Tony Award for Best Play and earned him a nomination for Best Direction of a Play at the 24th Tony Awards in 1970.

He co-wrote the Irish pantomimes for years. Amongst his original plays are Winter Wedding (1956), Dear Edward (1973), Scéal Scéalaí (1977), and Glittering Spears (1983), a drama-documentary on O'Casey's The Silver Tassie.

He died in Bray, County Wicklow, aged 84.
