= Applause, Applause =

Applause, Applause may refer to:

- Applause, Applause (TV series), Canadian television series
- Applause, Applause..., 1984 Soviet film
- "Applause, Applause", a song from the soundtrack to the film Give a Girl a Break
- "Applause Applause", a 1976 Australian film
- "Applause Applause", a book by Jean Thompson

== See also ==
- Applause (disambiguation)
- "Applause Applause Applause", a song by They Might Be Giants from the album My Murdered Remains
