= Shadow Man (1988 film) =

1988 film by Piotr Andrejew

- Directed by: Piotr Andrejew
- Written by: Piotr Andrejew
- Produced by: Guys Versluis
- Starring: Tom Hulce; Manouk van der Meulen; Jeroen Krabbé; Thom Hoffman
- Cinematography: Wit Dabal
- Music by: Edvard Grieg; Wim Mertens
- Distributed by: RCV; Hilversum; New World Pictures
- Release date: 1988
- Running time: 93 minutes
- Countries: Netherlands; United Kingdom
- Languages: English; Dutch

Shadow Man is a 1988 film about a Polish-Jewish refugee during a fictional war in Amsterdam.

== Premise ==
The story of a war refugee who's hiding in Amsterdam.

== Cast ==
- Tom Hulce as David Rubenstin / The Shadow Man
- Jeroen Krabbé as Theo
- Manouk van der Meulen as Monique
- Trudy Labij as Mevrouw Christine Wisse
- Thom Hoffman as Fuchs
- Karin Bloemen as Bella
- Hans Hoes as Brosch
- Hans Dagelet as Postbode
- Jasper Faber as Barman
- Roelant Radier as Hunter (credited as Roeland Radier)
- Vincent Lancee as Policeman

== Production ==
The film was written and directed by Polish director Piotr Andrejew, recognized in Europe for his short movies, with the photography by Wit Dabal and the music by Edvard Grieg and Wim Mertens. A Dutch-British co-production in English, with some minor Dutch dialogue.

Patsy Kensit backed out one day before shooting; Manouk van der Meulen took over her role.

== Honours ==
- Nominated Golden Leopard for Best Film at the Locarno International Film Festival, Switzerland; 1989.
- Opening Film Netherlands Film Festival, Utrecht, Netherlands; 1988.
