= Bonnie Franklin =

American actress (1944–2013)

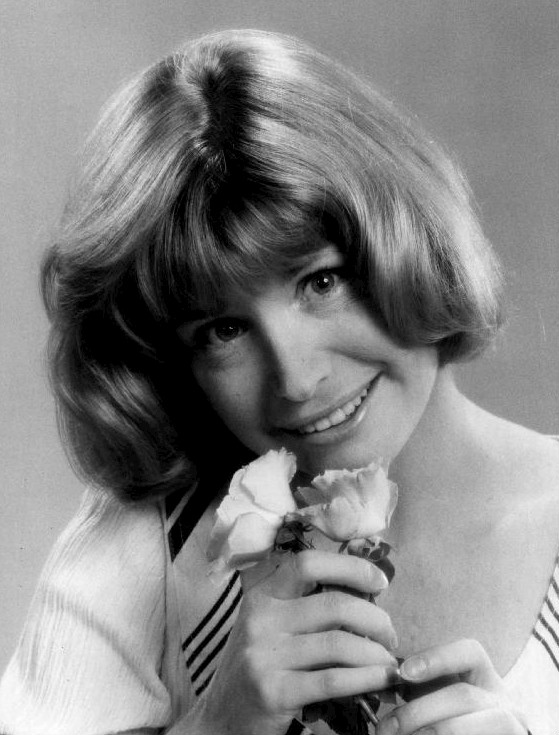
- Franklin in One Day at a Time, 1976
- Born: Bonnie Gail Franklin; January 6, 1944; Santa Monica, California, US
- Died: March 1, 2013 (aged 69); Los Angeles, California, US
- Education: Beverly Hills High School; University of California, Los Angeles
- Occupations: Actress, director
- Years active: 1952–2012
- Known for: One Day at a Time; Applause
- Spouses: Ronald Sossi (m. 1967; div. 1970); Marvin Minoff (m. 1980; died 2009)

Bonnie Gail Franklin (January 6, 1944 – March 1, 2013) was an American actress. She is best known for her leading role as Ann Romano in the television series One Day at a Time (1975–1984). She was nominated for Emmy, Tony, and Golden Globe Awards.

== Early life ==
Franklin was born January 6, 1944, in Santa Monica, California, the daughter of Claire (née Hersch) (1911-2014) and Samuel Benjamin Franklin (1903-1997), an investment banker who founded the Beverly Hills, California chapter of B'nai B'rith. Her parents were both Jewish immigrants; her father from Russia and her mother from Romania; they married in Montreal before moving to the US.

Her family moved to Beverly Hills when she was 13 years old. She graduated from Beverly Hills High School in 1961. She attended Smith College in Massachusetts, performing in an Amherst College production of Good News as a freshman, but she returned to California, enrolling at University of California, Los Angeles (UCLA) and earning her bachelor's degree in English in 1966.

== Career ==
Franklin first appeared on television at age 9 in The Colgate Comedy Hour. and in 1954 played the role of Martha Cratchit in the Shower of Stars television show version of “A Christmas Carol”. At age 11, she appeared in a non-credited role in the Alfred Hitchcock film The Wrong Man (1956). She and Tuesday Weld are the two giggling girls in the doorway of an apartment.

In the 1960s, she portrayed a teenage feature character in "You're the Judge," a short educational film about baking sponsored by Procter & Gamble and featuring the use of Crisco. She debuted on Broadway in 1970 in the musical Applause, earning a Tony Award nomination. Her recording of "Applause", the show's title track, was the most successful Broadway song of the season, vocally upstaging the star of the show, Lauren Bacall. Although she was on stage for only a fraction of the running time of that show, Franklin attracted a lot of attention. In its July 1970 edition, for example, Vogue published a photo spread in which the magazine predicted big careers for three young women: Melba Moore, Sandy Duncan, and Franklin.

Franklin appeared at the Paper Mill Playhouse in Millburn, New Jersey in both George M! and A Thousand Clowns. From June 22 through September 2, 1973, she appeared as Carrie Pipperidge in a production of Rodgers and Hammerstein's Carousel at the Jones Beach Theater on Long Island in New York in a cast that included John Cullum and Barbara Meister.

She guest-starred on several television series, including The Man from U.N.C.L.E. ("The Gazebo in the Maze Affair" from 1965) and Hazel ("Hazel Sits It Out" from 1965). She had a semi-regular role in the ABC series Gidget. She directed several episodes of the 1980s sitcom Charles in Charge and the syndicated comedy series The Munsters Today.

Franklin was best known for her portrayal of divorced mother Ann Romano on the television situation comedy One Day at a Time (1975–1984). In April 2011, Franklin and other cast members from One Day at a Time accepted the "Innovators Award" from the TV Land cable channel—one of several awards in the annual event. The citation on the TV Land web site reads:

the Innovator Award...is given to a television series that carved out new territory, tackled important issues of its day and helped re-defined its genre. The series One Day at a Time was a hybrid drama/comedy, addressed such taboo topics as pre-marital sex, suicide, sexual harassment and more, breaking barriers and paving the way for future shows to tackle these issues as well. Developed and written in part by TV visionary Norman Lear, One Day at a Time aired on CBS for nine seasons from 1975–1984. Starring Bonnie Franklin, Valerie Bertinelli and Mackenzie Phillips as Ann Romano, Barbara Cooper and Julie Cooper, the series revolved around a family headed by a single mother (Franklin) that relocates to Indianapolis, where their new apartment building super, Dwayne Schneider (Pat Harrington Jr.), befriends them. Also taking part in the cast reunion is Glenn Scarpelli, who joined the series in 1980 as the son of Ann's boyfriend, Nick.

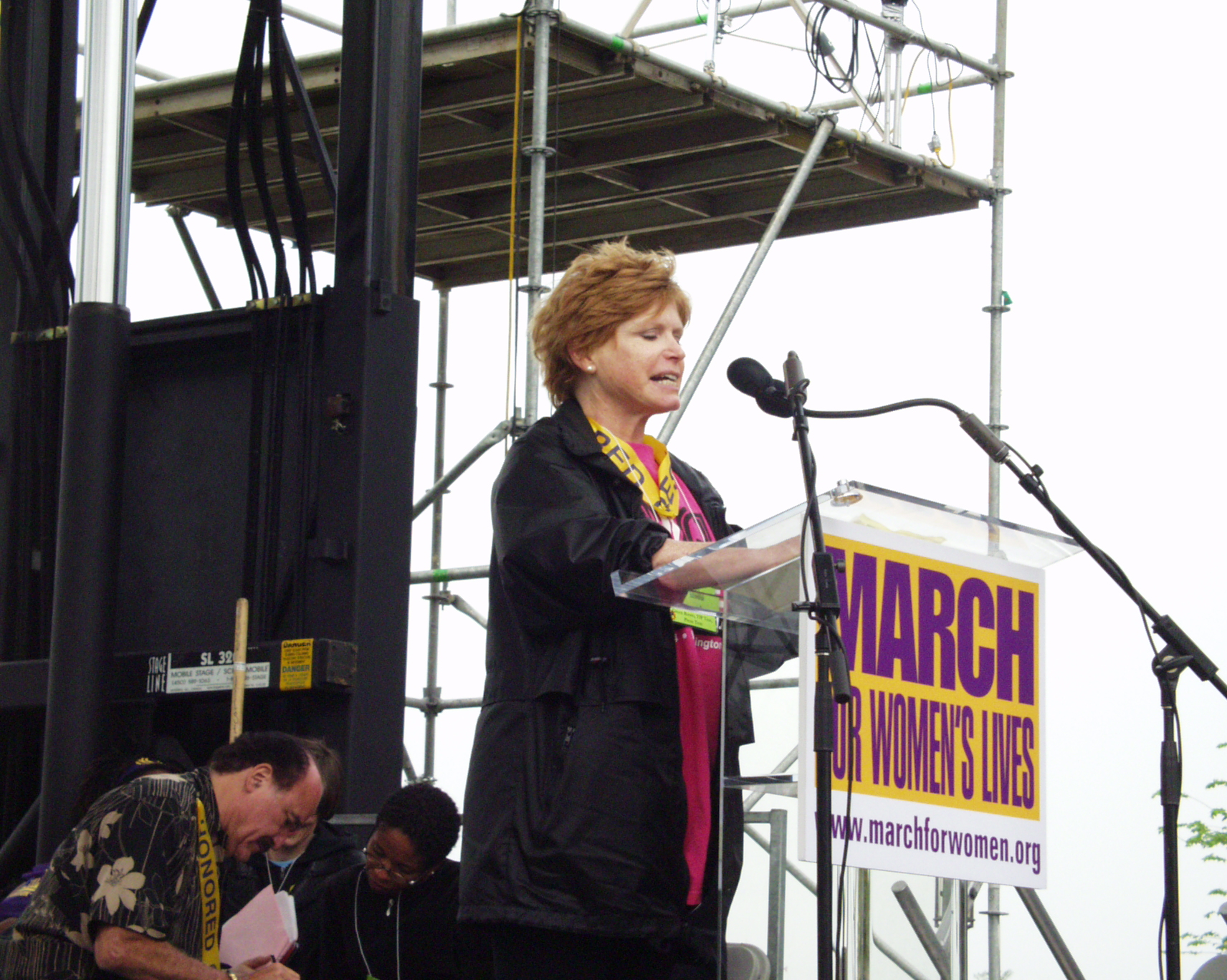
Bonnie Franklin speaks to crowd at March For Women's Lives in 2004.

A Democrat, she supported Walter Mondale's campaign in the 1984 presidential election.

In 1988, Franklin appeared at the Bucks County Playhouse and at the Pocono Playhouse, both in Pennsylvania, in the title role of Annie Get Your Gun. Also in 1988, she appeared with Tony Musante at the Westside Arts Theatre (in Manhattan) in Frankie and Johnny in the Clair de Lune by Terrence McNally. She later performed in Who's Afraid of Virginia Woolf? at the Pittsburgh Public Theater (July 1998). In 1997, she appeared at Ford's Theatre, Washington, D.C., in All I Really Need to Know I Learned in Kindergarten (September 1999). In 2005, she appeared with Bruce Weitz at the New Theatre Restaurant in Overland Park, Kansas in 2 Across (August–September 2011). She played "Ouiser" in a production of Steel Magnolias at the Rubicon Theater, Ventura, California (October 4–14, 2011).

In the mid and late 2000s, Franklin appeared in nearly a dozen staged readings in the Greater Los Angeles area with Classic and Contemporary American Playwrights (CCAP), which she founded in 2001 with her sister Judy. During the 2006–2007 season, she appeared in the drama Toys in the Attic, written by Lillian Hellman. She appeared in Neil Simon's Broadway Bound at the Pico Playhouse in January 2008.

In 2005, she was reunited with her One Day at a Time co-stars Mackenzie Phillips, Valerie Bertinelli and Pat Harrington for the 60-minute CBS TV special retrospective The One Day at a Time Reunion. In 2011, she was reunited once again with Bertinelli on Hot in Cleveland, playing the mother of Bertinelli's character's boyfriend.

On April 28, 2012, she was among several stars who appeared at the 28th annual Southland Theatre Artists Goodwill Event (STAGE) benefit, titled Original Cast 3, at the Saban Theatre in Beverly Hills to benefit AIDS Project Los Angeles. The event raised more than $200,000 for APLA's work with clients living with HIV and AIDS in Los Angeles County. Franklin and other original-cast members from a variety of musicals performed songs with which they are associated. Franklin sang the title song from Applause, which she had originally introduced on Broadway in 1970.

Franklin appeared in several episodes of the daytime drama The Young and the Restless. The episodes were broadcast in August 2012, and only a month later she was diagnosed with terminal pancreatic cancer. The actress was cast as a nun, Sister Celeste, who came to the assistance of Victor Newman when he had amnesia while working at a shipping port in Los Angeles. In addition to her work in the theater and on television, Franklin performed in cabaret at various venues, including Le Mouches, Grand Finale, The Eighty-Eights, Triad, and The Oak Room at the Algonquin Hotel—all in New York City—and at Odette's in New Hope, Pennsylvania.

She was scheduled to appear in Joan Didion's one-woman play The Year of Magical Thinking at the Ensemble Theatre Company of Santa Barbara in April 2013, but withdrew because of illness.

== Personal life ==
Franklin was married twice, first to playwright Ronald Sossi from 1967 to 1970, and then to film producer Marvin Minoff for 29 years, from 1980 until his death on November 11, 2009. Minoff had been the executive producer of a television movie, Portrait of a Rebel: The Remarkable Mrs. Sanger, which starred Franklin as Margaret Sanger, before the couple married in 1980. She had two stepchildren, Jed and Julie Minoff.

== Illness and death ==
On September 24, 2012, a family spokesman announced that Franklin had pancreatic cancer and was undergoing treatment. On March 1, 2013, at age 69, Franklin died at her home in Los Angeles.

== Filmography ==
| Year | Title | Role | Notes |
|---|---|---|---|
| 1954 | Shower of Stars | Susan Cratchit | Episode: "A Christmas Carol" |
| 1956 | The Kettles in the Ozarks | Betty | Uncredited role |
| 1956 | The Wrong Man | Young Girl | Uncredited role |
| 1959 | A Summer Place | Girl in Dormitory | Uncredited role |
| 1964 | Mr. Novak | Sally | 2 episodes: "How Does Your Garden Grow?" and "The People Doll: You Wind It Up, and It Makes Mistakes" |
| 1965 | Invisible Diplomats | Trudy | Short |
| 1965 | Hazel | Wife of Young Couple House-Hunting | Episode: "Hazel Sits It Out" |
| 1965 | Profiles in Courage | Deborah | Episode: "Prudence Crandall" |
| 1965 | Karen | Charlotte Burns | Episode: "Holiday in Ski Valley" |
| 1965 | The Man from U.N.C.L.E. | Peggy Durrance | Episode: "The Gazebo in the Maze Affair" |
| 1965 | Gidget | Jean / Janie | 2 episodes: "Chivalry Isn't Dead" and "Too Many Cooks" |
| 1965–1966 | Please Don't Eat the Daisies | Dorie | 3 episodes |
| 1966 | The Munsters | Janice | Episode: "Herman's Sorority Caper" |
| 1974 | The Law | Bobbie Stone | TV movie |
| 1975 | Bronk | Rita | Episode: "The Pickoff" |
| 1975–1984 | One Day at a Time | Ann Romano | 208 episodes TV Land Award - Innovator Award (2012); Nominated - Primetime Emmy Award for Outstanding Lead Actress in a Comedy Series (1982); Nominated - Golden Globe Award for Best Actress – Television Series Musical or Comedy (1982-1983); Nominated -TV Land Award - The "She Works Hard for the Money" Award (Favorite Working Mom) (2007); Nominated -TV Land Award - Mad Ad Man (or Woman) of the Year (2008) |
| 1977 | The Love Boat | Stacy Skogstad | Episode: "The Captain and the Lady/One If by Land/Centerfold" |
| 1978 | Hanna-Barbera's All-Star Comedy Ice Revue | Herself / co-host | TV special |
| 1978 | A Guide for the Married Woman | Shirley | TV movie |
| 1979 | Breaking Up Is Hard to Do | Gail | TV movie |
| 1980 | Portrait of a Rebel: The Remarkable Mrs. Sanger | Margaret Sanger | TV movie |
| 1983 | Your Place... or Mine | Alexandra | TV movie |
| 1987 | Sister Margaret and the Saturday Night Ladies | Sister Margaret | TV movie |
| 1992 | Hearts Are Wild | Gloria McKenzie | Episode: "The Catch" |
| 1994 | Burke's Law | Theresa St. Claire | Episode: "Who Killed the Soap Star?" |
| 1996 | Almost Perfect | Mary Ryan | 2 episodes: "Moving In: Part 1" and "Moving In: Part 2" |
| 2000 | Touched by an Angel | Carol Anne Larkin | Episode: "Reasonable Doubt" |
| 2005 | The One Day at a Time Reunion | Herself / Ann Romano | TV special |
| 2011 | Hot in Cleveland | Agnieszka | "Bad Bromance," S2E2 |
| 2012 | The Young and the Restless | Sister Celeste | 11 episodes; final appearance |
