= A Christmas Carol (Shower of Stars) =

- Shower of Stars episode
- Episode no.: Season 1 Episode 4
- Directed by: Ralph Levy (produced and directed)
- Written by: Maxwell Anderson (adaptation and lyrics)
- Cinematography by: George E. Diskant, A.S.C.
- Editing by: Robert Fritch, A.C.E.
- Production code: 004
- Original air date: December 23, 1954

Guest appearances
- Fredric March as Scrooge; Basil Rathbone as Marley's Ghost; Ray Middleton as Fred; Bob Sweeney as Bob Cratchit; with the Roger Wagner Chorale

Episode chronology
← Previous "Entertainment on Wheels"	Next → "Show Stoppers"

"A Christmas Carol" is the December 23, 1954 episode of the hourlong American television anthology variety series, Shower of Stars. The episode is an adaptation of Charles Dickens' 1843 novella of the same name, and was filmed by Desilu Productions, Inc.

Shower of Stars had a four-season run from 1954 to 1958 on CBS, alternating every fourth week with the dramatic anthology series Climax!. It was also one of the few American TV productions of the time telecast in the UK, in 1956. Unusually for the time, it was presented on film and in color.

A Christmas Carol was reprinted in black-and-white for schools and libraries by Carousel Films (which distributed many CBS television specials on 16mm film). The original broadcast included a live prologue and epilogue with host William Lundigan; a black-and-white kinescope preserved these segments on film. A Christmas Carol has been released on DVD, in black-and-white.

The production boasted a script and lyrics by noted American playwright Maxwell Anderson, and a score by Bernard Herrmann. Fredric March, in his only known portrayal of the role, starred as Ebenezer Scrooge, and Basil Rathbone portrayed Marley's Ghost.

The production featured few songs, but those it did feature forced the adapters to severely condense the story, especially the final third. Rather than having a Ghost of Christmas Yet to Come, the adaptation featured a mynah bird, who leads Scrooge to a graveyard in which he sees not only his own grave, but that of Tiny Tim.

The script added an unusual twist to the story in having the Ghost of Christmas Past (Sally Fraser) and the Ghost of Christmas Present (Ray Middleton) be portrayed by the same actors who played Scrooge's sweetheart Belle and his nephew Fred, respectively, and Scrooge not only notices the resemblance, but mistakes the Ghost of Christmas Present for his nephew.

== Cast ==
- Fredric March as Scrooge
- Basil Rathbone as Marley's Ghost
- Ray Middleton as Fred and the Ghost of Christmas Present
- Bob Sweeney as Bob Cratchit
- Christopher Cook as Tiny Tim
- Sally Fraser as Belle and the Ghost of Christmas Past
- Craig Hill as Young Scrooge
- Queenie Leonard as Mrs. Cratchit
- Rex Evans as Solicitor
- Tony Pennington as His Companion
- William Griffiths as The Book Buyer
- Peter Miles as Peter Cratchit
- Janine Perreau as Belinda Cratchit
- Bonnie and Judy Franklin as Susan and Martha Cratchit
- June Ellis as The Housekeeper
- Dick Elliott as Fezziwig (uncredited)

== See also ==
- Adaptations of A Christmas Carol
