= Mary Orr =

American dramatist

- Born: December 21, 1910; New York City, New York, U.S.
- Died: September 22, 2006 (aged 95); Manhattan, New York, U.S.
- Other name: Mary Orr Denham
- Education: American Academy of Dramatic Arts; Syracuse University
- Occupations: Actress; author
- Spouse: Reginald Denham (m. 1947; died 1983)

Mary Caswell Orr (December 21, 1910 – September 22, 2006) was an American actress and author whose short story "The Wisdom of Eve", published in the May 1946 issue of Cosmopolitan, was the basis of the Academy Award-winning film All About Eve (1950). In private life, Orr used her married name, Mary Orr Denham.

== Early life ==
Orr was born in Brooklyn, New York. She and her family relocated to Canton, Ohio when she was a girl, and she grew up there and in Cleveland, Ohio. She graduated from Ward–Belmont College and studied at Syracuse University and the American Academy of Dramatic Arts in Manhattan.

== Career ==
As an actress, Orr performed on Broadway in Berlin (1931), Child of Manhattan (1932), Chrysalis (1932), Jupiter Laughs (1940), Wallflower (1944), Dark Hammock (1944), Sherlock Holmes (1953), and The Desperate Hours (1955).

According to Orr's obituary in the New York Times, "The Wisdom of Eve" was loosely based upon an unnamed woman who had been the secretary of Viennese actress Elisabeth Bergner. Orr wrote a radio adaptation that aired on NBC in 1949, and that led to the movie being made. While she did not receive screen credit for All About Eve (she had sold the story to Twentieth Century Fox for $5,000), she did receive a Screen Writers Guild award for her original story.

An alternative hypothesis to the Ruth Hirsch (later known as Martina Lawrence)-Elisabeth Bergner origin was the rivalry between Tallulah Bankhead and Lizabeth Scott (her understudy) during the production of Thornton Wilder's The Skin of Our Teeth. Broadway legend had it that Bankhead was being victimized by Scott, who was, supposedly, the real-life Eve Harrington.

In 1964, Orr and her husband, director-playwright Reginald Denham, adapted the short story into a play of the same name, which was produced off-Broadway in 1979. In 1970, a hit Broadway musical, Applause, was based on All About Eve and gave a credit to Mary Orr for the original story. She wrote a sequel to "The Wisdom of Eve" titled "More About Eve," which was published in Cosmopolitan in July 1951.

In addition to Applause, Mary Orr and Reginald Denham had four plays that opened on Broadway. Their first and most successful, Wallflower, ran for 192 performances in 1944. Round Trip was presented in 1945, while Dark Hammock started its performances in 1946. The fourth, Be Your Age, made its Broadway appearance in 1953. She also acted in Broadway plays, including two of her own: Wallflower and Dark Hammock. The film version of Wallflower was released in 1948.

Alone or with her husband, Orr wrote five books and forty television scripts. Her first novel, Diamond in the Sky (1956), was about the New York theater.

== Death ==
Orr died of pneumonia in Manhattan in 2006, aged 95. She was predeceased by her husband, who died in 1983.

== Works ==
- Diamonds in the Sky (1957)
- A Place to Meet (1961)
- The Tejera Secrets (1974)
- Rich Girl, Poor Girl (1975)
- Lucky Star (1986)
