= Patch Adams (film) =

1998 film by Tom Shadyac

- Theatrical release poster
- Directed by: Tom Shadyac
- Screenplay by: Steve Oedekerk
- Based on: Gesundheit: Good Health Is a Laughing Matter by Patch Adams and Maureen Mylander
- Produced by: Mike Farrell; Barry Kemp; Marvin Minoff; Charles Newirth; Marsha Garces Williams
- Starring: Robin Williams; Monica Potter; Philip Seymour Hoffman; Bob Gunton; Daniel London; Peter Coyote
- Cinematography: Phedon Papamichael Jr.
- Edited by: Don Zimmerman
- Music by: Marc Shaiman
- Production companies: Blue Wolf Productions; Bungalow 78 Productions; Farrell/Minoff
- Distributed by: Universal Pictures
- Release date: December 25, 1998
- Running time: 115 minutes
- Country: United States
- Language: English
- Budget: $50–90 million
- Box office: $202.3 million

Patch Adams is a 1998 American comedy-drama film directed by Tom Shadyac, written by Steve Oedekerk, and starring Robin Williams in the title role, Monica Potter, Philip Seymour Hoffman, Bob Gunton, Daniel London and Peter Coyote. Set in the late 1960s and early 1970s, it is loosely based on the life story of medical doctor Hunter "Patch" Adams and the book Gesundheit: Good Health Is a Laughing Matter by Adams and Maureen Mylander.

Patch Adams was released by Universal Pictures on December 25, 1998. The film received generally negative reviews from critics, with criticism for the sentimentality and direction. However, it was a box-office success, grossing $202.3 million against a $50–90 million budget.

== Plot ==
In 1969, Hunter "Patch" Adams, after developing suicidal thoughts, admits himself to a mental institution. There, he finds that using humor, rather than doctor-centered psychotherapy, better helps his fellow patients and provides him with a new purpose. Because of this, he wants to become a medical doctor and leaves the facility. Two years later, he enrolls at the Medical College of Virginia as its oldest first-year student.

Adams questions the school's soulless approach to medical care, particularly why students do not work with patients until their third year, as well as the methods of the school's dean, Walcott, who takes an instant dislike to him. Adams is expelled from the medical school but is reinstated when it becomes apparent that his eccentric methods often improve his patients' physical and mental health.

He begins a friendship with fellow student Carin Fisher and develops his idea for a medical clinic built around his philosophy of treating patients using humor and compassion. With the help of Arthur Mendelson, a wealthy man who was a patient with Adams while in the mental hospital, he purchases 105 acres (42 hectares) in West Virginia to construct the future Gesundheit! Institute. When the clinic opens, they treat patients without medical insurance and perform comedy sketches for them.

Adams's friendship with Fisher turns into romance. When she reveals that she had been molested as a child, he reassures her that she can overcome her pain by helping others. Encouraged, Fisher wants to help a disturbed patient, Lawrence "Larry" Silver. However, Silver murders Fisher with a shotgun and then kills himself in a murder–suicide. Adams, guilt-ridden, questions the goodness in humanity. Standing on a cliff, he contemplates suicide again and asks God for an explanation. He sees a butterfly, and it reminds him that Fisher had always wished that she were a caterpillar that could turn into a butterfly and fly away. With his spirits revived, he decides to dedicate his work to her memory.

Walcott discovers that Adams has been illegally running a clinic and practicing medicine without a license and attempts to expel him again. Adams files a grievance with the state medical board and convinces them that he must treat the spirit as well as the body. The board, although still finding some of Adams's methods very eccentric and unorthodox, allows him to graduate, and he receives a standing ovation from the packed hearing room.

At graduation, Adams receives his Doctor of Medicine degree and, bowing to the professors and audience, reveals himself to be naked underneath his cap and gown.

== Cast ==
- Robin Williams as Patch Adams
- Monica Potter as Carin Fisher
- Daniel London as Truman Schiff
- Philip Seymour Hoffman as Mitch Roman
- Bob Gunton as Dean Walcott
- Irma P. Hall as Joletta
- Josef Sommer as Dr. Eaton
- Peter Coyote as Bill Davis
- Michael Jeter as Rudy
- Harve Presnell as Dean Anderson
- Richard Kiley as Dr. Titan
- Harold Gould as Arthur Mendelson
- James Greene as Bile
- Douglas Roberts as Lawrence "Larry" Silver
- Greg Sestero as Jaime

== Reception ==
=== Box office ===
Patch Adams was released on December 25, 1998, in the United States and Canada, and grossed $25.2 million in 2,712 theaters in its opening weekend, ranking number one at the box office. Upon opening, it achieved the third-highest December opening weekend, behind Titanic and Scream 2. Additionally, it went on to beat out Michael to generate the highest Christmas opening weekend. The film would maintain this record until 2000 when Cast Away took it. After its first weekend, it was number two for four weeks. The film grossed $135 million in the United States and Canada, and $67.3 million in other territories, totaling $202.3 million worldwide.

=== Critical reception ===
On the review aggregator Rotten Tomatoes, Patch Adams has an approval score of 21% based on 71 reviews, and an average rating of 4.2/10. The critical consensus reads: "Syrupy performances and directing make this dramedy all too obvious." On Metacritic, the film holds a score of 26 out of 100, based on reviews from 21 critics, indicating "generally unfavorable reviews". Audiences surveyed by CinemaScore gave the film a grade "A" on scale of A+ to F.

Janet Maslin of The New York Times criticized the film's lowbrow comedy, which did not mesh well with its "maudlin streak", and that the sentiment felt "fabricated".

Lisa Schwarzbaum of Entertainment Weekly gave the film an F, deeming it "an offensive and deeply false 'inspirational' drama", lambasting the over-simplified portrayal of the medical establishment of the time.

Robert K. Elder of the Chicago Tribune called Monica Potter "the best thing about the otherwise dopey Patch Adams".

Chicago Sun-Times film critic Roger Ebert gave the film one-and-a-half stars out of four, and wrote, "Patch Adams made me want to spray the screen with Lysol. This movie is shameless. It's not merely a tearjerker. It extracts tears individually by liposuction, without anesthesia."

=== Adams's reaction ===
The real Patch Adams has been openly critical of the film, saying that it sacrificed much of his message to make a film that would sell. He also said that out of all aspects of his life and activism, the film portrayed him merely as a funny doctor. At a Conference on World Affairs, he told film critic Roger Ebert, "I hate that movie."

During a speech in 2010 at the Mayo Clinic, Adams said that "The film promised to build our hospital. None of the profits from the film ever came to us, and so, basically 40 years into this work, we are still trying to build our hospital." Furthermore, Adams stated,

[Robin Williams] made $21 million for four months of pretending to be me, in a very simplistic version, and did not give $10 to my free hospital. Patch Adams, the person, would have, if I had Robin's money, given all $21 million to a free hospital in a country where 80 million cannot get care.

Adams later clarified that he did not hate Williams, and Williams actively supported St. Jude Children's Research Hospital for several years. After Williams's death in 2014, Adams said, "I'm enormously grateful for his wonderful performance of my early life, which has allowed the Gesundheit Institute to continue and expand our work."

== Accolades ==
Marc Shaiman's score was nominated for the Academy Award for Best Original Musical or Comedy Score. The film was also nominated for two Golden Globe Awards, for Best Motion Picture – Musical or Comedy and Best Actor – Motion Picture Musical or Comedy (Robin Williams).

== Home media ==
Patch Adams was released on VHS in 1999 and a Collector's Edition DVD on June 22, 1999. On August 16, 2016, the film was released on Blu-ray for the first time.

== Soundtrack ==
Patch Adams: Original Motion Picture Soundtrack

Soundtrack album by Various artists
- Released: December 22, 1998
- Length: 57:19
- Label: Universal
- Producer: Various

Singles from Patch Adams: Original Motion Picture Soundtrack
- 1. "Faith of the Heart" Released: 1999

The soundtrack for Patch Adams was released on December 22, 1998, on CD and cassette by Universal Records.

Tracks 10 through 18 were written and performed by Marc Shaiman.

No.	Title	Writer(s)	Artist	Length
1.	"Faith of the Heart"	Diane Warren	Rod Stewart	4:17
2.	"Let It Rain"	Eric Clapton	Eric Clapton	5:02
3.	"Only You Know and I Know"	Dave Mason	Dave Mason	4:07
4.	"Carry On"	Stephen Stills	Crosby, Stills, Nash & Young	4:26
5.	"Bell Bottom Blues"	Eric Clapton	Derek and the Dominos	5:02
6.	"Good Lovin'"	Rudy Clark; Arthur Resnick	The Rascals	2:31
7.	"The Weight"	Robbie Robertson	The Band	4:35
8.	"People Got to Be Free"	Eddie Brigati Jr.; Felix Cavaliere	The Rascals	3:01
9.	"Stand!"	Sylvester Stewart	Sly and the Family Stone	3:08
10.	"Main Title" (Score)			2:16
11.	"Look Beyond the Fingers" (Score)			1:46
12.	"Children's Ward" (Score)			2:33
13.	"Ranch Reveal" (Score)			1:28
14.	"Hello" (Score)			1:31
15.	"Speech/Children's Reprise" (Score)			2:39
16.	"Front Porch" (Score)			2:36
17.	"Butterfly/Noodle Pool" (Score)			2:57
18.	"The Ruling/Graduation" (Score)			3:24
Total length:				57:19

== See also ==
- List of films featuring diabetes
- Munna Bhai M.B.B.S., a 2003 Indian film accused of plagiarizing Patch Adams
