= Piotr Andrejew =

Polish film director and screenwriter

Piotr Andrejew (27 October 1947 – 12 June 2017) was a Polish film director and screenwriter sometimes credited as Piotr Andreyev or Piotr Andreev.

== Biography ==
Andrejew was born on 27 October 1947 in Szczecin, Poland. His films include features Theft (1976, TV), Clinch (1978), Tender Spots (Czułe Miejsca) (1981), Shadow Man (1988) with Tom Hulce, and short films Puppets (1971), Mroz is Coming (1973), The Talk (1974), Fields Master (1975), Follow the Blow (1975), Gropingly (Po Omacku) (1975), Mein Fenster (Okno) (1979), Capriccio di Amsterdam (1983), The End (1984), Sanctus (1991), and Laugh Attack (1993). He worked with cinematographer Zbigniew Rybczyński in the 1970s.

He also directed television theater productions De Beproeving Die Ik Haar Oplegde by Simon Vestdijk (1986, TV) and Protest by Václav Havel (1987, TV) and the concert film Orlando Quartet Plays Grieg (1993, TV).
