= Shower of Stars =

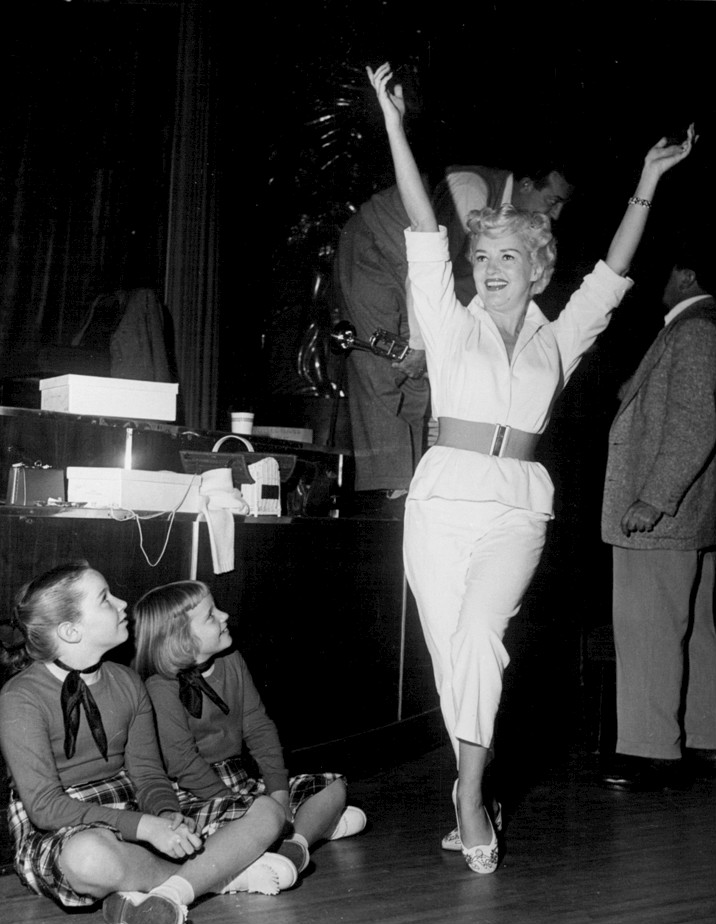
- Betty Grable rehearses for the premiere program, 1954
- Also known as: Chrysler Shower of Stars
- Genre: Variety
- Presented by: William Lundigan
- Country of origin: United States
- Original language: English
- No. of seasons: 4

Production
- Camera setup: Multi-camera
- Running time: 48 mins.
- Production company: Desilu Productions

Original release
- Network: CBS
- Release: September 30, 1954 – April 1, 1958

Shower of Stars (also known as Chrysler Shower of Stars) is an American anthology variety television series broadcast live in the United States from 1954 to 1958 by CBS. The series was broadcast in color which was a departure from the usual CBS programming practices of the 1950s.

== Overview ==
Shower of Stars is typically composed of musical comedy revues with an occasional straight play. It was shown on approximately a monthly basis during its run (1954-1958), and was designed to contrast with the heavy dramatic content of the program with which it shared its timeslot, Climax! Both programs were sponsored by Chrysler Corporation, and both were hosted by William Lundigan. The Chrysler car commercials were often on film, but a few early episodes have the cars in the studio for live broadcast.

Famous entertainers of the era who appeared multiple times on Shower of Stars included Jack Benny, Bob Crosby, Betty Grable, Van Johnson, Shirley MacLaine, Fredric March, Frankie Laine, Ethel Merman, Basil Rathbone, Red Skelton, Mario Lanza, Ed Wynn and Liberace.

March and Rathbone starred as Ebenezer Scrooge and Jacob Marley, respectively, in a 1954 filmed (not live) musical adaptation of Charles Dickens's A Christmas Carol, with songs by Bernard Herrmann and Maxwell Anderson. This was the first musical version of the story to be televised, and the first in color. Rathbone would go on to play Scrooge himself, in another TV musical adaptation of the story, the 1956 version of The Stingiest Man in Town. (Rathbone would again play Scrooge in a 1958 non-musical British half-hour television version of the story, with Fredric March as narrator.) This filmed episode was produced at Desilu Studios and re-ran at Christmas time for all four years the show was on the air, giving the cast & crew time off for the holiday.

The most frequently-appearing artist, however, was Jack Benny, who joined the show as a regular in its second season, he appeared in one role or another in a majority of the program's broadcasts until the end. In episodes he was not scheduled Jack often made joke cameo appearances saying he thought he was in that episode.

== Awards and nominations ==
Year	Result	Award	Category	Recipient	Episode
1955	Nominated	Emmy Award	Best Scoring of a Dramatic or Variety Program	Gordon Jenkins	-
1955	Nominated	Emmy Award	Best Original Music Composed for TV	Bernard Herrmann	"A Christmas Carol"
1955	Nominated	Emmy Award	Best Individual Program of the Year	-	"A Christmas Carol"
1955	Nominated	Emmy Award	Best Art Direction of a Live Show	Robert Tyler Lee	-
1955	Nominated	Emmy Award	Best Actor in a Single Performance	Fredric March	"A Christmas Carol"
1955	Won	Emmy Award	Best Art Direction of a Filmed Show	Ralph Berger & Albert M. Pyke	"A Christmas Carol"
1956	Nominated	Emmy Award	Best Variety Series	-	-

== Episode status ==
Air date / episode	TITLE	Host	Guest Star	Co- Stars	DVD	Second DVD
9/30/54. 1.1	Premier “The Lanza Story”	William Lundigan	Mario Lanza	Fred Clark / Betty Grable / Harry James	Nostalgia Merchant	VHS Amvest Video
10/28/54. 1.2	Lend An Ear	William Lundigan	Edgar Bergen	Charlie McCarthy / Mario Lanza / Sheree North	Nostalgia Merchant	Lovin’ The Classics
11/18/54. 1.3	Entertainment On Wheels	William Lundigan	Betty Grable	Harry James / Groucho Marx / Danny Thomas	Nostalgia Merchant	Lovin’ The Classics
12/23/54. 1.4	A Christmas Carol	William Lundigan	Fredric March	Basil Rathbone / Bob Sweeney / Bonnie Franklin	Passport Video	Timeless Media
1/20/55. 1.5	Show Stoppers	William Lundigan	Ethel Merman	Red Skelton / Bobby Van / Peter Lind Hayes		
2/17/55. 1.6	That’s Life	Anna Maria Alberghetti	Shirley MacLaine	Johnny Ray / Larry Storch / Paul Sand	Nostalgia Merchant	Lovin’ The Classics
3/17/55. 1.7	Burlesque	Jack Benny	Joan Blondell	Dan Dailey / James Gleason / Jack Oakie		
4/14/55. 1.8	Ethel’s Show Stoppers	William Lundigan	Ethel Merman	Peter Lind Hayes / Mary Healy / Red Skelton		
5/12/55. 1.9	High Pitch	William Lundigan	William Frawley	Vivian Vance / Tony Martin / Jack Albertson	Nostalgia Merchant	Lovin’ The Classics
6/9/55. 1.10	All-Star Line-up	William Lundigan	Edgar Bergen	Charlie McCarthy / Shirley MacLaine / Ethel Merman		
10/6/55. 2.1	Time Out For Ginger	Jack Benny	Edward Everett Horton	Mary Wicks / Larry Keating / Ronnie Burns	Nostalgia Merchant	Lovin’ The Classics
11/3/55. 2.2	The Auto Show	William Lundigan	Jack Benny	Gracie Allen / Joe Besser / Gary Crosby		
12/15/55. 2.3	Gold Records	Red Skelton	Jack Benny	Rochester / Andrews Sisters / Frankie Laine	Lovin’ The Classics	
1/19/56. 2.4	The Life of Jack Benny	William Lundigan	Jack Benny	George Burns / Shirley MacLaine / Quentin Reynolds		
2/16/56. 2.5	More Gold Records	Red Skelton	Jack Benny	Rochester / Andrews Sisters / Frankie Laine	Nostalgia Merchant	Lovin’ The Classics
3/15/56. 2.6	The Flattering World		Jack Benny	Elsa Lanchester / Peggy Lee / Fredric March		
4/12/56. 2.7	Bombshells	William Lundigan	Joe E. Brown	Jane Russell / Rhonda Fleming / Frankie Laine	Nostalgia Merchant	Lovin’ The Classics
5/10/56. 2.8	The Dancers	William Lundigan	Jack Benny	George Burns / Mary Costa / Bob Crosby		
10/4/57. 3.1	(Unknown show)					
11/1/56. 3.2	50s Music	William Lundigan	Jack Benny	Rory Calboun / Bob Crosby / Nanette Fabray	Lovin’ The Classics	
12/13/56. 3.3	A Christmas Carol (re-run)	William Lundigan	Fredric March	Basil Rathbone / Bob Sweeney / Bonnie Franklin	Passport Video	Timeless Media
1/10/57. 3.4	Star Time	Jack Benny	Jayne Mansfield	Vincent Price / Liberace / Bob Crosby	Lovin’ The Classics	
2/14/57. 3.5	(Unknown show)					
3/14/57. 3.6	Cloak and Dagger	William Lundigan	Jack Benny	Heddy Lamarr / Gale Storm / Jaques D’Amboise	Reel Vault & Synergy	Lovin’ The Classics
4/11/57. 3.7	Jazz Time	Jack Benny	Tallulah Bankhead	Julie London / Tommy Sands / Ed Wynn		
5/9/57. 3.8	Skits & Sketches	William Lundigan	Jack Benny	Mel Blanc / Van Johnson / Vincent Price		
10/31/57. 4.1	Comedy Time: An Eastern Western / Halloween(Live election themed car commercials with special effects superimposing the announcer live)	Jack Benny	Carol Channing	Lennon Sisters / Fred MacMurray / Vincent Price (cameo, visiting from Playhouse 90 rehearsals)	Lovin’ The Classics	
11/28/57. 4.2	(Unknown show)					
12/19/57. 4.3	A Christmas Carol (re-run)	William Lundigan	Fredric March	Basil Rathbone / Bob Sweeney / Bonnie Franklin	Passport Video	Timeless Media
1/9/58. 4.4	All Star Time	Jack Benny	George Burns	Ed Wynn / Jo Stafford / Tommy Sands		
2/13/58. 4.5	Jack Benny’s 40th Birthday	Don Wilson	Jack Benny	Mel Blanc / Dennis Day / Mary Livingston / Rochester		
3/20/58. 4.6	4.7	William Lundigan	Jack Benny	Mel Blanc / Zsa Zsa Gabor / Van Johnson		
4/17/58. 4.7	Behind the Scenes	William (Bill) Lundigan	Jack Benny	Betty Grable / Glenn Ford / Janis Paige	Lovin’ The Classics	

The extant episodes of Shower of Stars have survived only in black-and-white kinescopes of the original color broadcasts, which have been lost. The Kinescopes were created to be shown to the Armed Forces on film. The episodes carry no copyright notice and are thus in the public domain in the United States. Several Public Domain VHS & DVD companies have released episodes (see the grid above). The Internet Archive holds seven episodes in its collection.

== Bibliography ==
- Tim Brooks and Earle Marsh, The Complete Directory to Prime Time Network and Cable TV Shows 1946–Present, Ninth edition (New York: Ballantine Books, 2007) ISBN 978-0-345-49773-4
