= Dominick and Eugene =

1988 film by Robert M. Young

Dominick and Eugene Dominick & Eugene Nicky & Gino
- Theatrical release poster
- Directed by: Robert M. Young
- Screenplay by: Corey Blechman; Alvin Sargent
- Story by: Danny Porfirio
- Produced by: Mike Farrell; Marvin Minoff
- Starring: Tom Hulce; Ray Liotta; Jamie Lee Curtis
- Cinematography: Curtis Clark
- Edited by: Arthur Coburn
- Music by: Trevor Jones
- Distributed by: Orion Pictures
- Release date: March 18, 1988
- Running time: 111 minutes
- Country: United States
- Language: English
- Budget: US$5 million
- Box office: $3 million

Dominick and Eugene is a 1988 American drama film directed by Robert M. Young about twin brothers, Dominick and Eugene. Dominick has an intellectual disability due to an injury when he was young. The film stars Ray Liotta, Tom Hulce, and Jamie Lee Curtis. For his performance as Nicky, Hulce received a Golden Globe nomination for Best Actor in a Motion Picture. The film was released in some countries under the alternate title Nicky & Gino.

== Plot ==
Dominick Luciano ("Nicky", Tom Hulce) and Eugene Luciano ("Gino", Ray Liotta) are fraternal twin brothers. Nicky has a mental disability, and Gino cares for him. Nicky is a trash collector employed by Mr. Johnson. Gino is a medical student, and receives an offer to complete his education at Stanford University Medical School, but Gino fears that if he leaves, Nicky will not be able to care for himself.

One day while Nicky is collecting trash he sees Martin shove his son Mikey down a flight of stairs. Martin calls 911, but only reports that Mikey "fell". At the hospital, Martin tells Nicky that Mikey is dead, and Martin threatens to kill Nicky if he tells anybody what he saw. Nicky goes to get a gun from Mr. Johnson's truck and returns to Martin's house, where he takes Mikey's baby brother, Joey, from Martin and his wife Theresa at gunpoint. Nicky believes that he is protecting Joey from Martin, but is pursued by the Pittsburgh police, and is cornered in an empty building by a SWAT Team.

Gino, Martin, and Theresa race to the building. Gino confronts Nicky, and finds that the sight of Mikey's abuse brought up Nicky's lost memories of their father beating him. Gino breaks down, admitting that Nicky is right: In fact, Nicky protected Gino from their father, taking blows meant for him. Nicky comforts Gino, telling him that he is not like their father and that he loves him. The police confrontation de-escalates; they leave the building and give Joey back to Theresa, and Nicky tells the police that Martin killed Mikey.

Martin is arrested, Gino leaves for Stanford, and Nicky finds a new understanding of his abilities.

== Cast ==
- Tom Hulce as Dominick "Nicky" Luciano
- Ray Liotta as Eugene Luciano
- Jamie Lee Curtis as Jennifer Reston
- Todd Graff as Larry Higgins
- Bill Cobbs as Jesse Johnson
- David Strathairn as Martin Chernak
- Bingo O'Malley as Abe

== Reception ==
The film received positive reviews, holding a 78% rating on the film-review aggregator Rotten Tomatoes based on 23 reviews. The consensus summarizes:

"Thanks to strong performances and a steady directorial hand, Dominick and Eugene successfully navigates potentially tricky themes in thoughtful, compelling fashion without resorting to trite sentimentality."

In a positive review, S. Benson of The Los Angeles Times commented the film

"is drama nudged uneasily into melodrama by the events of its last quarter. What keeps it on the side of the angels are the warmth of the writing, especially in the crucial early scenes that set the boys' relationship; the depth and wonderment with which Hulce imbues Nicky, making him unworldly and sweet but never cloying, and the deep emotions tapped by Hulce and Liotta as these loving brothers."

J. Maslin of The New York Times wrote:

"As directed by Robert M. Young, Dominick and Eugene has a refreshing plainness and a welcome unwillingness to milk the story for more pathos than is warranted. It examines the brothers' growing realization that, at 26, they must become more independent of one another. But it accomplishes this by means of genuinely involving plot developments, along with a rather startling denouement. The screenplay by Alvin Sargent and Corey Blechman, from a story by Danny Porfirio, might seem more frankly manipulative were it not for the mutual love and concern conveyed by the two stars."

D. Thomson of The Washington Post wrote,

"Robert M. Young's Dominick and Eugene wraps itself up neat as a button, but until that time Young produces an absorbingly messy blue-collar, white-collar Pittsburgh melodrama."

== Awards & Nominations ==
Hulce received a Golden Globe nomination for his performance (Best Actor – Motion Picture Drama).
