= Applause (Bonnie Franklin song) =

Single by Bonnie Franklin

from the album Applause
- Released: 1970
- Composer: Charles Strouse
- Lyricist: Lee Adams

"Applause" is the title song from the 1970 Broadway musical Applause, with music by Charles Strouse and lyrics by Lee Adams, originally performed by Bonnie Franklin, who originated the role of Bonnie in the musical, and recorded as a single with orchestra and chorus conducted by Donald Pippin. The single was released with a B-side featuring the star of the production, Lauren Bacall, making her musical theatre debut, performing "Something Greater" together with Len Cariou. The single's popularity led to Franklin's being invited to perform it on the 24th Tony Awards broadcast on television, where the show gained Best Musical, Bacall Best Leading Actress in a Musical, but Bonnie Franklin missed out on the best supporting actress to Melba Moore.

== Music and lyrics ==
The composer, Strouse, called in Marvin Hamlisch to write the arrangement for the title song "Applause", which was sung during the first act of the show by Franklin as waiters danced on tables. The song was reprised at the end of the show.

The song has Franklin's character, a waitress-cum-chorus dancer named Bonnie, asking her fellow waiter-performers: "What is it that we're living for?"—then providing the answer: "Applause, Applause! / Nothing I know / brings on the glow / like sweet applause."

== Reception ==
Franklin's single was not only the most successful song from the stage production, but also the most successful of any Broadway song that season among 14 new shows. For the stage performance New York reviews, including Time magazine, Plays and Players and The Outer Circle, commented favorably both on Franklin and her performance of the song "Applause". Though some critics were puzzled at the giving of this "rousing, toe-tapping title song" to a supporting actress rather than the lead actress. Norman Lear, who later cast and directed Franklin on TV, recalled "I loved the stride, the purposeful way she moves across a stage,".

The Encyclopedia of the Musical Theatre (2001) notes that the song's success overshadowed a similarly named - and themed - song "Applause, Applause" by Burton Lane and Ira Gershwin in the film Give a Girl a Break (1953), which had been sung by Gower Champion and Debbie Reynolds. The Oxford Companion to the American Musical (2008) describes Franklin's song as "celebratory" leading of "Broadway gypsies." The influence of Bonnie Franklin's performance of the title song remained strong enough 30 years later that in a New York magazine article in 2001 men's style editor Hal Rubenstein made reference in New York restaurant review to "a future Bonnie Franklin working here who's gonna sing "Applause" atop a table."
