= Tom Hulce =

American actor and producer (born 1953)

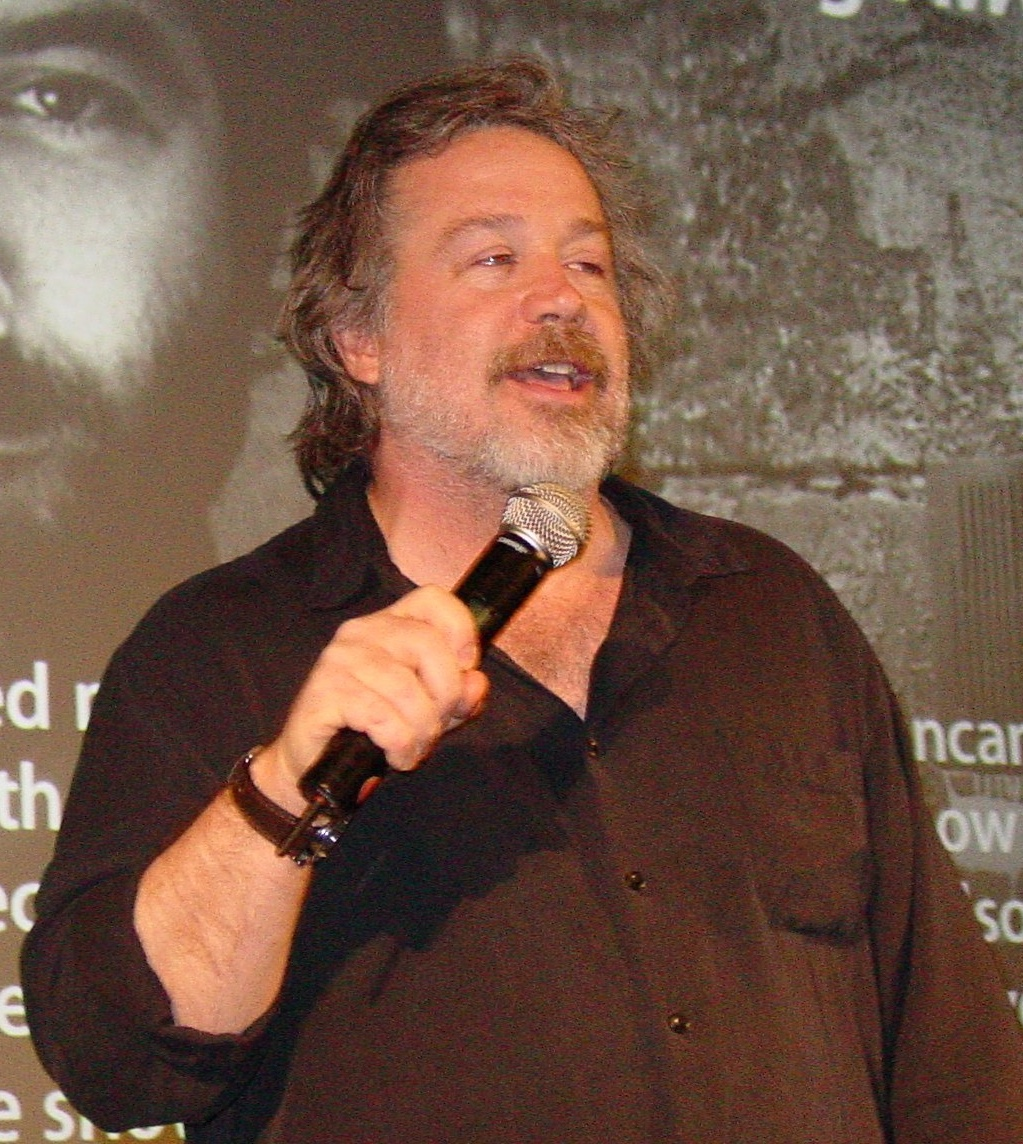
- Hulce in 2006
- Born: Thomas Edward Hulce; December 6, 1953 (age 72); Detroit, Michigan, U.S.
- Occupations: Actor; theater producer
- Years active: 1974–present

Thomas Edward Hulce (/ˈhʊls/; born December 6, 1953) is an American actor and theater producer. He is best known for his portrayal of Wolfgang Amadeus Mozart in the Academy Award-winning film Amadeus (1984), as well as the roles of Larry "Pinto" Kroger in Animal House (1978), Larry Buckman in Parenthood (1989), and Quasimodo in Disney's animated film The Hunchback of Notre Dame (1996). Hulce's awards include an Emmy Award for The Heidi Chronicles, a 2007 Tony Award for Best Musical as a lead producer for Spring Awakening, an Academy Award nomination for Best Actor for Amadeus, and four Golden Globe nominations.

== Early life ==
Hulce was born in Detroit, Michigan, and was raised in nearby Plymouth, the youngest of four children. His mother, Joanna Winkleman, sang briefly with Phil Spitalny's All-Girl Orchestra, and his father, Raymond Albert Hulce, worked for the Ford Motor Company. As a child, he wanted to be a singer, but switched to acting after his voice broke. As a teen, Hulce spent a year at the Interlochen Arts Academy before entering Beloit College. He then studied acting at the North Carolina School of the Arts, but left without a degree in 1973.

== Career ==
=== Actor ===
Hulce debuted as an actor in 1974, playing opposite Anthony Hopkins in Equus on Broadway and in Los Angeles. Throughout the rest of the 1970s and the early 1980s, he worked primarily as a theater actor, taking occasional parts in movies. His first film role was in the James Dean-influenced film September 30, 1955 in 1977. His next movie role was as freshman college student Larry "Pinto" Kroger in the classic comedy Animal House (1978). In 1983, he played a gunshot victim in the television show St. Elsewhere.

In the early 1980s, Hulce was chosen over intense competition (including David Bowie, Mikhail Baryshnikov, Mark Hamill, and Kenneth Branagh) to play the role of Mozart in Amadeus, director Miloš Forman's adaptation of Peter Shaffer's play of the same name. In 1985, Hulce was nominated for an Academy Award for Best Actor for his performance in Amadeus, losing to his co-star, F. Murray Abraham. In his acceptance speech, Abraham paid tribute to Hulce, saying, "There's only one thing missing for me tonight, and that is to have Tom Hulce standing by my side."

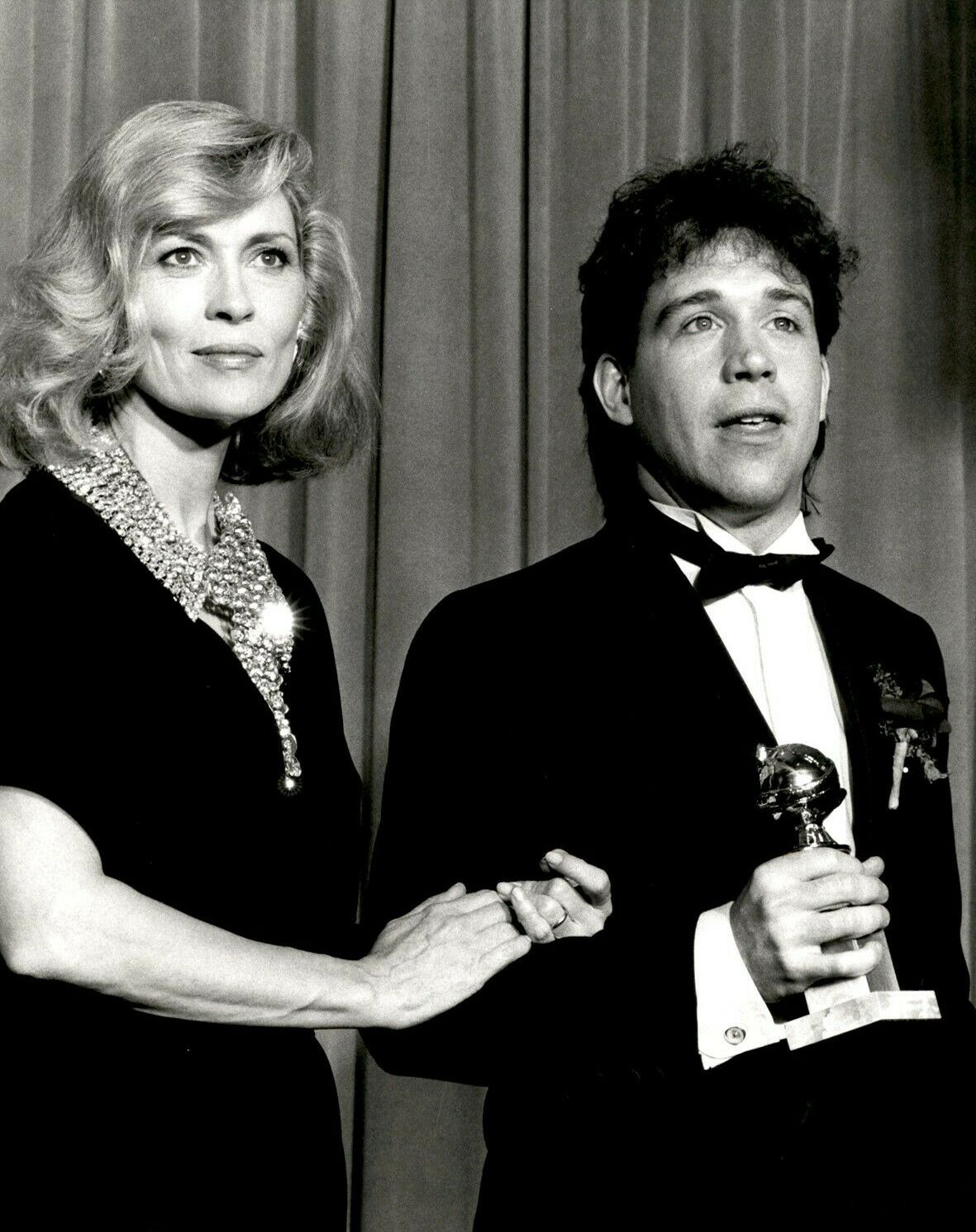
Hulce with Faye Dunaway at the 42nd Golden Globe Awards, January 1985

In 1989, Hulce received his second Best Actor Golden Globe Award nomination for a critically acclaimed performance as an intellectually-challenged garbage-collector in the 1988 movie Dominick and Eugene. He played supporting roles in Parenthood (1989), Fearless (1993) and Mary Shelley's Frankenstein (1994). In 1988, he played the title part in the British–Dutch movie Shadow Man, directed by the Polish director Piotr Andrejew.

In 1990, he was nominated for his first Emmy Award for his performance as the 1960s civil rights activist Michael Schwerner in the 1990 TV-movie Murder in Mississippi. He starred as Joseph Stalin's projectionist in Russian director Andrei Konchalovsky's 1991 film The Inner Circle. In 1996, he won an Emmy Award for his role as a pediatrician in a television-movie version of the Wendy Wasserstein play The Heidi Chronicles, starring Jamie Lee Curtis. Also that year, he was cast in Disney's animated film adaptation of The Hunchback of Notre Dame, providing the speaking and singing voice of the protagonist Quasimodo. Although Hulce largely retired from acting in the mid-1990s to focus on stage directing and producing, he had bit parts in the movies Stranger Than Fiction (2006), Jumper (2008), and in 2023 reprised the role of Quasimodo in the live-action/animated short Once Upon a Studio.

Hulce remained active in theater throughout his entire acting career. In addition to Equus, he appeared in Broadway productions of A Memory of Two Mondays and A Few Good Men, for which he was a Tony Award nominee in 1990. In the mid-1980s, he appeared in two different productions of playwright Larry Kramer's early AIDS-era drama The Normal Heart. In 1992, he starred in a Shakespeare Theatre Company production of Hamlet. His regional theatre credits include Eastern Standard at the Seattle Repertory Theatre and Nothing Sacred at the Mark Taper Forum, both in 1988.

=== Producer ===
Among Hulce's major projects are the six-hour, two-evening stage adaptation of John Irving's The Cider House Rules; and Talking Heads, a festival of Alan Bennett's one-man plays that won six Obie Awards, a Drama Desk Award, a special Outer Critics Circle Award, and a New York Drama Critics' Circle Award for Best Foreign Play. He also headed 10 Million Miles, a musical project by Keith Bunin and Grammy Award-winning singer-songwriter Patty Griffin, that premiered in Spring 2007 at the Atlantic Theater Company.

Hulce was a lead producer of the Broadway hit Spring Awakening, which won eight Tony Awards in 2007, including one for Best Musical. He is also a lead producer of the stage adaptation of the Green Day album American Idiot. The musical had its world premiere in Berkeley, California, at the Berkeley Repertory Theatre in 2009 and opened on Broadway in April 2010. In 2017 he began work as a producer on the musical Ain't Too Proud, which received 11 Tony Award nominations in 2019. He also produced the 2004 movie A Home at the End of the World, based upon Michael Cunningham's novel.

== Personal life ==
In 2008, Hulce identified as gay in an interview with Seattle Gay News, and dispelled the internet rumor that he had been married to a woman with whom he had fathered a daughter.

== Filmography ==
=== Film ===
Year	Title	Role	Notes
1977	September 30, 1955	Hanley	
1978	Animal House	Lawrence "Pinto" Kroger	
1980	Those Lips, Those Eyes	Artie Shoemaker	
1984	Amadeus	Wolfgang Amadeus Mozart	David di Donatello for Best Foreign Actor; Nominated — Academy Award for Best Actor; Nominated — Golden Globe Award for Best Actor – Motion Picture Drama
1986	Echo Park	Jonathan	
1987	Slam Dance	C.C. Drood	
1988	Dominick and Eugene	Dominick "Nicky" Luciano	Nominated — Golden Globe Award for Best Actor – Motion Picture Drama
1988	Shadow Man	David Rubenstin / The Shadow Man	
1989	Parenthood	Lawrence "Larry" Buckman	
1989	Black Rainbow	Gary Wallace	
1991	The Inner Circle	Ivan Sanshin	
1993	Fearless	Steven Brillstein	
1994	Mary Shelley's Frankenstein	Henry Clerval	
1995	Wings of Courage	Antoine de Saint-Exupéry	
1996	The Hunchback of Notre Dame	Quasimodo	Voice; Nominated — Annie Award for Best Achievement in Voice Acting
2002	The Hunchback of Notre Dame II	Quasimodo	Voice; Direct-to-DVD
2004	A Home at the End of the World	—N/a	Producer
2006	Stranger Than Fiction	Dr. Cayly	
2008	Jumper	Mr. Bowker	
2009	Kyle Riabko: The Lead	Self	Documentary
2018	The Seagull	—N/a	Producer
2022	Spring Awakening: Those You've Known	Self	Producer; Documentary
2023	Once Upon a Studio	Quasimodo	Voice; Short film

=== Television ===
Year	Title	Role	Notes
1975	Great Performances	Young Frank	Episode: "Forget-Me-Not-Lane"
1976	The American Parade	Brother	Episode: "Song of Myself"
1976	The Adams Chronicles	Student	Episode: "Chapter X: John Quincy Adams, Congressman"
1983	St. Elsewhere	John Doe No. 12 / David Stewart	3 episodes
1986	American Playhouse	Daniel Rocket	Episode: "The Rise and Rise of Daniel Rocket"
1986	Tall Tales & Legends	Quinn	Episode: "John Henry"
1990	Murder in Mississippi	Michael "Mickey" Schwerner	Television film: Nominated — Golden Globe Award for Best Actor – Miniseries or Television Film; Nominated — Primetime Emmy Award for Outstanding Lead Actor in a Miniseries or a Movie
1993	The Hidden Room	Joe	Episode: "Dreams About Water"
1995	Frasier	Keith (voice)	Episode: "She's the Boss"
1995	The Heidi Chronicles	Peter Patrone	Television film: Primetime Emmy Award for Outstanding Supporting Actor in a Limited Series or Movie; CableACE Award for Best Supporting Actor - Miniseries or Movie; Nominated — Golden Globe Award for Best Supporting Actor – Series, Miniseries or Television Film

== Theater ==
Year	Title	Role	Notes
1974	Equus	Alan Strang	
1976	A Memory of Two Mondays / 27 Wagons Full of Cotton (revival)	Bert	
1981	Twelve Dreams	Sanford Putnam	
1989	A Few Good Men	Lieutenant Junior Grade Daniel A. Kaffee	Nominated — Tony Award for Best Actor in a Play; Nominated — Helen Hayes Award for Outstanding Lead Actor, Non-Resident Play
1992	Hamlet	Hamlet	Nominated — Helen Hayes Award for Outstanding Lead Actor, Resident Play
1999	The Cider House Rules	—N/a	Director; Nominated — Drama Desk Award for Outstanding Director of a Play
2003	Talking Heads	—N/a	Producer; Nominated — Drama Desk Award for Outstanding Play
2006	Spring Awakening	—N/a	Producer; Tony Award for Best Musical; Drama Desk Award for Outstanding Musical
2010	American Idiot	—N/a	Producer; Nominated — Tony Award for Best Musical; Nominated — Drama Desk Award for Outstanding Musical
2011	On a Clear Day You Can See Forever (revival)	—N/a	Producer
2017	Significant Other	—N/a	Producer
2019	Ain't Too Proud	—N/a	Producer; Nominated — Tony Award for Best Musical
2025	Chess (revival)	—N/a	Producer
