= Applause, Applause (TV program) =

- Genre: Musical variety
- Starring: Dean Regan; Dinah Christie
- Country of origin: Canada
- Original language: English
- No. of seasons: 1
- No. of episodes: 3

Production
- Producer: Dave Robertson
- Running time: 30 minutes
- Production company: Canadian Broadcasting Corporation

Original release
- Network: CBC Television
- Release: 23 May – 6 June 1974

Applause, Applause is a Canadian musical variety show that aired on CBC Television in 1974.

== Premise ==
This was a Winnipeg-produced musical variety show featuring Dean Regan and Dinah Christie.

== Scheduling ==
The half-hour episodes aired on Thursdays at 9:30 p.m. (Eastern) from 23 May to 6 June 1974.
