= Frank McMahon (author) =

American-Irish playwright (1919–1984)

Frank McMahon (20 September 1919 – 22 December 1984) was an American-Irish playwright and broadcasting executive. His adaptation of Brendan Behan's autobiographical Borstal Boy played on Broadway after a long run in Dublin's Abbey Theatre.

== Life and career ==
McMahon was born in New York in 1919 to Irish parents, his mother from Mayo and his father from Roscommon. After graduating from Fordham University, McMahon served as an officer in the United States Navy during World War II. Following a successful career as an executive with NBC and MCA, McMahon moved to Ireland in 1961 where he worked with the newly established Raidió Teilifís Éireann (RTÉ). In the mid-sixties McMahon was commissioned by Tomás Mac Anna, Artistic Director of Dublin's Abbey Theatre, to adapt Brendan Behan's 1958 book, Borstal Boy, for the stage. The critically acclaimed production, directed by Mac Anna, was staged at the Abbey Theatre in 1967 and became the longest-running play in the history of the Abbey Theatre. Following a Broadway run of Borstal Boy in 1969, McMahon was awarded the 1970 Tony Award for Best Play.

McMahon later founded the publishing company, Four Masters, which published works including, in 1975, James Connolly, Portrait of a Rebel Father by Connolly's daughter, Nora Connolly O'Brien, and Alive, Alive-oh by John Molloy. McMahon also wrote Gandhi: The Fiery Gates for the Abbey, and James Connolly, a documentary for television. He died in 1984.
