= Borstal Boy (play) =

Play by Frank McMahon

- Original language: English
- Written by: Brendan Behan (novel); Frank McMahon (play)
- Characters: Young Behan; Charlie Millwall; Brendan Behan; Mr. Whitbread; Mrs. Gildea; Hartigan; Harty; I.R.A. Men
- Subject
- Genre: Drama, Romance
- Setting: Liverpool; Dublin, 1939

Premiere
- Date: 1967
- Place: Abbey Theatre; Dublin, Ireland

Borstal Boy is a play adapted by Frank McMahon from the 1958 autobiographical novel of Irish nationalist Brendan Behan of the same title. The play debuted in 1967 at the Abbey Theatre in Dublin, with Frank Grimes as the young Behan. McMahon won a New York Drama Critics' Circle Award in 1970 and Tony Award in 1970 for his adaptation.

== Plot synopsis ==
The title takes its name from the borstal, a British juvenile jail, at Hollesley Bay. The book was originally banned in the Republic of Ireland for obscenity.

The story is a recounting of Behan's imprisonment at Hollesley Bay for carrying explosives into the United Kingdom, with intent to cause explosions on a mission for the I.R.A. It shows the young, idealistic Behan, over the three years of his sentence, softening his radical stance and warming to the other prisoners.

== Film adaptations ==
The novel was adapted for film by Peter Sheridan and Nye Heron in 2000.

== Awards and nominations ==
=== Original Broadway production ===
Year	Award	Category	Nominee	Result
1970	Tony Award	Best Play		Won
1970	Tony Award	Best Actor in a Play	Frank Grimes	Nominated
1970	Tony Award	Best Direction of a Play	Tomas Mac Anna	Nominated
1970	Drama Desk Award	Outstanding Performance	Niall Toibin and Frank Grimes	Won
