= Applause (musical) =

1970 Broadway musical

- Original Cast Recording
- Music: Charles Strouse
- Lyrics: Lee Adams
- Book: Betty Comden and Adolph Green
- Basis: All About Eve by Joseph L. Mankiewicz; The Wisdom of Eve by Mary Orr
- Productions: 1970 Broadway; 1972 West End; 1972 Buenos Aires; 1973 U.S. television 2004 Buenos Aires Revival; 2008 Encores! 2016 Mexico City
- Awards: Tony Award for Best Musical

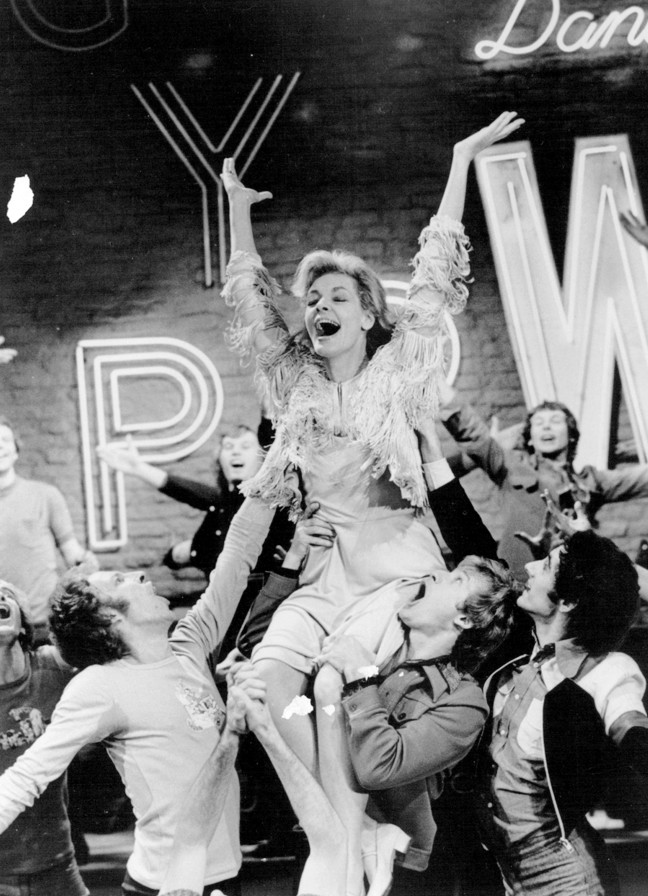
Lauren Bacall in the TV production of Applause (1973)

Applause is a musical with a book by Betty Comden and Adolph Green, lyrics by Lee Adams, and music by Charles Strouse. The musical is based on the 1950 film All About Eve and the short story on which the movie is based, Mary Orr's "The Wisdom of Eve". The story centers on aging star Margo Channing, who innocently takes a fledgling actress under her wing, unaware that the ruthless Eve is plotting to steal her career and her man.

The musical opened on Broadway on March 30, 1970, running for 896 performances. The production was nominated for ten Tony Awards and ultimately won four: the overall production won the Tony Award for Best Musical, Lauren Bacall won the Tony Award for Best Actress in a Musical, and Ron Field won both the Tony Award for Best Direction of a Musical and the Tony Award for Best Choreography.

== History ==
Composer Charles Strouse and lyricist Lee Adams (who had previously collaborated on the score to Bye Bye Birdie, among others) wanted to write a musical version of the 1950 movie, All About Eve. However, Twentieth Century Fox, which owned the rights to the movie, refused to grant them the rights to the script or the title. They were, however, able to purchase the stage rights to the short story on which All About Eve had been based, Mary Orr's "The Wisdom of Eve". The resulting musical could not contain any dialogue or characters that had been created for the movie but could use the original material that the movie also used. In April 1969, it was announced that Strouse, Adams, and book writer Sidney Michaels were beginning to work on the show, with Lawrence Kasha and Joseph Kipness producing. In July 1969, movie star Lauren Bacall was cast as aging theater star Margo Channing, the role played by Bette Davis in All About Eve. Bacall greatly identified with the role, explaining, "The Margo Channing of Applause and myself were ideally suited. She was approaching middle age. So was I. She was being forced to face the fact that her career would have to move into another phase as younger women came along to do younger parts. So was I. And she constantly felt that the man she was in love with was going to go off with someone else, someone younger of course, and I, too, had had those feelings".

Bacall, Strouse, Adams, and Kasha came to the conclusion that Michaels' book was insufficient, so Kasha hired Betty Comden and Adolph Green to write a new book. They updated the story so that it was set in the present day (1970) instead of the 1950 setting of All About Eve. Comden and Green also created new characters to replace the characters created specifically for the movie. Addison de Witt, the snide and articulate drama critic played in the film by George Sanders, was replaced by Howard Benedict, producer of the play in which Margo Channing is appearing. Margo's loyal assistant Birdie Coonan, the only character in the film who is suspicious of Eve from the start, was replaced by Duane Fox, Margo's gay hair stylist. Strouse commented that this change also made the show more relevant to the 1970s. (A memorable moment: Margo asks Duane, "Are you going to be her hairdresser too?" Duane's response: "Only when she's laid out!") At a later point, Twentieth Century Fox reversed its original decision and granted the musical's creators full rights to All About Eve's script; however, by that time, the show was so far along in its development that major changes could not be made to the book. However, Strouse and Adams did write a song based on one of the film's most famous lines, "Fasten Your Seat Belts".

== Production history ==
The Broadway production opened on March 30, 1970, at the Palace Theatre, and closed on May 27, 1972, after 896 performances and four previews. The closing date has been erroneously reported in some sources as July 27, 1972. Directed and choreographed by Ron Field with orchestrations by Philip J. Lang, the original cast included Lauren Bacall, Len Cariou, Penny Fuller, Bonnie Franklin, Lee Roy Reams, Robert Mandan, Brandon Maggart, Ann Williams, Nat Horne, and Nicholas Dante.

When Bacall's contract was up in 1971, Bacall went on tour with the show. The producers initially decided to cast film legend Rita Hayworth as a replacement for the role of Margo on Broadway. Hayworth was very interested and flew to New York to audition for the role. However, unbeknownst to anyone at the time, Hayworth was suffering from the beginning stages of Alzheimer's disease and could not retain lyrics or dialogue. Anne Baxter, who had portrayed Eve in the original film, replaced Bacall as Margo Channing. When Baxter departed the show in 1972, actress Arlene Dahl replaced her for one month before the show closed.

The musical was later adapted for television, starring Bacall, with Larry Hagman replacing Len Cariou in the role of Bill Sampson. It aired in the United States on CBS on March 15, 1973. It has not been released commercially, but it is available for viewing at the Paley Center for Media (formerly The Museum of Television & Radio) in New York City and Beverly Hills, California.

The musical opened in the West End at Her Majesty's Theatre on November 16, 1972, and ran for 382 performances. Lauren Bacall starred, along with Ken Walsh (Bill Sampson), Angela Richards (Eve Harrington), Eric Flynn (Duane Fox), Basil Hoskins (Howard Benedict), and Sarah Marshall (Karen Richards).

The Australian production with Eve Arden and Judi Connelli opened at the Metro Theatre in Kings Cross, Sydney in December 1975.

In 1980 Antonello Falqui directed the original Italian production at Teatro Nazionale in Milan and Teatro Sistina in Rome. It started Rossella Falk (Margo Channing), Ivana Monti (Eva), Gianni Bonagura (Mike), Liù Bosisio (Karen), and Gino Pernice (Duane).

New York City Center's Encores! presented a staged concert of Applause from February 7 to 10, 2008. It was directed by Kathleen Marshall and starred Christine Ebersole, Michael Park, Erin Davie, Megan Sikora, Mario Cantone, Tom Hewitt, Chip Zien, and Kate Burton.

The Library Theatre Company in Manchester produced a UK revival of the show in 1987 starring Josephine Blake, Kathryn Evans and David Dale. It was directed by Paul Kerryson.

In the fall of 1996, the musical was revised for a Broadway-bound tour that began at Paper Mill Playhouse in Millburn, New Jersey starring Stefanie Powers (Margo) and Kate Jennings Grant (Eve) under the direction of Gene Saks, and choreographed by Ann Reinking. Produced by Barry and Fran Weissler, the tour visited Tampa, Baltimore, Grand Rapids, and Columbus where the closing notice was posted on November 24, 1996.

Porchlight Music Theatre presented Applause as a part of their "Porchlight Revisits" season in which they stage three forgotten musicals per year. It was in Chicago, Illinois, in March 2016. It was directed and choreographed by Christopher Pazdernik and music directed by Nick Sula.

== Plot ==
=== Act One ===
Middle-aged actress Margo Channing presents the Tony Award to rising star Eve Harrington, who graciously thanks "my producer, my director, my writer and above all, Margo Channing". In flashback, Margo recalls the opening night for one of her plays a year-and a-half before, when Eve entered her life. Margo's admirers crowd her dressing room and fill the air with "Backstage Babble". Among the admirers is Eve, a young woman who says that she, alone and friendless in New York, has found solace in watching her hero, Margo, perform. As soon as Margo can be alone with Bill Sampson, her director and fiancé, she tries to convince him to stay with her and not go to Rome to direct a movie. Bill firmly but lovingly tells her goodbye ("Think How It's Gonna Be"). Margo dreads facing the opening night party alone, and, wanting to have a good time, she persuades Duane, her gay hairdresser, to take her and Eve to a gay nightclub in Greenwich Village ("But Alive"). The lively evening ends back at Margo's apartment. Eve declares that it has been the best time she's ever had ("The Best Night of My Life"). Margo, seeing her 19-year-old self in one of her old movies on TV, senses the impact her increasing age will have on her career and sarcastically asks, "Who's That Girl?".

Four months later, Eve has become Margo's indispensable assistant, impressing Margo's close friends, including her producer, Howard Benedict. Howard takes Eve to a "gypsy" hangout. "Gypsy," Howard explains, "is the name dancers affectionately give themselves as they go camping from show to show." The "gypsies", led by one of their own, Bonnie, celebrate "the sound that says love" – "Applause". That night, at three a.m. after a phone call from Bill in Rome, Margo longingly wishes he would "Hurry Back". Bill arranges to hurry back two weeks later, but at Margo's welcome home party for him, a misunderstanding leads to a disastrous evening ("Fasten Your Seat Belts"). Eve, as Margo's ever-present assistant, knows Margo's part in the play completely, and Eve contrives to get herself hired as Margo's understudy. Margo, feeling betrayed and threatened, faces Eve with an ironic "Welcome to the Theatre". Bill accuses her of being paranoid about Eve, and after a bitter fight, he says goodbye to Margo, ending his relationship with her. Margo is left alone on an empty stage.

=== Act Two ===
Margo is visiting her friends, playwright Buzz Richards and his wife Karen, in their Connecticut home. Karen, thinking Margo behaved unfairly to Eve, arranges for Margo to miss a performance by draining the car's gas tank so they cannot return to New York in time for the evening's performance. Stuck in the country for the night, they express their warm feelings as "Good Friends". Back in New York, Eve gives a triumphant performance in Margo's role. Howard again takes Eve to the "gypsy" hangout where she snubs Bonnie and her friends, who do a scathing parody of a girl who becomes an overnight star ("She's No Longer a Gypsy").

Margo is devastated when she reads a nasty interview that Eve has given in which she refers to "aging stars." Bill now realizes what Eve's true intentions are and rushes back full of love for Margo, telling her she's "One of a Kind". Margo, though, is too focused on her career to want to return to Bill. Eve, who has made an unsuccessful pass at Bill, ensnares the playwright, Buzz, and she rejoices that she now has a man who can help her career ("One Hallowe'en"). Her plans with Buzz are crushed by Howard who claims her for himself, telling her "We both know what you want and you know I'm the one who can get it for you" – Eve needs Howard's influence as a producer as well as his silence concerning her devious rise to stardom.

Margo seems to have lost everything because of Eve, but suddenly she realizes she could be the winner because she now has a chance at "Something Greater" – a life with Bill. In the finale, she and Bill join with everybody answering the question "why do we live this crazy life?" – "Applause".

== Principal Casts ==
Character	Broadway (1970)	Tour (1971–72)	Tour (1972–73)	London (1972–73)	Television (1973)	Tour (1996)	Encores! (2008)
Margo Channing	Lauren Bacall	Lauren Bacall	Patrice Munsel	Lauren Bacall	Lauren Bacall	Stefanie Powers	Christine Ebersole
Bill Sampson	Len Cariou	Don Chastain	Virgil Curry	Eric Flynn	Larry Hagman	John Dossett	Michael Park
Eve Harrington	Penny Fuller	Virginia Sandifur	Diane McAfee	Angela Richards	Penny Fuller	Kate Jennings Grant	Erin Davie
Bonnie	Bonnie Franklin	Leland Palmer	Pia Zadora	Sheila O'Neill	Debbie Bowen	Role cut	Megan Sikora
Duane Fox	Lee Roy Reams	Lee Roy Reams	Bryan Spencer	Ken Walsh	Harvey Evans	Darrell Carey	Mario Cantone
Howard Benedict	Robert Mandan	Norwood Smith	Ed Fuller	Basil Hoskins	Robert Mandan	Nick Wyman	Tom Hewitt
Buzz Richards	Brandon Maggart	Ted Pritchard	Stephen Everett	Rod McLennan	Rod McLennan	Stuart Zagnit	Chip Zien
Karen Richards	Ann Williams	Beverly Dixon	Lisa Carroll	Sarah Marshall	Sarah Marshall	Janet Aldrich	Kate Burton
Peter	John Anania	Burt Bier	Jay Bonnell	Ian Burford	David Knight	Jay Russell	Bob Gaynor
Bert	Tom Urich	George McDaniel	Alan Jordan	Stanley McGeagh	Rob Sherman	Bill Ullman	David Studwell
Stan Harding	Ray Becker	Ray Thorne	Brandt Edwards	Frank Coda	James Berwick	Denis Jones	Tony Freeman
Bill Sampson Singing voice					Ken Barrie		

== Song list ==
Act I

- Backstage Babble – First Nighters
- Think How It's Gonna Be – Bill Sampson
- But Alive – Margo Channing, Gay Bar Patrons
- The Best Night of My Life – Eve Harrington
- Who's That Girl? – Margo
- Applause - Bonnie, Gypsies
- Hurry Back – Margo
- Fasten Your Seat Belts – Margo, Party Guests
- Welcome to the Theatre – Margo

Act II

- Good Friends - Buzz Richards, Karen Richards, Margo
- She's No Longer a Gypsy – Bonnie, Gypsies
- One of a Kind – Bill, Margo
- One Hallowe'en – Eve
- Something Greater – Margo
- Finale – Company

== Awards and nominations ==
=== Original Broadway production ===
Year	Award	Category	Nominee	Result
1970	Tony Award	Best Musical		Won
1970	Tony Award	Best Performance by a Leading Actor in a Musical	Len Cariou	Nominated
1970	Tony Award	Best Performance by a Leading Actress in a Musical	Lauren Bacall	Won
1970	Tony Award	Best Performance by a Featured Actor in a Musical	Brandon Maggart	Nominated
1970	Tony Award	Best Performance by a Featured Actress in a Musical	Bonnie Franklin	Nominated
1970	Tony Award	Best Performance by a Featured Actress in a Musical	Penny Fuller	Nominated
1970	Tony Award	Best Direction of a Musical	Ron Field	Won
1970	Tony Award	Best Choreography	Ron Field	Won
1970	Tony Award	Best Scenic Design	Robert Randolph	Nominated
1970	Tony Award	Best Costume Design	Ray Aghayan	Nominated
1970	Tony Award	Best Lighting Design	Tharon Musser	Nominated
1970	Drama Desk Award	Outstanding Performance	Lauren Bacall	Won
1970	Drama Desk Award	Outstanding Director	Ron Field	Won
1970	Drama Desk Award	Outstanding Choreography	Ron Field	Won
1970	Theatre World Award		Len Cariou	Won
1970	Theatre World Award		Bonnie Franklin	Won
