= Berliner Kunstpreis =

German art award

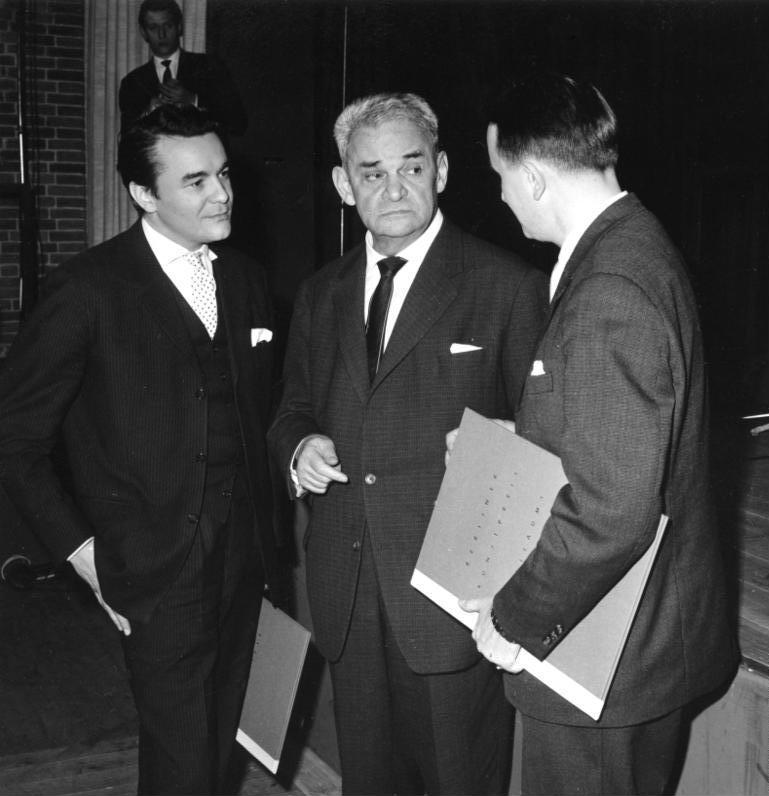
The awards ceremony of the Berliner Kunstpreis in 1963, from left to right: Klaus Kammer, Fritz Kortner, Rolf Hochhuth

The Berliner Kunstpreis (Berlin Art Prize), officially Großer Berliner Kunstpreis, is a prize for the arts by the City of Berlin. It was first awarded in 1948 in several fields of art. Since 1971, it has been awarded by the Academy of Arts (Akademie der Künste) on behalf of the Senate of Berlin. Annually one of its six sections, fine arts, architecture, music, literature, performing arts and film and media arts, gives the great prize, endowed with €15,000, whereas the other five sections annually award prizes endowed with €5,000.

== History ==
The Berlin Art Prize has been awarded since 1948 in commemoration of the March Revolution of 1848. The official name then, Berliner Kunstpreis – Jubiläumsstiftung 1848/1948 (Berlin Art Prize – 1848/1948 Jubilee Foundation), was used until 1969, the ceremony was held by the Mayor in the Charlottenburg Palace.

The prize was planned to be awarded first on 18 March 1948 by the City Berlinale, to commemorate the March Revolution and the revolutionaries who fell for a new state (für einen neuen Staat gefallenen Revolutionäre). The first prize winners of 1948, shortly before the currency reform, who received awards of 10,000 Mark, were the sculptor Renée Sintenis and the composers Ernst Pepping and Wolfgang Fortner. The then-Senator of Education awarded the prize without consulting a jury.

In 1949 a constitution was drafted. The prize (per section DM 3,000.00) should be awarded annually for achievements in literature, music, painting, graphic and performing arts. As a result, changes were made regarding the divisions, the division between several winners and the award criteria. From the mid-1950s, the ceremony was always accompanied by criticism.

Since 1971, the prize is awarded by the Academy of Arts. The Academy awards the prize annually in alternating intervals of its six sections in the order of fine arts, architecture, music, literature, performing arts and film and media arts. The Arts Award for "Film and Media Arts" award since 1984 and from 1956 to 1983, there were instead the Arts Award for "Radio-Television-Film." The prize, awarded every six years by the literature section was named in 2010 the Fontane Prize.

== Great Prize recipients ==
- 1971: Rainer Küchenmeister
- 1972: György Ligeti (Music)
- 1973: Bernhard Minetti
- 1974: Gottfried Böhm
- 1975: Josef Tal
- 1976: Wilhelm Borchert
- 1977: Joachim Schmettau
- 1980: Peter Stein (returned)
- 1981: George Tabori
- 1982: Meret Oppenheim
- 1983: Rolf Gutbrod
- 1984: Olivier Messiaen
- 1986: Marianne Hoppe
- 1987: Lina Wertmüller
- 1988: Rupprecht Geiger
- 1989: Norman Foster
- 1990: Luigi Nono
- 1992: Peter Zadek
- 1993: Otar Iosseliani
- 1994: Dieter Roth
- 1995: Renzo Piano
- 1996: Pierre Boulez
- 1998: Horst Sagert
- 1999: Kira Georgijewna Muratowa
- 2000: Anna and Bernhard Blume
- 2001: Hermann Czech
- 2002: Aribert Reimann
- 2004: Ernst Busch Academy of Dramatic Arts
- 2005: Aki Kaurismäki
- 2006: George Brecht
- 2007: Architects office SANAA (Kazuyo Sejima and Ryue Nishizawa) in Tokyo
- 2008: Helmut Lachenmann
- 2010: Thomas Langhoff
- 2011: Claire Denis
- 2012: Cristina Iglesias
- 2013: Florian Beigel
- 2014: Mathias Spahlinger
- 2015: Sherko Fatah
- 2016: Stefan Prins
- 2017: Emin Alper
- 2018: Thomas Demand
- 2019: Renée Gailhoustet
- 2020: Younghi Pagh-Paan
- 2021: Annett Gröschner
- 2022: Richard Peduzzi
- 2023: Joachim Trier
- 2024: Simone Fattal
- 2025 Gilles Clément

== Selected prize recipients ==
Recipients are typically listed in the sequence "Bildende Kunst" (art), "Baukunst" (architecture), "Musik" (music), "Darstellende Kunst" (performing art), "Film-Hörfunk-Fernsehen" (media)

- 1948: Renée Sintenis, Ernst Pepping, Wolfgang Fortner
- 1950: Bernhard Heiliger, Karl Hartung, Hans Uhlmann, Werner Heldt, Hans Jaenisch, Wolf Hoffmann, Wilhelm Deffke, Mac Zimmermann, Carl-Heinz Kliemann (art), Werner Egk, Helmut Roloff, Dietrich Fischer-Dieskau (music), Heinz Tietjen, Boleslaw Barlog (performing art)
- 1951: Louise Stomps, Mac Leube, Hans-Joachim Ihle, Theodor Werner, Alexander Camaro, Marcus Behmer, Siegmund Lympasik (art), Boris Blacher, Gerhard Puchelt (music), Hermine Körner, O. E. Hasse (performing art)
- 1952: Richard Scheibe, Lidy von Lüttwitz, Gerhart Schreiter, Karl Schmidt-Rottluff, Woty Werner, Eva Schwimmer, Gerda Rotermund, Georg Gresko (art), Arthur Rother, Helmut Krebs, Giselher Klebe (music), Mary Wigman, Frank Lothar, Kurt Meisel (performing art)
- 1953: Alexander Gonda, Emy Roeder, Johannes Schiffner, Karl Hofer, Otto Hofmann, Ernst Böhm, Dietmar Lemke, Elsa Eisgruber (art); Gerda Lammers, Karl Forster, Max Baumann (music); Käthe Dorsch, Ita Maximowna, Wolfgang Spier (performing art)
- 1954: Paul Dierkes, Ursula Förster, Otto Placzek, Max Pechstein, Curt Lahs, Hans Thiemann, Hans Orlowski, Sigmund Hahn (art), Erna Berger, Hertha Klust, Volker Wangenheim (music); Tatjana Gsovsky, Käthe Braun, Caspar Neher (performing art)
- 1955: Gerhard Marcks, Hans Purrmann, Manfred Bluth, August Wilhelm Dressler, Max Taut, Hans Scharoun, Sergiu Celibidache, Joseph Ahrens, Josef Greindl, Walter Franck
- 1956: Heinz Trökes, Hugo Häring, Philipp Jarnach, Ernst Schröder, Helmut Käutner
- 1957: Erich Heckel, Ludwig Hilberseimer, Heinz Tiessen, Joana Maria Gorvin, Heinz Rühmann
- 1958: Fritz Winter, Wassili Luckhardt, Hans Werner Henze, Martin Held, Robert Siodmak
- 1959: Elsa Wagner
- 1960: Julius Bissier, Paul Baumgarten, Wladimir Vogel, Erich Schellow, Günter Neumann, Heinz Pauck
- 1961: Rudolf Belling, Ludwig Mies van der Rohe, Karl Amadeus Hartmann, Willi Schmidt, Robert Müller
- 1962: Friedrich Ahlers-Hestermann, Egon Eiermann, Gerhart von Westerman, Gert Reinholm, Hans Rolf Strobel and Heinz Tichawsky
- 1963: Max Kaus, Sergius Ruegenberg, Paul Hindemith, Fritz Kortner, Jürgen Neven-du Mont
- 1964: Ernst Wilhelm Nay, Werner Düttmann, Hans Chemin-Petit, Rolf Henniger, Wolfgang Neuss
- 1965: Jan Bontjes van Beek, Hermann Fehling, Elisabeth Grümmer, Ernst Deutsch, Dieter Rams, Reinhold Weiss
- 1966: Hann Trier, Walter Rossow, Johann Nepomuk David, Rudolf Platte, Dieter Ertel
- 1967: Rudolf Hoflehner, Frei Otto, Karl Böhm, Gustav Rudolf Sellner, Hans Richter
- 1968: Wilhelm Wagenfeld, Erwin Gutkind, Heinz Friedrich Hartig, Hans Lietzau, Georg Stefan Troller
- 1969: Heinrich Richter, Ludwig Leo, Bernd Alois Zimmermann, Herbert Ihering, Peter Zadek

Year	Fine arts	Architecture	Music	Literature (Fontane Prize)	Performing Arts	Film – radio – television / Film and media art (from 1983)
1971	Rainer Küchenmeister	Fred Forbat				
1972			György Ligeti	Hans-Heinrich Reuter		
1973					Bernhard Minetti	Internationales Forum des Jungen Films: Ulrich Gregor, Klaus Wiese, Christian Ziewer; ARD-Filmstudio: Franz Everschor, Klaus Lackschéwitz, Heinz Ungureit
1974		Gottfried Böhm				
1975			Josef Tal	Hubert Fichte		
1976					Wilhelm Borchert	Ernst Jacobi, Peter Watkins
1977	Joachim Schmettau	Julius Posener				
1979				Alexander Kluge		
1980					Peter Stein, refused	
1981						George Tabori
1982	Meret Oppenheim					
1983		Rolf Gutbrod				
1984			Olivier Messiaen			
1985				Brigitte Kronauer		
1986					Marianne Hoppe	
1987						Lina Wertmüller
1988	Rupprecht Geiger					
1989		Norman Foster				
1990			Luigi Nono			
1991				Gerhard Meier		
1992					Peter Zadek	
1993						Otar Iosseliani
1994	Dieter Roth					
1995		Renzo Piano				
1996			Pierre Boulez			
1997				Wolfgang Hilbig		
1998					Horst Sagert	
1999						Kira Muratowa
2000	Bernhard Johannes Blume, Anna Blume					
2001		Hermann Czech				
2002			Aribert Reimann			
2003				Wilhelm Genazino		
2004					Hochschule für Schauspielkunst Ernst Busch	
2005						Aki Kaurismäki
2006	George Brecht					
2007		SANAA				
2008			Helmut Lachenmann			
2009				Emine Sevgi Özdamar		
2010					Thomas Langhoff	

Year	Fine arts	Architecture	Music	Literature	Performing Arts	Film and media art
2011	Philip Loersch	BeL Sozietät für Architektur = Anne-Julchen Bernhardt & Jörg Leeser	Alan Hilario	Nora Bossong	Moritz Grove	Maria Speth
2012	Abbas Akhavan	Tatiana Bilbao	Christoph Ogiermann	Monika Rinck	Manuel Pelmus, Kristof Van Boven	Astrid Schult, Sebastian Bäumler
2013	Birgit Dieker	SelgasCano = José Selgas, Lucía Cano	Simon Steen-Andersen	Reinhard Kaiser-Mühlecker	Ulrich Rasche	Ali Samadi Ahadi, Nadim Mishlawi
2014	Kader Attia	Group "Miasto Moje A w Nim"	Sergej Newski	Stephan Thome	Bettina Bartz	Maren Ade
2015	Marta Popivoda	Achim Menges	Marena Whitcher, Rafael Nassif	Thomas Melle	Kollektiv laborgras: Renate Graziadei, Arthur Stäldi	Andrey Zvyagintsev
2016	Sven Johne	Office KGDVS = Kersten Geers, David van Severen	Stefan Prins	Angelika Meier	Anna Prohaska	Peter Avar
2017	Axel Anklam	Francisco Mangado	Elena Mendoza	Annett Gröschner	Valery Tscheplanowa	Athina Rachel Tsangari
2018	Dominik Lejman	Philippe Block	Anna Korsun	Daniela Danz	Simon Stone	Christoph Brech
2019	Prinz & Gholam	Dorte Mandrup	Zeynep Gedizlioğlu	Uljana Wolf	Alexander Scheer	Nicolette Krebitz
2020	David Schutter	Architekturmagazin ARCH+	Christian Winther Christensen	Norbert Zähringer	Sasha Marianna Salzmann	Christine A. Maier
2021	Sajan Mani	Architekturbüro HARQUITECTES	Petra Strahovnik	Lea Schneider	Gina Haller	Susann Maria Hempel
2022	Stephanie Gudra	atelier le balto	Øyvind Torvund	Roman Ehrlich	Bastian Reiber	Bettina Blümner
2023	Petrit Halilaj	Xu Tiantian	Joanna Bailie	Barbi Marković	Marcel Kohler	Nelly Quettier
2024	Leyla Yenirce	Summacumfemmer	Cedrik Fermont / Syrphe	Carolin Callies	Lilith Stangenberg	Salomé Jashi
2025	Assaf Gruber	Anton Kolomieitsev	Cassandra Miller	Brigitta Falkner	Göksu Kunak	Pietro Marcello
