= Viotti International Music Competition =

The Viotti International Music Competition (Italian: Concorso Internazionale di Musica Viotti), named after the Italian composer and violinist Gian (Giovanni) Battista Viotti (1755–1824), is held every year in Vercelli, Piedmont. It was founded by violinist Joseph Robbone in 1950 and has been, since 1957, a member of the World Federation of International Music Competitions.

The competition is dedicated primarily to piano and opera singing, with rotating categories of voice (even numbered years), piano (odd numbered years), but also features sections for violin, chamber music, oboe, guitar, dance and composition, among others.

In the fifty years since its inception, thousands of competitors have taken part, many of whom have reached international fame. They include Luigi Alva, Claudio Abbado, Cathal Breslin, Luciano Pavarotti, Mirella Freni, Nicola Martinucci, Salvatore Accardo, Joaquín Achúcarro, Daniel Barenboim, Renato Bruson, Piero Cappuccilli, Raina Kabaivanska, Sumi Jo, Yeol Eum Son, Jeanne You, Violetta Egorova.

The judges have included Franco Corelli, Carlo Maria Giulini, Klaus Hellwig, Yehudi Menuhin, Arturo Benedetti Michelangeli, Birgit Nilsson, Carl Orff, Aureliano Pertile, Elisabeth Schwarzkopf, Renata Scotto, Joan Sutherland, and Richard Aaker Trythall, Raina Kabaivanska.

== Piano Winners ==
=== 1950s ===
==== 1950 ====
- 1: (France) Jean Micault
- 2: (Italy) Maria Teresa Garatti; (Mexico) Carlos Rivero Morales
- 3: (Italy) Licia Mancini

==== 1951 ====
- 1: (Italy) Isabella Salamon
- 2: (Poland) (Israel) [Hans] Peter Wallfisch
- 3: (Italy) Pieralberto Biondi

==== 1952 ====
- 1: (France) René Pouget
- 2: (West Germany) Walter Blankenheim
- 3: (Austria) Alexander Jenner; (Poland) Andrzej Wasowski

==== 1953 ====
- 1: (Spain) Joaquín Achúcarro; (Italy) Luciano Bertolini; (France) Gabriel Tacchino
- 2: (United States) Monte Hill Davis; (France) Eléonore Kraemer
- 3: (Italy) Adriana Brugnolini [Vecchiato]; (United States) Jack Edwin Guerry

==== 1954 ====
- 1: (Japan) Yoko Kono
- 2: (France) Cécile Ousset; (Italy) Chiaralberta Pastorelli; (West Germany) Kurt Bauer; (United States) Richard Cass
- 3: (France) Claudine Durussel; (United States) Marion Zarzeczna; (France) Bruno Fabius; Alberto Neuman (Argentina); Emanuele Perrotta (Italy)
- Grand Prix: (Argentina) (Israel) Daniel Barenboim

==== 1955 ====
- 1: (France) Cécile Ousset
- 2: (Italy) Alberto Colombo
- 3: (France) Danièle Dechenne–Decroos; (West Germany) Günter Ludwig; (Italy) Natascia Calza; (France) Pierre Delgrange; (France) Alain Barnheim
- Finalist: (Italy) Claudio Abbado

==== 1956 ====
- 1: (West Germany) Robert Alexander Bohnke
- 2: (Italy) Pier Narciso Masi; (United States) James Mathis
- 3: —

==== 1957 ====
- 1: —
- 2: (France) Claude Conard-Dargier; (United States) George Katz
- 3: (Greece) Andrée Darras

==== 1958 ====
- 1: —
- 2: (United States) Ivan Roy Davis Jr.; (France) Claude Berard
- 3: —

==== 1959 ====
- 1: —
- 2: (United States) John Perry; (France) Irène Pamboukjian; (France) Annick Savornin-Daru
- 3: (Italy) Gino Brandi; (Italy) Vittorio Del Col; (France) Pierre-Yves Le Roux; (Italy) Luisa De Robertis; (Italy) Raffaella D’Esposito

=== 1960s ===
==== 1960 ====
- 1: (Canada) Dale Bartlett
- 2: (United States) Eugenia Hymann Monacelli; (Japan) Midori Miura
- 3: (Italy) Bruno Pompili; (Poland) Jerzy Gajek

==== 1961 ====
- 1: (Argentina) Alberto Neuman
- 2: (Italy) Giorgio Sacchetti
- 3: (Spain) Antonio Rodríguez Baciero; (Italy) Luigi Galvani

==== 1962 ====
- 1: —
- 2 (Grand Prix): (Italy) Lidia Rocchetti; (France) Christian Bernard
- 2: (Bulgaria) (France) Minka Royer-Routcheva; (Italy) Giuliano Silveri; (Italy) Alessandro Specchi
- 3: —

==== 1963 ====
- 1: (Italy) Franco Angeleri; (West Germany) Gernot Kahl
- 2: (France) Paule-Françoise Bonnet; (China) Gi-In Wang – (Sweden) Dag Achatz; – (France) Ivan Darel-Kaiserman; (Italy) Marco Vavolo
- 3: —

==== 1964 ====
- 1: (United States) François-Joël Thiollier
- 2: (Spain) Rafael Orozco-Flores; (United States) Lois-Carole Pachucki
- 3: (Canada) Claude Savard

==== 1965 ====
- 1: (Spain) Joaquín Ángel Soriano Villanueva
- 2: (Japan) Yoshiya Iwamoto; (United States) Robert Spillman (US); (Uruguay) [Norma] Raquel Boldorini; (Spain) Leonora Milá i Romeu; (Argentina) (France) Suzanne Husson
- 3: (Italy) Fausto Di Cesare; (Socialist Federal Republic of Yugoslavia) Vladimir Krpan

==== 1966 ====
- 1: (Spain) Jesús González Alonso; (West Germany) Klaus Hellwig
- 2: (Italy) Ettore Peretti
- 3: (Italy) Riccardo Risaliti; (Japan) Kaori Kimura

==== 1967 ====
- 1: (France) Jacques Rouvier
- 2: (Italy) Ettore Peretti; (France) Catherine Collard
- 3: (Bulgaria) Jivko Paunov; (France) (Morocco) Marie-Cécile Milan; (Thailand) Supitra Riensuvarn
- Finalist: (Brazil) Jean-Louis Steuerman

==== 1968 ====
- 1: (Poland) Alexandra Ablewicz; (Italy) Anna Maria Cigoli
- 2: (Italy) Micaela Mingardo
- 3: (France) Danielle De Gasquet; (Chile) César Brunin Zaror; (West Germany) Franz-Friedrich Eichberger

==== 1969 ====
- 1: (Italy) Sergio Marengoni
- 2: (France) Maryvonne Le Gallo [De Saint-Pulgent]; (Chile) César Brunin Zaror
- 3: (West Germany) Herbert Seidel; (Japan) Marika Noda

=== 1970s ===
==== 1970 ====
- 1: (Austria) (West Germany) Michael Krist
- 2: (South Korea) Yong-Hi Moon; (Socialist Federal Republic of Yugoslavia) Marina Horak
- 3: (Uruguay) Carlos Cebro; (Japan) Takejiro Hirai

==== 1971 ====
- 1: (Italy) Vincenzo Balzani; (Japan) Hiroshi Tajika
- 2: (Italy) Noemi Gobbi; (Japan) Yaeko Sasaki; (Bulgaria) Vera Drencova
- 3: —

==== 1972 ====
- 1: (West Germany) Dirk Joeres
- 2: (France) Olivier Gardon; (Socialist Federal Republic of Yugoslavia) Bianca Bodalia
- 3: (Austria) Claus-Christian Schuster; (Egypt) Ramzi Yassa – (Japan) Taeko Kojima

==== 1973 ====
- 1: —
- 2: (France) Pascal Devoyon; – (Hungary) Csilla Schulter; (United States) Marioara Trifan
- 3: (Italy) Emanuela Bellio; (Hong Kong) Nancy Loo

==== 1974 ====
- 1: —
- 2: (France) Anne Perchat; (France) Pierre Laurent Aimard
- 3: (Austria) Johannes Kropfitsch; (Japan) Harumi Hanafusa

==== 1975 ====
- 1: (West Germany) Arnulf Von Arnim; (Brazil) Edson Lopes Elias
- 2: (United States) Boris Bloch; (United States) Richard Fields; (Cyprus) Elena Mouzalas
- 3: (France) Jacques Gauthier; (Japan) Tomoko Mizuno [Harada]; (Australia) Diana K. Weekes

==== 1976 ====
- 1: (Soviet Union) Karina Oganjan
- 2: (Soviet Union) Alexandre Malkus
- 3: (West Germany) Wolfram Lorenz; (Soviet Union) Svetlana Potanina

==== 1977 ====
- 1: (France) Erik Berchot; (Poland) Ewa Pobłocka
- 2: (Italy) Massimo Gon; Anne Robert [-Cambresy]
- 3: (Soviet Union) Elvina Zeynalova

==== 1978 ====
- 1: (Soviet Union) Pavel Gililov; (Canada) Angela Hewitt
- 2: (Italy) Giovanni Umberto Battel; Yovcho Margaritov Krushev (Bulgaria); (France) Jean-Yves Thibaudet
- 3:

==== 1979 ====
- 1: —
- 2: (Israel) (United Kingdom) Liora Ziv-Li; (France) Alain Jacquon
- 3: —

=== 1980s ===
==== 1980 ====
- 1: (Soviet Union) Gulzhamilija Kadyrbekova
- 2: (Soviet Union) Vasif Hasanov; (West Germany) Claudius Tanski
- 3: (France) François Chouchan; (Japan) Atsuko Isozaki

==== 1981 ====
- 1: (West Germany) (United States) Babette Hierholzer
- 2: (Socialist Federal Republic of Yugoslavia) Rita Kinka
- 3: (Japan) Mayo Yoshimura

==== 1982 ====
- 1: —
- 2: (West Germany) Thomas Duis
- 3: (Lebanon) Anne Fawaz

==== 1983 ====
- 1: (Japan) Mari Tsuda
- 2: —
- 3: (France) Olivier Cazal; (Belgium) Marie-Noëlle Damien

==== 1984 ====
- 1: (Soviet Union) Oleg Volkov
- 2: (Soviet Union) Pavel Zarukin
- 3: —

==== 1985 ====
- 1: (South Korea) Mi-Joo Lee
- 2: (France) Véronique Pellissero; (Austria) Elisabeth Väth-Schadler
- 3: (Japan) Nobuyuki Nagaoka

==== 1986 ====
- 1: (West Germany) Eckart Heiligers
- 2: (Czechoslovakia) (Iceland) Peter Máté
- 3: (West Germany) Martin Zehn

==== 1987 ====
- 1: —
- 2: (Sweden) Mats Jansson
- 3: (South Korea) Hie-Yon Choi

==== 1988 ====
- 1: (West Germany) Ulrike Payer
- 2: (Italy) Luca Rasca
- 3: (Japan) Hisako Nagayoshi; (France) Sylviane Pintarelly [Calcagno]

==== 1989 ====
- 1: (Soviet Union) (West Germany) Igor Kamenz
- 2: (Soviet Union) Sergej Yerokhin
- 3: (Italy) Giampaolo Stuani; (Italy) Roberto Corlianò

=== 1990s ===
==== 1990 ====
- 1: —
- 2: (South Korea) Choi Kyoung-Ah (Korea); (Soviet Union) Violetta Egorova
- 3: —

==== 1991 ====
- 1: (Soviet Union) Andreij Sikhorskij
- 2: (Italy) Luca Ballerini
- 3: (Italy) Gabriele Maria Vianello; (Soviet Union) Sergeij Milchten

==== 1992 ====
- 1: Camillo Radicke (Germany)
- 2: Wojciech Kocyan (Poland)
- 3: Maria Clementi (Italy)

==== 1993 ====
- 1: (Russia) Vadim Rudenko
- 2: (Romania) Valeriu Rogacev
- 3: (Japan) Mutsuko Yamamoto

==== 1994 ====
- 1: —
- 2: (Romania) Valeriu Rogacev
- 3: (Italy) Cristiano Burato; (Italy) Francesco Cipolletta

==== 1995 ====
- 1: —
- 2: (Federal Republic of Yugoslavia) Aleksandar Serdar
- 3: (Italy) Cristiano Burato; (Japan) Etsuko Hirose

==== 1996 ====
- 1: (South Korea) Eung-Joo Chung
- 2: (Russia) (United States) Olga Pušečnikova [Olga Kern]
- 3: (Federal Republic of Yugoslavia) Tamara Stefanovich; (Japan) Seiko Ohtomo

==== 1997 ====
- 1: —
- 2: (Italy) Christian Leotta
- 3: (Germany) Julia Bartha; (Japan) Nobuhito Nakai

==== 1998 ====
- 1: —
- 2: (Italy) Paolo Wolfango Cremonte; (Japan) Noriko Ishiguro
- 3: (Japan) Miwako Takeda

==== 1999 ====
- 1: (Japan) Ayako Kimura
- 2: (Italy) Alessandra Maria Ammara
- 3: (Italy) Davide Franceschetti

=== 2000s ===
==== 2000 ====
- 1: —
- 2: (Italy) Davide Cabassi; (Germany) Jacob Leuschner
- 3: (South Korea) Dong Min Lim; (South Korea) Ji Yeoun You [Jeanne You]

==== 2001 ====
- 1: (Japan) Hisako Kawamura
- 2: (Italy) Stefania Cafaro
- 3: (Italy) Federico Gianello

==== 2002 ====
- 1: (South Korea) Yeol-Eum Son
- 2: (Russia) Ekaterina Mechetina
- 3: (Italy) Lorenzo Di Bella

==== 2003 ====
- 1: (South Korea) Hyo-Sun Lim
- 2: (Japan) Akiko Nikami
- 3: (Japan) Jun Nakao

==== 2004 ====
- 1: (Russia) Feodor Amirov
- 2: —
- 3: —

==== 2005 ====
- 1: (Japan) (Germany) Mizuka Kano [Hartmann]
- 2: (Japan) Yuko Mine [Ellinger]
- 3: (Israel) (Ukraine) (Germany) Boris Feiner

==== 2007 ====
- 1: (Croatia) Martina Filjak
- 2: (Russia) Sergej Artsibashev
- 3: (Republic of Ireland) (United States) Cathal Breslin

==== 2009 ====
- 1: —
- 2: (Serbia) Stefan Ciric
- 3: (Switzerland) Christian Chamorel

=== 2010s ===
==== 2011 ====
- 1: (Russia) Alexey Lebedev
- 2: (Ukraine) Illiya Zuyko
- 3: (Ukraine) Artem Yasynskyy

==== 2013 ====
- 1: (France) Jonathan Fournel
- 2: —
- 3: (Russia) Alexey Sychev; (Russia) Alexander Panfilov

==== 2015 ====
- 1: (Russia) Ilya Maximov
- 2: (Russia) Maxim Kinasov
- 3: (United States) Alexander Bernstein

==== 2017 ====
- 1: (Russia) Konstantin Emelyanov
- 2: (Japan) Shiori Kuwahara; (Hong Kong) (United States) Aristo Sham

==== 2019 ====
- 1: (China) Ziyu Liu
- 2: (South Korea) Hans H. Suh
- 3: (China) Yilan Zhao
