= Gerald Peregrine =

Irish cellist

- Occupation: Classical cellist
- Relatives: Frank Patterson (uncle); Geraldine O'Grady (aunt); Des Keogh (uncle); Sibéal Ní Chasaide (cousin)

Gerald Peregrine is an Irish cellist. He performs as a soloist, chamber musician and orchestral player. He is a founding member of Ensemble Avalon. His recordings with pianist Antony Ingham include Folk Tales (2019) and Folk Tales, Vol. 2 (2024), both released by Naxos. In May 2020, he created Covid Care Concerts, a programme of live music for people in residential care homes and hospital settings.

== Early life and education ==
Peregrine began violin lessons at about age three and took up the cello at five or six. His aunt, the cellist Moya O’Grady, taught him to play and the late William Pleeth tutored him during his early teens.

The tenor Frank Patterson was his uncle, and his mother, Sheila O’Grady, is a violinist. She founded the Royal Irish Academy of Music's Junior String Group in 1994.

His aunt, the violinist Geraldine O’Grady, was married to the actor Des Keogh. Peregrine has also described the singer Sibéal Ní Chasaide as his cousin.

In 1990, at age twelve, Peregrine won an under-18 prize at the Feis Ceoil. In 1991, at age 13, he was one of six young Irish musicians who took part in a masterclass with Julian Lloyd Webber at the Guinness Hop Store in Dublin. Reporting on the event, the Irish Independent noted that he had already performed on television and at the National Concert Hall.

He studied with Steven Doane as a foundation scholar at the Royal College of Music, and later studied at Indiana University on a Fulbright scholarship.

== Performing career ==
In 1996, Peregrine won the string category of RTÉ’s Musician of the Future competition. He also began appearing at the West Cork Chamber Music Festival. That year, he represented Ireland in the Eurovision Competition for Young Musicians in Lisbon. Network 2 later broadcast his performance.

In 2000, he gave a recital with pianist Patrick Zuk in the National Concert Hall’s John Field Room, with works by Bach, Mark-Anthony Turnage and Brahms. Writing in the Irish Times, Douglas Sealy described the recital as "illuminating", praising Peregrine's clarity in Bach and his attentive interpretation of Turnage.

He appeared as the National Concert Hall's 2003 début recitalist, accompanied by pianist Lance Coburn.

Martin Adams noted Peregrine's tonal colour in Prokofiev and his unaccompanied performance of Eibhlís Farrell's Stillsong. He criticised Coburn's tendency to overpower the cello and wanted stronger cello projection in the Brahms arrangement.

In 2004, Peregrine presented Beethoven's complete works for cello and piano in three lunchtime concerts at the National Concert Hall, Dublin. The following year, he presented a similar series featuring Brahms and Bach, in partnership with Coburn. He told The Irish Times that RTÉ lyric fm recorded the first concert.

Peregrine was sub-principal cellist of the RTÉ Symphony Orchestra from 2003 to 2005. He became co-principal cellist of the Wexford Festival Opera orchestra in 2006, and has also toured with Camerata Ireland under Barry Douglas.

In 2006, he formed Ensemble Avalon with violinist Ioana Petcu-Colan and pianist Michael McHale. They toured Ireland, Britain and Italy, and established a winter chamber festival in Wexford.

In 2009, Peregrine and pianist Cathal Breslin toured seven venues in Ireland with support from a Music Network performance and touring award.

Peregrine also performed with Trio Festivale, alongside flautist Sabrina Hu and pianist Cathal Breslin. Reviewing its National Concert Hall debut in 2010, Michael Dungan praised the programming and warm, balanced sound, finding the second half more expressive than the restrained opening.

Ensemble Avalon became trio-in-residence at Trinity College Dublin’s music department in January 2011, following a pilot programme. The residency linked its performances with the department's teaching of composition. During the pilot, students wrote short works after lectures by the ensemble; the musicians then performed and recorded the pieces for discussion with the students. Peregrine secured corporate sponsorship for three years, and the Hugh Lane Gallery hosted public performances.

Peregrine and pianist Fiachra Garvey were scheduled to give three concerts in the National Concert Hall's 2019 Chamber Music Series, with works by Bach and Beethoven.

Peregrine has toured the United States, East Asia and the British Isles with Trio Festivale. His performances have included appearances at Carnegie Hall, the Kennedy Center and the National Centre for the Performing Arts in Beijing. He has also performed before members of the British royal family at Kensington Palace.

He has worked as a session musician with Brian Wilson, Josh Groban, Sinéad O’Connor and Joss Stone. His freelance work has also included performances with Rod Stewart and Jamiroquai.

=== Covid Care Concerts ===
In an April 2021 article for RTÉ, Peregrine described how a garden concert for his neighbours in May 2020 led him to develop Covid Care Concerts. He wrote that Myra Hess's wartime concerts had provided an inspiration, and that Mobile Music Machine subsequently began giving concerts in care-home and hospital grounds in partnership with Creative Ireland and Blackwater Valley Opera Festival.

The programme became part of the Irish government’s Keep Well campaign in October 2020.

Creative Ireland's report for 2020 records that Mobile Music Machine, led by Peregrine, delivered 200 Covid Care Concerts outside residential care homes with the programme’s support.

In March 2022, Creative Ireland awarded Mobile Music Machine €500,000 to deliver 400 further concerts in residential care homes. In June that year, Creative Ireland reported that the programme had delivered more than 1,200 concerts in 21 counties across Ireland, involving over 100 professional musicians.

By August 2024, The Strad reported that he had performed about 2,000 concerts in healthcare settings, which had inspired some of the arrangements on Folk Tales, Vol. 2. AllMusic’s biography reports that the programme eventually presented more than 2,500 concerts.

== Recordings ==
Peregrine released his debut album, Heavenly, in 2007. It contains jazz standards arranged for cello.

Ensemble Avalon released their debut CD, containing piano trios by Bax, Bernstein and Beethoven, on the RTÉ lyric fm label in 2008. In Classical Music, Phillip Sommerich gave the recording four out of five stars and praised the dynamism and tonal colouring of the Beethoven performance.

The recording was selected for The Strad Recommends in January 2009. Reviewing it, Julian Haylock described the ensemble's account of Bax's Piano Trio in B flat major as "one of the highlights of my listening year".

In 2019, Naxos released Folk Tales: British Cello and Piano Miniatures, recorded with pianist Antony Ingham, with Peregrine also credited as executive producer. It includes works by Vaughan Williams, Elgar, Bax, Bridge, Delius and E. J. Moeran. The album reached number ten on the UK Official Specialist Classical Chart in May 2019.

David Mellor named it Classic FM’s Bargain Album of the Week in June 2019. Jeremy Dibble in Gramophone praised the duo’s interpretations and musical partnership, but missed the orchestral colours in Elgar’s Romance. Rob Barnett of MusicWeb International praised the playing and recorded sound; his reservations concerned some repertoire choices and the short playing time.

Naxos released Folk Tales, Vol. 2: British and Irish Miniatures in 2024. Ingham and violinist Lynda O’Connor joined Peregrine for the recording. Peregrine contributed arrangements and was credited as executive producer and co-editor. Some of the arrangements grew out of his performances in healthcare settings. Discussing the album in 2024, Peregrine said that Sibéal’s recording of “Mise Éire” had inspired him.

The album's close miking production drew praise from the Strad’s Janet Banks who noted its tonal warmth and described Peregrine's solos at the beginning and end of She Moved Through the Fair as "expressive as a human voice". Manheim found the repertoire more varied than the first volume and praised the lyrical folk-song arrangements. The album reached number sixteen on the Official Specialist Classical Chart in June 2024.

== Selected discography ==
- 2007 – Heavenly.
- 2008 – Ensemble Avalon: piano trios by Bax, Bernstein and Beethoven (RTÉ lyric fm).
- 2019 – Folk Tales: British Cello and Piano Miniatures (Naxos), with Antony Ingham.
- 2020 – Ériu, by Eimear Quinn; cello on "Love Endless".
- 2024 – Folk Tales, Vol. 2: British and Irish Miniatures (Naxos), with Antony Ingham and Lynda O’Connor.
