= Michael Reudenbach =

German composer (born 1956)

Michael Reudenbach (born 13 September 1956) is a German composer. He performs as an interpreter of Early and New Music.

== Life and achievements ==
Reudenbach was born in Aachen. After training as a church musician from 1976 to 1982, Reudenbach studied musical composition from 1986 with Joachim Blume in Cologne and Denis Cohen in Paris. In 1984 he took part in interpretation courses with Philippe Herreweghe. In 1990/1991 he attended composition courses with Helmut Lachenmann and Mathias Spahlinger.

He has been teaching music theory, musical analysis and hearing training at the Katholische Hochschule für Kirchenmusik St. Gregorius (1982-1999) and at the Hochschule für Musik Karlsruhe (1999-2016), musical composition at the Solitude Summer Academy in Stuttgart (2005), at the Darmstädter Ferienkurse (2006) and at the conservatories of Dresden and Stuttgart (substitute professorships between 2012 and 2015). Since the winter semester 2016 he has been Professor of Composition/Music Theory at the Frankfurt University of Music and Performing Arts.

Reudenbach received prizes and scholarships from the Akademie Schloss Solitude and the Heinrich-Strobel-Stiftung of the Südwestrundfunk among other.

== Works ==
- mirlitonnades pour petite flûte (1991)
- Choral for voice and 5 instruments (1991)
- Szenen, Standbilder for 4 instruments (1992, 1993–1995)
- duo pianism for 2 pianos (1993)
- … Zitate, Berührungen … for bass clarinet, harp, double bass, percussion and playback CD (1993, revised in 2000)
- Danach for string quintet (1994)
- Noch nicht – Nicht mehr for voices and playback-CD (1997, revised in 2014)
- Zählergesang for Ensemble (1997)
- Fond III for bass flute (also radio) violoncello and piano (1998)
- (Bruch)Stück(e) for 6 instruments (1999)
- Abdruck for 5 speakers, 41 instrumentalists and playback (2000–2001)
- kommen – Überschreibungen for 5 voices (2001)
- Schnitt & Fortsetzung for flute, harp, guitar, piano and timpani (2003)
- und aber. Music for string quartet (2004)
- Madrigal for Ensemble (2005/2006)
- Stück=Werk for 7 instruments (2006-…)
- Trio. Study for piano, violin and cello (2007)
- ahto. Music for 8 instruments (2008)
- Stratton for Ensemble (2008/2009)
- Trio 3 for basset horn, bass clarinet and piano (2009)
- Still for five instruments (2012/13)
- white radiation – LichtKlang-Abtastungen for robots, objects and 16 strings players (2013–2014) – in collaboration with Joachim Fleischer (Roboterchoreographie and Licht)
- 5 Raumetüden for voices (2015–2016)
- Fragmente ohne Titel for 2 x 3 instruments (2016)
- Hossdorfs Laboratorium – 5 Modellversuche für Ensemble in einem 360°-Konzertraum (2016–2017)

== Publications ==
- Laut und Leise (M. Reudenbach im Gespräch mit Yvonne Charl). In: Unerhört – Konkrete und visuelle Poesie. Aachen 1999, p. 129–131.
- Toccatina. Eine Erinnerung. In auf(-) und zuhören, 14 essayistische Reflexionen über die Musik und die Person Helmut Lachenmanns. Hofheim 2005, p. 55–65.
- Gedächtnisbilder. In Musik-Kulturen – Darmstädter Diskurse 2. Saarbrücken 2008, p. 167–171.
- Vom Umkehren. In KunstMusik – Schriften zur Musik als Kunst. Heft 13. Köln 2010, p. 37–45.
- Die Zukunft von der Vergangenheit befreien? Die Vergangenheit von der Zukunft befreien? Gedanken zu Mathias Spahlinger's „adieu m'amour - hommage à guillaume dufay“. In Rückspiegel - Zeitgenössisches Komponieren im Dialog mit älterer Musik. Mainz 2010, p. 26–34.
- Impuls und Korrektur – Beobachtungen zu Im Nebel IV von Leoš Janáček (together with Kerstin Lücker). In Leoš Janáček. Music Concepts Volume 7, 2nd extended edition. Munich 2015. p. 103–123.
- white radiation. LichtKlang-Abtastungen – Werkstatttext über eine Gemeinschaftsarbeit. In MusikTexte. Heft 151. Cologne 2016, p. 55–59.

== CDs ==
- szenen, standbilder. werke 1991 – 2009, edition-rz 10021-22 (2 CDs), 2013.
- Instrumentale Kammermusik: Spiel – Kritik – Parodie. Musik in Deutschland 1950–2000. Deutscher Musikrat, RCA Red Seal/Sony BMG Music 74321 73595 2, 2007.
- Darmstadt Aural Documents. Box 3 Ensembles. NEOS 11230, 2016.
