= Jeanne You =

South Korean pianist (born 1978)

- Hangul: 유지연
- RR: Yu Jiyeon
- MR: Yu Chiyŏn

Jeanne You, also You Ji-yeoun, (born August 23, 1978 in Yeosu) is a South Korean classical pianist.

== Education and professional career ==
She began studying the piano at the age of five. After attending Yewon Art School in Seoul she became a student of Laszlo Simon at the Berlin University of the Arts and continued her studies with Klaus Bäßler and Georg Sava at the Hochschule für Musik Hanns Eisler. In 2005 she graduated with the degree of "Konzertexamen". She attended masterclasses with Daniel Barenboim, Dietrich Fischer-Dieskau, Klaus Hellwig, Hans Leygraf, Menahem Pressler, and Eliso Virsaladze. She teaches piano at the Hochschule für Musik "Carl Maria von Weber" (since 2006) in Dresden and in addition since 2009 at the Berlin University of the Arts.

== Awards ==
- 1995: 2nd Prize, Göttingen International Chopin Competition
- 1997: 4th Prize, Konzerteum International Piano Competition
- 2000: 3rd Prize, 51st Viotti International Music Competition
- 2001: 3rd Prize, 8th International Johannes Brahms Competition
- 2004: 1st Prize, 2nd Berlin Pianoforte Competition
- 2004: 1st Prize, International Young Musicians Platform Bromsgrove

== Performing career ==
Jeanne You has performed widely in Germany, the UK and Korea. In 2007 she appeared in the Salle Gaveau in Paris, in 2006 at the Musica Nova Festival in Glasgow and in 2005 at the Bolzano Piano Festival. In summer 2007 she performed Fantasies and Dances of the 19th century virtuoso Charles Voss at his birthplace in Schmarsow, Mecklenburg-Vorpommern.
