= Half Moon Theatre =

Theatre company in London

Coordinates: 51.5222°N 0.0454°W

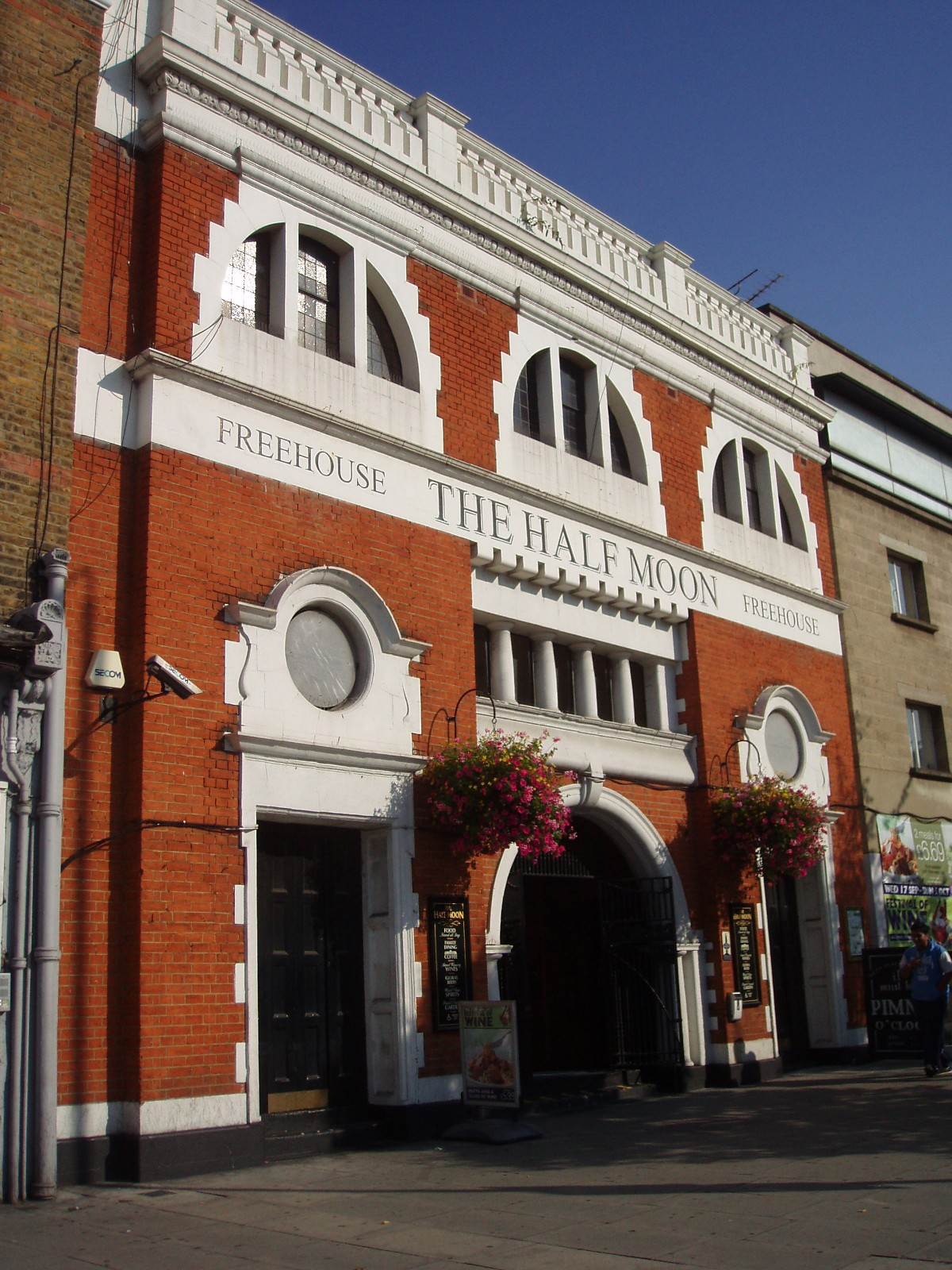
The former Half Moon Theatre, now a public house

The Half Moon Theatre Company was formed in 1972 in a rented synagogue in Alie Street, Whitechapel, in the London Borough of Tower Hamlets. Half Moon Passage was the name of a nearby alley. The founders, Michael Irving and Maurice Colbourne , and the Artistic Director, Guy Sprung, wanted to create a cheap rehearsal space with living accommodation, inspired by the sixties alternative society.

The Half Moon Young People's Theatre and Half Moon Photography Workshop and Gallery were also founded at the theatre.

== First theatre ==
The company had its first success in 1972 with Bertolt Brecht's In the Jungle of the Cities, directed by Guy Sprung, and The Shoemakers by Witkiewicz (Polish artist and playwright), directed by Maurice Colbourne.design by Eytan Levy Then in the summer of 1972, "Will Wat If Not What Will", by Steve Gooch, Guy Sprung and the Half Moon Company was a huge success. John Mortimer in the Observer calling it: "One of the best things in my term as a critic." In 1973, the company took part in the E1 festival that attracted local writers and actors. In 1975 the company set up a Management Council and began receiving an Arts Council of Great Britain subsidy. The company also formed other arts projects, a youth project that became known as the "Half Moon Young People's Theatre" and a photography collective formed by US photographer Wendy Ewald, the "Half Moon Photography Workshop" exhibiting in the theatre and from 1976 publishing Camerawork.

In 1974 an ambitious production of Henry IV, Part 1 and 2, was described by Michael Billington; "Bill Dudley has ingeniously transformed the auditorium into a medieval loft with a raked wooden platform bisecting the audience and a mini-drawbridge being lowered from a balcony for processional entrances. This means that the actors are rarely more than about fifteen feet away from the audience; and crucial speeches, like Falstaff's on Honour, can be addressed to individual spectators rather than hurled at a faceless throng".

By the late 1970s the success of the Half Moon Theatre Company meant that the original site, seating only 80 people, was far too small.

== Second theatre ==
In 1979 a disused Methodist chapel, seating 200, was identified in Mile End Road, near Stepney Green. This opened in 1979, with a production of Robert Tressell's The Ragged Trousered Philanthropists that took advantage of the dilapidated state of the building by redecorating it as a part of the performance. This theatre had fixed seating around a central performance area. In 1979 Edward Bond's The Worlds had its London première at the Half Moon.

Frances de la Tour enjoyed a collaboration with the Half Moon, appearing in the London première of Dario Fo's We Can't Pay? We Won't Pay (1978), David Zane Mairowitz's Landscape of Exile (1979), and in the title role of Hamlet (1980).

In 1980 Declan Donnellan directed the widely praised production of John Ford`s 'Tis Pity She's a Whore for Angelique Rockas New Theatre at the Half Moon Theatre.

== Third theatre ==
During 1979 it was decided that this chapel was also inadequate for the audience that the company was attracting. The Architect Bureau was commissioned to do a feasibility study on the construction of a new theatre on a site adjacent to the chapel. The main architect, Florian Beigel, designed a theatre in which there was no fixed seating, thereby allowing plays to be staged in many forms.This element was made possible by a planning gain deal brokered and funded by Central and City Properties without whom none of this would have been possible. Robert Walker, the artistic director, was very specific about the purpose and nature of the theatre. He wanted a space in which all members of a community, from primary school children to pensioners, could exhibit work, meet and visit. By the end of 1981 planning permission had been granted and in 1982 the contract was put out to tender. Construction work finally began in 1983 and by 1984 over £1m had been raised, with the participation of ACGB, Greater London Council (GLC), Inner London Education Authority (ILEA) and Tower Hamlets Council as main sponsors.

A flexible performance space was designed, with moveable seating. The former chapel was incorporated in the new building as the theatre bar, and office space. The design of the theatre was described thus:

The design is based on the most direct forms of theatre of the past, such as the Italian Commedia del Arte, and the Elizabethan theatres with galleried courtyards, such as Shakespeare’s Globe Theatre.

Chris Bond joined the company as artistic director and the theatre was handed over in December, with the opening production of Sweeney Todd in May 1985.

The Half Moon Theatre Company had put on a number of challenging international plays in the 1970s, including premières of Steven Berkoff's plays, American musicals and English premières of works by Dario Fo and Franca Rame.

== Decline ==
By the mid 1980s, the Half Moon Theatre Company was beginning to lose its popular appeal. Problems arose with both the financial management and the artistic programme. In the late 1980s the company was using all of its grant from the Greater London Arts Association to service debts from the construction. The grant was halved in 1990, as it was not being used for its intended purpose of financing performance. The theatre closed in June 1990, unable to continue.

The Conservative Government policy of the time was that arts organisations should be self-supporting through ticket sales and generate income through sponsorship and other activities. This went against the Half Moon Theatre philosophy of bringing low cost theatre to 'new' audiences. They wanted to provide political theatre to those who were on low disposable incomes, which meant keeping ticket prices down. The low income audience and strong political agenda, in turn meant that commercial sponsors were not interested in the theatre.

The Half Moon Young People's Theatre remained intact as a separate company and is still performing, with a small theatre in White Horse Road, Stepney. The Half Moon Photography workshop continued with the Camerawork gallery and darkroom space in Roman Road, Bethnal Green, and is now a part of the Four Corners film collective. After years of disuse, the theatre was converted into a JD Wetherspoon public house called The Half Moon.
