= Joachim Schmettau =

German sculptor (born 1937)

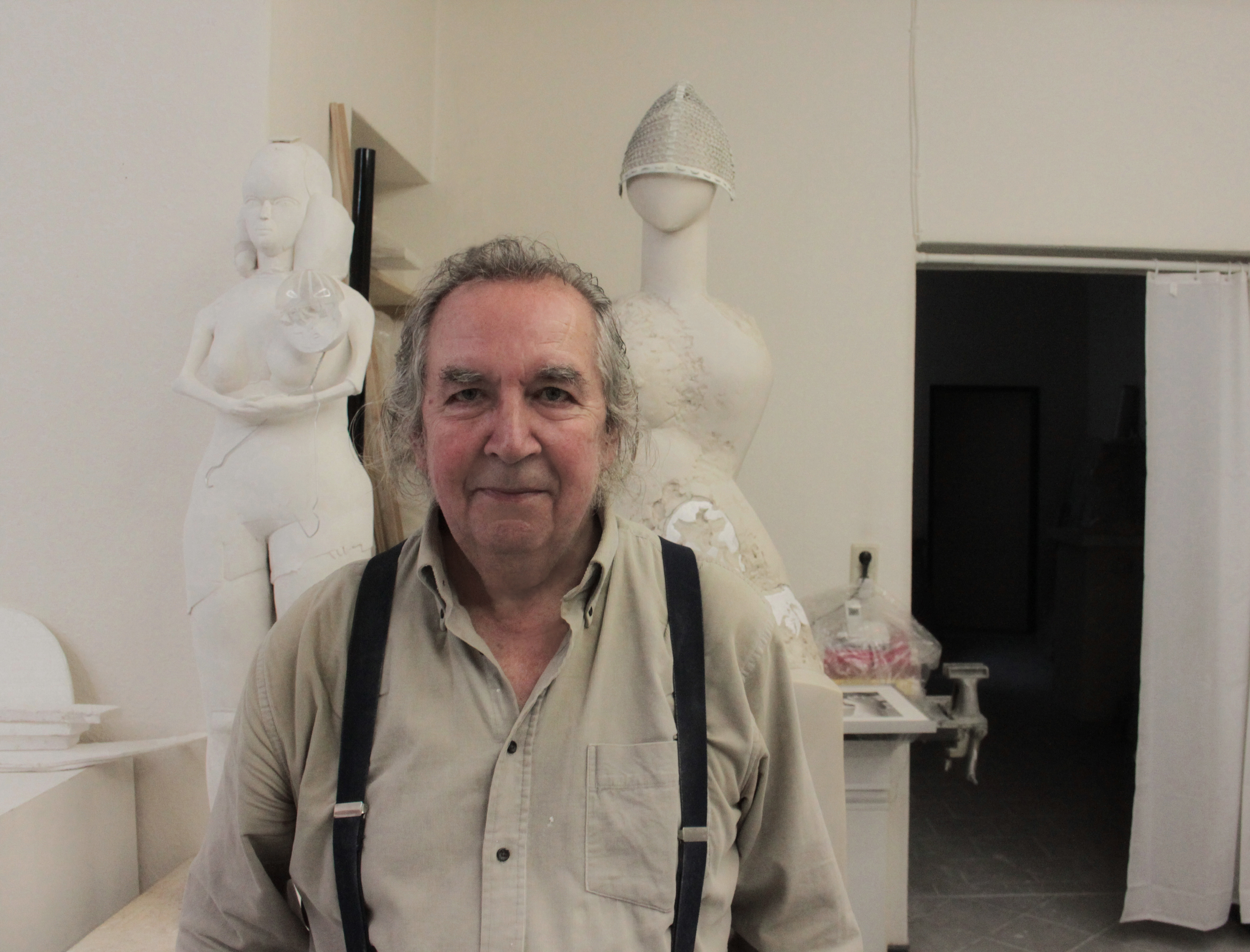
- Joachim Schmettau in 2012
- Born: 5 February 1937 (age 89); Bad Doberan, Mecklenburg, Germany
- Occupation: Sculptor

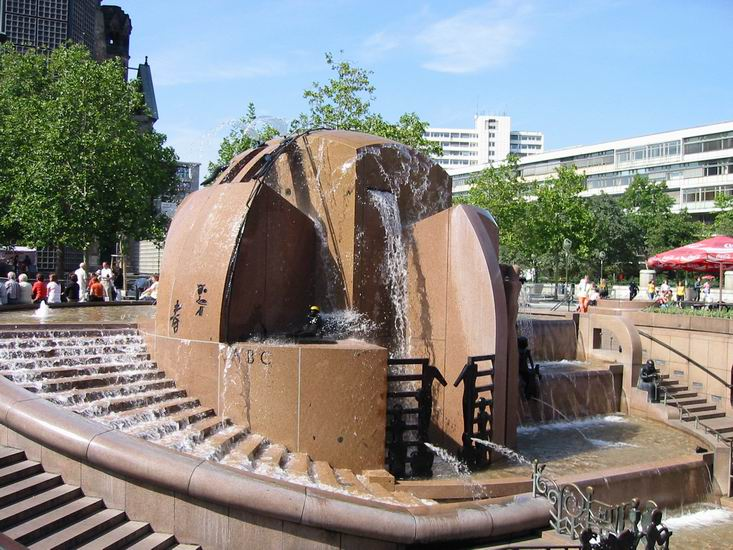
Erdkugelbrunnen (1984), Berlin-Charlottenburg, Breitscheidplatz

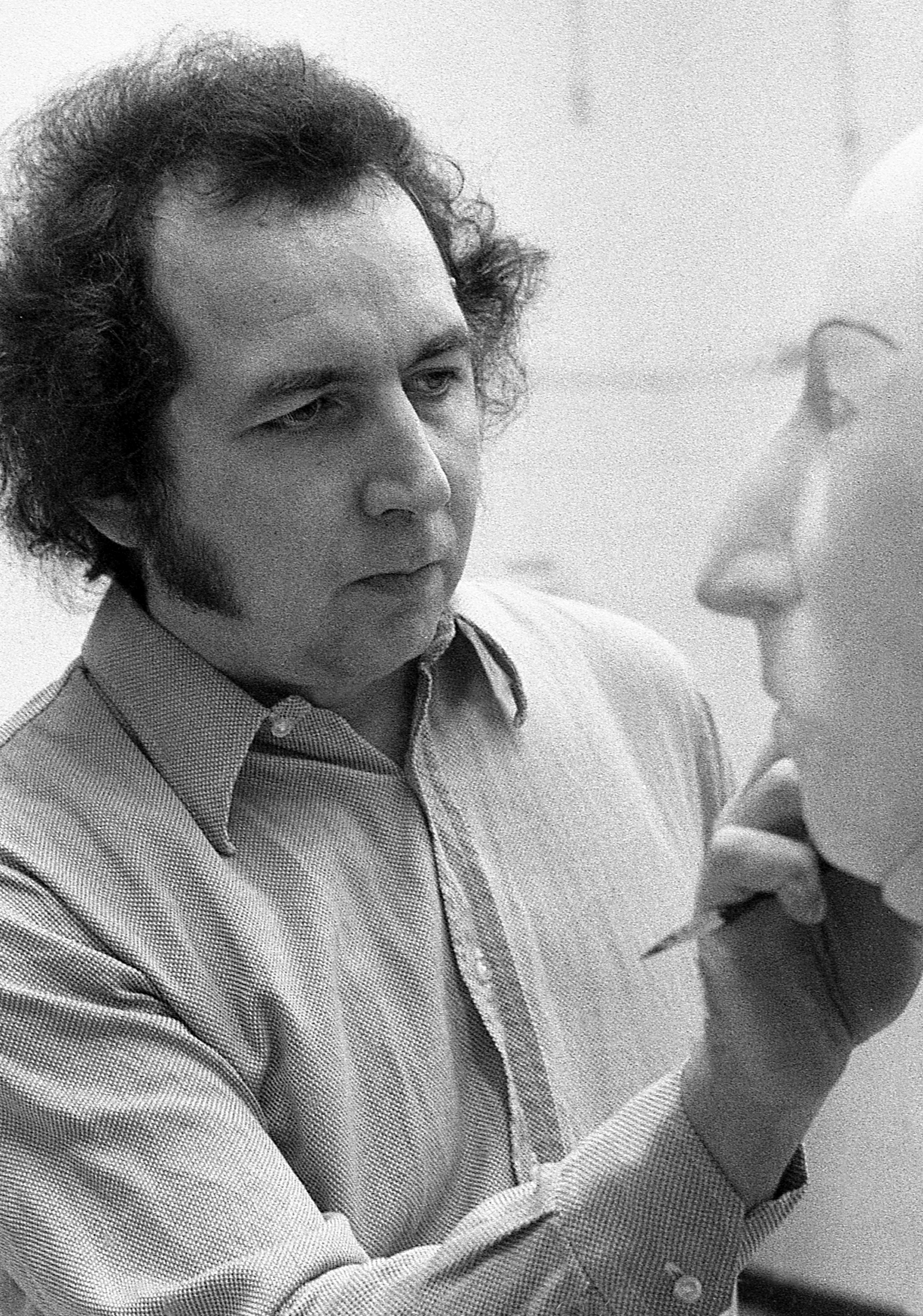
Joachim Schmettau, 1975

Joachim Schmettau (born 5 February 1937, Bad Doberan, Mecklenburg) is a German sculptor.

== Life ==
Schmettau has been living in Berlin since 1945. From 1956 to 1960, he studied at the Berlin University of the Arts, where he graduated as a student of Ludwig Gabriel Schrieber in 1961. From 1966 to 1990, he participated as a member of the Deutscher Künstlerbund at a total of 18 large annual DKB exhibitions. He was a founding member of the Gruppe Aspekt of the Berlin Critical Realists in 1972.

From 1971 to 2002, Schmettau was a professor at the Berlin University of the Arts, where Beate Schroedl-Baurmeister was one of his pupils.

== Awards ==
- 1968 Villa Romana prize, Florence
- 1970/1971 Villa Massimo Prize, Rome
- 1971 Medaglia d'oro, premio del Fiorino, Florence
- 1977 Berliner Kunstpreis
- 1980 Kunstpreis der Künstler, Düsseldorf

== Works ==
His first works were in sandstone as well as in plaster and stucco. In the 1960s, he began to combine various materials (bronze, glass) and smoothing the surface extremely. Figurative and geometrical elements were also combined, so that the work as a whole appears to have an intensified stylization.

His works for the public space (façade reliefs, fountains, and so on) is also extensive. His best-known work is the 1984 "Erdkugelbrunnen" on the Breitscheidplatz in Charlottenburg, also called the "Weltkugelbrunnen" or the "Wasserklops".

== Public projects (selection) ==
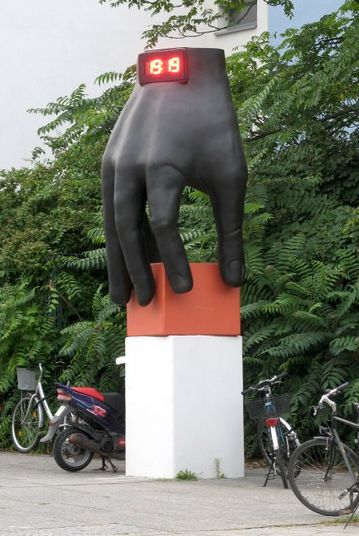
Hand mit Uhr (1975), Berlin-Hansaviertel, Altonaer Straße

- 1975 Bronze sculpture Hand mit Uhr, Berlin-Hansaviertel
- 1978 University Library Freiburg, Bridge sculptures
- 1982 Figurine group for the Deutschen Hof in Güglingen
- 1985 Tanzendes Paar, Berlin-Neukölln, Hermannplatz
- 1986 Music fountain, Düsseldorf (Grabenstraße for the Wilhelm Marx House)
- 1989 Europabrunnen (Dortmund), well installation consisting of 2 wells (Hellweg)
- 1996 Sculpture Frau, sich die Maske abnehmend for the Kreissparkasse Heilbronn
- 1998 Brunnen Tanzende Figur, Waldplatz, Leipzig
- 2010 Musikant, Löhne Music School, bronze figure for Tänzerin with Susanne Wehland

== Exhibitions (selection) ==
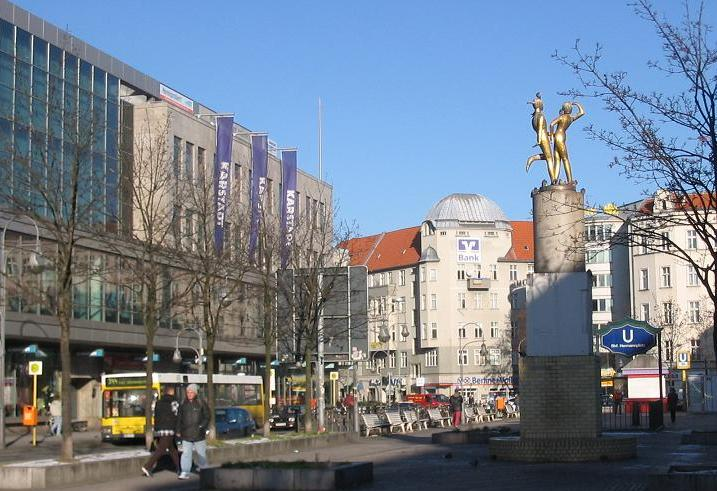
Tanzendes Paar (1985), Berlin-Neukölln, Hermannplatz

- 1970 Joachim Schmettau : Plastik und Zeichnungen, Kunsthalle Mannheim (mit Katalog)
- 1978 Joachim Schmettau. Plastiken, Zeichnungen, Studio Jaeschke, Bochum
- 1980/81 Joachim Schmettau - Skulpturen und Zeichnungen 1960 - 1980, Kunstverein Hannover; Städtische Museen Heilbronn, Deutschhof-Museum (mit Katalog)
- 1987 Joachim Schmettau, Neuer Berliner Kunstverein, Staatliche Kunsthalle Berlin (mit Katalog)
- 1993 Joachim Schmettau : Skulpturen, Bilder, Zeichnungen, Galerie Eva Poll, Berlin (mit Katalog)
- 2002/03 Neue Skulpturen, Galerie Poll, Berlin
- 2004 SOMMERLUST - KUNST-STÜCKE, Galerie Rothe, Frankfurt
- 2007 Joachim Schmettau - Skulpturen und Architekturmodelle, Galerie der Kunststiftung Poll, Berlin (ISBN 978-3-931759-21-6)

== Exhibitions at home and abroad (selection) ==
- 1963 XIII. Jahresausstellung, Neuer Darmstädter Sezession
- 1964 13. Ausstellung des Deutschen Künstlerbund, Academy of Arts, Berlin, Hochschule für bildende Künste und Haus am Waldsee (ebenfalls in 1966, 1967, 1968, 1969, 1970, 1973, 1974,1976, 1978, 1979, 1981 und 1986)
- 1965 Große Berliner Kunstausstellung, Messehallen Berlin
- 1973 Prinzip Realismus, Akademie der Künste Berlin
- 1980 Große Kunstausstellung Düsseldorf, Kunstpalast Ehrenhof, Düsseldorf (ebenfalls in 1981, 1983, 1084, und 1985)
- 1996 VIII. Biennale Internazionale di Scultura, Accademia di Belle Arti
- 2000 Auf den Punkt gebracht. Porzellane für Meissen - Max Adolf Pfeiffer zu Ehren, Leipzig Museum of Applied Arts, Leipzig
- 2005 Große Kunstausstellung NRW Düsseldorf
- 2008 L'Accademia Nazionale di San Luca per una collezione del disegno contemporaneo Accademia di San Luca
- 2010 Glückwunsch, Forum Kunst (1970-1010)!, Forum Kunst Rottweil

== Works in public collections ==
- Osthaus-Museum Hagen, Hagen
- Kunstmuseum Bonn
- Neue Nationalgalerie, Berlin
- Berlin State Museums
- Lehmbruck Museum, Duisburg
- Galleria d'Arte Moderna e Contemporanea (Bergamo)
- Bavarian State Painting Collections
- Berlinische Galerie – State Museum of Modern Art, Berlin
- Kunsthalle Mannheim
- Museum Bochum – Kunstsammlung
- Niedersächsisches Landesmuseum für Kunst und Kulturgeschichte, Oldenburg
- Beelden aan Zee, The Hague-Scheveningen
- Museum Pfalzgalerie Kaiserslautern
- Bundeskunstsammlung, Collection of Contemporary Art of the Federal Republic of Germany
- Städtische Museen Heilbronn

== Literature ==
- Lothar C. Poll (Hrsg.): Joachim Schmettau : Zeichnungen 1967-1981, ein Alphabet. (Werkübersicht aus Anlass der Ausstellung der Zeichnungen von Joachim Schmettau in der Galerie Poll im April 1982). Galerie Poll, Berlin 1982, ISBN 978-3-931759-05-6 (Poll-Editionen. Bd. 1).
- Joachim Schmettau: Skulpturen. Stock-und-Stein-Verlag, Schwerin [2000].
- Joachim Schmettau: Zeichnungen. Stock-und-Stein-Verlag, Schwerin [2000]
- Joachim Schmettau: Skulpturen 2003–2010. Nicolai-Verlag, Berlin [2011]. ISBN 978-3-89479-659-4
- Joachim Schmettau: Architekturphantasien. Nicolai-Verlag, Berlin [2015]. ISBN 978-3-89479-939-7
