= Gerhard Puchelt =

German pianist

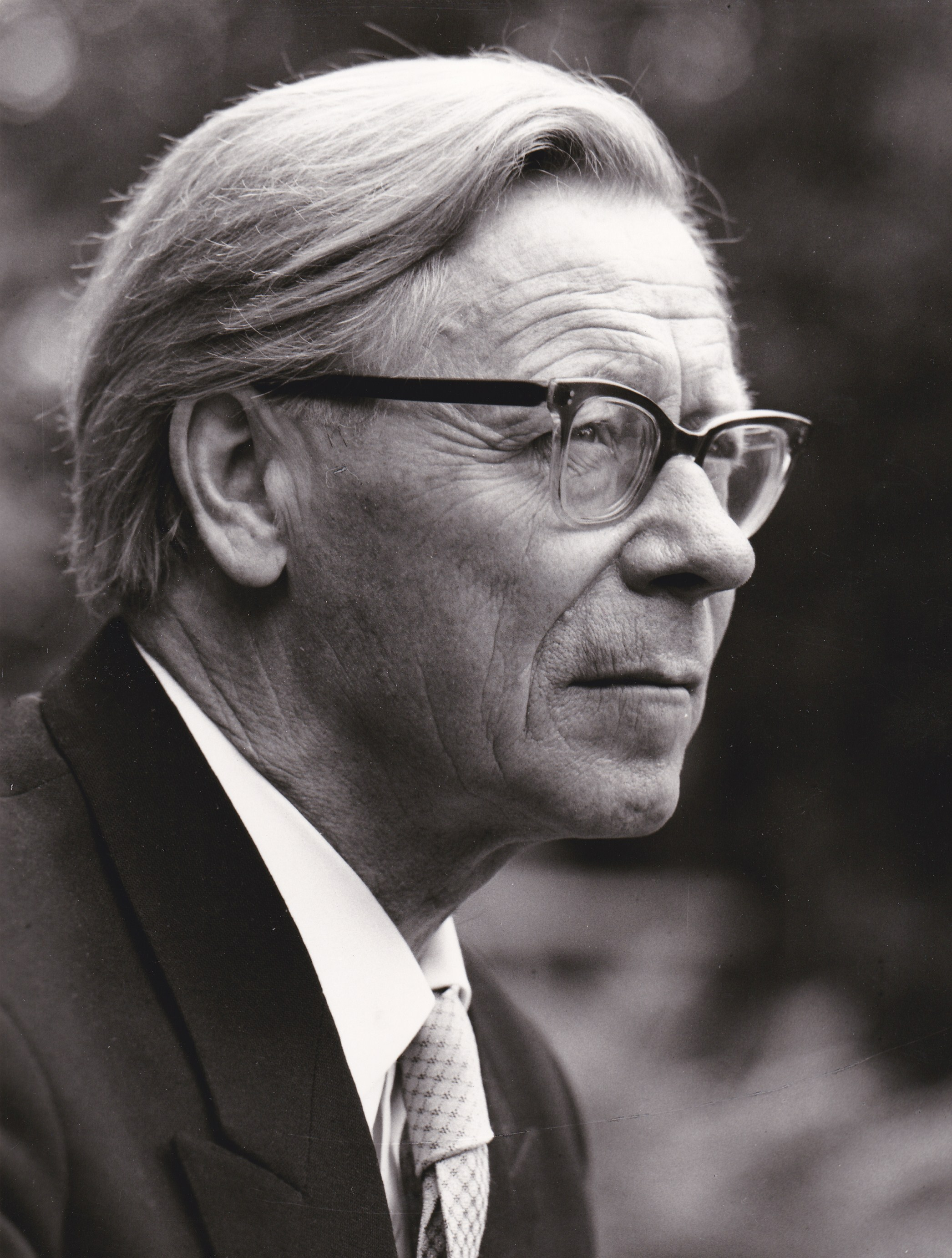
Gerhard Puchelt (1985)

Gerhard Puchelt (18 February 1913 – August 1987) was a German pianist.

== Life ==
Born in Stettin, Puchelt studied from 1931 to 1935 at the Akademie für Kirchen- und Schulmusik with Else C. Kraus and Eduard Erdmann and at the Humboldt University of Berlin. Afterwards, he worked as a concert pianist and accompanist for well-known singers, instrumentalists and chamber music ensembles. After the Second World War, he continued his career as a piano virtuoso and gave his first concert with the Berliner Philharmoniker as early as September 1945, Schumann, piano concerto op. 54. In 1949, he was appointed professor for piano at the Hochschule für Musik Berlin-Charlottenburg and remained in this position until 1978.

Puchelt performed in both parts of Germany, Western Europe, the Soviet Union - where he was the first West German pianist to be invited as early as 1956 -, South America, Japan and the USA. In 1962, when he gave five concerts in the Soviet Union, he was not allowed to take part in the concerts of the Philharmonic Orchestra in that year as planned, following a decision by the West Berlin cultural administration and the artistic director of the Berlin Philharmonic. The intention was to "counteract complaints in public".

Puchelt was a juror at numerous international piano competitions, including several times at the Robert Schumann International Competition for Pianists and Singers in Zwickau. In the 1970s, he was a member of the Broadcasting Council of the Sender Freies Berlin and deputy chairman of the programme committee there.

In the 1960s and 1970s Puchelt also toured with his daughter Christiane Edinger. He has been honoured several times for his outstanding work as a music teacher and concert pianist. He published among other things Lost Sounds: Studies on German Piano Music 1830-1880 and made a new instrumentation of the Piano Concerto No. 5 in C minor by Johann Baptist Cramer by the Robert Lienau Musikverlag.

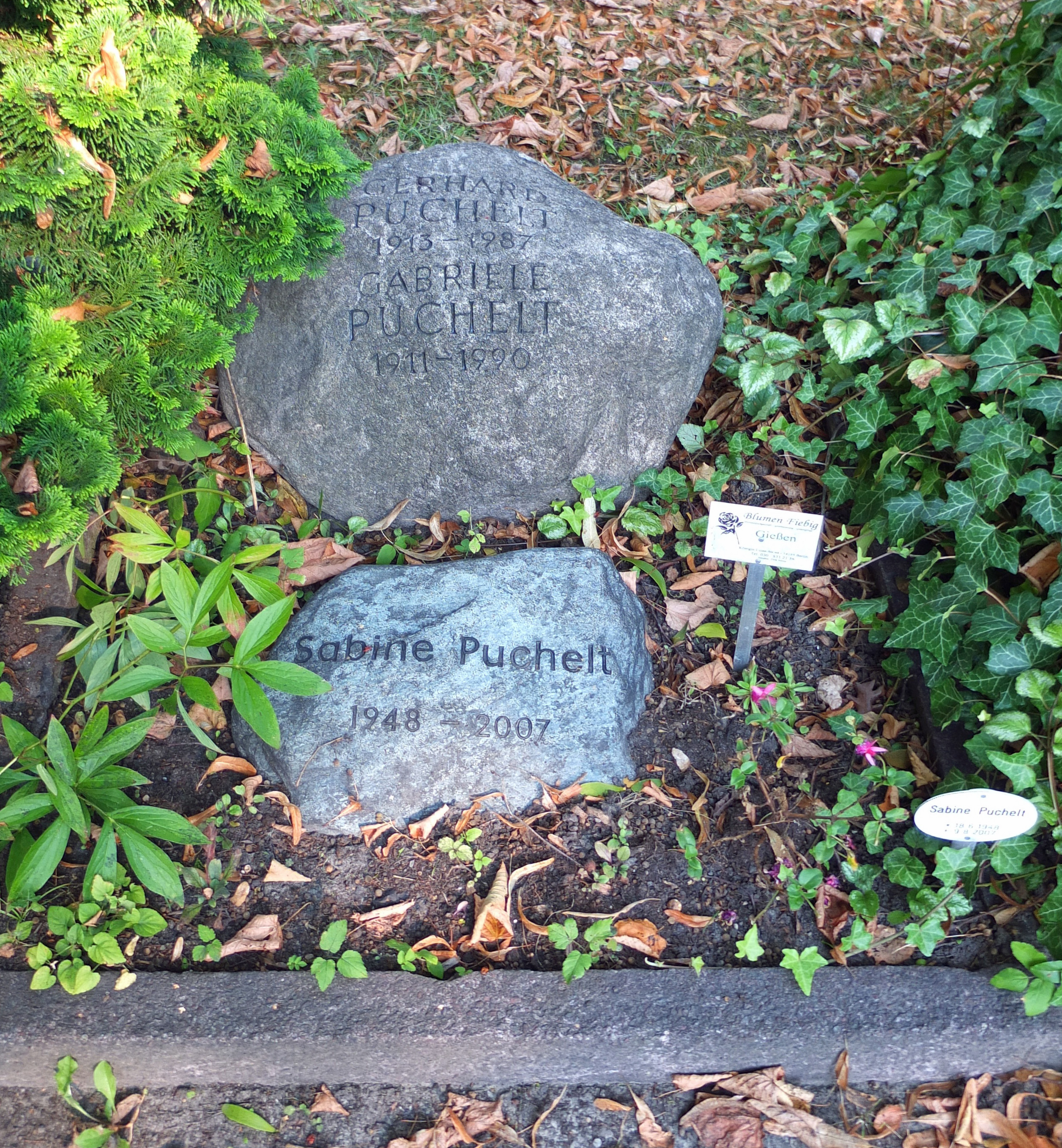
Gravesite

Puchelt is buried at the St.-Annen-Kirchhof (Berlin).

== Work ==
- Variationen für Klavier im 19. jahrhundert : Blüte und Verfall einer Kunstform.
- Verlorene Klänge. Studien zur deutschen Klaviermusik 1830-1880.

== Awards ==
- Berliner Kunstpreis (1951)
- Order of Merit of the Federal Republic of Germany 1. Class (1978).
