= Weltkugelbrunnen =

Coordinates: 52.5047°N 13.3365°E

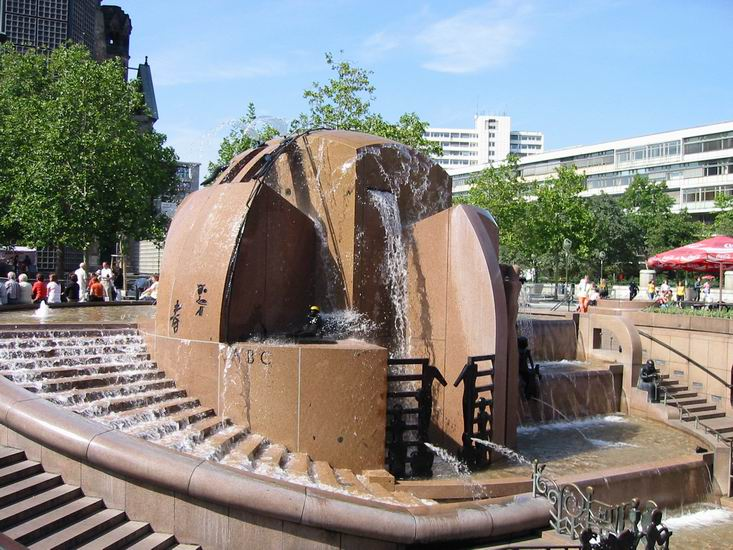
Weltkugelbrunnen

The Weltkugelbrunnen (English: World Fountain) is a water feature in front of the Europa-Center in Breitscheidplatz, Berlin.

== Design ==
The Weltkugelbrunnen was opened on the 12 August 1983. There was an open competition for the design of the fountain which was won by Berliner Joachim Schmettau. He had assistance from his colleague sculptor Susanne Wehland.

The main part consists of several carved blocks of red granite, which form an approximately hemispherical base with the diameter being 8.5 meters. It is arranged in a pool of 16 meters in diameter. In the symbolic globe characters from different cultures are depicted.

The large pool of water is surrounded by a staircase that leads from the basement of the Breitscheidplatz in the Europa-Center basement.

== Maintenance costs ==
The operation of the Weltkugelbrunnen costs the district of Charlottenburg-Wilmersdorf around 75,000 euros. Due to the district not being able to bear the costs, the Weltkugelbrunnen is dependent with help from sponsors.
