= Andrzej Wasowski =

Polish pianist

Andrzej Wasowski (January 24, 1919 – May 26, 1993) was a Polish classical pianist.

== Life ==
Andrzej Wasowski was born in Warsaw, Poland in 1919 [various sources incorrectly state 1924]. His father's family owned estates in Podolia and sugar refineries and mining interests in Silesia. His mother, Princess Maria Glińska Wąsowska was professor of piano at the Warsaw Conservatory. She, in her turn, had studied piano with Richard Baumeister, a pupil of Franz Liszt.

Andrzej began his piano studies with his mother at the age of four. In 1931 he was admitted to the Warsaw Conservatory where he studied with Margerita Trombini-Kazuro, who had studied with one of Liszt's disciples, Giovanni Sgambati. He graduated from the conservatory in 1939 with one of its highest awards, the Grand Prix d'Interpretation.

Lwów, where he was living at the time, was overrun by the Russian army in 1939. On hearing him play, they packed him off to give concerts in the Soviet Union where he performed 186 times, giving up to nine concerts in a three-day period. While in the Soviet Union, he studied with Konstantin Igumnov in Moscow.

He returned to his native city in 1942. He was permitted to give concerts to benefit war relief organisations, but was not permitted to play Polish music. Since the Nazis forbade performance of Polish music, Wasowski played clandestinely in basements for handfuls of Poles who risked their lives to hear Chopin. When he refused to play concerts for the Nazis, he was put to work in a slave battalion. He escaped Poland and settled in Vienna.

After the Second World War, all of his family's possessions were seized by the communists, and the 26-year-old Wasowski became a stateless refugee. His post-war career began in Austria (1945-1946), Italy (1946), Belgium, France, Netherlands and Great Britain (1947). Entering various piano competitions, he placed third in the 1951 Marguerite Long International Piano Competition in Paris, third ex aequo in the Viotti International Music Competition and second in the 1952 Busoni International Piano Competition in Bolzano. He toured western Europe extensively in the late 1940s and 1950s. In 1951 he played in Venezuela eventually becoming a citizen of that country. In 1956 he married Countess Maria Grocholska in Cannes. He continued to tour extensively in Europe, South and Latin America including Mexico. He returned to his native Poland for a series of concerts in 1959 and 1960.

His U.S. debut was in New York's Carnegie Hall in 1965. In the fall of 1967, he took up a teaching post at Oral Roberts University in Tulsa, Oklahoma. His letters of references included a handwritten note from Leopold Stokowski and Arthur Rubinstein.

Mr. Wasowski's family joined him from France in September 1969. During breaks from the school year he travelled back to Europe, South America and throughout the United States to perform. On January 7, 1981, Wasowski played Chopin's complete mazurkas in Lincoln Center's Alice Tully Hall. William Zakariasen of the New York Daily News in his review described it as "one of the most revelatory Chopin recitals heard in decades."

In 1983 he settled in Washington D.C. where he played at the Terrace Theater of the Kennedy Center numerous times. He died in Washington and is buried in Warsaw's Powązki Cemetery.

== Legacy ==
During the 1950's Wasowski made three recordings with the clarinetist Antoine-Pierre de Bavier for Deutsche Grammophon, including works by Johannes Brahms, Claude Debussy, Maurice Ravel, Albert Roussel and Carl Maria von Weber. In 1954, with the addition of Walter Müller on viola, a fourth record featuring works by Schumann, Weber, Debussy, Ravel, Ferruccio Busoni and Roussel was released.

Disques Alpha, a Belgian classical music label, also released two Wasowski records of Frédéric Chopin works in the 1950's.

In 1971 Wasowski recorded Chopin's 24 Preludes, Opus 28 for the Spanish RCA Red Seal label.

The U.S. based Concord Records, re-issued Wasowski's 1980 recordings of Chopin's complete mazurkas (previously issued by Finnadar Records) and his 1989 recordings of the complete nocturnes. These recordings were hailed by critics. Bernard Sherman, reviewing the mazurkas for the New York Times described Wasowski as "one of those artists the broad international public neglects but critics and colleagues rave about". Another critic, Charles Michener praised the Mazurkas as "full-blooded and intoxicating, almost shocking in their use of rubato, the freedom with which they shake the pieces' rhythmic structures".

Critical acclaim for the nocturnes (recorded in just two days, 30 September and 1 October 1989) was equally marked. The recording received the 1997 Critics Choice Award from National Public Radio, and the critic Jessica Duchen writing in BBC Music Magazine (May 1997) said "These performances of the Chopin Nocturnes, recorded in 1989, are really rather extraordinary ... a glorious singing tone of great clarity, eloquence and purity, with beautifully balanced accompaniment and inner voices ... they moved me to tears".

Wasowski's recordings show a novel approach to rhythm, especially in the mazurkas. Being familiar with the dances themselves, his readings are informed by the rhythmic conventions of Polish music, resulting in interpretations that differ markedly from the literal notation, but which are perhaps more in keeping with Chopin's own performance (see an extensive discussion in Sherman's review in the external links section).

Of his own playing, he said "In my conviction, Chopin is not a sentimentalist. On the contrary when I am at the piano I feel his power and anguished revolutionary might."

== See also ==
- List of Poles
