= Sajan Mani =

Contemporary artist

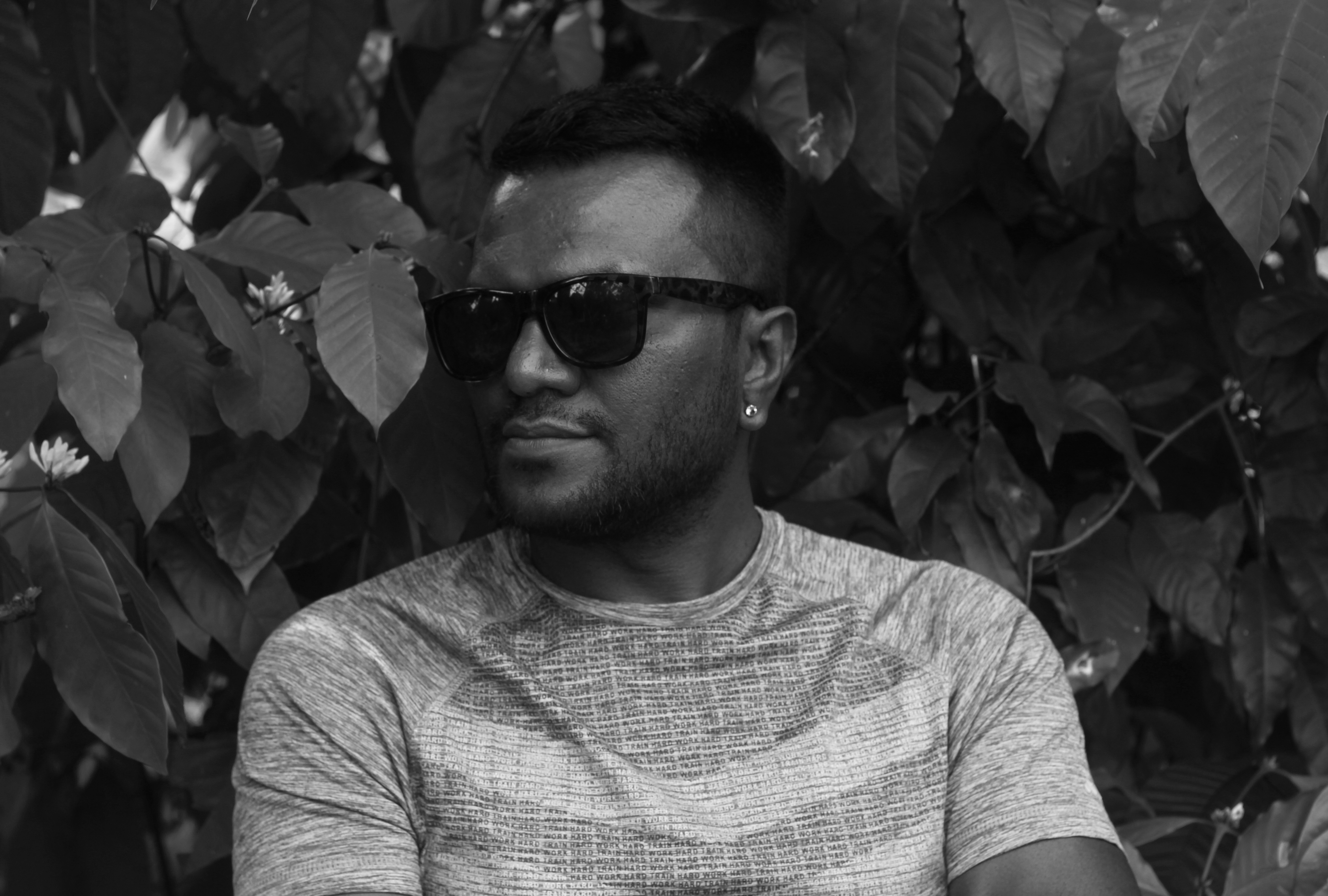
- Born: Sajan Mani; 1981 (age 44–45); Kunnoth, Kannur
- Citizenship: Indian
- Occupations: Artist, Contemporary Artist, Performance Artist
- Known for: Contemporary Art, Performance Art

Sajan Mani (born 1981 in Kunnoth, India) is a Berlin-based contemporary artist and Berlin Art Prize 2021 winner. He has exhibited at various international venues, including the Vancouver Biennale, the Kampala Art Biennale the Dhaka Art Summit and the Kolkata International Art Festival, on issues of various lives of marginalized people of India and post-colonial Dalit lives. He is working with drawing, performance art and video installations.

== Education ==
Sajan graduated in English Literature from Kannur University in 2004. Later, he graduated in fine arts from Karnataka State Open University in 2011. He later earned a master's degree in Spatial Strategies in 2019 from Weißensee Academy of Art Berlin.

== Biography ==
He was an editorial board member for the first edition of the Kochi-Muziris Biennale. He performed at the Vancouver Biennale, Kampala Art Biennale, Dhaka Art Summit, Kolkata International Performance Art Festival, Sensorium-Sunaparanta Art Festival, Goa, and Musrara Mix Festival. He was also selected as one of the artists of the Bergen Assembly (2025). Sajan received critical acclaim for the solo exhibition Alphabet of Touch > < Overseas Stretched Bodies and Muted Howls for Songs, exhibited at the Nome Gallery in Berlin.

== Awards and Honours ==
- Villa Romana Prize (2025)
- Prince Claus Mentorship Award (2022)
- Berlin Art Prize (2021)
- Between 2019 and 2022, he received an artistic research grant from the Berlin Senate and a Fine Arts Scholarship from Braunschweig Projects.
- Akademie Schloss Solitude Fellowship (Stuttgart, Germany)

== Important works ==
- Citizen Ship Burn It Down!
- Liquidity Ar
- Secular Meat
- Caste-pital
- Politically Incorrect Bodies
- Specters of Communism
- Art will Never Die, but COW?
- Alphabet of Touch> <Over Stretched Bodies and Muted Houses for Songs

== Gallery ==
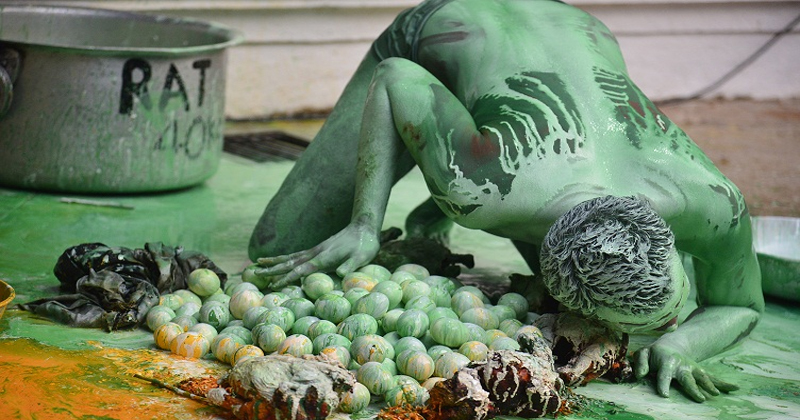
Secular Meat Senparanta Art Center, Goa

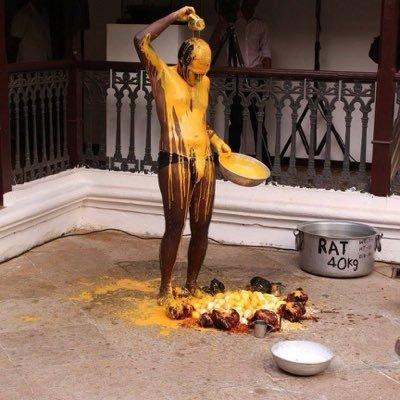
Secular Meat
