= Otto Hofmann (artist) =

German painter (1907–1996)

Otto Hofmann (28 April 1907 in Essen – 23 July 1996 in Pompeiana) was a German painter.

== Life ==
From 1928 to 1930 Hofmann studied at the Bauhaus in Dessau, where he learned from Paul Klee and Wassily Kandinsky. In 1930, the Bauhaus set up its own exhibition for his works and in the same year he was invited by the Jenaer Kunstverein for the Young Artists from the Bauhaus Dessau exhibition. When the National Socialists took power, his work was banned as degenerate and he fled to Switzerland and Paris as a member of the KPD. In 1934 he worked for Paul Klee in Bern. In 1935 he returned to Germany, married Hanna Stirnemann and lived in seclusion in Hainichen near Dornburg, where the couple worked closely with the ceramist Otto Lindig. In 1939 Hofmann was drafted into military service and sent to the Eastern Front. In 1945 he was taken prisoner by the Soviets.

After his release he moved to Rudolstadt in Thuringia in 1946, where he resumed his artistic activity. Since his work was not appreciated in the GDR either, he moved to West Berlin in 1950, where he received the Berlin Art Prize in 1953 and then lived as an artist in Paris from 1953 to 1965. Between 1966 and 1975 Hofmann taught at the Academy of Fine Arts in Berlin. From 1976 he lived and worked in Pompeiana until his death.

The exhibition The Poetics of the Bauhaus in the Palazzo Ducale in Genoa divides his life's work into four phases: Das Bauhaus und die Jahre der Zensur, Russland, Das geteilte Deutschland und die europäischen Aufenthalte sowie Pompeiana. The art historian Helmut Börsch-Supan said about Hofmann's work: Für mich sind seine Bilder und die Ausstrahlung seiner Persönlichkeit untrennbar miteinander verbunden. Er malte so wie er war als ein unkorruptierbarer Charakter, der lieber Zurücksetzung in Kauf nahm, als sich anzupassen. (Translation:) For me, his paintings and the charisma of his personality are inextricably linked. He painted as he was as an incorruptible character who would rather put up with than conform.

Occasionally works by Otto Hofmann can be found in auctions.
