= Gerda Lammers =

German soprano

Gerda Lammers (September 25, 1915 – January 28, 1993) was a German soprano.

A native of Berlin, Lammers studied with Lula Mysz-Gmeiner and Margaret Schwedler-Lohmann, making her debut as a concert singer in 1939. Her operatic debut came at the Bayreuth Festival in 1955, when she sang Ortlinde in Die Walküre. That same year she joined the roster of the Kassel Opera, singing Marie in Wozzeck. In 1957 she replaced Christel Goltz as Elektra at the Royal Opera House, leading to much acclaim. She performed Dido in Dido and Aeneas the following year at Ingestre Hall, and returned to Covent Garden as Kundry in Parsifal in 1959. Her preference was for concert singing, and she returned to that field in the 1960s. She continued to appear on stage as well, debuting at the Metropolitan Opera as Elektra in 1962. Lammers died in Kassel.
