= Karl Förster =

German poet and translator

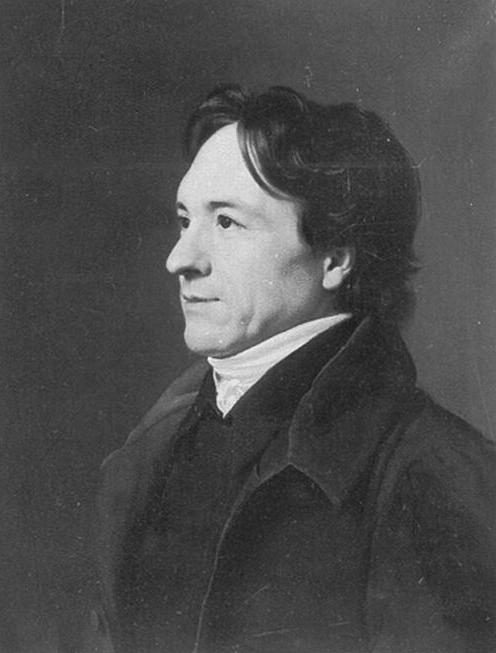
- Portrait by Carl Christian Vogel von Vogelstein, 1823

Karl Förster (9 March 1784 – 27 November 1841) was a German poet and translator.

== Biography ==
He was born at Naumburg, a son of Johann Christian Förster, preacher in the cathedral in that city. After studying theology and philosophy at Leipzig, he was appointed professor of the German language and literature at the Military Academy in Dresden in 1807. He completed Wilhelm Müller's Bibliothek der deutschen Dichter des 17ten Jahrhunderts, and wrote many poems, several of which have been set to music. They were collected and published in 1843. His translations from the classic poets of Italy were also celebrated.
