= Des Keogh =

Irish actor (born 1935)

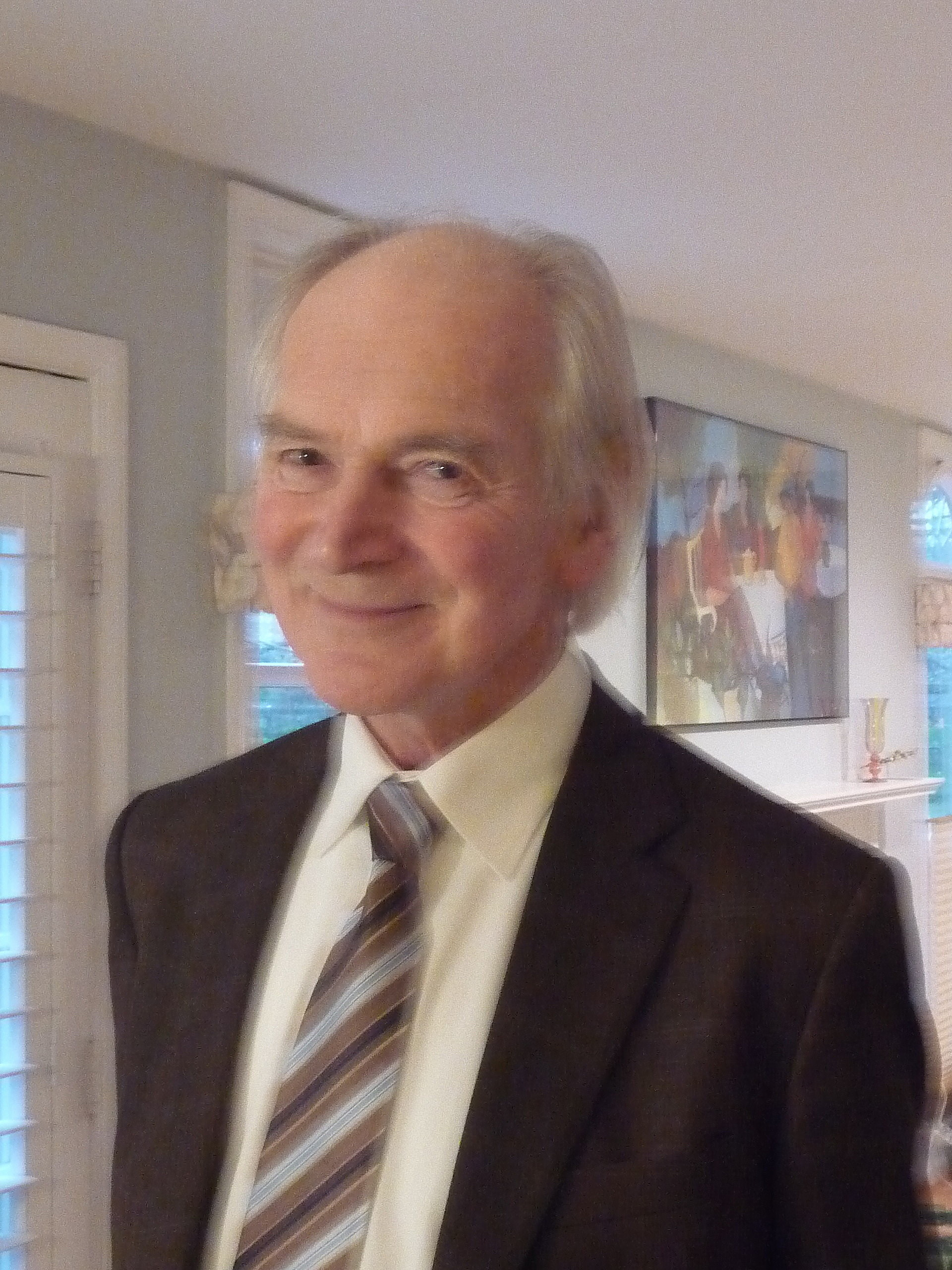
- Born: Desmond Keogh; 27 February 1935 (age 91); Birr, County Offaly, Ireland
- Occupations: actor, radio personality, author
- Years active: early 1950s-present
- Spouse: Geraldine O'Grady (m. 1965; died 2025)
- Children: Oonagh

Desmond Keogh (born 27 February 1935) is an Irish actor. He was born in Birr, County Offaly. He was trained as a lawyer before entering the theatre in his twenties.

He has toured widely in a one-man show called The Love-Hungry Farmer, an adaptation by Keogh from a work by the Irish playwright John B. Keane. He has also appeared in a one-man show of Confessions of an Irish Publican by the same playwright.

Keogh has worked with major Irish theatre companies, and also in the London theatre. His film credits include Ryan's Daughter, Ulysses, and Flight of the Doves.

For approximately 35 years, Keogh hosted a weekly radio program for RTÉ's Light Programme called Music for Middlebrows. It was also the name of book on the subject he wrote in 1998.

In April 2010, Keogh appeared in the title role in the play Da by Hugh Leonard at the Olney Theatre Center for the Arts in Olney, Maryland, USA.

In 2016 he starred with Derry Power in the play The Quiet Land by Malachy McKenna.

From 2016, Keogh appeared as Reg Barker on the CBBC series, Little Roy.

== Filmography ==
Year	Title	Role	Notes
1967	Ulysses	Joe Hynes	
1970	The McKenzie Break	Guard	Uncredited
1970	Ryan's Daughter	Lanky private	
1971	Flight of the Doves	Ticket Man	Uncredited
1977	Philadelphia, Here I Come	Dr.Francis King	
2014	The Legend of Longwood	Cedric Higgins	
2016	Sing Street	Brother Barnabas	
2016	The Flag	Stuart	
