= Otto Placzek =

German sculptor

- Born: 25 January 1884; Berlin, Germany
- Died: 30 September 1968 (aged 84); Berlin, Germany
- Occupation: Sculptor

Otto Placzek (25 January 1884 – 30 September 1968) was a German sculptor and medallist. His work was part of the art competitions at the 1932 Summer Olympics and the 1936 Summer Olympics.

During the Nazi era Placzek was a member of the Reich Chamber of Fine Arts. His participation in 19 group exhibitions during this period is documented, including all of the Great German Art Exhibitions in Munich from 1939 to 1943.
