= Geraldine O'Grady =

Irish violinist (1932–2025)

- Born: 18 October 1932; Dublin, Ireland
- Died: 11 November 2025 (aged 93); Dublin, Ireland
- Occupation: Classical violinist
- Spouse: Des Keogh (m. 1965)
- Children: 1

Geraldine O'Grady (18 October 1932 – 11 November 2025) was an Irish violinist.

From a prominent musical family, in 1955, O'Grady became the first Irish artist to graduate from the Paris Conservatoire. She was the first woman to lead the RTÉ Symphony Orchestra, from 1959 to 1963. She had a solo career, touring with the Boston Pops, the Kansas City Philharmonic, and the Baltimore Symphony Orchestra, among others. In 1977, The New York Times described her as an "artist of the first rank".

O'Grady died on 11 November 2025, at the age of 93. Paying tribute, President Catherine Connolly described her as "internationally recognised as a musician of the greatest skill, who leaves a wonderful legacy of work". She was married to the writer and actor Des Keogh.
