= Hermann Czech =

Austrian architect

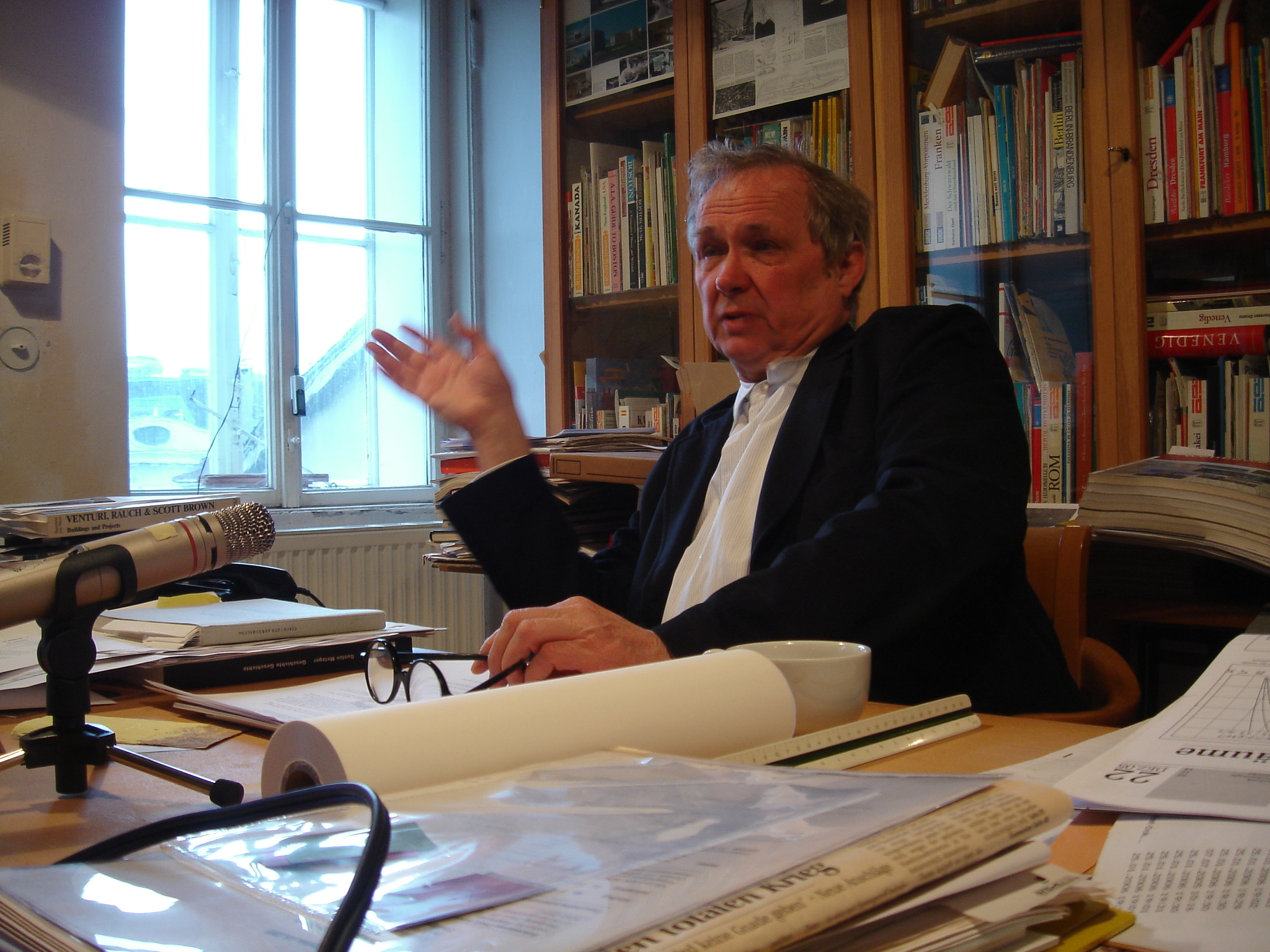
Hermann Czech, 2006

Hermann Czech (born 10 November 1936) is an Austrian architect. He was born and lives in Vienna, Austria, where he has a private practice.

== Education and teaching positions ==
Hermann Czech studied architecture at the Technical University of Vienna and in the master classes of Ernst Plischke at the Academy of Fine Arts Vienna. In 1958 and 1959 he participated in the seminars of Konrad Wachsmann at the Summer Academy in Salzburg.

From 1974 to 1980 he was an assistant to Hans Hollein and Johannes Spalt at the University of Applied Arts Vienna. He has been a guest professor at that university (1985/86) and a visiting professor at Harvard University (1988/89 and 1993/94), ETH Zurich (2004–07) and the Academy of Fine Arts Vienna (2011–12).

== Work ==
Czech has been influenced by the Viennese architects Adolf Loos and Josef Frank, and by the theoretical work of Konrad Wachsmann. His work is noted for a strong emphasis on context, a sophisticated and often ironic use of architectural elements, and an interest in rules and underlying order rather than sculptural form.

== Selected works ==
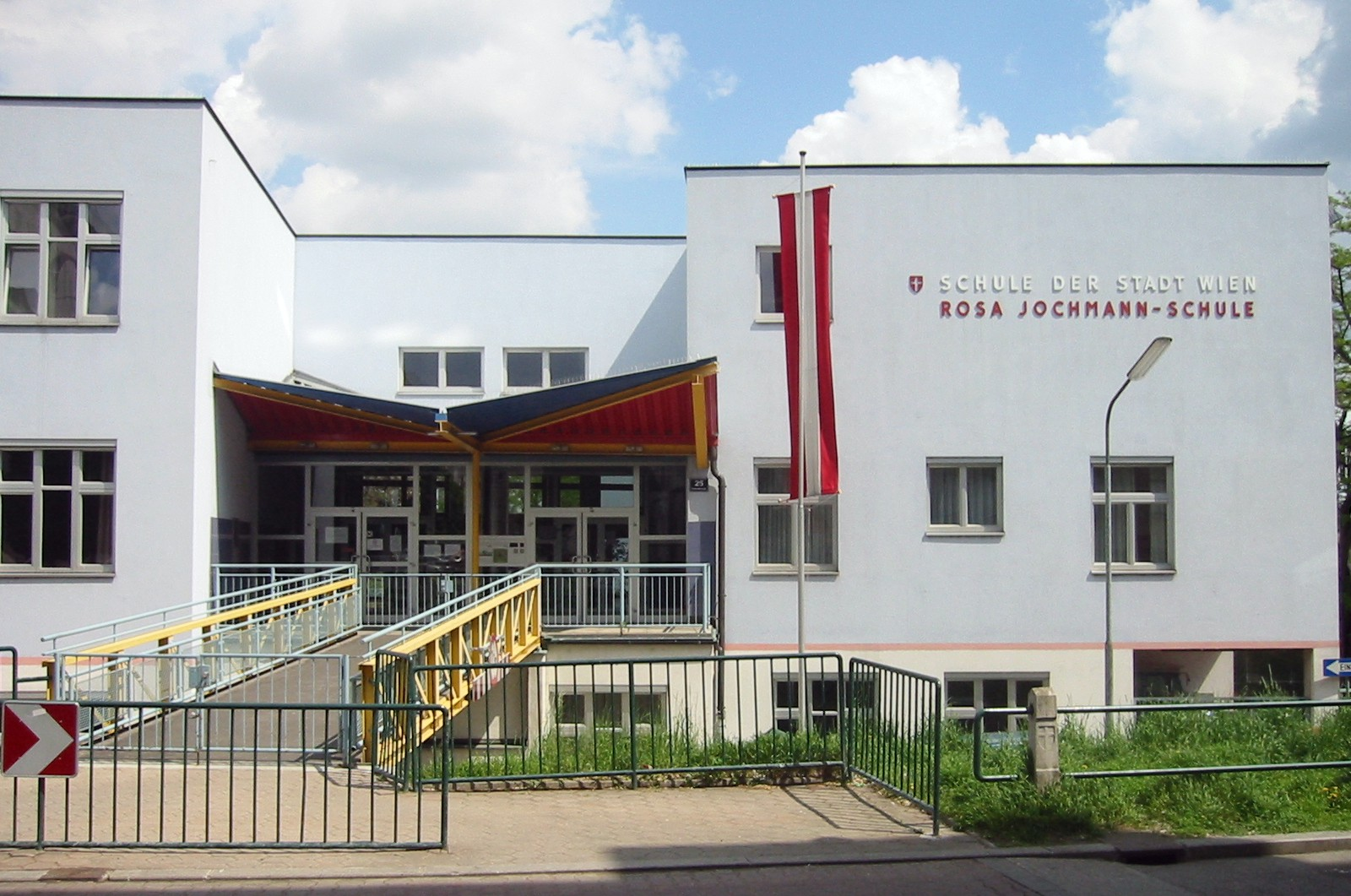
Rosa-Jochmann elementary school in Simmering, Vienna

- Kleines Café, Franziskanerplatz 3, 1010, Vienna 1970/73–74
- Apartment Klemmer, Vienna 1971–72
- Antiquariat Löcker and Wögenstein, Vienna 1973/79
- Wunder-Bar, Schönlaterngasse 8, Vienna 1975–76
- M House, Schwechat, Vienna 1977–81
- Interior for M. and H Poeschl, Vienna 1978-80
- Addition to Villa Pflaum, Altenberg, Vienna 1977–79
- Art Dealership/Gallery Hummel, Vienna 1978–80
- S House, Vienna 1980–83
- Restaurant Salzamt, Ruprechtsplatz 1, 1010, Vienna 1981–83
- Underground renovation (restaurant, bar, lobby, kitchen, staff rooms, banquet halls) in Palais Schwarzenberg, Vienna 1982–84

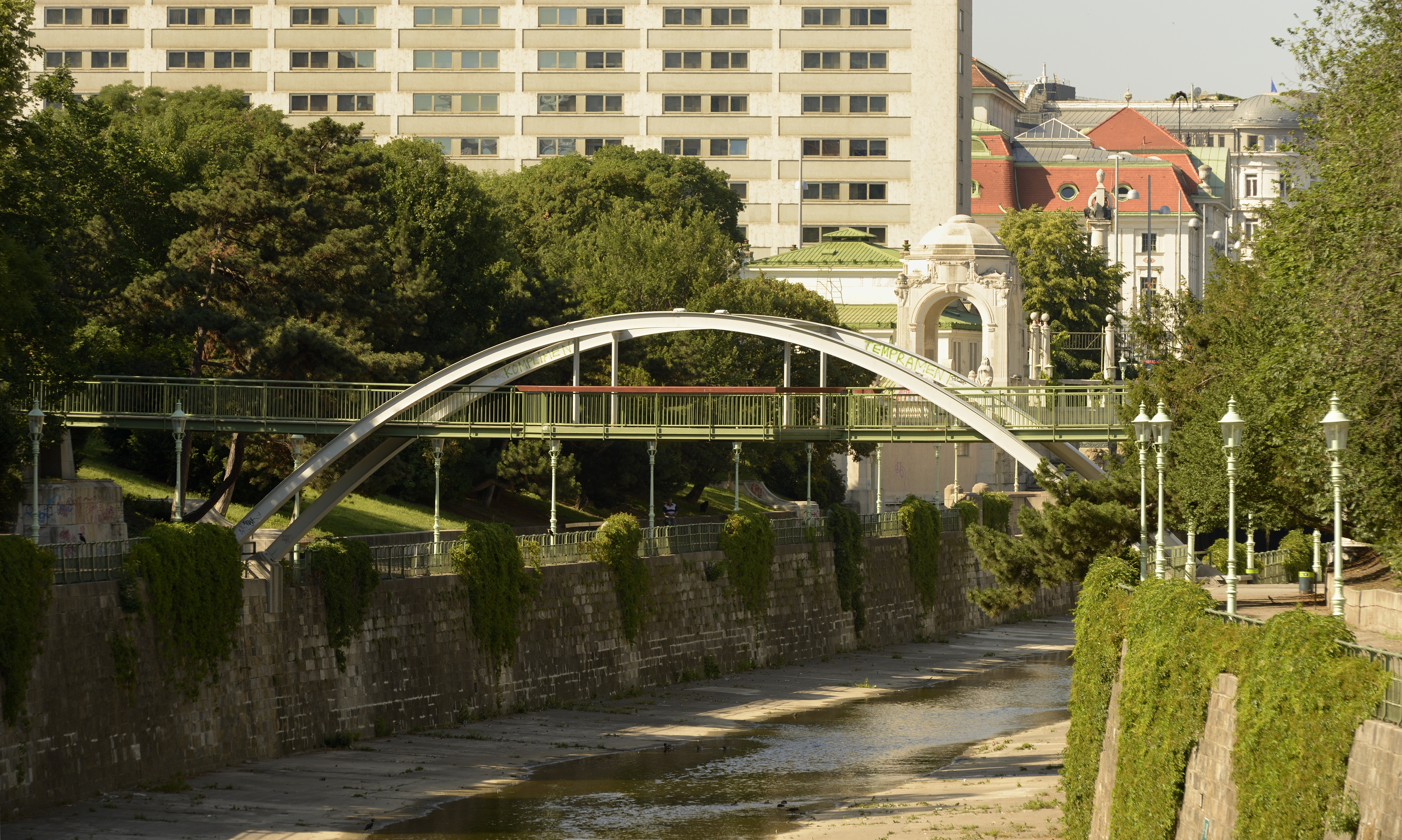
Footbridge in Vienna Stadtpark

- Stadtpark footbridge, Vienna 1985–87
- Apartment Building Petrusgasse, Vienna 1985–89
- Antiquitätengeschäft Kaesser, Vienna 1985–86
- Wohnbebauung Brunnergasse/Franz-Kamtner-Weg, Perchtoldsdorf bei Vienna 1989/90–94
- Arcadia Store in Vienna State Opera, (with Stephan Seehof), Vienna 1989
- Planning of U3-West subway, Vienna 1990/92–97
- Winter glazing ("greenhouse") of the loggia of the Vienna State Opera, Vienna 1991–94
- Rosa-Jochmann elementary school, Simmering, Vienna 1991–94
- MAK Café in Museum of Applied Arts, Vienna 1993
- Renovation of Bank Austria building, Am Hof, Vienna 1992/93–97
- Reconstruction and renovation of Liesing Employment Office by Ernst Plischke 1994/96–98
- Verkaufsfiliale und Zentrallager IKERA/Wein & Co, Vienna 1996–97
- Theatercafé, Vienna 1998/2010
- Renovation of Haus Schwarzenberg, Turrach 1998–99
- Furnishing of seminar center and guest house, Swiss Re, (with Adolf Krischanitz), Zürich Rüschlikon 1998–2000
- Geblergasse residence, Vienna 1998–2003
- Umbau Oetker, Dachgeschosse und Turm eines Altbaus ab dem 16.Jh., Vienna 1999–2003
- Gasthaus Immervoll, Vienna 2000
- Hotel Messe Vienna 2002/03–05
- Einrichtung Bundestheaterkassen, Vienna 2003–04
- Weinhaus PUNKT, Kaltern/Südtirol 2004–05
- Renovation of Urbani House, Vienna 2004–07
- Mustersiedlung 9=12, Vienna 2007
- Generationen-Wohnen am Mühlgrund, Vienna 2011
