= Florian Beigel =

German architect (1941–2018)

Florian Beigel (10 October 1941 – 25 August 2018) born in Constance, Southern Germany, was an architect living and working in London since 1969. He was the director of Florian Beigel Architects, and of the Architecture Research Unit (ARU) and he was Professor of Architecture at London Metropolitan University.

In 2013 Florian Beigel was awarded the Großer Berliner Kunstpreis (Great Arts Prize) by the Akademie der Künste in Berlin.

In 2014 he received the Annie Spink Award for Excellence in Architectural Education from the Royal Institute of British Architects.

See architectural projects and a list of publications of Florian Beigel, Philip Christou, and the Architecture Research Unit (up to 2017) at: aru.londonmet.ac.uk/
