= Klaus Hellwig =

German classical pianist

Klaus Hellwig (born 3 August 1941) is a German pianist and academic teacher.

== Life and career ==
Born in Essen, Hellwig studied with Detlef Kraus in Essen and Pierre Sancan in Paris as well as in master classes with Guido Agosti and Wilhelm Kempff and has won prizes at international competitions.

He has performed as a soloist worldwide, among others in Europe, the US, Brazil, Australia and Asia with renowned orchestras such as the San Francisco Symphony Orchestra, the Bavarian Radio Symphony Orchestra, the NDR Elbphilharmonie Orchestra, the WDR Symphony Orchestra Cologne, the Baltimore Symphony Orchestra, the Philharmonia Hungarica and the Krakauer Philharmonie.

As chamber musician, he founded the "Berlin Trio" with Christiane Edinger and Lluís Claret, and performed together among others with the wind players of the Berliner Philharmonic, the Philharmonischen Streichoktett Berlin as well as the octett of the Cleveland Orchestra.

As professor of piano, Hellwig taught from 1970 to 1980 at the Folkwang-Hochschule Essen and since 1980 at the Berlin University of the Arts. He also gives master classes worldwide and is a jury member at international competitions. He has released numerous records and CDs and has made recordings with German radio stations.
