= Christiane Edinger =

German woman violinist

Christiane Edinger (born 20 March 1945) is a German violinist.

== Life ==
Edinger was born in Potsdam in 1945, the daughter of the pianist and music teacher Gerhard Puchelt. She grew up in Berlin. Her ancestors include the politician and publicist Arnold Ruge (1802–80), the lawyer and politician Gabriel Riesser (1806–63) and the neurologist Ludwig Edinger (1855–1918).

Until 1960, she attended the Königin-Luise-Schule in Berlin, then until 1964 she studied at the Berlin University of the Arts, where Vittorio Brero was her teacher. Further studies with Joseph Fuchs at the Juilliard School in New York City (1965–67) followed, and in 1963/64, she also attended courses given by Nathan Milstein in Gstaad.

She made her debut as a concert violinist at the Berliner Festspiele in 1962. In 1964, she played with the Berliner Philharmoniker for the first time, followed by her debut in 1966 at the Carnegie Hall. This was followed by concert tours to various European countries, the USA, the Soviet Union, South America, India, Africa, China and Japan. During her trip to India, she performed the Tchaikovsky violin concerto with the Bombay Philharmonic Orchestra conducted by Joachim Buhler.

From 1994 until her retirement, Edinger was professor at the Lübeck Academy of Music.
