= Kirill Troussov =

German violinist (born 1982)

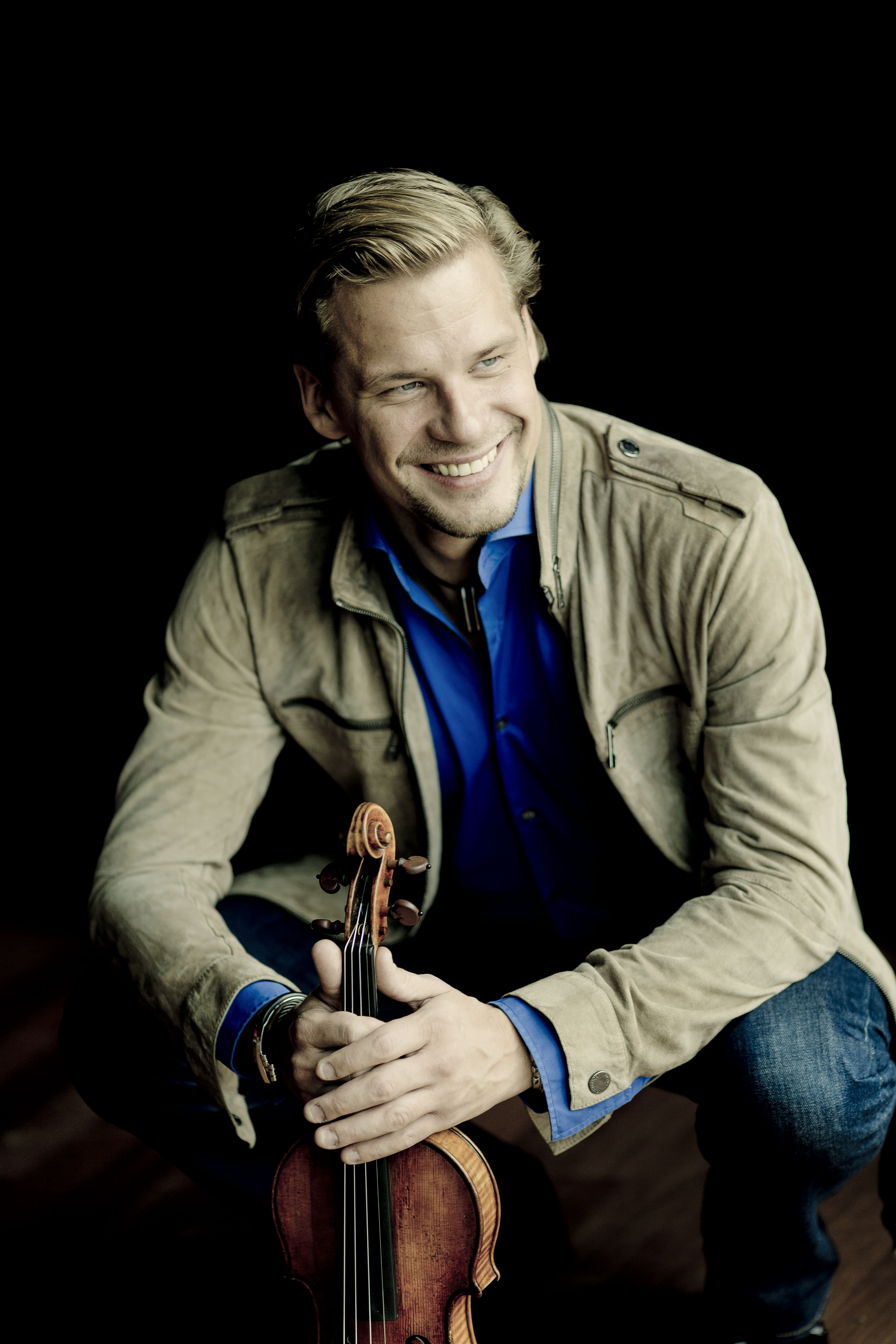
- Kirill Troussov 2013
- Born: March 7, 1982 (age 44); Leningrad, Soviet Union
- Occupations: Violinist and violin teacher
- Years active: 1988–present
- Relatives: Alexandra Troussova (sister)

Kirill Troussov (Russian: Кирилл Труссов, born 7 March 1982) is a German violinist and violin teacher based in Munich, Germany.

== Career ==
Kirill Troussov began playing the violin at the age of four and was taught by Irina Etigon at the Leningrad Conservatory. In 1990 his family moved to Germany where he continued his studies at the Musikhochschule Lübeck and the Hochschule für Musik und Tanz Köln until 2005 with professor Zakhar Bron, whom he also followed for a year at the Reina Sofía School of Music in Madrid. He accomplished his studies by Christoph Poppen at the Hochschule für Musik und Theater München with a Master of Arts (Konzertexamen/Meisterklasse). Among his mentors are Igor Oistrach and Yehudi Menuhin.

== Life ==
In 1990 he made his debut in Moscow, with the Russian National Orchestra conducted by Arnold Katz. Since then, Kirill Troussov has played with world’s leading orchestras, including the Staatskapelle Berlin, the Leipzig Gewandhaus Orchestra, the Orchestre de Paris, the Orchestre National de France, the Orchestre National de Montpellier Languedoc-Roussillon, the Academy of St. Martin in the Fields, the Wuhan Symphony Orchestra, the Czech Philharmonic, the Southwest German Radio Symphony Orchestra, the Munich Philharmonic, the Bamberg Symphony, the Russian National Orchestra, the Orchestra del Maggio Musicale Fiorentino, and many others. He has worked with internationally renowned conductors, such as Sir Neville Marriner, Daniele Gatti, Lawrence Foster, Jiří Bělohlávek, David Stern, Christoph Poppen, Vladimir Spivakov, Mikko Franck, Krzysztof Urbanski and Louis Langrée, among others.

In 2010 he replaced Gidon Kremer at the Théâtre des Champs-Élysées in Paris with the Orchestre National de France conducted by Daniele Gatti. He played Béla Bartók‘s Violin Concerto No. 1 and Rudi Stephan’s “Music for Violin and Orchestra”. The concert was broadcast live on Radio France and was highly acclaimed by the music press. As soloist, chamber musician and teacher Kirill Troussov is regularly invited to various festivals among which: the Verbier Festival, the Menuhin Festival Gstaad, the Schleswig-Holstein Musik Festival, the Ludwigsburger Schlossfestspiele and the Kronberg Academy in Frankfurt am Main. The concert halls where he performed include: the Berliner Philharmonie and the Konzerthaus Berlin, the Concertgebouw in Amsterdam, the Palais des Beaux-Arts de Bruxelles, the Théâtre du Châtelet, the Théâtre des Champs-Elysées and the Auditorium du Louvre in Paris, the De Doelen in Rotterdam as well as the Auditorio Nacional de Música in Madrid.

2011 - 2014 he was the assistant of professor Christoph Poppen at the Hochschule für Musik und Theater München. Troussov gives master classes for Violin and Chamber music in Germany and abroad. He frequently participates in projects at the Kronberg Academy in Frankfurt am Main. In 2013, he toured in China with the Verbier Festival Chamber Orchestra, the tour was a huge success. He performed “The Four Seasons” by Antonio Vivaldi and Astor Piazzolla. In addition to his work as a soloist and teacher, Kirill Troussov is also a passionate chamber musician and collaborates with artists like Yuri Bashmet, Gautier Capuçon, Julia Fischer, Sol Gabetta, Natalia Gutman, Frans Helmerson, Daniel Hope, Mischa Maisky, Julien Quentin, Julian Rachlin, Heinrich Schiff, Dmitry Sitkovetsky, Yuja Wang and Christian Zacharias.

2014, 2016 Kirill Troussov was a member of the jury at the Schoenfeld International String Competition in China.

== Instruments ==
- 1997–2006 Troussov has been playing the Antonio Stradivari violin “Le Renyier” from 1727, provided by the luxury-goods company LVMH (Louis Vuitton Moët Hennessy)
- Since 2006 Kirill Troussov plays the Antonio Stradivari violin “The Brodsky”, on which Adolph Brodsky premiered Pyotr Ilyich Tschaikovsky Violin Concerto on December 4, 1881. The violin is a private loan.

== Prizes and awards ==
- 1993 - First prize at the International Oleg Kagan Violin Competition
- 1993 - prize winner at the Yehudi Menuhin International Competition for Young Violinists in Folkestone
- 1994 - First prize at the International Henryk Wieniawski Violin Competition
- 1994 - “Davidoff Preis” at the Schleswig-Holstein Musik Festival
- 1995 - “Reuters-Scholarship” at the Verbier Festival
- 1998 - European Cultural Award “Pro-Europa” Europäischer Kulturpreis
- 2003 - “Yamaha” music prize

== Recordings ==
- 1994 - CD - Niccolò Paganini Violin Concerto No. 1, with Sinfonia Varsovia, conducted by Justus Frantz - “Davidoff Preis“- award at the Schleswig-Holstein Musik Festival
- 1999 - Recital CD (EMI Classics) with his sister Alexandra Troussova (piano) - works by Beethoven, Brahms, Wieniawski, Rimsky-Korsakov and Zimbalist - awarded the “Diapason d’Or” by the magazine Diapason, the “Choc” by the magazine Le Monde de la musique and the “Recommandé” by the magazine Classica (magazine).
- 2003 - Recital CD (Musica Numeris) with Alexandra Troussova - works by Prokofiev and Beethoven
- 2011 - CD (Naxos Records). Reinhard Schwarz-Schilling Violin Concerto with the Staatskapelle Weimar conducted by José Serebrier
- 2011 - Troussov appears on the DVD of Yuja Wang with Kurt Masur – works by Mendelssohn
- 2014 - CD (Farao Classics) – works by Mendelssohn
- 2015 - CD Memories (Naxos Records) with his sister Alexandra Troussova (piano)
- 2016 - CD Emotions (Naxos Records) with his sister Alexandra Troussova (piano)
