= Mathias Spahlinger =

German composer

Mathias Spahlinger (born 15 October 1944 in Frankfurt) is a German composer. His work takes place in a field of tension between diverse musical influences and styles. Between Renaissance music and jazz; between musique concrète and post-Webernian minimalism; between noise, improvisation, and notation; and between aesthetic autonomy and political consciousness, Spahlinger's works carry out conflicts for which there are no fixed models.

== Life ==
His father was a cellist. He taught him fiddle, viola da gamba, recorder, and later cello from 1951. In 1952 he got piano lessons. In 1959 he began to study jazz intensively, took saxophone lessons and wanted to become a jazz musician. In 1962 he left school and took an apprenticeship as a typesetter. During this time he took private composition lessons with Konrad Lechner. After finishing his apprenticeship he continued his studies with Lechner at the Akademie für Tonkunst in Darmstadt. In 1968 he became a teacher at the Stuttgart Music School for piano, theory, early musical education and experimental music. From 1973 to 1977 he studied composition with Erhard Karkoschka at the Musikhochschule Stuttgart. In 1978 he became a guest lecturer for music theory at the Berlin University of the Arts, and in 1984 professor for composition and music theory at the University of Music Karlsruhe. From 1990 he was professor of composition and director of the Institute for New Music at the Freiburg University of Music. Since 1996, he is a member of the Academy of Arts, Berlin. In 2012 he declined the Ernst von Siemens Musikstiftung grant for his commissioned composition "off" (1993/2011) for the Swiss festival "usinesonore".

== Prizes and awards ==
- 2014: Großer Berliner Kunstpreis

== Work ==
=== Orchestra ===
- 1975 morendo – for orchestra
- 1981 $R{\overset{a}\underset{i}{ou}}{}_{FF}^{GH}$ (strange?) – for five jazz soloists and orchestra
- 1986 inter-mezzo, concertato non concertabile tra pianoforte e orchestra
- 1988–1990 passage / paysage – for orchestra
- 1993 und als wir – for 54 strings
- 1997–1998 akt, eine treppe herabsteigend (nude descending a staircase) – for bass clarinet, trombone and orchestra (after Nude Descending a Staircase, No. 2 by Marcel Duchamp)
- 2009 doppelt bejaht (affirmed twice), etudes for orchestra without conductor
- 2011 lamento, protocol – for cello and orchestra

=== Chamber music ===
- 1969 five movements – for two pianos
- 1970 szenen für kinder (scenes for children) – for groups of children
- 1972 phonophobie – for flute, oboe, clarinet, horn and bassoon
- 1975 four pieces – for voice, clarinet, violin, cello and piano
- 1976 128 erfüllte Augenblicke (128 fulfilled moments), systematically arranged, to be played variably – for soprano, clarinet and cello
- 1977 éphémère – for percussion, veritable instruments and piano
- 1979–1980 extension – for violin and piano
- 1981 aussageverweigerung / gegendarstellung (refusal to testify/contradictory presentation) – two contra-contexts for double quartets
- 1982 ἀπò δῶ (over here) – for string quartet
- 1982–1983 adieu m'amour (farwell, my love), hommage à Guillaume Dufay – for violin and violoncello
- 1983 musica impura (impure music) – for soprano, guitar and percussion
- 1991 furioso – for 14 players with 23 instruments
- 1992–1993 presentimientos, variations for string trio
- 1993, revised 2011 off – for six snare drums
- 1995 gegen unendlich (to infinity) – for bass clarinet, trombone, cello and piano
- 1995 Über den frühen Tod Fräuleins Anna Augusta Marggräfin zu Baden (On the Untimely Death of Miss Anna Augusta, Marchioness of Baden) – for five male voices, five trombones, three female voices, oboe, clarinet and trumpet
- 2000 verlorener weg (lost way) version 1 and 2 – for ensemble
- 2002 einräumung, #3 of konzepte und varianten (concepts and variants), three simultaneous solos for violin, viola and cello
- 2003 pnw, #4 of konzepte und varianten (concepts and variants) – for eight cellos and five double basses
- 1997–2005 farben der frühe (colors of dawn) – for seven pianos
- 2006 fugitive beauté (fleeting beauty)- for oboe, alto flute and violin, bass clarinet, viola and cello
- 2010 ausgang (exit), #1 of konzepte und varianten (concepts and variants) – for ensemble
- 2010 rundweg (round way), #2 of konzepte und varianten (concepts and variants) – for recorder, violin and cello
- 2012 entfernte ergänzung (removed addition) – for four (also three or two) guitars
- 2014 nachtstück mit sonne (nocturne with sun), #7 of asamisimasa-zyklus – for ten-string guitar solo with clarinet, percussion, piano and cello
- 2015 still/moving, #8 of asamisimasa-zyklus – for clarinet and cello
- 2015 kuboå, #n of asamisimasa-zyklus – for voice, clarinet, percussion, guitar, piano and cello
- 2016 faux faux faux bourdon, #2 of asamisimasa-zyklus – for bass clarinet solo with percussion, guitar, piano and cello
- 2017 flashback (mit rückschaufehlern), #3 of asamisimasa-zyklus – for a vibraphone player (two vibraphones tuned a quarter-tone apart), a guitarist (quarter-tone electric guitar) and a pianist (piano and keyboard, tuned a quarter-tone apart)
- 2018 difference négligeable, #1 of asamisimasa-zyklus – for cello and guitar
- 2018 double, #6 of asamisimasa-zyklus – for clarinet, drums, guitar, piano and cello
- 2019 un-umkehr, #4 of asamisimasa-zyklus – for clarinet, drums, guitar, piano and cello
- 2019 don’t kill me, i am beautiful, #9 of asamisimasa-zyklus – for bass clarinet, small drum, piano and cello
- 2019 nahe null, #10 of asamisimasa-zyklus – for clarinet, drums, guitar, piano and cello

=== Vocal work ===
- 1969 drama – for twelve voices
- 1974 sotto voce – for vocalists
- 1979–1980 el sonido silencioso (the silent sound), funeral music for Salvador Allende – for seven female voices
- 1983 signale – choral scenes without singing
- 1983–1985 verfluchung – for three vocalists with wooden percussion instruments
- 1985 in dem ganzen ocean von empfindungen eine welle absondern, sie anhalten (in the whole ocean of sensations separate off a single wave and stop it) – for three choruses and eight channel playback
- 1993 vorschläge, concepts for making (super)fluous the function of the composer

=== Solo instrument ===
- 1974 entlöschend (non extinguishing) – for large tam-tam
- 1992 nah, getrennt – for alto recorder solo
- 2013 ausnahmslos ausnahmen – for drumset
- 2017 doppelt und dreifach determiniert, #5 of asamisimasa-zyklus – for a drummer with five tom-toms
- 2018 k141, #11 of asamisimasa-zyklus – for piano

=== Tape ===
- 1974 wozu noch musik? (why still music?), aesthetic theory in quasi-aesthetic form (collage) – radio play
- 1975 störung – electronic music

=== Music theater ===
- 1970 fürsich – for an actress or an actor
- 1980 pablo picasso: wie man wünsche beim schwanz packt (Pablo Picasso: desire caught by the tail) – Drama in six acts

=== Transcription ===
- 1977 alban berg: sonate für klavier op. 1 – transcription for orchestra

== Publications ==
chronological

- der widersinn von Gesang. zu theodor w. adornos liedkomposition, in MusikTexte 1, Februar 1983, 37–39.
- das starre – erzittert. zu nicolaus a. hubers 6 Bagatellen, MusikTexte 2, December 1983, 15–18.
- offener brief. an die teilnehmer des symposiums „Theodor W. Adorno – der Philosoph als Komponist“, in MusikTexte 26, October 1988, 59–60.
- gegen die postmoderne mode. zwölf charakteristika der musik des zwanzigsten jahrhunderts, in MusikTexte 7, January 1989, 2–7.
- wirklichkeit des bewußtseins und wirklichkeit für das bewußtsein. politische aspekte der musik, in MusikTexte 39, April 1991, 39–41.
- offener brief. die donaueschinger musiktage und der öffentlich-rechtliche rundfunk, in MusikTexte 65, July–August 1996, 72–74.
- easy to love [Umfrage zum Irakkrieg], MusikTexte 97, May 2003, 16–17.
- für gisela und reinhard. zwei jubiläen: 110 Jahre NM, 100 hefte MT, in MusikTexte 100, February 2004, 33.
- Bewegliche Reaktion auf das, was uns täglich umgibt. Nicolaus A. Hubers „Sphärenmusik“ für Orchester, in MusikTexte 108, February 2006, 61–65.
- dies ist die zeit der konzeptiven ideologen nicht mehr, in MusikTexte 113, May 2007, 35–43.
- Offener Brief. An Olivier Membrez, Association Usinesonor, Malleray-Bévilard, Schweiz, in: MusikTexte 132, February 2012, 85–86.
- mein freund reinhard, in MusikTexte 141, May 2014, 5.
- for musicians only?, in MusikTexte 142, August 2014, 14.
- thesen zu schwindel der wirklichkeit, in MusikTexte 142, August 2014, 15.
- politische implikationen des materials der neuen musik, in MusikTexte 151, November 2016, 57–72.

== Conversations ==
- „alles aus allem entwickeln“. Gespräch mit Reinhard Oehlschlägel über „passage/paysage“, in MusikTexte 39, April 1991, 23–32.
- Geschichte der Musik als Gegenwart: Hans Heinrich Eggebrecht und Mathias Spahlinger im Gespräch., Musik-Konzepte Sonderband, hrsg. von Heinz-Klaus Metzger und Rainer Riehn, München: edition text + kritik, 2000. ISBN 3-88377-655-6.
- „Ich sehe im Free Jazz ... die fortgeschrittenste Entwicklung.“ Gespräch mit Wolfgang Stryi, in MusikTexte 86/87, November 2000, 62–65.
- Maßstäbe außer Kraft setzen. Gespräch mit Reinhard Oehlschlägel, in MusikTexte 95, November 2002, 73–79.
- Von der schlechten Unendlichkeit. Gespräch mit Mark Barden, Johannes Kreidler und Martin Schüttler über „gegen unendlich“, in MusikTexte 137, May 2013, 19–25.

== Secondary literature ==
Chronological

- Claus Henning Bachmann: Ins Offene. Der Impuls zur Freiheit bei Mathias Spahlinger, in MusikTexte 39, April 1991, 22.
- Jean-Noel von der Weid: Die Musik des 20. Jahrhunderts. Frankfurt & Leipzig 2001, 408f. ISBN 3-458-17068-5
- Werner Klüppelholz: Obduktion der Ordnung. Zu Mathias Spahlingers „extension“, in MusikTexte 95, November 2002, 69–72.
- Rainer Nonnenmann: Bestimmte Negation. Anspruch und Wirklichkeit einer umstrittenen Strategie anhand von Spahlingers „furioso“, in MusikTexte 95, November 2002, 57–69.
- Reinhard Oehlschlägel: Radikalität und Widersprüchlichkeit. Variationen über Mathias Spahlinger , in MusikTexte 95, November 2002, 33–35.
- Dorothea Schüle: „... dann wird offenbar, daß alles auf Vereinbarung beruht“. Zur Idee der offenen Form in Mathias Spahlingers „verlorener weg“ (1999/2000), in MusikTexte 95, November 2002, 36–48.
- Jakob Ullmann: ... im vorgefühl der dämmerung. Zum Streichtrio „presentimientos“ von Mathias Spahlinger, in MusikTexte 95, November 2002, 49–54.
- Rainer Nonnenmann: Wider den Utopieverlust: Mathias Spahlingers „doppelt bejaht“ auf neuen Bahnen, in MusikTexte 124, February 2010, 57–63.
- Ulrich Tadday (ed.): Mathias Spahlinger. Musik-Konzepte 155. Munich: edition text + kritik, 2012, ISBN 978-3869161747
- Rainer Nonnenmann: Musik aus und alle Fragen offen: Auskomponierte Perspektivwechsel des Hörens am Beispiel von Werken Mathias Spahlingers, in MusikTexte 140, February 2014, 45–53.
