= List of people on the postage stamps of Ireland =

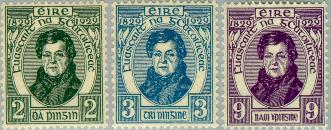
1929 commemorative set issued for Catholic emancipation centenary showing Daniel O'Connell

This is a list of people on stamps of Ireland, including the years when they appeared on a stamp.

Because no Irish stamps were designed prior to 1929, the first Irish stamps issued by the Provisional Government of Ireland were the then-current British definitive postage stamps bearing a portrait of George V that were overprinted Rialtas Sealadaċ na hÉireann 1922 (translates as Provisional Government of Ireland 1922) and issued on 17 February 1922. The overprint was later changed to Saorstát Éireann 1922 (Irish Free State 1922).

The Irish Free State issued the first commemorative stamps depicting a person on 22 June 1929 when Oifig an Phoist, the Irish Post Office, a section of the Department of Posts and Telegraphs, issued a set of three stamps showing Daniel O'Connell. O'Connell is one of a small number of people shown in two issues, including Wolfe Tone and Arthur Guinness. The 2009 Guinness issue included postmarks with his trade mark signature, a first in philately.

The Department of Posts and Telegraphs and, after 1984, An Post, designed stamps showing statesmen, religious, literary and cultural figures, athletes, etc. Until the mid-1990s it was usual policy not to issue stamps showing living persons, the only exceptions being Douglas Hyde (stamp 1943, d. 1949, illustrated below) and Louis le Brocquy (stamp 1977, d. 2012, illustrated below), but this policy has been put aside and there have recently been several issues showing living persons. For the millennium, 30 millennium stamps were issued showing living Irish sportsmen.

During the release of the 2022 Irish Oscar Winners stamps, An Post's retain managing director stated that The Irish Oscar Winners stamps celebrate the best in the business and serve as a reminder of what we, as Irish people, can achieve.

== 1929–1950s ==
Section sources:

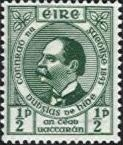
1943 stamp Douglas Hyde commemorating the Gaelic League

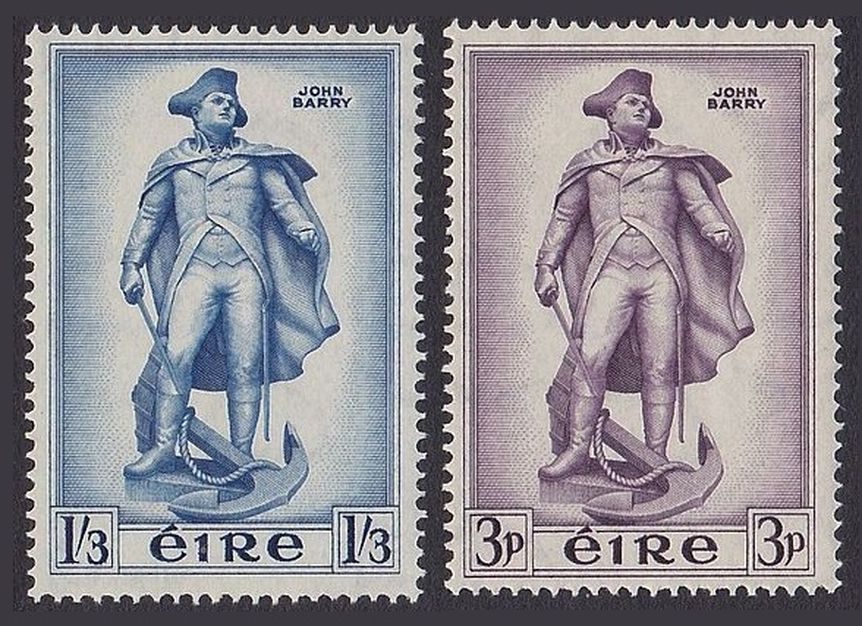
Commodore John Barry

- 1929 Daniel O'Connell
- 1937 Saint Patrick
- 1938 Father Mathew
- 1939 George Washington
- 1943 Sir William Rowan Hamilton
- 1943 Douglas Hyde
- 1944 Edmund Ignatius Rice
- 1948 Wolfe Tone
- 1949 James Clarence Mangan
- 1952 Thomas Moore
- 1953 Robert Emmet
- 1954 Cardinal John Henry Newman
- 1956 Commodore John Barry
- 1957 John Redmond
- 1957 Tomás Ó Criomhthain
- 1957 Admiral William Brown
- 1957 Father Luke Wadding
- 1958 Mother Mary Aikenhead
- 1958 Thomas J. Clarke
- 1959 Arthur Guinness

== 1960s and 1970s ==
Section sources:

- 1962 John O'Donovan
- 1962 Eugene O'Curry
- 1964 Wolfe Tone
- 1965 William Butler Yeats
- 1966 Éamonn Ceannt
- 1966 Thomas Clarke
- 1966 Joseph Mary Plunkett
- 1966 Seán Mac Diarmada
- 1966 Roger Casement
- 1966 Pádraig Pearse
- 1966 James Connolly
- 1966 Thomas MacDonagh
- 1967 Jonathan Swift
- 1968 Countess Markievicz
- 1969 Mahatma Gandhi
- 1970 Kevin Barry
- 1970 Terence MacSwiney
- 1970 Tomás Mac Curtain
- 1971 John Millington Synge
- 1974 Edmund Burke
- 1974 Oliver Goldsmith
- 1975 Nano Nagle
- 1976 Alexander Graham Bell
- 1976 Benjamin Franklin
- 1976 James Larkin
- 1977 Jack Butler Yeats
- 1977 Johannes Scottus Eriugena
- 1977 Louis le Brocquy
- 1978 Catherine McAuley
- 1978 William Orpen
- 1979 Pádraic Pearse
- 1979 Rowland Hill
- 1979 Pope John Paul II

== 1980s ==
Section sources:

1980

- George Bernard Shaw
- Oscar Wilde
- Seán O'Casey
- Saint Jean Baptiste de la Salle

1981

- Charles Parsons
- Harry Ferguson
- James Hoban
- Jeremiah O'Donovan Rossa
- John Holland
- Robert Boyle

1982

- St. Francis of Assisi
- Francis Makemie
- Pádraic Ó Conaire
- John Field
- James Joyce
- Charles Kickham
- Éamon de Valera

1983

- Pádraig Ó Siochfhradha
- Seán Mac Diarmada
- St. Vincent de Paul
- Andrew Jackson

1984

- John McCormack
- St. Brendan

1985

- Charles Stanford
- Turlough Carolan
- George Frideric Handel
- Giuseppe Domenico Scarlatti
- Johann Sebastian Bach
- Thomas Ashe
- George Berkeley

1986

- Arthur Griffith
- William Mulready

1987

- Canon John Hayes
- Mother Mary Martin
- Cathal Brugha

1988

- Sidney Nolan
- Barry Fitzgerald
- Robert O'Hara Burke
- W. T. Cosgrave
- John F. Kennedy

1989

- Seán T. O'Kelly
- Jawaharlal Nehru
- Margaret Burke Sheridan

== 1990s ==
Section sources:

1990

- Michael Collins, Irish revolutionary

1991

- General Godart van Ginkel
- Patrick Sarsfield
- John A. Costello
- Charles Stewart Parnell

1993

- Edward Bunting

1994

- Edmund Ignatius Rice
- Edmund Burke
- Éamonn Andrews
- George Bernard Shaw
- Samuel Beckett
- Seán MacBride
- William Butler Yeats

1995

- Guglielmo Marconi
- Bartholomew Mosse

1996

- Louie Bennett
- Lady Augusta Gregory
- Stanley Woods
- Artie Bell
- Alec Bennett
- Robert & Joey Dunlop
- Michael Davitt
- Thomas A. McLaughlin

1996 Centenary of Irish Cinema, a 4-stamp set featuring 12 actors in 4 Irish films

- Brenda Fricker as Mrs Brown in My Left Foot
- Daniel Day-Lewis as Christy Brown in My Left Foot
- Andrew Strong as Declan "Deco" Cuffe in The Commitments
- Angeline Ball as Imelda Quirke in The Commitments
- Maria Doyle Kennedy as Natalie Murphy in The Commitments
- Bronagh Gallagher as Bernie McGloughlin in The Commitments
- Richard Harris as 'Bull' McCabe in The Field
- Seán Bean as Tadhg McCabe in The Field
- John Hurt as The 'Bird' O'Donnell in The Field
- Colman "Tiger" King as A Man of Aran in Man of Aran
- Maggie Dirrane as His Wife in Man Of Aran
- Michael Dirrane as Their Son in Man Of Aran

1997 75th Anniversary of Irish Free State

- Linda Martin, singer
- Sonia O'Sullivan, athlete
- Alan Gough, soccer player
- Damian Hogan, Garda
- Marie Egan, Garda
- Brendan Walsh, Garda

1997

- Kate O'Brien
- St. Columcille
- Daniel O'Connell
- John Wesley

1998

- Lady Mary Heath née Sophie Catherine Pierce
- Col. James Fitzmaurice
- J.P. "Paddy" Saul
- Capt. Charles Blair
- Theobald Wolfe Tone
- Henry Joy McCracken

1999

- Seán Flanagan Millennium GAA Team
- Seán Murphy Millennium GAA Team
- John Joe O'Reilly Millennium GAA Team
- Martin O'Connell Millennium GAA Team
- Mick O'Connell Millennium GAA Team
- Tommy Murphy Millennium GAA Team
- Seán O'Neill Millennium GAA Team
- Seán Purcell Millennium GAA Team
- Pat Spillane Millennium GAA Team
- Mikey Sheehy Millennium GAA Team
- Tom Langan Millennium GAA Team
- Kevin Heffernan Millennium GAA Team
- Dan O'Keeffe Millennium GAA Team
- Enda Colleran Millennium GAA Team
- Joe Keohane Millennium GAA Team
- Micheál MacLiammóir
- Siobhán McKenna
- Noel Purcell
- Grace Kelly of Monaco
- Seán Lemass
- Jesse Owens
- St. Francis Xavier
- John Fitzgerald Kennedy
- Mother Teresa
- John McCormack
- Nelson Mandela

== 2000–2004 ==
Section source:

2000

- W. T. Cosgrave
- Éamon de Valera
- John A. Costello
- Seán Lemass
- Rev Nicholas Callan
- Thomas Alva Edison
- Albert Einstein
- Marie Curie
- Galileo Galilei
- Oscar Wilde
- Ludwig van Beethoven
- Ninette de Valois
- James Joyce
- Lady Lavery
- William Shakespeare
- Lory Meagher
- Eddie Keher
- Paddy Phelan
- Jim Langton
- Christy Ring
- Jack Lynch
- Ray Cummins
- John Doyle
- Tony Reddin
- Jimmy Doyle
- Bobby Rackard
- Nick O'Donnell
- Mick Mackey
- Brian Whelahan
- John Keane

2001

- Charles Lindbergh
- James Cook
- Robert O'Hara Burke
- Marco Polo
- Ernest Shackleton
- Gay Byrne
- Éamon de Valera
- Micheál Ó Hehir
- Peter Lalor
- Ned Kelly
- Nicky Rackard
- Frank Cummins
- Pádraic Cummins
- Jack O'Shea

2002

- Packie Bonner
- Roy Keane
- Paul McGrath
- David O'Leary
- Padre Pio
- Peter McDermott
- Jimmy Smyth
- Matt Connor
- Seánie Duggan
- U2: Bono
- U2: The Edge
- U2: Adam Clayton
- U2: Larry Mullen, Jr.
- Phil Lynott
- Van Morrison
- Rory Gallagher

2003

- St. Patrick
- Shauna Bradley
- Michael Breen
- Ezra Canty
- Michael Mullins
- Robert Emmet
- Thomas Russell
- Anne Devlin
- James Barry
- Frank O'Connor
- Ernest Walton
- Admiral William Brown
- Commodore John Barry
- Captain Robert Halpin
- Captain Richard Roberts
- Pope John Paul II

2004

- 2004 St. Patrick
- 2004 Ernest Shackleton
- 2004 William Butler Yeats
- 2004 George Bernard Shaw
- 2004 Samuel Beckett
- 2004 Séamus Heaney
- 2004 Patrick Kavanagh
- 2004 George Fox

== 2005–2010 ==
Section source:

2005

- William Rowan Hamilton
- Albert Einstein
- Erskine H. Childers
- Pádraig Harrington – Ryder Cup
- Darren Clarke – Ryder Cup
- Paul McGinley – Ryder Cup
- Éamonn Darcy – Ryder Cup
- Philip Walton – Ryder Cup
- Christy O'Connor Jnr – Ryder Cup
- Ronan Rafferty – Ryder Cup
- Harry Bradshaw – Ryder Cup
- Christy O'Connor Snr – Ryder Cup
- Arthur Griffith

2006

- Paddy "the Cope" Gallagher
- Harry Clarke
- Máirtín Ó Cadhain
- Johann Caspar Zeuss
- Ronnie Delany
- Michael Cusack
- Michael Davitt
- Gerhard Markson (principal conductor) & RTÉ National Symphony Orchestra
- The Chieftains
- The Clancy Brothers & Tommy Makem
- Altan
- The Dubliners

2007

- Luke Wadding
- Aodh Ó Néill
- Ruaidhrí Ó Domhnaill
- Saint Charles of Mount Argus
- RTÉ Performing Groups
  - RTÉ National Symphony Orchestra
  - RTÉ Vanbrugh Quartet
  - RTÉ Concert Orchestra
  - RTÉ Cór na nÓg
  - RTÉ Philharmonic Choir
- Coláiste Íosagáin Girls Choir
- Paul O'Connell
- Irish Rugby Team
- Fr. Joseph Mullooly
- James Fintan Lalor
- Charles Wesley

2008

- Liam Whelan
- Saint Patrick
- Hugh Lane
- Lt. Col. Justin McCarthy – Irish UN peacekeeper
- Comdt. Malachy Higgins – Irish UN peacekeeper
- Capt. Patrick Lavelle – Irish UN peacekeeper
- Comdt. Gerald Coghlan – Irish UN peacekeeper
- Capt. Ruairí Henderson – Irish UN peacekeeper
- Cillian Murphy
- Bríd Ní Neachtain
- Colm Meaney
- Pat Shortt
- Pádraic Pearse
- Planxty
- Dé Dannan
- The Bothy Band
- The Tulla Céilí Band

2009

- Saint Patrick
- Charles Darwin
- Francis Bacon
- James Larkin
- Anthony Trollope
- Augustine Birrell
- George Frideric Handel
- Wolfgang Amadeus Mozart
- Frédéric Chopin
- Joseph Haydn
- Arthur Guinness
- Brian Friel
- Tom Murphy
- Frank McGuinness

2010

- Máirtín Ó Direáin
- Roderic O'Conor
- Mother Teresa
- Henry Dunant
- The Freshmen
- The Miami Showband
- The Royal Showband
- Drifters Showband
- Shane Barker & Oliver Murphy – (Irish Wheelchair Association)
- Bernardo O'Higgins
- John MacKenna
- Philip Treacy
- Paul Costelloe
- Louise Kennedy
- John Rocha
- Lainey Keogh
- Orla Kiely

== 2011–2015 ==
Section source:

2011

- Cearbhall Ó Dálaigh
- Stephen O'Reilly & David Joyce – Irish Amateur Boxing Association
- Suzann Pettersen & Michelle Wie – Solheim Cup
- Brian O'Nolan Flann O'Brien
- Gay Byrne – 50 Years of Irish Broadcasting
- Emma O'Driscoll – 50 Years of Irish Broadcasting
- Anne Doyle – 50 Years of Irish Broadcasting
- Flann O'Brien

2012

- Fabulous Beast – Contemporary Arts: Dance
- Irish Modern Dance Theatre – Contemporary Arts: Dance
- Dance Theatre of Ireland – Contemporary Arts: Dance
- CoisCéim – Contemporary Arts: Dance
- Thomas Andrews – RMS Titanic shipbuilder
- Edward J. Smith – RMS Titanic captain
- Father Francis Browne – Irish photographer on RMS Titanic
- The unsinkable Molly Brown – RMS Titanic survivor
- Bram Stoker
- Robert Boyle
- Hannah Mahony – Barnardo's

2013

- Lucia Reynolds & Kathy Hardiman – St Patrick's Day parade
- John F. Kennedy & Mary Anne Ryan (Kennedy's second cousin)
- John F. Kennedy, Seán Lemass & Cmdt. Pat Daly
- Jim Larkin, James Connolly, Countess Markiewicz
- Garda Dongdong Zheng – Integrated Society issue
- Sammy Akorede – Integrated Society issue
- Christian Tshibangu – Integrated Society issue
- Anna Gąciarz – Integrated Society issue
- Group of Irish Volunteers from Waterford

2014

- Irish Citizen Army
- Brendan Behan
- John Redmond
- Edward Carson
- Séamus Heaney
- Thomas Davis
- Paris Curtis

2015

- Seán Lemass
- Terence O'Neill
- William Butler Yeats
- Pádraic Pearse
- St Columbán

== 2016–2020 ==
Section source:

=== 2016 Easter Rising centenary definitives ===
- Thomas J. Clarke
- Seán Mac Diarmada
- Éamonn Ceannt
- Thomas MacDonagh
- Pádraic Pearse
- Joseph Plunkett
- James Connolly
- Constable James O’Brien
- Seán Connolly
- Lieutenant Michael Malone
- Sergeant William Malone
- Kathleen Lynn
- Elizabeth O’Farrell
- Jack Doyle
- Tom McGrath
- Seán Foster
- Louisa Nolan
- Sir Francis Fletcher-Vane
- Francis Sheehy-Skeffington
- Roger Casement

2016

- St Patrick
- Charles Gavan Duffy

2017

- Thomas Francis Meagher
- Niamh Briggs
- Francis Ledwidge
- Jack Lynch
- Lauren Dench & Michael Duke
- Che Guevara

2018

- Sir Alfred Chester Beatty
- Shah Jahan
- Mary, mother of Jesus
- Saint Anne
- Saint Patrick
- John Redmond
- Martin Luther King Jr.
- Nelson Mandela
- Saint Kevin of Glendalough
- Pope Francis
- Hanna Sheehy-Skeffington
- Éamon de Valera

2019

- Noel Hogan
- Fergal Lawler
- Mike Hogan
- Iris Murdoch, birth centenary
- Neil Armstrong, astronaut
- Cady Coleman, astronaut
- Eileen Collins, astronaut
- Michael Collins, astronaut
- Dolores O'Riordan
- Luke Kelly
- John McCormack
- Bono
- The Edge
- Adam Clayton
- Larry Mullen Jr.
- Joe Schmidt
- Johnny Sexton

2020

- Carmel Snow
- Maureen O'Hara
- Lilian Bland
- Maeve Kyle
- Sarah Purser
- Kathleen Lonsdale
- Richard Harris
- Patrick Sarsfield Gilmore
- Edna O’Brien
- Fr. Michael Kelly
- Mary Elmes
- Liam Cosgrave
- Gerald of Wales

== 2021–25 ==
Section source:

2021

- Jane Wilde
- Tom Crean
- Hozier
- Christy Moore
- Sinéad O'Connor
- Lisa Hannigan

2022

- Neil Jordan
- Brenda Fricker
- Daniel Day-Lewis
- Glen Hansard
- Markéta Irglová
- Martin McDonagh

2023

- Jennie Wyse Power
- Thekla Beere
- Mary Robinson
- Susan Denham
- Philomena Begley
- Nathan Carter
- Cliona Hagan
- Daniel O'Donnell
- Big Tom
- Patrick Hillery

2024

- Austin Clarke

== See also ==
- Irish topics
- Postage stamps of Ireland

== References and sources ==
Notes

Sources

- Buchalter, M. Don (1972). Buchalter, M. Don (ed.). Hibernian Specialised Catalogue of the Postage Stamps of Ireland 1922–1972. Hibernian Stamp Co Ltd, Dublin, Ireland.
- Feldman, David (1968). Handbook of Irish Philately. Dublin, Ireland: David Feldman Ltd & the Dolman Press Ltd.
- Gibbons, Edward Stanley (2004). Stanley Gibbons Stamp Catalogue Ireland (2nd ed.). London & Ringwood: Stanley Gibbons. pp. 30–31. ISBN 0-85259-583-2.
- Hamilton-Bowen, Roy (2001). Roy Hamilton-Bowen (ed.). Hibernian Handbook and Catalogue of the Postage Stamps of Ireland 1922–2001. Rodgau Philatelic Service GmbH, Rodgau, Germany. ISBN 3-9807973-0-9.
- Miller, Liam (1983). Kane, William (ed.). Postage Stamps of Ireland 1922–1982. Dublin, Ireland: Philatelic Section, Department of Posts and Telegraphs. ISBN 0-946521-01-8.
