= Chamber Choir Ireland =

Republic of Ireland's national choral ensemble

- Established: 1996
- Founders: Karina Lundstrom; Colin Mawby
- Location: Dublin, Ireland
- Artistic Director: Gabriel Crouch
- Website: chamberchoirireland.com
- Formerly called: National Chamber Choir of Ireland

Chamber Choir Ireland, formerly known as the National Chamber Choir of Ireland, is the Republic of Ireland's national choral ensemble and national chamber choir, and the only regularly funded professional choir in the country. Primarily funded by the Arts Council of Ireland, the choir is a resident ensemble at the National Concert Hall and Associate Artists to Dublin City University. In June 2025, Chamber Choir Ireland announced the appointment of Gabriel Crouch as its Artistic Director and Principal Conductor, with his tenure commencing in January 2026.

The choir's repertoire spans from early Renaissance music to the present day. It commissions new works by contemporary composers. In addition to its performances in Ireland and international tours, the choir has released recordings on the Naxos, Harmonia Mundi, Orchid Classics, RTÉ Lyric FM, and Louth Contemporary Music Society labels.

Chamber Choir Ireland is a member of the European network of professional chamber choirs, TENSO.

== Artistic directors ==
- Gabriel Crouch (2026–present)
- Paul Hillier (2008–2024)
- Celso Antunes (2002–2007)
- Colin Mawby, founding Artistic Director (1991–2001)

The Choir also regularly invites international guest conductors to work with the group, and since 2016 has worked with Sofi Jeannin, Eamonn Dougan, Benjamin Goodson, Krista Audere, Grete Pedersen, Ellie Slorach, Andrew Synnott, Heide Müller, Owain Park, Nicolas Fink, Zoltán Pad, Bernie Sherlock, Nils Schweckendiek and Jörg Widmann.

== Commissions ==
Since its inception, Chamber Choir Ireland has regularly commissioned choral work by both Irish and international composers including:

- Gerald Barry
- Linda Catlin Smith
- Siobhán Cleary
- Francisco del Pino
- Eoghan Desmond
- Amanda Feery
- David Fennessy
- Andrew Hamilton
- Gabriel Jackson
- Áine Mallon
- Deirdre McKay
- Stephen McNeff
- Cassandra Miller
- Emma O'Halloran
- Tarik O'Regan
- Caroline Shaw
- Jennifer Walshe
- Ian Wilson

== Touring ==
Chamber Choir Ireland regularly tours throughout the island of Ireland, presenting choral concerts to audiences all around the country. Internationally, the Choir has toured extensively in Europe, Asia and North and South America including performances at the White House for President Barack Obama on St Patrick's Day 2011.

== Learning & Participation ==
Chamber Choir Ireland has developed learning and participation programmes across the choral art form:

- Composers in the Classroom—a youth arts programme which supports secondary school students in Ireland and Northern Ireland to compose their own pieces of choral music
- Axis SING—a from-scratch community choir project in Ballymun, North County Dublin
- Choral Music in Ireland: History and Evolution—a series of lectures on the history of choral music in Ireland
- Choral Sketches—a professional development programme which equips composers with the skills to write for choir
- Choral Clinics—bespoke workshops for amateur and community choirs across Ireland
- The CCI Studio—a professional development programme designed to provide training and professional experience to emerging choral singers.

== Funding ==
Principal funding for Chamber Choir Ireland comes from the Arts Council /an Chomhairle Ealaíon, with additional support from the Arts Council of Northern Ireland National Lottery Fund, and Dublin City Council.

== Recordings ==
The choir's releases include:

- Gerard Victory: Ultima Rerum – Virginia Kerr (soprano), Bernadette Greevy (mezzo-soprano), Adrian Thompson (tenor), Alan Opie (baritone), RTÉ Philharmonic Choir, National Chamber Choir of Ireland, Cór na nÓg (children's choir), National Symphony Orchestra of Ireland, Colman Pearce (conductor). CD, 1994. Label: Naxos/Marco Polo.
- White Stones – Secret Garden (ensemble), National Chamber Choir of Ireland, RTÉ Concert Orchestra, Fiachra Trench (conductor). CD, 1997. Label: Philips
- One day fine (Irish choral music from the 14th to 21st centuries) – National Chamber Choir of Ireland, Paul Hillier (conductor). CD, 2011. Label: RTÉ Lyric FM
- Tarik O'Regan: Acallam na senórach: an Irish colloquy – National Chamber Choir of Ireland, Stewart French (guitar), Paul Hillier (conductor). CD, 2011. Label: Harmonia Mundi
- Carols from the Old and New Worlds, Vol. 3 – Chamber Choir Ireland, Fergal Caulfield (chamber organ), Paul Hillier (conductor). CD, 2014. Label: Harmonia Mundi.
- Choirland: an anthology of Irish choral music (scores for 15 pieces by Irish composers for unaccompanied mixed choir with accompanying CD) – National Chamber Choir of Ireland, Paul Hillier (conductor). CD, 2014. Publisher: Contemporary Music Centre (Dublin)
- Barry Meets Beethoven (works by Gerald Barry) – Stephen Richardson (bass), Chamber Choir Ireland, Crash Ensemble, Paul Hillier (conductor). CD, 2016. Label: Orchid Classics
- Letters (featuring A Letter of Rights by Tarik O'Regan and Alice Goodman; and David Fennessy's Triptych, a set of three pieces commissioned by Chamber Choir Ireland) — Chamber Choir Ireland, Irish Chamber Orchestra, Paul Hillier (conductor). CD, 2020. Label: Naxos Denmark.
- Folks' Music (featuring Folio by Linda Catlin Smith and The City, Full of People by Cassandra Miller) — Chamber Choir Ireland, Paul Hillier (conductor), Esposito Quartet. Digital Release, 2023. Label: Louth Contemporary Music Society, Ireland.
- Gabriel Fauré: Prométhée (excerpts) — Rosique, Erraught, Dran, Ireland National Symphony, Chamber Choir Ireland, Tingaud. CD, 2025. Label: Naxos.
- Gabriel Fauré: Caligula — Rosique, Chamber Choir Ireland, Ireland National Symphony, Tingaud. CD, 2025. Label: Naxos.
