= David Brophy (conductor) =

Irish conductor

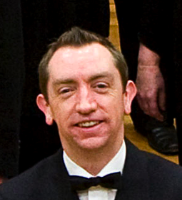
- David Brophy

Background information
- Origin: Dublin, Ireland
- Occupation: Conductor

David Brophy (born 24 March 1972) is an Irish conductor.

== Biography ==
David Brophy was born in Santry, Dublin. He studied in Ireland – gaining a Bachelor of Music (Performance) degree from Trinity College Dublin and Dublin Institute of Technology College of Music in 1995 – as well as in England and Holland. During 1997–2001 he took private conducting lessons with Gerhard Markson. He has conducted the National Chamber Choir of Ireland, the Dublin Orchestral Players, and the RTÉ National Symphony Orchestra, before being appointed Principal Conductor of the RTÉ Concert Orchestra (RTÉCO). His career, while primarily based in Ireland, has brought him to many parts of Europe, Africa, America and Canada. While conducting the RTÉ NSO, he performed in front of over 80,000 people at the opening ceremony of The Special Olympics World Games in 2003. The event, televised worldwide, included performances with U2 and the largest Riverdance troupe ever assembled. Radio broadcasts have been carried on RTÉ, BBC, CBC Television (Canada) and EBU to listeners across Europe, while his recordings have been released on Silva Screen and Tara Records labels. His TV appearances include The National Concert Hall's 25th anniversary gala concert entitled Ireland's Finest. As Principal Conductor of the RTÉCO Brophy conducted the orchestra in front of Queen Elizabeth II at The Convention Centre Dublin on her state visit to Ireland in May 2011.

Brophy has directed premieres of works by leading contemporary Irish composers including Frank Corcoran, Raymond Deane, Benjamin Dwyer, David Fennessy, and Ian Wilson. he also gave the first Irish performances of Steve Reich's Music for 18 Musicians and the Irish premiere of André Previn's A Streetcar Named Desire.

Brophy gave the World Premier of double Grammy-winning Argentinian Composer Claudia Montero's piano concerto "Concierto en Blanco y Negro" at the Galway International Arts Festival and the National Concert Hall, Dublin in July 2017.

Film credits include Shaun Davey's score for The Abduction Club. He also presented a reality TV show on RTÉ One entitled "Instrumental", charting the attempts of celebrities to learn to play musical instruments.

== See also ==
- RTÉ Performing Groups
