= RTÉ Performing Groups =

Irish classical orchestra groups

Background information
- Also known as: RTÉ Orchestras, Quartet & Choirs
- Origin: Dublin, Cork
- Genres: Classical, Choral, Symphonic, Jazz, Operatic, Contemporary
- Occupation(s): Orchestra, choir, string quartet
- Years active: 1948–present
- Labels: Naxos Records
- Members: RTÉ Concert Orchestra
- Past members: RTÉ National Symphony Orchestra; RTÉ Philharmonic Choir; RTÉ Cór na nÓg; ConTempo Quartet; RTÉ Vanbrugh Quartet
- Website: orchestras.rte.ie

RTÉ Performing Groups was a performance group, operating over many decades, of five classical ensembles that were part of the Irish broadcaster Raidió Teilifís Éireann (RTÉ). All but the string quartet (originally the Vanbrugh Quartet, the ConTempo Quartet from 2013) are based in Dublin (the ConTempo had a Galway base, Vanbrugh were based in Cork). In January 2022, three of the member groups were moved from RTÉ to the aegis of the National Concert Hall by the Irish government. RTÉ continues to host the RTÉ Concert Orchestra.

== Structure ==
The RTÉ Performing Groups were made up of the RTÉ National Symphony Orchestra, the RTÉ Concert Orchestra, a string quartet (under contract the ConTempo Quartet, previously the RTÉ Vanbrugh Quartet), the RTÉ Philharmonic Choir and the children's choir, RTÉ Cór na nÓg, until January 2022. The five groups presented over 250 events annually, including live performances and work in education. The groups were largely funded by licence fee revenue and reported a 2018 income of €15 million. In 2018, the two orchestras celebrated 70 years in existence.

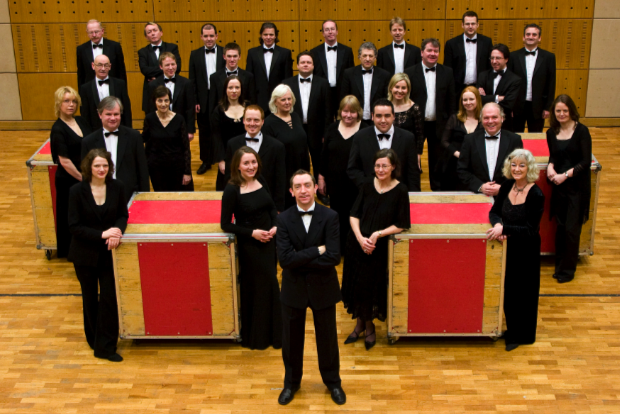
The RTÉ Concert Orchestra, with conductor David Brophy.

Between the RTÉ National Symphony Orchestra and the RTÉ Concert Orchestra, a total of 134 professional musicians are employed. The RTÉ Philharmonic Choir and the children's choir, RTÉ Cór na nÓg, are for singers at an amateur level. Presently, approximately 200 adults and children are incorporated in the choirs.

The five groups play approximately two concerts a week, a number which can increase at certain times of year, and present up to 250 events every year, most of these being live concerts. Most of these performances take place in Dublin, mostly in the National Concert Hall but some in The Helix and the National Gallery of Ireland. There is a variety of high-end classical music with the RTÉ National Symphony Orchestra and the RTÉ Vanbrugh Quartet to RTÉ Concert Orchestra concerts in the fields of jazz and big band, classical crossover, rock music, Irish traditional music, cabaret, multimedia events, family concerts and more.

High-profile Irish and international artists who have appeared with the RTÉ National Symphony Orchestra include Han-Na Chang, Louis Lortie and Ann Murray, while acclaimed guests in the orchestra's history included Sir John Barbirolli, Vladimir Ashkenazy, Joan Sutherland and Mstislav Rostropovich. RTÉ Concert Orchestra guests have included Luciano Pavarotti, Plácido Domingo, José Carreras and Kiri Te Kanawa, and more recently Cleo Laine and John Dankworth, Duke Special, Ute Lemper and Katherine Jenkins.

In 2007, all groups featured on a stamp. One million stamps were printed.

== Groups with RTÉ ==
=== RTÉ Concert Orchestra ===
The RTÉ Concert Orchestra is the other of the two full-time professional orchestras in Ireland that are part of RTÉ. Since its formation as the Radio Éireann Light Orchestra in 1948, the RTÉ Concert Orchestra has grown from a small studio-based recording group to become an active 45-strong orchestra performing over eighty concerts annually.

== Groups now with the NCH ==
=== National Symphony Orchestra ===
The RTÉ National Symphony Orchestra is the concert music orchestra of Radio Telefís Éireann. It has been considered one of Europe's major symphony orchestras. It is the primary symphony orchestra of Dublin and is the leading orchestra of Ireland. Jaime Martín is the Chief Conductor.

=== RTÉ Philharmonic Choir ===
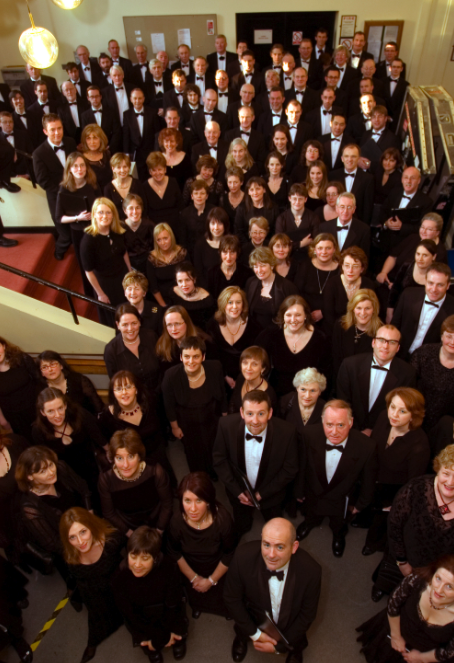
The RTÉ Philharmonic Choir

The RTÉ Philharmonic Choir is RTÉ's main choir. The Choir has been at the centre of choral music in Ireland since its foundation by Colin Mawby in 1985 following the introduction of new choral policy. This 140-strong choir is the country's premier symphonic choral ensemble and has performed more than 52 of the major choral works since its foundation, mostly in conjunction with the RTÉ orchestras. Its conductor is Mark Hindley.

=== RTÉ Cór na nÓg ===
The RTÉ Cór na nÓg was founded in 1987 and consists of 65 specially-selected children between the ages of 9 and 14 directed by conductor Máire Mannion. Regular performances are made in Dublin (such as the National Concert Hall) and in other counties.

== Other groups ==
=== RTÉ ConTempo Quartet ===
RTÉ ConTempo Quartet (Bogdan Sofei, Ingrid Nicola – violins; Andreea Banciu – viola; Adrian Mantu – cello) was the resident string quartet to RTÉ from 2013 to 2022, and are Ensemble in residence to The Galway Music Residency since 2003, and former the Quartet in Residence to Royal Academy of Music, London. The RTÉ ConTempo Quartet won a world record of 14 International Prizes including London International String Quartet Competition and is one of Europe's most successful quartets, internationally recognised for its beauty of sound, clarity of texture and integrity of interpretation within an unusually wide and varied range of repertoire.
