= Mark Duley =

- Origin: Napier, New Zealand
- Occupations: Conductor, organist
- Formerly of: RTÉ Philharmonic Choir

Mark Duley is a choral director and organist from New Zealand. He was the chorus master of the RTÉ Philharmonic Choir.

== Biography ==
Duley is a first class honours graduate of Auckland University. Post-graduate studies in organ brought him to the North German Organ Academy and to the Sweelinck Conservatorium in Amsterdam, where he was a pupil of Jacques van Oortmerssen. He then worked for time in England and was organist of Christ's Hospital, before moving to Dublin in 1992 to take up the post of organist and director of music at Christ Church Cathedral. During his eleven years there, the cathedral gained an international reputation for its music. He directed the choir on many CD recordings, broadcasts on the RTÉ, BBC and EBU networks, and on tours to the UK, France, Germany, Slovenia, Croatia and New Zealand. He is the artistic director of the Irish Baroque Orchestra, which he founded with Thérèse Timoney in 1996.

== RTÉ Philharmonic Choir ==
Duley was the chorus master of the RTÉ Philharmonic Choir for fifteen years, standing down in 2011. He has worked with the RTÉ National Symphony Orchestra and RTÉ Concert Orchestra both as chorus master and organist. Other work with Irish choral ensembles and festivals include the National Chamber Choir of Ireland, Opera Theatre Company and the Wexford Festival Opera.

== Resurgam ==
Duley founded his professional chamber choir, Resurgam, in 2003. It is based in Dublin and is acknowledged to be one of the country's finest choirs. A particular feature of the choir's work is the presentation of the great sacred repertoire of the Renaissance and Baroque periods, frequently in partnership with Irish Baroque Orchestra, with whom the group enjoys a special and ongoing relationship.

Resurgam has performed in many venues throughout Ireland and also in the UK, and has appeared at several major Irish festivals, including the Cork International Choral Festival, Ardee Baroque and the Galway Early Music Festival. The choir has worked with many internationally renowned conductors, including Professor John Butt, Christophe Rousset, Robert Howarth, Laurence Cummings, Christian Curnyn and Gary Cooper, as well as its own founder-director Mark Duley.

Projects include performances of Alfred Schnittke's Choir Concerto at Dublin City Hall (May 2011), de Mondonville's Grands Motets and Handel's Dixit Dominus with Irish Baroque Orchestra directed by Christophe Rousset (August 2011) and Songs of Farewell, a four-date tour of the West Coast of Ireland (October 2011).

== Pipeworks ==
Duley is artistic director of Pipeworks (formerly the Dublin International Organ & Choral Festival). He took up the position for the 2002 festival. His artistic directorship has been notable for strong artistic programming, opening up the organ to wider audiences (providing improvised live soundtracks to silent films for example), developing the Dublin International Organ Competition and raising awareness of Ireland's organ heritage.
