= Artemis Fowl (soundtrack) =

Artemis Fowl (Original Soundtrack)

Film score by Patrick Doyle
- Released: June 12, 2020
- Recorded: 2019–2020
- Genre: Film score
- Length: 57:59
- Label: Walt Disney

Patrick Doyle chronology
All Is True (2018)	Artemis Fowl (2020)	Death on the Nile (2022)

Artemis Fowl (Original Soundtrack) is the score album to the 2020 film of the same name, directed by Kenneth Branagh and featured musical score composed by Branagh's regular collaborator and Scottish composer Patrick Doyle. The film score was released on June 12, 2020, by Walt Disney Records featuring 28 tracks.

== Development ==
The film marked Branagh's 14th collaboration with Patrick Doyle, who composed the score during the 2019–2020 period. He orchestrated the score with the Irish-based RTÉ National Symphony Orchestra and RTÉ Philharmonic Choir, conducted by James Shearman with recording happened at the Air Studios in London. Fiddle player Zoë Conway had worked on the film's music, had praised Doyle's opening piece wrote for her for the film, saying "While I was there, the Scottish composer Patrick Doyle wrote a whole beautiful piece for me to play for the opening sequel - it was just so magical."

== Reception ==
Although the film received negative reviews, the score composed by Doyle, received praise from critics. According to music critic, Jonathan Broxton, the score "[it] has a few of the little touches and flourishes we have associated with Doyle's writing for decades, and it has all the multi-thematic intellectualism he always brings to his scores, but it is most certainly a contemporary piece, with all the connotations that description brings. The main themes are lovely, especially the Father & Son theme and Domovoi's Theme. The Irish influences are handled deftly, and a great deal of the action music is terrific. However, it is the electronic and synth elements that are likely to be make or break: Doyle traditionalists may consider them too intrusive and too un-Doyle like, while others who previously found his purely orchestral work too old fashioned may find that they are the things that make them finally connect with his work. Either way, Artemis Fowl a score definitely worth exploring, as it is much likely to be better-received and longer-remembered than the film itself." Anton Smit of Soundtrack World praised Doyle's ability to produce "beautiful melodies, sequences and themes, as can be heard in this score" saying "This album does not make it to the top of my list of Patrick Doyle scores, but it is still a wonderful soundtrack worth exploring."

James Southall of Movie Wave wrote "The highlights of Artemis Fowl are so strong that we can forgive the album for sagging in the middle. I'm not sure this is really where Doyle's naturally at his best – it is telling that most of the highlights are where he pushes the emotional side of thing – but he's more than capable of handling this type of film. His collaboration with Kenneth Branagh has produced such strong scores that I doubt this one will figure that highly on anyone's lists, but that's more a reflection of how good most of them are rather than there being much wrong with this one." Filmtracks.com wrote "Artemis Fowl is a likeable score with few obnoxious moments. The immensity of its fantasy portions and the intimacy of the lyrical passages offer countless highlights for the Doyle enthusiast. In fact, there's more to like with each listen. But the whole mass of disparate styles and themes simply doesn't work as a cohesive presentation. Doyle sometimes has a habit of writing a few substantial and memorable highlights in otherwise pleasantly average scores, and Artemis Fowl plays like a version of that habit on steroids, the highlights aplenty and well worth your time but the score still suffering from an identity problem in sum. Despite Disney's hope that this concept would span a franchise of films, Doyle provided absolutely nothing memorable for a general audience to recall in future films. One could argue that the production hell that occupied this movie for a long time is partly responsible for the "score to the moment" approach from Doyle, and that's fair."

Donagh Broderick of The Heights wrote "Artemis Fowl's soundtrack also helps elevate the film. Patrick Doyle's spectacular score reworks traditional Irish music with modern panache." Though criticising the film, Emmet Asher-Perrin of Tor.com said "the score keeps trying to convince you that the events you're witnessing are something truly epic". The Cinema Spot's criticised Doyle's music as "distracting" and said "the music doesn't match the tone very well".

== Track listing ==
No.	Title	Length
1.	"Father and Son"	3:44
2.	"Talented Tunneller"	2:45
3.	"Surfing"	1:37
4.	"Therapy"	1:43
5.	"Time to Believe"	2:26
6.	"Haven City"	1:58
7.	"Commander Root"	1:28
8.	"You're Not Going"	1:36
9.	"Do Not Engage"	1:34
10.	"To the Surface"	2:24
11.	"Containment"	2:03
12.	"Full Scale Recovery"	1:41
13.	"Battle Stations"	3:39
14.	"Fairy Fight"	1:03
15.	"Negotiation"	1:07
16.	"The Artist"	1:08
17.	"We Meet Again"	1:38
18.	"Beechwood Short"	1:01
19.	"The Aculos"	2:08
20.	"New Recruit"	1:54
21.	"Troll Fight"	2:21
22.	"The Fatal Blow"	2:08
23.	"Collapse"	2:28
24.	"Fairy Dust"	1:45
25.	"Bring Him Back"	2:12
26.	"A Dear Friend"	2:58
27.	"Worth Fighting For"	2:36
28.	"That's My Ride"	2:54
Total length:		57:59

== Additional music ==
The non-album songs that featured in the film, include: "I Want to Know What Love Is" by Foreigner and Gianni Schicchi's "O mio babbino caro" written by Giacomo Puccini, Giovacchino Forzano and performed by Angela Gheorghiu. The Radiohead single "Decks Dark" soundtracked the teaser trailer, released in November 2018 and was not featured in the film.

== Personnel ==
Credits adapted from AllMusic.

- Ashley Andrew-Jones – assistant engineer
- Laurence Anslow – recording
- Richard Armstrong – editing
- Zoë Conway – fiddle
- Abigail Doyle – vocals
- Patrick Doyle – composer, producer, piano
- Robyn McKay – whistle
- Maggie Rodford – musical producer
- James Shearman – conductor
- Nick Taylor – mixing, recording
- Will Temlett – programming
- Olly Thompson – assistant engineer
- Cécile de Tournesac – editing
