= Gerard Victory =

Irish composer (1921–1995)

- Born: Thomas Gerard Joseph Victory; 24 December 1921
- Origin: Dublin, Ireland
- Died: 14 March 1995 (aged 73) Dublin, Ireland
- Occupation: Composer

Thomas Joseph Gerard Victory (24 December 1921 – 14 March 1995) was a prolific Irish composer. He wrote over two hundred works across many genres and styles, including tonal, serial, aleatoric and electroacoustic music.

== Biography ==
Victory was born in Dublin, Ireland, in 1921 the son of a shopkeeper Thomas Victory and his wife, Delia (née Irwin). After schooling, he read Celtic Studies at University College Dublin and Music at Trinity College Dublin, earning a doctorate in 1972.

In April 1948 Victory married Geraldine Herity, and they had five children: Alma, Fiona, Isolde, Raymond, and Alan. Victory died in Dublin on 14 March 1995, aged 73. His papers are held in Trinity College and the Contemporary Music Centre holds a number of his scores.

== Career ==
In terms of composition, Victory was mostly self-taught, although he received some formal training from John F. Larchet, Alan Rawsthorne and Walter Beckett. He also attended the Darmstadt International Summer Courses for New Music in Darmstadt, Germany.

In 1948 he was joint composer of music for a song in a play by Irish playwright Teresa Deevy called Light Falling, this was performed by the Abbey Experimental Theatre Company in the Peacock Theatre, Dublin. His work was also part of the music event in the art competition at the 1948 Summer Olympics.

Victory's career was primarily in music administration, serving as director of music for Ireland's national broadcasting station RTÉ from 1967 to 1982. He was a president of UNESCO's International Rostrum of Composers, a fellow of the Royal Irish Academy of Music and a recipient of the French Ordre des Arts et des Lettres and the German Bundesverdienstkreuz.

== Legacy ==
The Gerard Victory Commission, a prize named in his honour, is awarded to the most promising individual composer.

== Selected works ==
=== Orchestral ===
1991	Eblana	45'
1988	Symphony No. 4	21'
1984	Symphony No. 3	40'
1982	Five Inventions	14'
1981	Six Epiphanies of the Author	30'
1980	Three Irish Pictures	12'
1973	From Renoir's Workshop	18'
1970	Cyrano de Bergerac Overture	7'
1966	Favola di Notte	13'

=== Ensemble ===
1990	Moresca	violin, cello, harp	9'
1985	Commedia	2 trumpets, horn, trombone, tuba	13'
1982	String Trio	violin, viola, cello	22'

=== Solo piano ===
1979	Verona Preludes	22'
1966	Cinque Correlazioni	10'
1965	Three Masks	9'
1962	Prelude and Toccata	8'

=== Vocal ===
1994	The Wooing of Éadaoin	children's opera	20'
1991	Responsibilities	SATB choir	13'
1991	Seasons of Eros	baritone, piano	25'
1989	The Rendezvous	soloists, orchestra	60'
1984	Songs from Lyonnesse	SATB choir	23'
1978	Seven Songs of Experience	soloists, SATB choir	23'
1975–1981	Ultima Rerum	soloists, two choirs, orchestra	82'
1975	Cinq Chansons de Rimbaud	soprano, piano	18'
1970	The Magic Trumpet	speaker, ensemble	15'
1968	Civitas Nova	soloists, SATB choir, organ	12'
1967	Kriegslieder	tenor, SATB choir, trumpet, percussion	14'
1962	Le Petit Cerf	soprano, SATB choir	6'

=== Operas ===
1972	Eloise and Abelard	opera
1970	Chatterton	opera
1964	The Music hath Mischief	opera
1956	Iomrall Aithne	opera
1953	An fear a phós balbhán	opera
1949	Once upon a Moon	opera
1944	Nita	opera

=== Band ===
1985	Marche Bizarre	3'

=== Mixed media ===
1973–1975	Processus	mixed choir, brass, percussion, pianos, tape	14'

== Recordings ==
- Three Irish Pictures, performed by RTÉ Sinfonietta, Proinseas Ó Duinn (cond.), on Marco Polo 8.223804 (CD, 1996).
- Ultima Rerum, performed by Virginia Kerr (S), Bernadette Greevy (Mez), Adrian Thompson (T), Alan Opie (Bar), RTÉ Philharmonic Choir, National Chamber Choir, Cór na nÓg, National Symphony Orchestra of Ireland, Colman Pearce (cond.), on: Marco Polo 8.223532-3 (CD, 1997).
- An Old Woman of the Roads, performed by Bernadette Greevy (Mez) and Hugh Tinney (pf), on: Marco Polo 8.225098 (CD, 1998).
- Revel in Reel Time, performed by RTÉ Concert Orchestra, on: Celtic Collections CCD 135 (CD, 1999).
- Songs from Lyonnesse, performed by National Chamber Choir of Ireland, Colin Mawby (cond.), on: Black Box BBM 1030 (CD, 2000).
- Moresca, performed by Geraldine O'Doherty (hp), David O'Doherty (vn), and Moya O'Grady (vc), on: Absolute Music [no label code] (CD, 2009).
- Prelude and Toccata, performed by Hugh Tinney, on: RTÉ lyric fm CD 153] (CD, 2016).
