= Raymond Deane =

Irish composer (born 1953)

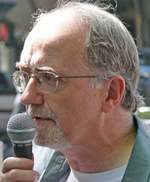

Raymond Deane (born 27 January 1953) is an Irish composer.

== Biography ==
Deane was born in Tuam, County Galway and brought up on Achill Island, County Mayo. From 1963 he lived in Dublin, where initially he studied the piano at the then College of Music with Fionn Ó Lochlainn. He studied at University College Dublin, graduating in 1974, and became a founding member of the Association of Young Irish Composers, a predecessor of today's Association of Irish Composers. He won a number of awards as a pianist. In 1974, Deane won a scholarship to study with Gerald Bennett at the Musikakademie in Basle, Switzerland. He moved on to Cologne as a student of Mauricio Kagel but was persuaded to change to studying with Karlheinz Stockhausen, which Deane abandoned after six months "due to Stockhausen's lack of engagement with his students at this period". With a DAAD scholarship, Deane continued his studies with Isang Yun in Berlin.

In the 1991 Accents Festival in Dublin, he was the featured composer (with Kurtág), also at the 1999 Sligo New Music Festival (with Roger Doyle). He represented Ireland in several ISCM festivals (Mexico City, Manchester, Hong Kong), and works were performed at the festivals l'Imaginaire irlandais (Paris 1996), Voyages (Montreal 2002), Warsaw Autumn (2004), and more than once at the UNESCO International Rostrum of Composers (his Ripieno for orchestra winning a special prize in 2000). He was also the artistic director of the first two RTÉ Living Music Festivals (Dublin 2002 and 2004), showcasing the music of Luciano Berio and contemporary French music respectively. In 2010, a portrait concert of his chamber music took place at the Southbank Centre, London.

Deane was awarded a Doctorate in Composition by Maynooth University in 2005. He has been a member of Aosdána, the Irish state-supported academy of creative artists, since 1986.

Besides his music, Raymond Deane is known for his social commitment and human rights activism, particularly for the Ireland–Palestine Solidarity Campaign, which he co-founded in 2001, and the Irish Anti-War Movement. He cited early experiences of bullying in his childhood as a potential cause of this commitment: "[...] I have internalised the certainty that this bullying was a defining factor in my personal growth, eventually leading to my sporadic activism on behalf of the downtrodden".

Deane has always been active as a writer of essays and a critic of music, having published in Irish journals such as "In Dublin", "Soundpost", the "Journal of Music in Ireland" and in some academic books. In 1991, he published a mock-Gothic novel called Death of a Medium. He also wrote an autobiography, covering the years up to about 1987, which was published in 2014 (see Bibliography).

Since 2022, Deane's music has been published by Universal Edition, with his earlier pieces gradually being added to the catalogue.

== Music ==
Raymond Deane is "one of the most prominent figures in contemporary Irish composition". His work can be divided into three phases, one ending in 1974 before his studies abroad, the second ending in 1988 – a period he described as "a process of learning, assimilating and overcoming that assimilation – and the period since then, which has been described as a "re-gathering" Several works of his middle phase are consciously constructed in a technical manner to avoid the trend towards neo-romanticism that he perceived among many of his contemporaries. According to Fitzgerald, "Deane strives to achieve a dialectical drama without regressing to nineteenth-century norms of developmentalism. The result is a heterogeneous and impure dramatic discourse." Zuk wrote, "Even at first hearing, it is evident that his work is a product of a highly reflective mind, being for the most part intensely serious in tone, though shot through at times with an idiosyncratic humour and on other occasions pervaded by a distinct spirit of playfulness".

== Selected works ==
The following list is based on Zuk (2006; see Bibliography), p. 121-5; more recent ones from CMC profile (see External links).

Operas

- The Poet and His Double (libretto: Raymond Deane; 1991)
- The Wall of Cloud (R. Deane; 1997)
- The Alma Fetish (Gavin Kostick; 2012)
- Vagabones (Renate Debrun after Emma Donoghue's radio play Trespasses; 2019)

Orchestral (for large orchestra, if not otherwise mentioned)

- Embers (1973) for string orchestra
- Enchaînement (1982)
- de/montage (1984)
- Thresholds (1987, rev. 1991)
- Quaternion (1988) for piano and orchestra
- Krespel's Concerto (1990) for violin and orchestra
- Catenae (1991)
- Oboe Concerto (1994)
- Dekatriad (1995)
- Five Piece Suite (1999) for string orchestra
- Ripieno (1999)
- Violin Concerto (2003)
- Concursus (2004) for violin, viola and string orchestra
- Samara (2005)
- Hungarian Jewish Melodies (2007) for violin, viola, cello and string orchestra
- A Baroque Session (with Carolan and Friends) (2009) for violin, viola, cello and string orchestra

Chamber music

- Embers (1973) for string quartet
- Lichtzwang (1979) for cello and piano
- Aprèsludes (1979) for flute, cello, clarinet, percussion, harp, viola, cello
- String Quartet I: Silhouettes (1981)
- Seachanges with Danse Macabre (1993) for piccolo, violin, cello, piano and percussion
- Catacombs (1994, rev. 2004) for clarinet, violin, cello, piano
- Moresque (1996) for oboe and percussion
- Marche oublié (1996, rev. 2004) for violin, cello, piano
- String Quartet II: Brown Studies (1998)
- Parthenia Violata (1998) for violin and piano
- Pentacle (2000) for violin and cello
- String Quartet III: Inter pares (2000)
- String Quartet IV: Equali (2001)
- Brève for viola solo (2003)
- Marthiya (2004) for violin, viola, cello
- Venthalia (2007) for flute/alto-fl/piccolo and piano
- Quadripartita (2012) for violin, viola, cello, double bass
- Danse de la terre (2013) for violin, viola, cello
- String Quartet V: Siberia (2013)
- String Quartet VI (2016)
- Scintillae II: Seven Fragments from a Pandemic (2021) for violin and piano

Piano

- Orphica (1970, rev. 1981, 1996)
- Linoi (1973, rev. 1984)
- Piano Sonata No. 1 (1974, rev. 1980)
- Triarchia (1978, rev. 1981)
- Piano Sonata No. 2 (1981)
- Avatars (1982)
- Contretemps (1989) for 2 pianos
- After-Pieces (1990)
- Rahu's Rounds (1998)
- Siris (2006)
- Noctuary (2011)
- Legerdemain (2013)
- Tapestry XIII: The Walling of Ros (2016)
- Raccordement: In memoriam Claude Debussy (2017)
- Scintillae (2021)

Vocal

- Tristia (Emily Dickinson, Paul Celan, Thomas Hardy) (1980) for soprano and ensemble
- Archair (Máirtín Ó Direáin) (1987) for soprano and ensemble
- ... e mi sovvien l'eterno ... (Giacomo Leopardi) (1987) for mixed choir
- November Songs (Patrick Kavanagh) (1990) for mezzo and ensemble
- ... una musica riposa (Mario Luzi) for mezzo, oboe, cello, piano
- Two Songs for Paris (Kevin Hart, Emmanuel Moses) (1995) for mezzo, viola and piano
- So Quiet Now ... (Kevin Hart) (1996) for soprano, viola and piano
- Voices, Receding (Two Songs against War) (Isaac Rosenberg, Wilfred Owen) (2015) for soprano and piano
- Galar an ghrá/The Disease of Love (Maghnus Ó Domhnaill) (2019) for low voice and piano
- 5 Roses in 4 Parts (2021) for mixed choir

Novel

- Death of a Medium (Dublin: Odell & Adair, 1991)

== Recordings ==
Based on Klein (2001), with more recent additions, see external links.

- Avatars, Jimmy Vaughan (piano), on: Goasco GXX003-4 (MC, 1985).
- Dekatriad, Irish Chamber Orchestra, Fionnuala Hunt (cond.), on: Black Box Music BBM 1013 (CD, 1998).
- Quaternion (with Anthony Byrne, piano), Krespel's Concerto (with Alan Smale, violin), Oboe Concerto (with Matthew Manning, oboe), National Symphony Orchestra of Ireland, Colman Pearce (cond.), on: Marco Polo 8.225106 (CD, 1999).
- After-Pieces (with Hugh Tinney, piano), Seachanges (with Danse macabre) and Catacombs (perf. by Ensemble Reservoir, Mikel Toms, cond.), Marche oublié (perf. by Schubert Ensemble of London), String Quartet II: Brown Studies (Vanbrugh Quartet) on: Black Box Music BBM 1014 (CD, 2000).
- Ripieno, Violin Concerto (with Christine Pryn, violin), Samara, RTÉ National Symphony Orchestra, Gerhard Markson (cond.), on: RTÉ CD 274 (CD, 2007).
- Apostille, David Adams (organ), on: Irish Contemporary Organ Music (no label) (CD, 2008).
- Five Piece Suite, Young European Strings Chamber Orchestra, Ronald Masin (cond.), on: Third Edition (no label) (CD, 2011).
- Noctuary Books I and II (= complete), Hugh Tinney (piano), on: Resonus Classics RD CD 01 (CD, 2014) and Resonus Classics RES 10133 (download only, published 2014).
- Embers (orchestral version), performed by RTÉ National Symphony Orchestra, Gerhard Markson (cond.), on: RTÉ lyric fm CD 153 (CD, 2016).
- Embers (string quartet version); Marthiya, performed by Carducci Quartet und Crash Ensemble, on Louth Contemporary Music CGL LCMS 2021 (CD, 2021).

== Bibliography ==
- Axel Klein: Die Musik Irlands im 20. Jahrhundert (Hildesheim: Georg Olms, 1996), ISBN 3-487-10196-3.
- Patrick Zuk: Raymond Deane (Dublin: Field Day Publications, 2006), ISBN 0-946755-29-9.
- Mark Fitzgerald: "Deane, Raymond", in: The Encyclopaedia of Music in Ireland, ed. by Harry White and Barra Boydell (Dublin: UCD Press, 2013), ISBN 978-1-906359-78-2, p. 289–291.
- Raymond Deane: In My Own Light. A Memoir (Dublin: Liffey Press, 2014), ISBN 978-1-908308-57-3.
- Axel Klein: "Selbstfindung durch Musik. Der irische Komponist Raymond Deane", in: Neue Zeitschrift für Musik vol. 176 (2015) no. 4 (July/August), p. 48–50 [in German].
