= Hugh Tinney =

Irish pianist (born 1958)

Hugh Tinney (born 1958) is an Irish pianist.

== Biography ==
Tinney was a pupil at Gonzaga College, Dublin through the 1970s, and studied physics at Trinity College Dublin. In 1983 he won the first prize of the International Ettore Pozzoli Piano Competition in Seregno, Italy, and in 1984, the Paloma O'Shea Santander International Competition in Spain, to which he would return in 1990 as a jury member. He is also a laureate of the 9th Leeds Int. Competition.

He debuted in the 1987 Proms, performing Beethoven's 5th Piano Concerto along with the BBC National Orchestra of Wales. In the course of his UK concert career, he has performed with London's Royal Philharmonic Orchestra, London Philharmonic Orchestra, Philharmonia, London Mozart Players, the City of Birmingham Symphony, the Royal Scottish National Orchestra, the RTÉ National Symphony Orchestra and Dublin's Orchestra of St. Cecilia, with whom he performed Mozart's 21 piano concertos over the years 1995 – 1998. Dublinese highlights of Tinney's solo career include two major recital series at the Irish Museum of Modern Art (1991, 1995) and six recitals on Beethoven's piano sonatas at the Royal Dublin Society (2000–02). His international career includes appearances at Spanish, Czech, Belgian, Finnish, French, Japanese and American festivals.

Throughout his career Tinney has cultivated chamber music, collaborating with the Borodin, Tokyo, Vanbrugh and Vogler String Quartets, as well as musicians such as Finghin Collins, John O'Conor, John Finucane, Carol McGonnell, Bernadette Greevy, Steven Isserlis and Catherine Leonard.

Tinney is a professor at the Royal Irish Academy of Music, and has served as the Music Festival in Great Irish Houses' Artistic Director between 2000-06. In 2007, he was awarded a Doctor of Music (honoris causa) degree by the National University of Ireland.

== Personal life ==
His older sister Eithne Tinney is also a concert pianist, as well as an RTÉ producer, and a director of the Educational Building Society. His mother was the mathematical physicist Sheila Tinney.

== Discography ==
- Ludwig van Beethoven - 5th and 9th Violin Sonatas + Catherine Leonard. RTÉ lyric fm label, 2007.
- Raymond Deane - After-pieces. Black Box.
- Aloys Fleischmann - Piano Quintet + RTÉ Vanbrugh Quartet
- Franz Liszt - Bénédiction de Dieu dans la solitude, Après une lecture du Dante, Chasse-neige, Valses oubliées. Decca, 1985.
- Franz Liszt - Harmonies Poétiques et Religieuses. Meridian Records.
- Felix Mendelssohn - Concertos for two pianos + Benjamin Frith; RTÉ Sinfonietta - Proinnsias O'Duinn. Naxos Records
- Ian Wilson - Music por violin and piano: BIG, Drive, From the book of longing, A haunted heart, Spilliaert's beach. Riverrun Records.
