= Death on the Nile (disambiguation) =

Death on the Nile is a novel by Agatha Christie published in 1937.

Death on the Nile may also refer to:

- Death on the Nile (1978 film), film based on the novel, directed by John Guillermin.
- "Death on the Nile", 2004 episode of the ITV series Agatha Christie's Poirot.
- Death on the Nile (2022 film), film based on the novel, directed by Kenneth Branagh.
  - Death on the Nile (soundtrack), soundtrack for the 2022 film, composed by Patrick Doyle.
- "Death on the Nile" (short story), unrelated 1934 short story by Agatha Christie.
- "Death on the Nile" (Willis short story), 1993 science fiction short story by Connie Willis

== See also ==
- "Death on Denial", third episode of the second season of Chucky.
