= Ardee Baroque Festival =

The Ardee Baroque Festival is an annual music festival, covering baroque music from the seventeenth and eighteenth centuries, which takes place each November in Ardee, County Louth in Ireland.

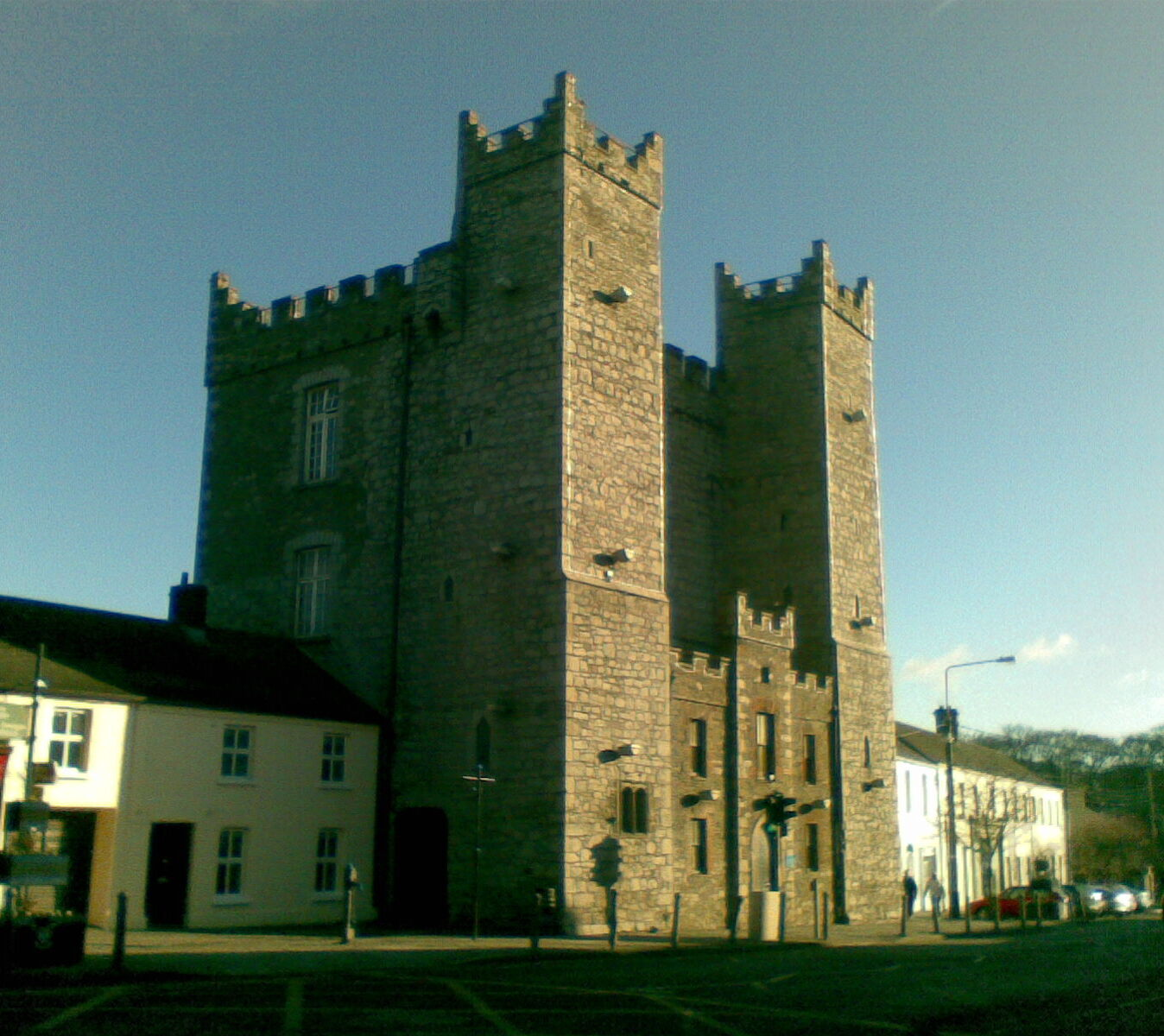
Ardee Castle has been used as a venue for some festival performances

The festival, which was first held in 2004, hosted its "20th season" in November 2023. The festival was initially founded in collaboration with the Irish Baroque Orchestra (IBO). The IBO has previously been "orchestra in residence" at the festival, attending for the preceding week to undertake rehearsals, education outreach programs and other performances. The festival has also previously hosted performances from Dunedin Consort and New York Polyphony. Performances have been held in several venues within Ardee, including in Ardee Castle.

The board of Ardee Baroque Festival is drawn from the local community and collaborates with the Arts Service of Louth County Council in managing and marketing the festival. The festival obtains financial support from the Arts Council of Ireland.

In a review in The Irish Times, the event was described as "a music festival that could hold its head up anywhere". A 2011 review, in The Sunday Times, described it as among the "most quaint" of the "boutique music festivals staged around Ireland".
