= Celso Antunes =

Brazilian conductor located in Germany

- Born: Celso Leite Antunes Filho; 12 November 1959 (age 67); São Paulo, Brazil
- Education: Musikhochschule Köln
- Occupations: conductor, pianist
- Website: celsoantunes.net

Celso Antunes (born November 12, 1959) is a Brazilian conductor located in Germany.

== Biography ==
Antunes studied singing and conducting at the University of São Paulo, achieved recognition as assistant conductor of the São Paulo Youth Symphony Orchestra and obtained a DAAD scholarship to complete his studies on at the Musikhochschule Köln in Germany, where he graduated in 1990.

Shortly afterward, in 1991, Antunes founded his own new music group, the Tippett Ensemble, which continues to give concerts throughout Europe, always featuring mainly contemporary music.

Following his debut with the Neues Rheinisches Kammerorchester at the Kölner Philharmonie, he was appointed its Chief Conductor, a post he held from 1994 until 1998. During roughly the same period (1994–1997) he was also Chief Conductor of the Antwerp-based ensemble Champ d'Action.

His engagements have included appearances at the Flanders Festival, the Cologne MusikTriennale, the Kurt-Weill-Festival in Dessau and the Living Music Festival in Dublin.

Antunes has appeared with such artists as the Cappella Istropolitana Bratislava, the WDR Radio Symphony Orchestra, the Gürzenich Orchestra, the Irish Chamber Orchestra, the Latvian National Symphony Orchestra in Riga, the Radio Sinfonieorchester NDR Hannover, the Ulster Orchestra (Belfast) and the Deutsche Staatsphilharmonie Rheinland-Pfalz.

Between 2002 and 2007, Antunes was the Artistic Director and Chief Conductor of The National Chamber Choir of Ireland.

He also returns annually to conduct in Brazil, where he appears with the Camerata Fukuda and with the São Paulo State Symphony.

In August 2004, Antunes was bestowed the honour of the Order of Rio Branco, in the rank of Commander, by the Brazilian government, for the extraordinary artistic services rendered to his native Brazil.

== Selected discography ==
Album	Performer	Label	Year
Paulo Chagas "Sodoma"	Tippet Ensemble	Sub Rosa (SubCD 026-48, 1993)	1993
Karel Goeyvaerts "The serial works"	Champ D’Action	Megadisc (MDC 7845)	1998
Kurt Weill "Zaubernacht"	Ensemble Contrasts	Capriccio, Deutschland (LC 08748)	2002
Mozart / Haydn / Guarnieri / Schostakowitsch "Music for Strings"	Camerata Fukuda	Paulus (Brazil, CD 008237)	2006
"Ad Multos Annos", Contemporary Choral Works	National Chamber Choir	NCC/National Gallery, Ireland	2006
