= George Hurst (conductor) =

British conductor

George Hurst (20 May 1926 – 15 September 2012) was a British conductor.

== Early life ==
Hurst was born in Edinburgh, Scotland, in 1926, of Romanian and Russian parentage. He became a piano student in London of Julius Isserlis, grandfather of the cellist Steven Isserlis. On the outbreak of World War II, Hurst was sent to Canada, where he continued to study music at Bishop's College School in Lennoxville, Quebec and The Royal Conservatory of Music in Toronto, Ontario, Canada.

== Career ==
Hurst began his career as a writer and then his talent for composition was recognized while he was a student at Royal Conservatory in Toronto, Ontario, Canada. At age 21, he became a professor of composition at the Peabody Institute located in Baltimore, and also worked and studied with Pierre Monteux while he stayed in America. In North America, Hurst was affiliated with the York Symphony Orchestra (Pennsylvania) from 1950 to 1955.

Hurst acted as an associate conductor for the London Philharmonic Orchestra under Sir Adrian Boult in the early 1950s. He was the chief conductor of the BBC Northern Orchestra (later the BBC Philharmonic) from 1958 to 1968. In 1956, he took part in the London Philharmonic tour of Russia. His conducting work with the BBC Northern included the first Manchester performance of Arnold Schoenberg's Gurre-Lieder in February 1966, and also the premieres of Thomas Pitfield's Concerto lirico for violin and orchestra and Kenneth Leighton's Piano Concerto no.2 Op.37 (January 1962).

Hurst formed the Bournemouth Sinfonietta in 1968 and was their artistic adviser until 1974. With the Bournemouth Symphony Orchestra, he led the first London performance of the Second Symphony of Malcolm Williamson on 31 October 1969. He was principal guest conductor of the BBC Scottish Symphony Orchestra from 1986 to 1989. From 1990 to 1993, he was principal conductor of Ireland's RTÉ National Symphony Orchestra.

From 1960, Hurst was affiliated as a teacher with the Sherborne Summer School of Music (formerly Canford Summer School of Music). He was also a visiting professor at the Royal Academy of Music in London, and conducted from 1983 until his death.

== Recordings ==
Hurst's recordings include Wagner operatic orchestral extracts with the New Philharmonia, The Planets with the Bournemouth Symphony Orchestra, suites from King Arthur and Starlight Express by Elgar and English string music with the Bournemouth Sinfonietta, and Elgar's First Symphony with the BBC Philharmonic.

== Personal life ==
Hurst was married four times. His fourth wife Denise Ham, whom he married in 2007, survives him, as does his daughter.

== See also ==
- List of Bishop's College School alumni

Preceded by John Hopkins	Chief Conductor, BBC Northern Symphony Orchestra; 1958–1968	Succeeded by Bryden Thomson
Preceded by János Fürst	Principal Conductor, National Symphony Orchestra of Ireland; 1990–1993	Succeeded by Kasper de Roo
