= ConTempo Quartet =

String quartet in Ireland

- Origin: Bucharest, Romania; Galway, Ireland
- Genres: Classical, Contemporary
- Occupation: string quartet
- Years active: 1995–present
- Members: Bogdan Sofei, Ingrid Nicola, Andreea Banciu, Adrian Mantu
- Website: Official website

The ConTempo Quartet is a string quartet founded in Bucharest in 1995 and long-resident in Galway, Ireland, which has held international and national appointments in Ireland, performing in over 3000 concerts in 46 countries around the world.

== History ==
The quartet was formed in Bucharest in 1995, by a couple, Adrian Mantu and Andreea Banclu, and Ingrid Nicola and Bogdan Sofei, all attending the same university. Mantu and Banclu had met in a school for gifted musicians when aged 15 and 17, and were a couple, while Nicola and Sofei became a couple while the group were performing in an early concert together in Vienna in 1995. marrying in 2000.

While the members of the quartet were studying in Madrid, they considered applying for a multi-year musical residence in Galway, Ireland. They decided not to proceed but Mantu sent the application anyway, and they were awarded this placement, moving from Romania to Ireland in 2003. They have held the Galway Music Residency’s Ensemble in Residence since then, with a range of duties and activities, from actual performance to work with composers (they have had pieces written specifically for them), recording, public and school workshops, and both teaching in primary schools and working with school musical groups. The group works with classical music, but also various choral works, jazz, dance and traditional Irish music. Among their projects was a 3-year cycle of performances with works from all 27 EU member states.

Following a tender process, the ensemble added a national position as RTÉ's hosted string quartet, including regular performances at the National Concert Hall, from 2013. While holding this position, they were branded as the RTÉ ConTempo String Quartet. As part of the work with RTÉ, they performed two major cycles, by Beethoven and Béla Bartók, at locations around Ireland.

As of spring 2021, the ensemble had delivered more than 1,800 performances across 46 countries, and has performed before Pope John Paul II, the then Prince Charles and Nelson Mandela. The group has worked with other quartets, including The Vanbrugh in Ireland, and the Amadeus, Arditti, Casals and Endellion.

== Membership ==
As of 2020, the group consists of:

- Bogdan Sofei (first violin, leader)
- Ingrid Nicola (second violin)
- Andreea Banclu (viola)
- Adrian Mantu ('cello)

By 2020, the group were the only string quartet regularly operating at concert level in Ireland, though two new quartets, the Spero and the Banbha, launched later that year.

== Recognition ==
The quartet has won multiple international musical competition prizes, including first places at the GrosserForderpreise, the Valentino Bucchi competition and the Tunnel Trust Competition in London-UK, the Wigmore Award and the Romanian Musical Critics Union Prize in Bucharest. At the London International String Quartet competition, they won 3rd prize but also the Audience Appreciation prize, the first time that that did not go to the 1st or 2nd prize winners. The four members of the group were awarded honorary doctorates by the University of Galway in 2016, for their performance and educational work.

== Personal lives ==
The group consists of four Romanian-born Irish citizens in two married couples. Banclu and Mantu are from Bucharest; Banclu's parents moved to Rome when she was 16, and she remained in Romania with an aunt. They married in 2000 and have two daughters. Mantu's father died while visiting Ireland in 2009. Sofei and Nicola, born a month apart in Bucharest, and a couple since 1995, married in 2000. They also have two daughters.

== See also ==
- The Vanbrugh
