= Bernadette Greevy =

Irish singer

- Birth name: Bernadette Greevy
- Born: 3 July 1940; Clontarf, Dublin, Ireland
- Died: 26 September 2008 (aged 68)
- Genres: Classical
- Occupation: Singer
- Years active: 1958–2008
- Spouse: Peter Tattan (m. 1965; died 1983)

Bernadette Greevy (3 July 1940 – 26 September 2008) was an Irish mezzo-soprano. She was founder and artistic director of the Anna Livia Dublin International Opera Festival. She was the first artist-in-residence at the Dublin Institute of Technology's Faculty of Applied Arts.

== Biography ==
Bernadette Greevy was born in Clontarf, Dublin, and was one of seven children. She went to school at the Holy Faith Convent School in Clontarf and later studied in Dublin with Jean Nolan and at the Guildhall School of Music and Drama in London with Helene Isepp.

Greevy made her first appearance on the operatic stage at the age of 18 in the role of Siebel in Gounod's Faust at Dublin's Gaiety Theatre. She appeared in Julius Benedict's opera, The Lily of Killarney at Dublin's Olympia Theatre in 1960, alongside Veronica Dunne, John Carolan and Denis Noble with conductor Fr. John O'Brien and the Glasnevin Musical Society. In 1961, she made her professional operatic debut as Maddalena in the Dublin Grand Opera Society's production of Verdi's Rigoletto. She appeared at the Wexford Festival in 1962 as Beppe in Pietro Mascagni's L'amico Fritz. She made her Royal Opera House début in 1982 as Genevieve in Claude Debussy's Pelléas et Mélisande.

However, Greevy never developed the acting skills necessary for true operatic success, and made her musical mark instead in the world of oratorio and song recitals. She was introduced to works such as Elgar's The Dream of Gerontius and Handel's Messiah by Sir John Barbirolli, and later recorded music by Mahler, Bach and Haydn.

A 1966 review by Howard Klein in The New York Times of Greevy's recording of Handel arias stated: "The voice has the firm, compact resonance of a true contralto. She has endless breath and can move her voice with agility and precision."

Greevy had a special affinity with Mahler, in particular his orchestral song cycles. In 1966, she performed Kindertotenlieder in London with the then RTÉ National Symphony Orchestra. The Times praised the 26-year-old Greevy's "full, glowing voice, rich and firm at the bottom, radiant at the top, and gloriously expressive phrasing". Later, in the 1990s, she performed all Mahler's vocal works with orchestra over a four-year period in the Teatro Colon, Buenos Aires, Argentina.

Greevy chose to live in her native Dublin throughout her career rather than be based in one of the world's major music centres. She maintained confidently that "if you're good enough you can live where you like". Nevertheless, this decision undoubtedly curtailed her opportunities in the recording studio and on the concert stage.

Bernadette Greevy died aged 68 following a short illness. She was married to Peter Tattan, who predeceased her in 1983. They had one son, Hugh.

== Operatic roles ==
- Bizet: Carmen (Carmen)
- Britten: The Rape of Lucretia (Lucretia)
- Gluck: Orfeo e Euridice (Orfeo)
- Handel: Ariodante
- Massenet: Hérodiade (Hérodiade)
- Massenet: Werther
- Purcell: Dido and Aeneas (Dido)
- Saint-Saëns: Samson et Dalila (Delilah)
- Verdi: Il trovatore (Azucena)
- Verdi: Don Carlos (Eboli)

== Awards and honours ==
These include:

- Harriet Cohen International Music Award for Outstanding Artistry
- National Order of Merit (conferred by Malta)
- Honorary Doctorate of Music, National University of Ireland
- Honorary Doctorate of Music, Trinity College Dublin
- Jacob's Award (1978) for her performance on radio of Mahler
- The papal cross Pro Ecclesia et Pontifice (conferred by the Holy See)

== Selected recordings ==
- Mahler: Kindertotenlieder/Rückert Lieder (1997) (with the RTÉ National Symphony Orchestra conducted by János Fürst), Naxos 8.554156
- A Sheaf of Songs from Ireland (1998) (features songs by John F. Larchet, Charles Villiers Stanford, Carl Hardebeck, Gerard Victory, Vincent O'Brien and Havelock Nelson), Marco Polo 8.225098
- Great Handel Arias (1998) (with the Academy of St. Martin in the Fields conducted by Raymond Leppard), Decca Eloquence 4615932
- Bernadette Greevy Sings Brahms (1998) (featuring Vier ernste Gesänge (Four Serious Songs), Op. 121, and Two Songs, for voice, viola and piano, Op. 91), Claddagh 52CD
- Elgar: Symphony No. 2 in E flat; Sea Pictures (1981) (with the London Philharmonic Orchestra conducted by Vernon Handley), EMI 575306
- Gerard Victory: Ultima Rerum (2004), Marco Polo 8.223532-33
