= RTÉ Concert Orchestra =

Irish orchestra

- Radio orchestra
- Former name: Radio Éireann Light Orchestra (1948)
- Founded: 1948; 78 years ago
- Location: Dublin and Cork, Ireland
- Principal conductor: Stephen Bell (guest); Gavin Maloney (associate)
- Website: orchestras.rte.ie

The RTÉ Concert Orchestra is a professional radio orchestra in Ireland and is part of RTÉ, the national broadcaster. Since its formation as the Radio Éireann Light Orchestra in 1948, the RTÉ Concert Orchestra has grown from a small studio-based recording group to become an active 45-strong orchestra performing over eighty concerts annually. It was part of RTÉ Performing Groups until 2022 when the National Symphony Orchestra was moved to the National Concert Hall along with Cór na nÓg. The orchestra performs classical, popular and big band evening and lunchtime concerts, covering a range of music from baroque to contemporary.

== Classical ==
The period from 2003 to 2006 saw a particular emphasis on the classical repertoire under the orchestra's then principal conductor Laurent Wagner. In this period the orchestra programmed classical-themed concerts compared to the "lighter" side that dominated under its previous principal conductor Proinnsias O'Duinn from 1978 to 2003, leading to collaboration with comperes such as Des Keogh, presenter of the popular radio programme Music for Middlebrows. 2007 saw the beginning of a classical series featuring incumbent principal conductor David Brophy, and Robert Houlihan with the best of Irish soloists at the Royal Dublin Society Concert Hall. 2014-2015 saw a return to classical repertoire with a particular emphasis on English composers such as Elgar, Coates and Vaughan Williams, and UK and international soloists under principal conductor John Wilson.

The orchestra has recorded for the Naxos and Marco Polo labels, and more recently with Universal and Decca.

It has performed many concerts with Irish choirs including the National Symphony Chorus, the Chamber Choir Ireland, the Galway Baroque Choir, the Tallaght Choral Society, the Culwick Choral Society, Dun Laoighaire Choral Society and has had a tradition of performing Handel's 'Messiah' with Our Lady's Choral Society, including in its first-ever performance in the Vatican in 2009.

In July 2017 at the Galway International Arts Festival, the orchestra with soloist Clare Hammond, gave the world premiere of Argentinian double Grammy-winning composer Claudia Montero´s Piano Concerto “Blanco y Negro” conducted by David Brophy, followed by a second performance at the National Concert Hall in Dublin.

== Opera ==
In addition to regular operatic gala concert performances with noted Irish international artists like Ailish Tynan, Cara O'Sullivan, Orla Boylan, Mary Hegarty, Regina Nathan, Majella Cullagh and Virginia Kerr, the orchestra has also worked with visiting artists including Denis O'Neill, Plácido Domingo, Luciano Pavarotti, José Carreras and Dame Kiri te Kanawa. From 1993 to 2008 it played for all Opera Ireland productions where it performed typically four full productions per year over the spring and winter opera seasons. Well-known operas by the Italian masters and others were performed along with more modern works such as Dead Man Walking by Jake Heggie (performed 2007), and Previn's A Streetcar Named Desire (performed 2006). It has recorded Irish composer's William Vincent Wallace’s ‘Maritana’ for Marco Polo label, and in 2008 performed Balfe's Falstaff, another Irish opera not performed since 1838. This historic performance was released later in 2008 on CD as a live recording.

== Educational ==
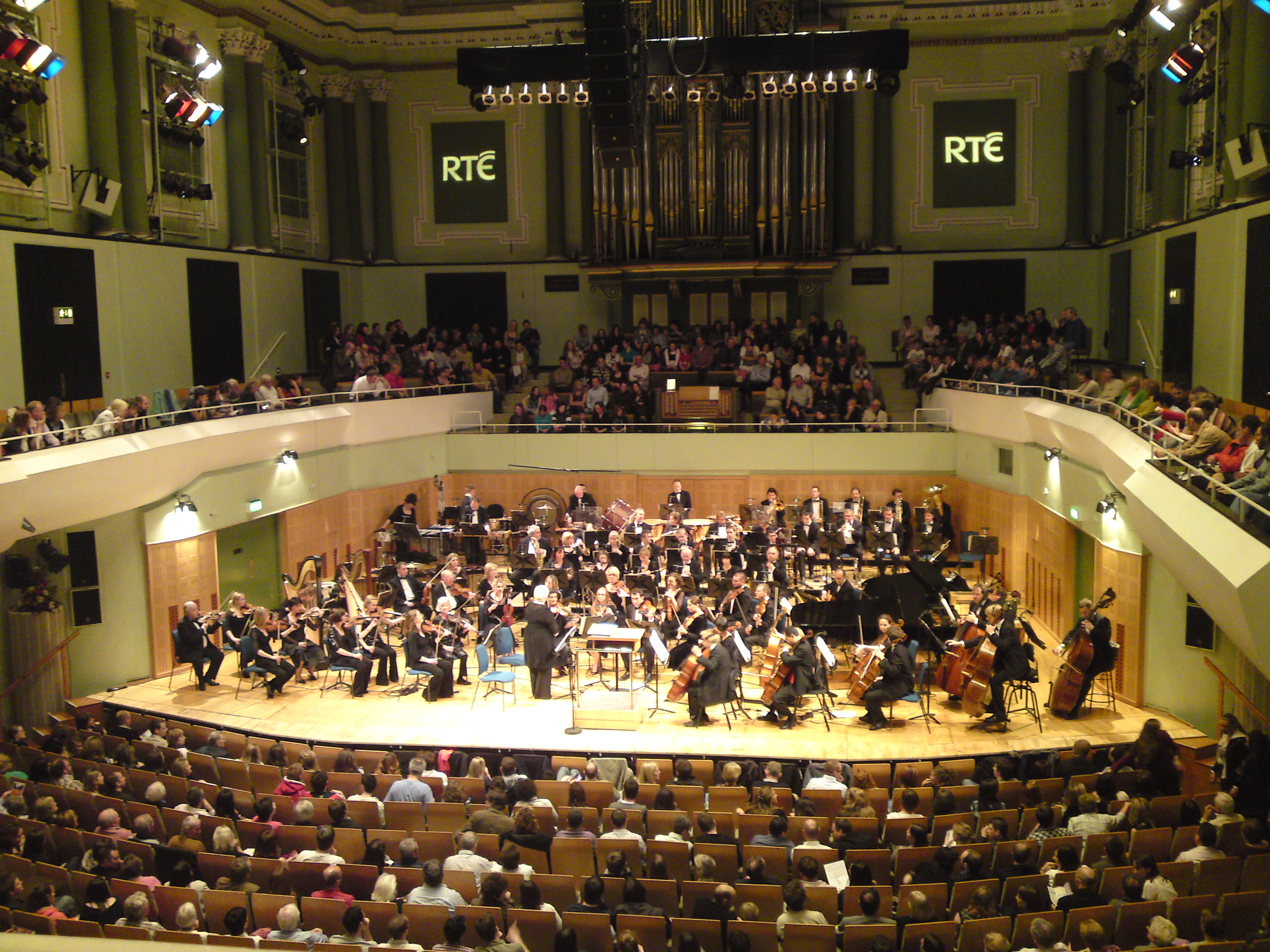
The orchestra in the National Concert Hall

The orchestra's primary educational initiative is the 'Music in the Classroom' series, conducted and devised by Gearóid Grant. The orchestra performs about 24 of these concerts per year, with audience numbers at about one thousand primary school children per concert.

== Jazz/swing ==
While a regular feature since the earlier days of the orchestra, with the expansion of the orchestra in the 1960s and players like Benny McNeill, Davy Martin, trumpets, John Tate and Harry Knowles, trombones, the orchestra has been a leading performer of jazz and big band repertoire. Arrangements by John Tate and Noel Kelehan defined the style of the orchestra and this tradition has continued with its current membership and arranging team as well as conductors. Visiting conductors like Bobby Lamb, Brian Byrne and John Wilson helped develop the orchestra's repertoire and style. Lamb worked with the orchestra from the 1980s, bringing with him well-known soloists, and playing many of his own arrangements and compositions. Wilson works regularly to recreate the arrangements and playing style of the golden Hollywood era of the 1940s to 1960s. In 2009 John Wilson was appointed principal guest conductor of the orchestra, and succeeded David Brophy as Principal Conductor of the orchestra in 2014, holding this position until 2016.

== Popular/contemporary ==
The RTÉ Concert Orchestra has always played an active role in bringing popular music into an orchestral setting. Through the 1970s, 80s and 1990s it performed for the Irish National Song Contest and played for the Eurovision Song Contest in 1971, 1981, 1988, 1993, 1994, 1995 and 1997. As part of the 1994 Eurovision the orchestra performed Riverdance as the interval act, premiering a work that was to go on to make enormous worldwide impact. Conductor Gareth Hudson worked extensively with the orchestra on TV shows, and musical theatre productions and continues to make his mark in this area. The orchestra has brought many international and Irish artists to the Irish public through its "Signature Series". Principal conductor David Brophy has worked on many of these concerts showing his ability to cover a broad range of styles including elements of pop, new age, contemporary songwriters etc.

The RTÉ Concert Orchestra combined with the Mooney radio programme and the RTÉ radio audience to create a concert series running to 11 concerts finishing in 2014, Mooney Tunes from the Grand Canal Theatre and the National Concert Hall. 2016 saw the first of a series of 'dance music' performances at venues like the Electric Picnic, the Three Arena Dublin with 2fm DJ Jenny Greene and Gemma Sugrue vocals.

== See also ==
- National Symphony Orchestra
- Philharmonic Choir
- Cór na nÓg
- Vanbrugh Quartet
