= Irish Baroque Orchestra =

- Orchestra
- Founded: 1996
- Principal conductor: Peter Whelan
- Website: www.irishbaroqueorchestra.com

The Irish Baroque Orchestra is an early music ensemble based in Ireland. Irish Baroque Orchestra is Ireland’s only professional period instrument orchestra. It was established in 1996 by Mark Duley and Thérèse Timoney. The artistic director is currently Peter Whelan.

The orchestra presents a season of concerts annually along with a number of one off events. The orchestra is funded annually by the Arts Council of Ireland, Dublin City Council and is a resident of the National Concert Hall, Dublin.

Irish Baroque Orchestra's annual sell out performances of Handel's Messiah are a highlight of Ireland's musical calendar. IBO records on Linn records and in April 2019 will release their forthcoming disc, Welcome Home Mr Dubourg.

It performs across the country, taking residency at the Ardee Baroque Festival each November in Ardee, County Louth. In 2009 the orchestra performed in the Dublin Handel Festival.

At the 2022 Laurence Olivier Awards, the orchestra won the Outstanding Achievement in Opera award, for their production of Bajazet at the Royal Opera House.
