= Benjamin Goodson =

- Born: December 22, 1990 (age 35); Edgware, London, England
- Occupation: Conductor
- Member of: Chief Conductor of the Netherlands Radio Choir

Benjamin Goodson (born 22 December 1990) is a British-German conductor based in Berlin whose work encompasses choral and instrumental music. He has served as Chief Conductor of the Netherlands Radio Choir since September 2020. He will take up the post of Chief Conductor of the SWR Vokalensemble in September 2028.

== Career ==
After a successful debut with the Netherlands Radio Choir, Goodson was appointed Chief Conductor of the ensemble at the age of 28. In 2025, it was announced that, after seven seasons leading the choir, Goodson would leave the position to take up the post of Chief Conductor and artistic director of the SWR Vokalensemble from 2028.

Goodson studied music at Hertford College, Oxford. From 2015 to 2016, he was Director of Chapel Music at Somerville College, Oxford. He teaches choral conducting at the Conservatorium van Amsterdam.

== Discography ==
- Songs of Renewal – Bath Camerata, Benjamin Goodson (conductor); SOMM Recordings, 2019.
- Pēteris Vasks: Distant Light – Daniel Rowland, Maja Bogdanović, Consensus Vocalis, Stift Festival Orchestra; Challenge Classics, 2020. Goodson conducts Vasks's Plainscapes and Dona nobis pacem.
- Rheinberger & Mendelssohn: Choral Works – Netherlands Radio Choir, Benjamin Goodson; Pentatone, 2023. The recording received five stars from BBC Music Magazine.
- The Voice of the Beloved – Netherlands Radio Choir, Benjamin Goodson; Pentatone, 2025, featuring music by Frank Martin, Jean-Yves Daniel-Lesur and Olivier Messiaen.
