= Death on the Nile (soundtrack) =

2022 film soundtrack album

Death on the Nile (Original Motion Picture Soundtrack)

Film score by Patrick Doyle
- Released: February 11, 2022
- Recorded: 2019–2021
- Genre: Film score
- Length: 64:27
- Label: Hollywood Records
- Producer: Patrick Doyle

Patrick Doyle chronology
Artemis Fowl (2020)	Death on the Nile (2022)

Death on the Nile (Original Motion Picture Soundtrack) is the film score to the 2022 film Death on the Nile directed by Kenneth Branagh based on the 1937 novel of the same name by Agatha Christie, which is the second instalment in the Hercule Poirot film series and a sequel to Murder on the Orient Express (2017). The score is composed by Patrick Doyle and was recorded remotely during the COVID-19 pandemic lockdown. It was released through Hollywood Records on February 11, 2022.

== Background ==
Branagh's frequent collaborator Patrick Doyle announced his involvement in Death of the Nile in January 2019. Due to the COVID-19 pandemic lockdown, which began before Branagh had presented a cut to the studio, Doyle wrote the music remotely at his home with Branagh supervising it through video conferencing. Considering the film's setting, Doyle wrote the score with Egyptian influences and utilized 1930s big band jazz and orchestral flavors into the score, while also integrating subtle, traditional instruments.

== Release ==
The soundtrack was released through Hollywood Records on February 11, 2022.

== Reception ==
Jonathan Broxton of Movie Music UK wrote "from my point of view, Death on the Nile is a success, and contains most of everything I love about Patrick Doyle's music – the lush and enveloping orchestral tones, the moments of eerie mystery and sinister underhandedness, the period textures, and the subtle and appropriate middle-eastern instrumental touches to evoke the Egyptian setting of the film, all of which lead up to a magnificent and emotional finale. It's clearly not as immediately attention-grabbing as some of the things he was writing in the 1990s, but there is still plenty there for Doyle fans to appreciate."

Filmtracks wrote "While dragging at times on album, Death on the Nile retains its narrative strength and presents more than enough Doyle lyricism to recommend. The main and romance themes are engaging and sound fantastic, and thirty minutes of this material can be combined with Murder on the Orient Express for a resounding presentation of Doyle drama." Pete Hammond of Deadline Hollywood wrote "the music by Patrick Doyle is right up to the usual standards of this exceptional composer." Clarence Moye of Awards Daily called it "a lovely score by frequent Branagh collaborator Patrick Doyle". Emily Zemler of The Observer called it a "foreboding score".

== Track listing ==
No.	Title	Length
1.	"The Trenches"	1:30
2.	"What About This?"	1:38
3.	"The Pyramids"	2:28
4.	"Bourgeois Nightmare"	2:00
5.	"The Newly Weds"	1:31
6.	"She's Back"	2:04
7.	"A Single Bullet"	1:38
8.	"Immortal Longings"	1:11
9.	"Abu Simbel"	3:07
10.	"Come with Me"	3:28
11.	"Suspects"	2:00
12.	"One Last Cork"	2:27
13.	"Goodnight Jacks"	3:40
14.	"Alibi"	2:24
15.	"Someone Is Dead"	1:37
16.	"Inheritance"	2:49
17.	"You Killed Them"	3:39
18.	"Let Poirot Work"	1:04
19.	"One Final Interview"	3:13
20.	"Was Someone Hurt?"	3:03
21.	"I Wasn't Thinking"	4:53
22.	"I Needed Him"	2:39
23.	"Perhaps"	3:16
24.	"The Cost of Love"	2:14
25.	"Death on the Nile"	4:54
Total length:		64:27

== Accolades ==
Year	Award	Category	Nominee(s)	Result	Ref.
2023	ASCAP Film and Television Music Awards	Top Box Office Films	Patrick Doyle	Nominated	
2023	Ivor Novello Award	Best Original Film Score	Patrick Doyle	Nominated	
