= Ardee Castle =

Fortified medieval tower house in County Louth, Ireland

- St. Leger's Castle
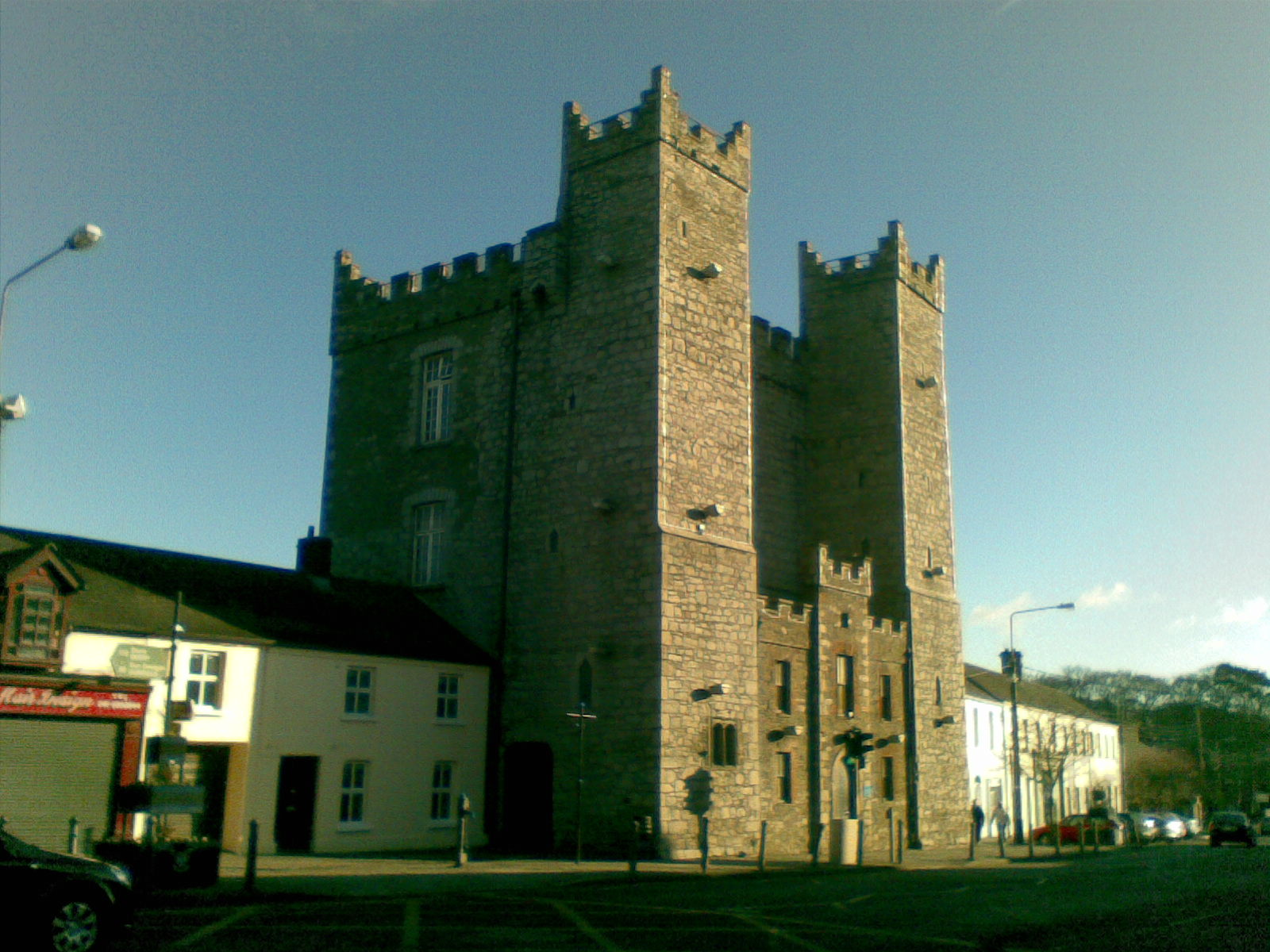

- Location within Ireland
- 53.8551°N 6.5387°W
- Location: Ardee, County Louth, Ireland

History
- Built: 15th century

Site notes
- Owner: State

National monument of Ireland

Ardee Castle also known as St. Leger's Castle, is a fortified medieval tower house in Ardee, County Louth in Ireland. Built in the 15th century, the castle was used as a prison during the 17th and 18th centuries and became Ardee's district courthouse until June 2006 when a specialised facility took its place. Ardee Castle is the largest fortified medieval Tower House in Ireland or Britain. The castle was originally built by Roger de Peppard in 1207, but not much is left from the original walls.

== History ==
St. Leger's Castle was built in the 15th century by John St. Leger and it served as a stronghold for the defence of the Pale. Over the years it was fought over by the O'Neills and the English. In 1641 Sir Phelim O'Neill took possession of the town and set up the Irish Army headquarters, but on the retreat the town and castle were retaken by the English Forces under the command of Sir Henry Tichborne, a garrison was then placed and O'Neill's rear-guard was defeated. In 1690 the castle was used by James II as his headquarters prior to the Battle of the Boyne.

== Location ==
St Leger's Castle is located on Castle Street in Ardee.

== Structure ==
The rectangular building stands four storeys high, with turrets situated at the north-west and south-west angles, the main entrance was protected by a machicolation on the outside, with a 'murder-hole' on the interior.

The ground floor has a rounded barrel vault, and access to the upper storeys is by means of a stairway in the north-west turret.

As the structure has been in continuous use, most of the windows have been replaced and modernised over time, however a twin-light ogee-arched window survives at ground level and three single looped, internal splay windows survive on the fourth floor.
