= Paddy Saul =

Irish aviator

- Born: Jonathan Patrick Saul; 15 March 1895; Skerries, County Dublin
- Died: 22 June 1968 (aged 73); Rathmullen, County Donegal
- Aviation career
- Famous flights: Southern Cross as navigator and first East-West trans-Atlantic flight with Kingsford-Smith, June 1930, also as navigator

Captain Jonathan Patrick Saul (15 March 1895 – 22 June 1968) was an Irish aviator and seaman.

== Early life and family ==
Saul was one of seven children of Thomas and Catherine Saul. He was born in Skerries, County Dublin in 1894. Saul was educated in St Patrick's Cathedral Grammar School, Dublin, but left education early to pursue a life at sea. His first job was nautical going to sea at the age of fifteen and gained a Master's Certificate in navigation.

Saul's first wife drowned at sea in a boating accident in 1922 off the French coast, Saul swam to safety with their infant daughter and Saul's only child, Patricia. His second wife also predeceased him. He retired and lived at Ashfield Park, Stillorgan, County Dublin.

== Army service and later career ==
During World War I he joined the Royal Flying Corps (1917) and a while after the war the Irish Aero Club, becoming a committee member in 1929. In 1930 he was the navigator for a stage of Charles Kingsford Smith the round-the-world flight in the Fokker F.VIIb/3m trimotor monoplane The Southern Cross. But his most important flight was to navigate an East to West transatlantic flight from Ireland to Newfoundland in June 1930. Kingsford-Smith captained the flight with Dutch co-pilot Evert van Dyke, radio operator John Stannage, and Paddy Saul navigating. They were treated to a ticker-tape parade in New York on 25 June 1930 - a parade that stretched for miles. They had aimed for New York but ran short on fuel and had to land in Newfoundland after contacting US warship Wyoming by radio.

Saul was amongst the speakers that Lady Heath invited to speak to the National Junior Aviation Club in the 1930s. In 1932, Saul and W.R. Elliott flew Amy Johnson and her husband Jim Mollison over the west of Ireland to survey suitable sites for Mollison's Atlantic attempt in The Heart's Content. Later in his career he was involved with the establishment of Irish Air Traffic Control. Saul became a civilian navigational instructor with the Royal Air Force in 1937, rising to the position of Commanding Officer of Coastal Command Operations at Crown Hill, and implementing a scheme to replace male operatives with women.

== Death ==
Saul died suddenly, on a fishing boat whilst taking part in the Lough Swilly sea angling festival on 22 June 1968.

== Legacy ==
Saul was one of four pilots to be commemorated in the An Post series of stamps in 1998 of Irish Aviation Pioneers.
