= Gerhard Markson =

German conductor

- Occupation: Conductor
- Years active: 1970 – present
- Labels: Naxos Records
- Website: http://gerhardmarkson.com/

Gerhard Markson is a German conductor. His most recent post was Principal Conductor of the RTÉ National Symphony Orchestra, but his term ended in May 2009.

== Biography ==
He studied at the Frankfurt Academy of Music. During the 1970s he participated regularly in Igor Markevitch's international conducting classes in Monte Carlo and studied with Franco Ferrara in Rome. Having worked as an opera and symphony conductor at the opera houses in Augsburg, Oldenburg and Freiburg, he became music director at Hagen Theatre from 1991 to 1998. During that time he was invited to such renowned opera houses as the Bavarian State Opera in Munich, Hamburg State Opera and the Norwegian State Opera in Oslo. He has worked with over 100 orchestras worldwide, including the St. Cecilia Orchestra in Rome, RAI Turino, Monte Carlo Philharmonic, Bournemouth Symphony Orchestra, Norwegian Radio Symphony Orchestra, Swiss Radio Symphony Orchestra in Basel and the Polish Radio Symphony Orchestra in Katowice. Markson has appeared at such festivals as the Berlin Festival Weeks, Colorado Music Festival, the Hong Kong Festival and the Seoul Festival.

== RTÉ National Symphony Orchestra ==
In September 2001 Gerhard Markson took up the role of Principal Conductor of the Irish RTÉ National Symphony Orchestra. He has conducted many works including Gustav Mahler's Symphony No. 8, Carl Orff's Carmina Burana. As well as Mozart's, Ludwig van Beethoven's and Strauss' most famous works. He has been the conductor for many Naxos recordings. In May 2009 Markson's term as Principal Conductor ended. He is set though, to return as a guest conductor.

== See also ==
- RTÉ Performing Groups
