= Colman Pearce =

Irish pianist and conductor (born 1938)

Colman Pearce (born 22 September 1938) is an Irish pianist and conductor.

Born in Dublin, Pearce was educated at University College Dublin and studied conducting in Hilversum and Vienna. He became a conductor for the RTÉ Concert Orchestra in the late 1960s as well as being musical director for the 1971 Eurovision Song Contest and then conducting the 1972, 1973, 1974 and 1975 Irish entries.

He became a principal conductor for the RTÉ National Symphony Orchestra in 1981 until retiring in 1983. He was principal guest conductor of the Bilbao Symphony Orchestra from 1984 to 1987. From 1987 to 1999 he was principal conductor and music director of the Mississippi Symphony Orchestra and, in his final year, was the recipient of the Governor's Award for Excellence in the Arts in the State of Mississippi. He was also made a Freeman of the City of New Orleans. Colman is also principal guest conductor of the Dublin Philharmonic Orchestra.

Preceded by (Netherlands) Dolf van der Linden	Eurovision Song Contest conductor 1971	Succeeded by (United Kingdom) Malcolm Lockyer
