= The Vanbrugh =

Irish string group

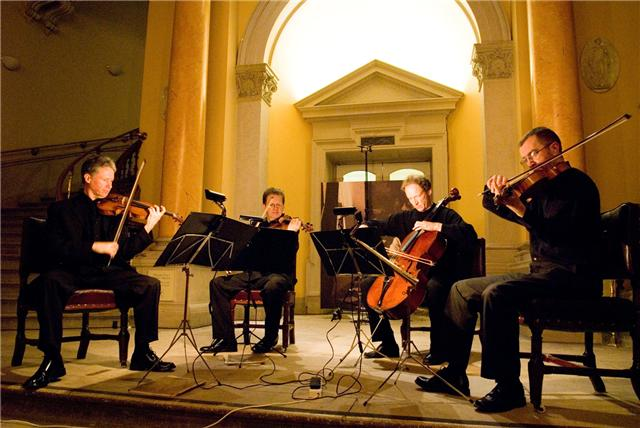

Background information
- Also known as: RTÉ Vanbrugh Quartet
- Origin: Cork, Ireland
- Genre: String quartet
- Years active: 1986–present
- Members: Violin; Keith Pascoe; Viola; Simon Aspell; Cello; Christopher Marwood
- Past members: Violin; Gregory Ellis; Elizabeth Charleson
- Website: www.vanbrughquartet.com

The Vanbrugh, often styled The Vanbrugh and Friends and previously the RTÉ Vanbrugh Quartet, is an Irish classical musical group. The resident string quartet to Raidió Teilifís Éireann, Ireland's national broadcasting service, until 2013, and collectively artists-in-residence to University College Cork, the Quartet members were also founders of the West Cork Chamber Music Festival.

== Organisation and history ==
Former logo

The group comprises Keith Pascoe on violins, Simon Aspell on viola and Christopher Marwood with cello, and they add 1-2 members for each performance. The quartet was co-founded with Gregory Ellis and was part of RTÉ Performing Groups.

== See also ==
- RTÉ National Symphony Orchestra
- RTÉ Concert Orchestra
- RTÉ Philharmonic Choir
- RTÉ Cór na nÓg
