= Virginia Kerr =

Irish soprano

Virginia Kerr (born 14 May 1954) is an Irish soprano who appears frequently in concerts, opera, oratorio and recitals.

She has sung with many of the world's leading orchestras, including the London Philharmonic Orchestra, Royal Opera House Covent Garden, Leipzig Gewandhaus Orchestra, The Hallé and the Royal Philharmonic Orchestras. Her operatic and concert performances have also taken her to Far East, Russia and North and South America.

At the Royal Opera House in Covent Garden she has sung the roles of Jennifer in The Midsummer Marriage, Frau in Erwartung, Ortlinde in Die Walküre, Guinivere in Gawain. She has also sung with Opera Theatre Company, Opera Ireland, Leipzig Opera, Scottish Opera, Opera North, Opera de Nantes and the Glyndebourne Festival Opera. She sang with the Glyndebourne Festival Opera at the BBC Proms at the Royal Albert Hall.

Kerr is a keen advocate of contemporary music. She sang the role of Antonia Frieth in the European and Italian premiere of Michael Berkeley's opera For You. The libretto was written by the British author Ian McEwan.

As of March 2024, Kerr was listed as a Professor of Vocal Studies at the Royal Irish Academy of Music. She was formerly the chairperson of the Opera Theatre Company.

== Discography ==
- My Heart and I, solo CD
- Ultima Rerum, Gerard Victory
- Requiem/The Veiled Prophet of Khorassan, Sir Charles Villiers Stanford
