= National Symphony Chorus =

- Choir
- Former name: RTÉ Philharmonic Choir
- Origin: Dublin, Cork
- Founded: 1985; 40 years ago
- Genre: Classical, choral, symphonic, jazz, operatic, contemporary
- Label: Naxos Records
- Website: Official website

The National Symphony Chorus (formerly RTÉ Philharmonic Choir) is an Irish choir, organisationally part of Ireland's National Concert Hall since 2022.

== Organisation ==
Former logo

The choir was part of RTÉ Performing Groups until 2022. The chorus master is Mark Hindley.

The choir members, all of whom commit their services entirely voluntarily, meet each Wednesday from 7.30 pm-10.00 pm for rehearsals in the RTÉ Radio Centre and once a year gather for a residential training weekend which provides social opportunities alongside intensive workshops on technique, ensemble and repertoire.

== Activities ==
The choir has been central to choral music in Ireland since its foundation by Colin Mawby in 1985, following the introduction of a new choral policy. This 140-strong choir is the country's premier symphonic choral ensemble and has performed more than 52 of the major choral works since its foundation, mostly in conjunction with the RTÉ Concert Orchestra and the National Symphony Orchestra. It has also worked with RTÉ Cór na nÓg and the RTÉ Vanbrugh Quartet. It broadcasts frequently on RTÉ lyric fm.
