= Colin Mawby =

English organist, choral conductor and composer (1936–2019)

Colin Mawby KSG
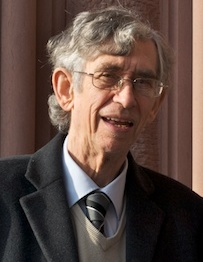
- Colin Mawby at St. Bonifatius, Wiesbaden, in 2011
- Born: 9 May 1936; Portsmouth, Hampshire, England, United Kingdom
- Died: 24 November 2019 (aged 83)
- Education: Royal College of Music
- Occupations: Choral conductor; Composer; Academic teacher
- Organizations: Westminster Cathedral; Radio Telefís Éireann
- Awards: Order of St. Gregory

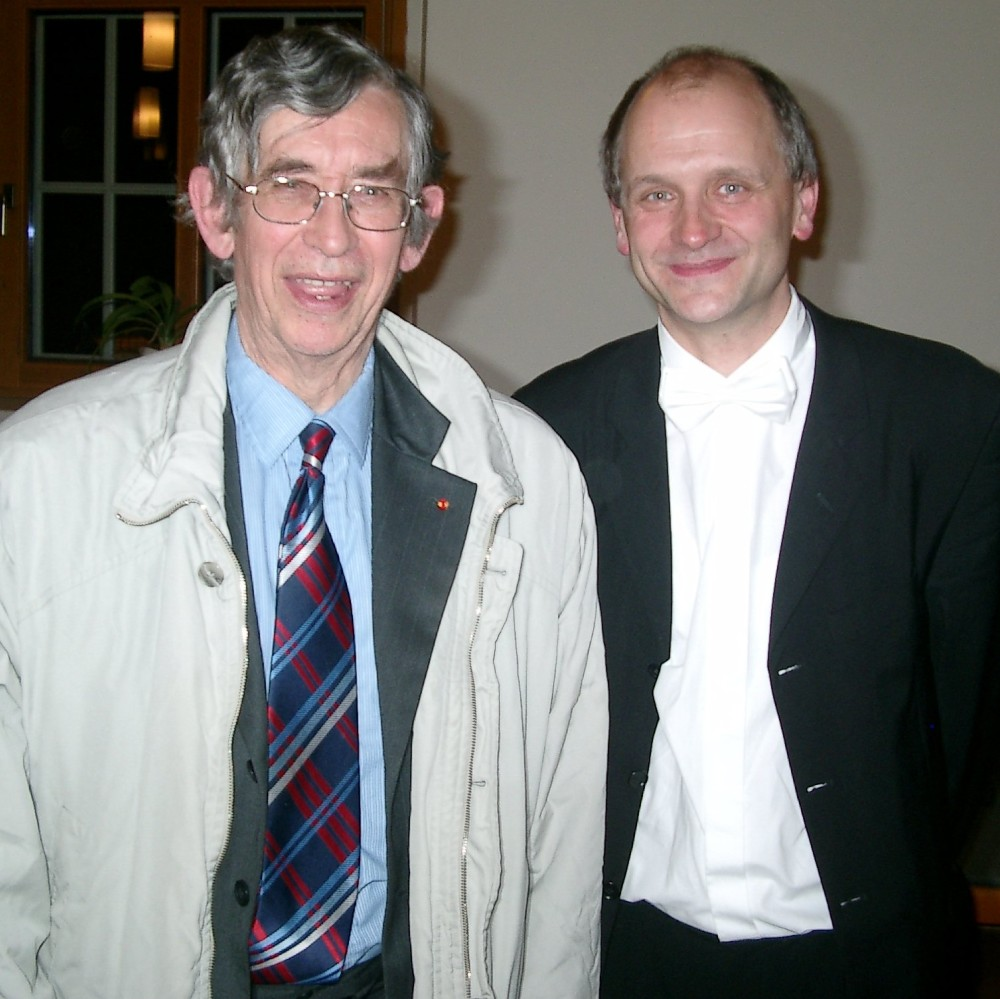
Mawby (left) with Michael Scholl of Biederitzer Kantorei in 2007

Colin Mawby KSG (9 May 1936 – 24 November 2019) was an English organist, choral conductor and composer. From 1961 he was Master of Music at Westminster Cathedral. Later he served as choral director at Radio Telefís Éireann and as artistic director of Chamber Choir Ireland, then known as the National Chamber Choir. He composed extensively for the liturgy, with an output including over fifty masses and five song cycles. He was appointed a Knight of the Order of St. Gregory by Pope Benedict XVI for services to church music.

== Early life and education ==
Mawby was born in Portsmouth, Hampshire, on 9 May 1936. His mother died when he was three, and he was among the first choristers when Westminster Cathedral choir school reopened in January 1946. Under George Malcolm, the boys sang fourteen or fifteen services a week and undertook ten hours of rehearsals, learning plainchant and polyphony. From the age of twelve, Mawby assisted Malcolm at the organ. He later studied at the Royal College of Music with Gordon Jacob and John Churchill, and during this period worked with Adrian Boult and Malcolm Sargent. Before returning to Westminster he served as choirmaster at Our Lady of the Assumption and St Gregory, Warwick Street and at Portsmouth Cathedral.

== Career ==
=== Westminster Cathedral ===
Mawby became Assistant Master of Music at Westminster Cathedral and succeeded Francis Cameron as Master of Music in 1961. During his tenure he brought the choir to wider prominence through broadcasts and recordings, and conducted the founding performances of the early music ensemble Pro Cantione Antiqua. The choir performed in Rome in 1963 and again in 1970 for the canonisation of the Forty Martyrs of England and Wales, when it became the first ensemble other than the Sistine Choir to sing a papal mass in St Peter's Basilica. He also collaborated with the London Mozart Players, the Wren Orchestra, the Belgian Radio Choir and the BBC Singers, and performed for Queen Elizabeth II at St Paul's Cathedral, for President John F. Kennedy at Westminster Cathedral, and at St Peter's Basilica for Pope Paul VI and Pope John Paul II.

Mawby's tenure at Westminster ended in the mid-1970s after disputes over musical policy and the future of the choir school in the aftermath of the Second Vatican Council. He later taught at Trinity College of Music.

=== Ireland ===
Mawby moved to Dublin in 1976 and became Choral Director at RTÉ in 1981. In 1985 he founded the RTÉ Philharmonic Choir and RTÉ Cór na nÓg, and developed the RTÉ Chamber Choir. He later became artistic director of the National Chamber Choir of Ireland, and on his retirement in 2001 was appointed Artistic Director Emeritus. In 2026 Chamber Choir Ireland established the inaugural Colin Mawby Composition Prize in his honour.

Mawby retired to East Anglia in 2001 but later divided his time between London and Dublin. He served as composer in association with St Mary's Pro-Cathedral, Dublin. From 1994 to 2017 he published Vivace!, a newsletter for church choirs.

== Works ==
Mawby composed extensively for voice throughout his career, with an output exceeding fifty masses, five song cycles, numerous choral settings, two children's operas, and organ music. He said in 2006 that he began to pursue composition seriously at about the age of fifty-two, prompted by the birth of his first son and the need to support his family. He received commissions from RTÉ, Westminster Cathedral, Liverpool Cathedral, the Royal School of Church Music, the Cathedral of the Madeleine, Salt Lake City, and Grace Church, New York.

His Ave verum corpus for choir became widely performed, and his setting of Psalm 23 gained wider recognition through its recording by Charlotte Church. His motet Tu es Petrus, written for the Sistine Choir at its request, was sung by the choir at papal liturgies. His Requiem of Hope for soprano, mixed choir and organ, composed from 1995 to 2002, draws on texts by Henry Vaughan, John Henry Newman and anonymous sources. The Heavenly Christmas Tree, written for RTÉ Cór na nÓg and the National Chamber Choir, is among the works most closely associated with his Irish period. A Te Deum for soprano solo, chorus, organ and brass ensemble was premiered in Cambridge in 2006 to mark his 70th birthday, and his setting of Laudate Pueri Dominum was premiered in 2011 at Westminster Cathedral Hall.

His secular works include two operas for young people, The Torc of Gold (1996) and The Quest (2000, premiered in 2001), both on librettos by Maeve Ingoldsby, commissioned by the National Chamber Choir and premiered in Dublin under his direction. On a commission by St. Bonifatius, Wiesbaden, he composed in 2011 the Missa solemnis Bonifatius-Messe for soprano, choir, children's choir, oboe and organ, premiered on 3 October 2012 to celebrate the 150th anniversary of the Chor von St. Bonifatius, conducted by Gabriel Dessauer.

Mawby said in 2006: "I cannot write choral music unless I work with choirs. Now that's a subjective judgement: I know that lots of people can do these things; I can't. I have to write for particular people." His works were published internationally, including by Dr. J. Butz in Germany and by Eurarte and Casa Musicale Carrara in Italy.

Mawby died on 24 November 2019.
