= Cór na nÓg =

Irish children's choir

- Choir
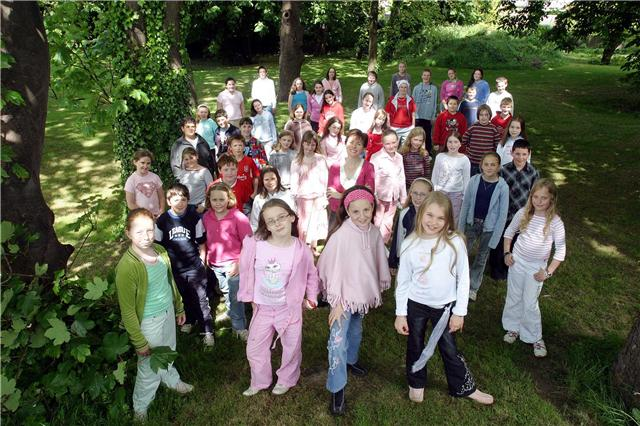
- Cór na nÓg in 2009
- Origin: Dublin, Ireland
- Founded: 1985
- Genre: Choral
- Associated groups: National Symphony Chorus, Cór Linn
- Website: nch.ie

Cór na nÓg ('children's choir' in English) is an Irish children's choir. Founded as RTÉ Cór na nÓg and originally coordinated by RTÉ, the choir has been overseen by the National Concert Hall (NCH) since early 2022.

== History ==
The choir was founded in 1985 by RTÉ choral director Colin Mawby. As of 2018, the group had 62 members, with choristers ranging from the ages of 10 to 14. The choir have received positive reviews from several publications. The choir was transferred from RTÉ to the NCH in January 2022.

== Performances ==
The group has performed at venues such as the National Concert Hall, the National Gallery of Ireland, Christ Church Cathedral, Dublin, and the 3Arena. Performances are sometimes made with the RTÉ National Symphony Orchestra and the RTÉ Concert Orchestra. The choir has also appeared on RTÉ Television and RTÉ Radio, including on religious programmes on RTÉ One.

The choir have also performed at the Dublin International Organ Festival, various Opera Ireland productions, Opera Theatre Company's Cinderella and the Russian State Ballet's Nutcracker. During 2007, the group had 9 public performances, including one in Dublin Castle for an EBU Radio Assembly and Gustav Mahler's Symphony of a Thousand at the National Basketball Arena. The choir also has a large Christmas schedule, and the choir hosts a concert in St. Ann's Church in Dawson Street annually.

On 5 January 2024, Cór na nÓg, Cór Linn and the National Symphony Chorus performed Faure's Requiem along with the National Symphony Orchestra.

== Recordings ==
Recordings have included Gerard Victory's Ultima Rerum, the CD/Video Faith of Our Fathers, Scenes of an Irish Christmas and a CD of Christmas produced for RTÉ Lyric FM and the RTÉ Guide in 2005.
