= National Concert Hall =

Concert hall with musical groups in Dublin, Ireland

Coordinates: 53.33464°N 6.25909°W

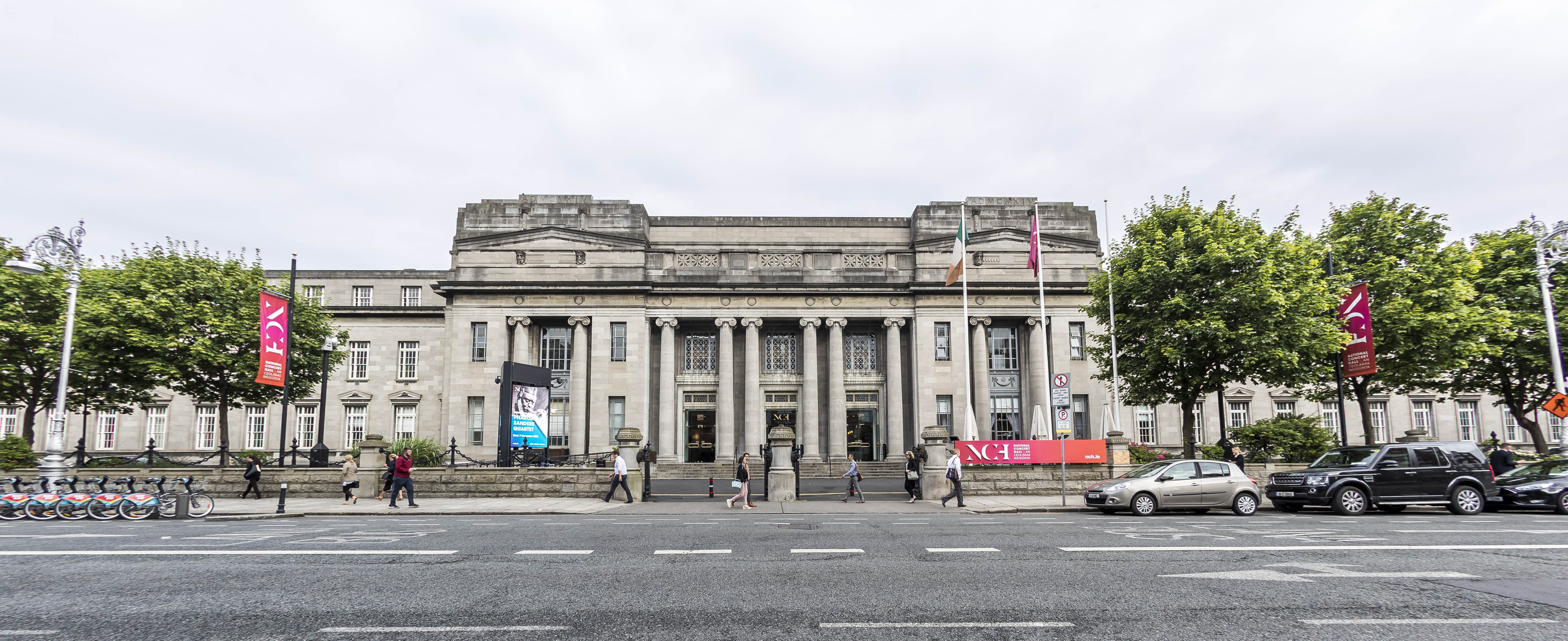
Exterior of the National Concert Hall

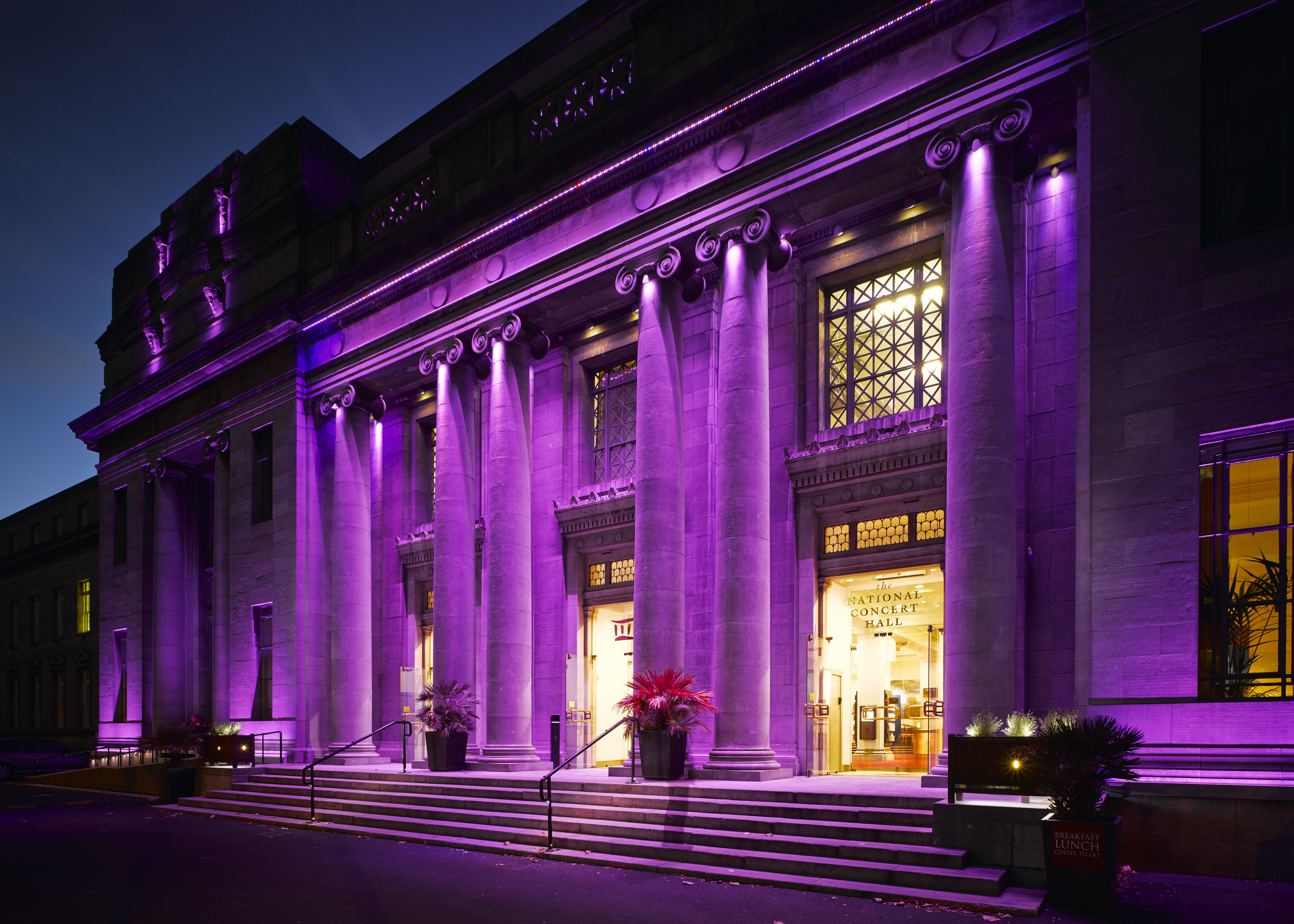
Exterior of the National Concert Hall at night

The National Concert Hall (NCH; Irish: An Ceoláras Náisiúnta) is a national cultural institution, sometimes described as "the home of music in Ireland". It comprises the actual concert hall operation, which in various chambers hosts over 1,000 events each year, as well as a full orchestra, National Symphony Orchestra Ireland, and three choirs: National Symphony Chorus Ireland, NCH Cór na nÓg and NCH Cór Linn.

Originally built for the Dublin International Exhibition of Arts and Manufactures of 1865, the structure was converted into the central building of University College Dublin (UCD) at the foundation of the National University of Ireland in 1908. When UCD began to relocate to a new campus at Belfield in the 1960s, part of the building was converted, and reopened as the NCH in 1981.

As a national cultural institution, the NCH falls under the aegis of the Irish Government’s Department of Culture, Communications and Sport, and as such is grant-aided by the government. The NCH is a statutory corporate body, with a management team, and a Government-appointed Board.

== History ==
The history of Earlsfort Terrace, where the National Concert Hall is based, dates back to 1865 when it was originally known as the Exhibition Palace. The Guinness Family purchased the buildings in May 1871, agreeing that ‘popular entertainment’ continue as before for a further ten years. Dublin Musical Society made its debut at the Exhibition Palace in May 1876. On its first visit to Ireland, the Hallé Orchestra gave two concerts at the Exhibition Palace on 26 October 1878. The stone structure and glass and steel Winter Garden proved expensive to run and was later dismantled and sold in May 1882. The Royal University of Ireland occupied the premises from 1883 to 1909. Concerts and small exhibitions continued. The Irish Universities Act 1908 brought the establishment of University College Dublin (UCD) and the RUI was dissolved on 31 October 1909.

Several members of staff and students of UCD were involved in Easter Week 1916 Rising, including Professor Eoin MacNeill and student Richard Mulcahy who became Chief of Staff of the Volunteers (Óglaigh na hÉireann). Thomas MacDonagh, one of the signatories to the Proclamation of the Republic, was a lecturer in English at UCD. He was executed in Kilmainham Jail on 3 May 1916.

The building also has significant links to the War of Independence. A Dublin Corporation scholarship brought Kevin Barry, who had joined the Irish Republican Army in 1917, into UCD’s medical school in 1919. Following the signing of the Anglo-Irish Treaty in London on 6 December 1921, Dáil Éireann met in UCD’s Council Chamber between 14 December and 10 January 1922. Ratification of the Treaty by Dáil Éireann took place in UCD on 7 January 1922 with 64 deputies in favour and 57 against. Final session of Dáil Éireann in UCD took place on 10 January 1922 when Arthur Griffith was elected president of the Dáil.

In 1960 the Irish Government agreed to build a new campus for UCD at Belfield. In 1974 the Government agreed that the Earlsfort Terrace site would be completely renovated to become the National Concert Hall. Work began in May 1978. President Patrick Hillary officially opened the National Concert Hall on 9 September 1981 with the RTÉSO and a number soloists and choirs under Colman Pearce. The Chieftains had the honour of giving the first traditional Irish music concert on 11 September 1981, while pianist John O'Conor gave the first 'solo' recital on the 12 September.

== Programme ==
The International Concert Series is the flagship of the National Concert Hall’s programme.

Other series include the Chamber Music Series which takes place in The Kevin Barry Recital Room and puts on recitals and concerts, ranging from baroque to contemporary music.

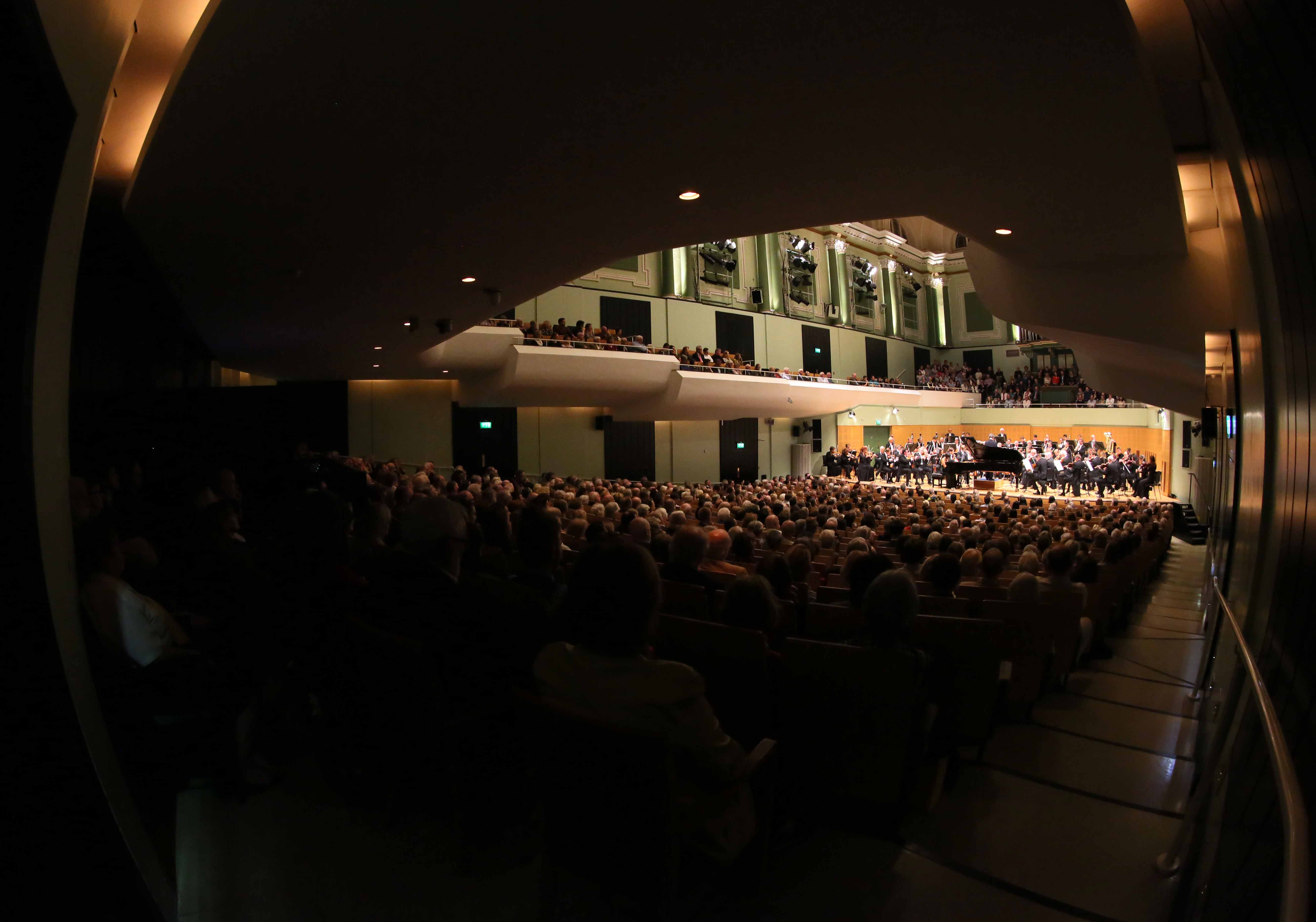
Main Auditorium

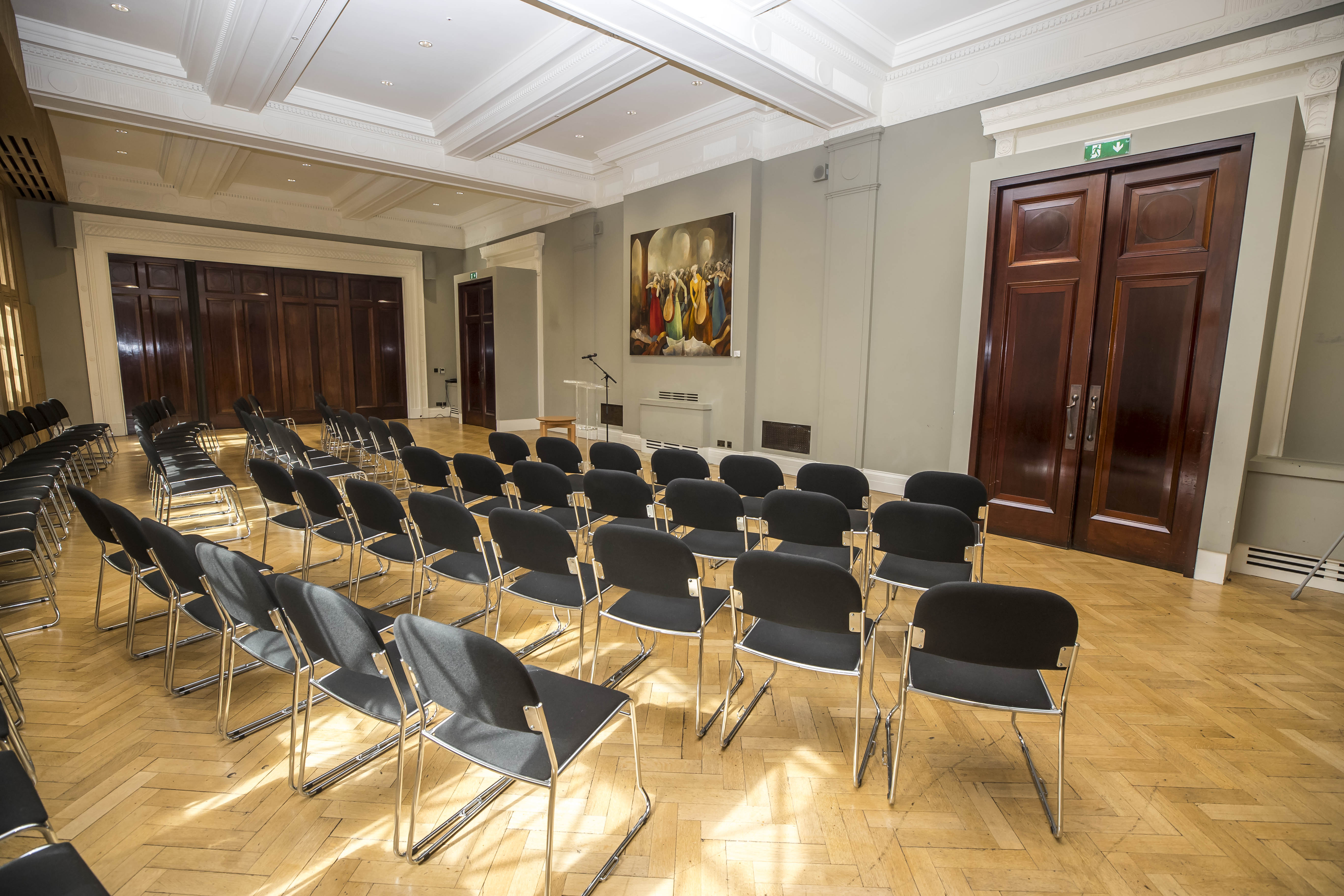
Kevin Barry Recital Room

== Performance Areas ==
- The Main Auditorium, seating 1,200, is used for large scale concerts and some operas.
- The John Field Room, seating 250, is used for small recitals and pre-performance talks.
- The Kevin Barry Recital Room, seating 120, is home to the Chamber Music Series and other small scale recitals. It was opened in 2016.
- The Studio, seating 100, is used for pre-event talks, receptions and corporate functions.

== Resident bodies ==
=== Musical groups ===
==== National Symphony Orchestra Ireland (NSOI) ====
National Symphony Orchestra Ireland was founded in 1948 and is one of Ireland's principal classical music groups. It performs a broad programme of live performances, as well as education and mentoring initiatives. In July 2018, the Government agreed in principle that the RTÉ NSO should come under the remit of the National Concert Hall; this transition was completed in January 2022, as part of this change the NCH also took control of Cór na nÓg, Cór Linn and RTÉ Philharmonic Choir (now National Symphony Chorus Ireland).

==== Irish Baroque Orchestra ====
The Irish Baroque Orchestra performs music from the 17th and 18th centuries; it became an NCH resident in 2013.

==== Chamber Choir Ireland ====
Chamber Choir Ireland is a choral ensemble and the national chamber choir. It has been resident in the NCH since 2012 under the artistic direction of conductor Paul Hillier. The choir's programmes span from the early Renaissance to the present day.

==== Crash Ensemble ====
Crash Ensemble was formed in 1997, described as the ‘Irish new-music collective with international cachet and considerable chops’ by The Washington Post. It has been resident in the NCH since 2014.

=== Other groups ===
==== Music Network ====
A NCH resident since 2013, Music Network is a national music touring and development organisation, founded in 1986 with support from the Arts Council.

==== Music Generation ====
Music Generation is Ireland’s National Music Education Programme, initiated by Music Network and co-funded by U2 and The Ireland Funds, together with the Department of Education and Skills and Local Music Education Partnerships. Like Music Network, it has been an NCH resident since 2013.

=== Writer's Block ===
Writer's Block is a series of creative writing rooms at NCH offering artists space to write, experiment and collaborate. It allows NCH to support artists in the creation of new projects and allow them to contribute to NCH’s programming. As of 2021, Paul Noonan, James Vincent McMorrow, Lisa Hannigan, Ross Turner and Glenn Keating are resident, creating and making new work at NCH. Neil Hannon and Cathy Davey have previously benefitted from this support.

== Redevelopment ==
The redevelopment of the National Concert Hall on Earlsfort Terrace is part of Project Ireland 2040, and is one of the Irish Government's key cultural projects. Plans to develop the site have been in train since the mid-2000s following the purchase of Earlsfort Terrace from UCD for the future redevelopment of the National Concert Hall. Under Project Ireland 2040, the Government has committed to a major investment in the redevelopment of the NCH with the aim of transforming it into the National Centre for the performance of music. The redevelopment programme was due to start construction in 2022, involving the building and performance spaces at Earlsfort Terrace.

== See also ==
- The Helix, opened in 2002 on the campus of Dublin City University, with the main auditorium, the Mahony Hall, a purpose-built 1,260-seat concert hall
- List of concert halls
