= National Symphony Orchestra (Ireland) =

- Radio orchestra
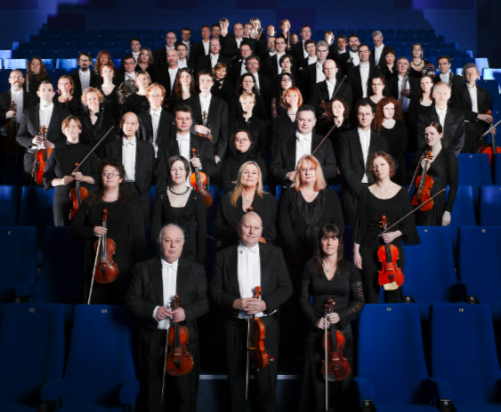
- Former name: Radio Éireann Symphony Orchestra (RESO); RTÉ Symphony Orchestra; RTÉ National Symphony Orchestra
- Founded: 1948; 78 years ago
- Location: Dublin, Ireland
- Principal conductor: Alexander Shelley
- Website: National Symphony Orchestra and Choirs

The National Symphony Orchestra Ireland (NSO Ireland; Irish: Ceolfhoireann Shiansach Náisiúnta Éireann) is the largest professional orchestra in Ireland, housed at the National Concert Hall, Dublin, since January 2022. Previously known as the Radio Éireann Symphony Orchestra, RTÉ Symphony Orchestra and the RTÉ National Symphony Orchestra, the orchestra was formerly the concert and radio orchestra of Raidió Teilifís Éireann (RTÉ), Ireland's public radio station.

== History ==
In 1926, a national radio channel, based in Dublin, began broadcasting. To provide music, it hired staff musicians, who often played together on the radio and in concert as a chamber orchestra. Musicians were frequently hired from the Army School of Music and the Dublin Philharmonic Society (1927–1936) under the direction of Colonel Fritz Brase, head of the Army School of Music since 1923. The original group was gradually expanded during the 1930s and 1940s, when it was known as the Radio Éireann Orchestra, and by 1946 had reached 40 musicians. Early conductors included Vincent O'Brien and, from 1941, Michael Bowles, guest conductors included Aloys Fleischmann and Frederick May. Often called the "Station Orchestra", many (albeit not regular) public concerts were given and broadcast live from venues such as the Mansion House, Metropolitan Hall and Capitol Theatre.

In 1948, the broadcasting authority, now called Radio Éireann, expanded the orchestra to a symphonic size by opening its membership to musicians from all over Europe. Ireland, as a neutral country during World War II, had been spared damage, so musicians from the wrecked economies of a ruined Europe were easy to attract. The new orchestra was named the Radio Éireann Symphony Orchestra (RESO). After Michael Bowles' involuntary retirement (Bowles had objected to recruiting so many foreigners for the 1948 enlargement), the new orchestra worked for a while without a permanent conductor, commissioning major guest conductors instead such as Jean Martinon and Hans Schmidt-Isserstedt. In 1953, the orchestra found a principal conductor in Milan Horvat, who remained until 1956. In 1961, Ireland added television to its broadcasting service. The name of the new organisation was to be Raidió Teilifís Éireann (RTÉ). The orchestra became known as the RTÉ Symphony Orchestra (RTÉSO). By now it was, de facto, the national orchestra of Ireland. Its new chief conductor from 1961 was Tibor Paul. He was succeeded by Albert Rosen, Colman Pearce, Bryden Thomson, and János Fürst.

In 1981, the RTÉSO found a new home when the National Concert Hall opened in Dublin. Also, at about the same time, it expanded its broadcasting activities. Until 1978, RTÉ had only two radio stations and one television channel. In 1978, they established RTÉ2 followed in 1979 by RTÉ Radio 2 (now RTÉ 2fm). Five years later, RTÉ launched an arts radio station called FM3, which shared broadcast space with RTÉ RnaG until 1999 when it rebranded as Lyric FM (now RTÉ Lyric FM).

In 1989, the orchestra was again expanded and renamed the National Symphony Orchestra of Ireland. George Hurst became principal conductor in 1990. Kasper de Roo succeeded Hurst from 1994 to 1998. Alexander Anisimov became the orchestra's principal guest conductor in 1995 and principal conductor in 1998. Gerhard Markson succeeded Anissimov in 2001 and was principal conductor through 2009. Alan Buribayev was the principal conductor of the orchestra from 2010 to 2016, and Nathalie Stutzmann from 2017 to 2019, with Hannu Lintu as the orchestra's principal guest conductor from 2010 and Finghin Collins the orchestra's first-ever Associate Artist.

In September 2016, Jaime Martín first guest-conducted the RTÉ NSO . Following three subsequent return guest-conducting appearances, in January 2018, the RTÉ NSO announced the appointment of Martín as its next chief conductor, effective with the 2019–2020 season, with an initial contract of three years. Martín concluded his RTÉ NSO tenure at the close of the 2023–2024 season.

In September 2025, the NSO Ireland announced the appointment of Alexander Shelley as its next principal conductor, effective with the 2026–2027 season, with an initial contract of three seasons. Shelley took the role of principal conductor-designate with immediate effect.

== Relocation and new status ==
Under increasing financial pressure, in 2018, RTÉ commissioned an independent review of their orchestras. The "Boden Report" outlined several options for the future of both the NSO and RTÉ Concert Orchestra, including the closure of one or other of the orchestras and moving one to the National Concert Hall.

In the Budget 2020, the Irish government announced that the NSO would move to the NCH, with a budget of €8 million being provided by the Department of Culture, Communications and Sport. This took effect on 24 January 2022.

== Principal conductors ==
- Milan Horvat (1953–1956)
- Tibor Paul (1961–1967)
- Albert Rosen (1968–1981)
- Colman Pearce (1981–1983)
- Bryden Thomson (1984–1987)
- János Fürst (1987–1989)
- George Hurst (1990–1993)
- Kasper de Roo (1994–1998)
- Alexander Anisimov (1998–2001)
- Gerhard Markson (2001–2009)
- Alan Buribayev (2010–2016)
- Nathalie Stutzmann (2017–2019)
- Jaime Martín (2019–2024)
- Alexander Shelley (2026–present)

== Bibliography ==
- Pat O'Kelly: The National Symphony Orchestra of Ireland 1948–1998, a Selected History (Dublin: RTÉ, 1998); ISBN 978-0-86029-015-5.
- Patrick Joseph Kehoe: The Evolution of the Radio Éireann Symphony Orchestra, 1926–1954; Ph.D. thesis, Dublin Institute of Technology Conservatory of Music and Drama, 2017).
