= I'll Walk Beside You =

I'll Walk Beside You may refer to

- I'll Walk Beside You (song), a sentimental song associated with John McCormack
- I'll Walk Beside You (film), a 1943 British film directed by Maclean Rogers
