= I'll Walk Beside You (song) =

Song
- Genre: Love song
- Songwriter(s): Alan Murray, Edward Lockton

"I'll Walk Beside You" is a 1936 sentimental love song written by Alan Murray (music) and Edward Lockton (lyrics). It is associated with John McCormack who sang it on a number of occasions. Among the earliest recordings was one by the tenor Walter Glynne. It was also recorded by many other singers, including Vera Lynn, Peter Dawson, Richard Tauber, Webster Booth and John McHugh.

The song was popular in Britain during the Second World War. A 1943 film I'll Walk Beside You was named after it, and featured the tune throughout.

== Bibliography ==
- Cartwright, Jim. John McCormack: A Comprehensive Discography. Greenwood Press, 1986. ISBN 0313247285 OCLC 13156741
