= I'll Walk Beside You (film) =

1943 British film by Maclean Rogers

- Directed by: Maclean Rogers
- Written by: Kathleen Butler; Mabel Constanduros
- Produced by: F.W. Baker
- Starring: Richard Bird; Lesley Brook; Percy Marmont; Leslie Bradley
- Cinematography: Geoffrey Faithfull
- Edited by: Ted Richards
- Music by: Percival Mackey
- Production company: Butcher's Film Service
- Distributed by: Butcher's Film Service
- Release date: 16 August 1943
- Running time: 88 minutes
- Country: United Kingdom
- Language: English

I'll Walk Beside You is a 1943 British drama film directed by Maclean Rogers and starring Richard Bird, Lesley Brook and Percy Marmont. It was written by Kathleen Butler and Mabel Constanduros and produced by Butcher's Film Service.

It takes its name from the song "I'll Walk Beside You" by Alan Murray and Edward Lockton, which is played over the opening credits and used as a refrain throughout.

== Plot ==
Sailor John Brent becomes friendly with Ann Johnson, who shares his tastes in music. When war breaks out, he is believed to be killed at sea, but he survives, and returns wth amnesia. Ann helps him to recover his memory with the help of the song "I'll Walk Beside You."

== Cast ==
- Richard Bird as John Brent
- Lesley Brook as Ann Johnson
- Percy Marmont as vicar
- Leslie Bradley as Tomm Booth
- Sylvia Marriott as Joan Tremayne
- Hugh Miller as Dr. Stevenson
- Beatrice Varley as Miss McKenzie
- Irene Handl as Ma Perkins
- George Merritt as Hancock
- Hilda Bayley as Mrs. Tremayne
- John McHugh as orchestral soloist
- St. David's Singers as vocal ensemble
- London Symphony Orchestra as themselves

== Reception ==
The Monthly Film Bulletin wrote: "This sentimental story is built around the popular ballad 'I'll Walk Beside You'. It may not live up to the inclusion of the London Symphony Orchestra in the credit titles, but it is simply and sincerely produced: Lesley Brook acts naturally, but Richard Bird as John Brent is rather stilted. The rest of the cast is adequate."

Kine Weekly wrote: "Sentimental musical drama, suggested by the popular song, describing the tender yet chequered romance of a working girl and a young Lieutenant-Commander. ... It is at times slightly reminiscent of both Mrs. Miniver and Random Harvest, but, although its aspirations are more ambitious than its technical presentation, it is unquestionably human and sincere. ... Moreover, it crowns its compelling, if unpretentious, contribution to the exclusive gallery of infallible woman's pictures with big title values. It's definitely one for the shrewd family, industrial and provincial showman."

Picture Show wrote: "As you may guess, music plays a large part in the story, and the London Symphony Orchestra's interludes are wholly delightful, as are John McHugh's songs. Lesley Brook gives a charming and convincing portrayal as the girl, and is well supported."
