= Vincent O'Brien (composer) =

Irish organist, music teacher and composer (1871–1948)

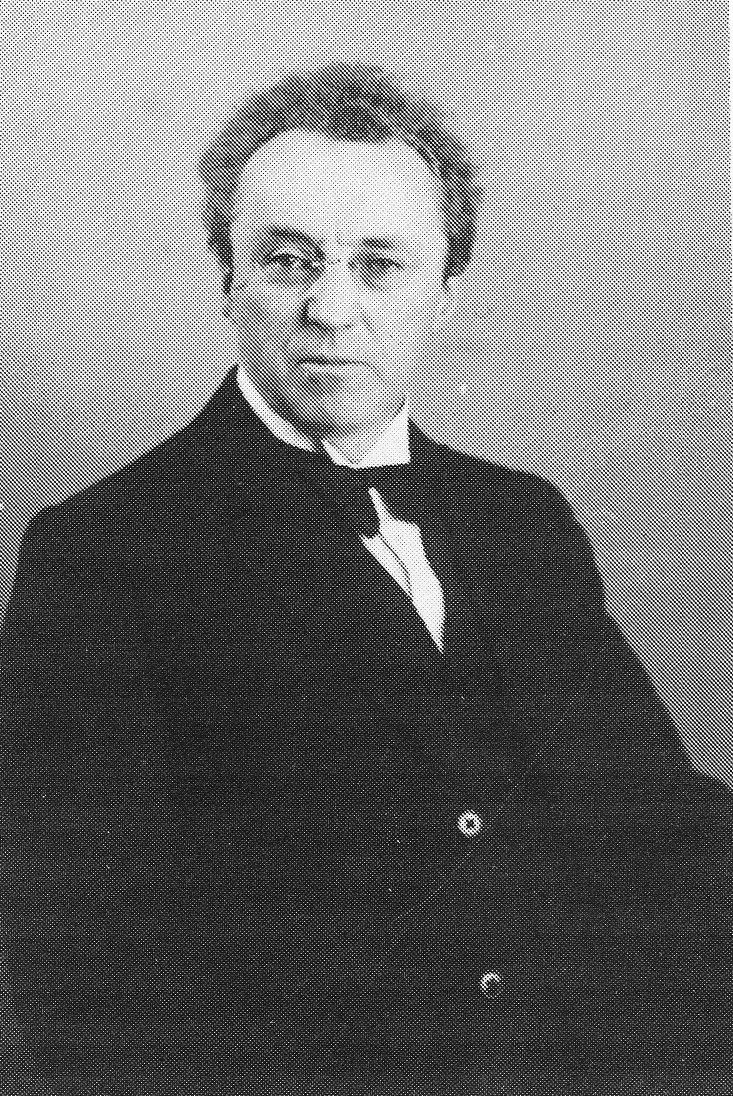
- O'Brien, before 1920
- Born: 9 May 1871; Dublin, Ireland
- Died: 21 June 1948 (aged 77); Dublin, Ireland
- Education: Royal Irish Academy of Music
- Occupations: Organist; composer; music teacher
- Years active: 1885–1948
- Era: Cecilian Movement
- Employers: St Mary's Pro-Cathedral; Radio Éireann; Clonliffe College; All Hallows College; Ladies' Teacher-Training College
- Organizations: Palestrina Choir; Dublin Oratorio Society; Brisan Opera Company; Our Lady's Choral Society
- Style: Roman Catholic liturgical

Vincent O'Brien (9 May 1871 – 21 June 1948) was an Irish organist, music teacher and composer, an important figure in early 20th-century Irish music. For some, he is mainly known as the first teacher of singers such as John McCormack and Margaret Burke Sheridan and the writer James Joyce.

== Life ==
O'Brien was born in Dublin, the eldest child of the Roman Catholic church musician Richard Vincent O'Brien. In 1885, he first appeared in a public piano recital, and later in the year, became the organist of Rathmines parish church (until 1888). He held another organist's position at the Dublin Carmelite church (1897–99), but was chiefly known as organist and choir director of Dublin's largest Roman Catholic Church, St Mary's Pro-Cathedral, between 1903 and 1946. He was the founder (in 1898) and first director of the Palestrina Choir, originally all-male, which is still active, and which was financed for many years by Edward Martyn. O'Brien studied with Robert Prescott Stewart at the Royal Irish Academy of Music, where he was the first winner of the Coulson Scholarship (1888–90) and frequently performed as both tenor singer, piano accompanist, and organist in many public concerts during the 1890s. As a church musician, he became particularly involved in the Cecilian Movement, conducting works by Michael Haller and others, and also pursuing their artistic ideals in his own sacred choral compositions.

He was the founding conductor of the Dublin Oratorio Society (1906) and the Brisan Opera Company (1916) and conducted at many ad hoc events. In 1925, he became the first music director of Radio Éireann (originally called 2RN), a position he held until 1941. He singled out his work as music director for the 1932 Eucharistic Congress as his most prized personal achievement. As late as 1945, he founded Our Lady's Choral Society, a large oratorio choir still in existence, which originally recruited mainly from the various Roman Catholic church choirs in Dublin.

Among his teaching positions, he taught at the diocesan seminary at Clonliffe College, was Professor of Gregorian Chant at the missionary seminary of All Hallows College (from 1903) and Professor of Music at the Ladies' Teacher-Training College at Carysfort Park, Blackrock (County Dublin), from 1908 to his death in Dublin in 1948. As a much-demanded vocal coach, he taught at his home; his best-known pupils included John McCormack, Margaret Burke Sheridan and James Joyce. He performed the piano accompaniments for McCormack's first gramophone recordings and accompanied him during his 1913–4 Australasian tour (60 performances in three months), during which he also gave organ recitals at the Irish-dominated Catholic cathedrals of Sydney and Melbourne.

In 1932, O'Brien received a doctorate honoris causa from the National University of Ireland.

Of his two sons, Oliver O'Brien (1922–2001) largely followed in his father's footsteps, as organist and director of the Palestrina Choir, of Our Lady's Choral Society, music teacher at Carysfort College and as teacher in various Dublin schools. Vincent's other son, Colum O'Brien, was organist in the Pro-Cathedral.

== Music ==
Before his work for the Palestrina Choir, O'Brien's musical interests were very broad, culminating in 1893 in the composition of the full-scale opera Hester. As a church music composer, he followed Cecilian ideals, with a number of hymns, motets and other choral works. He also composed a number of songs for voice and piano, with The Fairy Tree (1930) being a particular favourite of John McCormack's.

== Selected compositions ==
Operas

- Hester (Dublin, May 1893)

Choral

- Oft In the Stilly Night (Thomas Moore) for male choir (1904)
- An Easter Hymn (biblical) for tenor, chorus, organ or orchestra (1910)
- A Lament (An mangaire súgach) for male choir (1913)
- Hymn to Christ the King (E. P. Donnelly) for tenor, mixed chorus, organ (c. 1932)
- Three Motets (biblical) for male choir (c. 1940). Contains: Ecce sacerdos magnus, Justorum animae, Terra tremuit.
- The Crib (R. O'Farachain) for voice, chorus, piano (1943)
- Cór na scol [14 choral pieces ed. from traditional melodies] (c. 1943)

Orchestral

- Gaelic Phantasy (c. 1927)
- Ceol sreath (1940) for piano and string orchestra
- Fáilte don éan (1941) for piano and string orchestra
- Miniature Overture (n.d.)
- Three Irish Tunes (n.d.)

Songs

- A Song for the Pope ('Dr Murray'; 1893)
- The Fairy Fiddler (Nora Hopper; 1929)
- The Fairy Tree (Temple Lane; 1930)
- Baby Aroon (M. O'Brien; 1935)
- Green Isle of Glory (Michael Courtenay Burke; 1938)

== Recordings ==
Historical recordings (gramophone re-issues on CD)

- The Fairy Tree, recorded by John McCormack (tenor) with Edwin Schneider (piano), originally recorded in 1930 on John McCormack: The Minstrel Boy; (ASV Living Era CD AJA 5224, 1997 [CD]).
- Baby Aroon, recorded by John McCormack (tenor) with Edwin Schneider (piano), originally recorded in 1935 on John McCormack: I Hear You Calling Me; (Symposium Records 1166, 1998 [CD]).

Modern recordings

- The Fairy Tree, recorded by Robert White (tenor) with Stephen Hough (piano), on Bird Songs at Eventide; (Hyperion CDA 66818, 1995 [CD]).
- The Fairy Tree, recorded by Bernadette Greevy (mezzo) with Hugh Tinney (piano), on A Sheaf of Songs from Ireland; (Marco Polo 8.225098, 1998 [CD]).

== Bibliography ==
- Daly, Kieran (1995). Catholic Church Music in Ireland, 1878–1903: The Cecilian Reform Movement. Dublin: Four Courts Press. ISBN 978-1-85182-141-9.
- Daly, Kieran (2013). "O'Brien, Vincent". In White, Harry; Boydell, Barra (eds.). The Encyclopaedia of Music in Ireland. Dublin: UCD Press. pp. 743–744.
- Kehoe, Patrick Joseph (2017). The Evolution of the Radio Éireann Symphony Orchestra, 1926–1954 (Theses, Ph.D). Dublin: Dublin Institute of Technology. doi:10.21427/D7DB4W.
- Klein, Axel (1996). Die Musik Irlands im 20. Jahrhundert (in German). Hildesheim: Georg Olms Verlag. ISBN 978-3-487-10196-5.
