= Molineux Stadium =

Football stadium in Wolverhampton, England

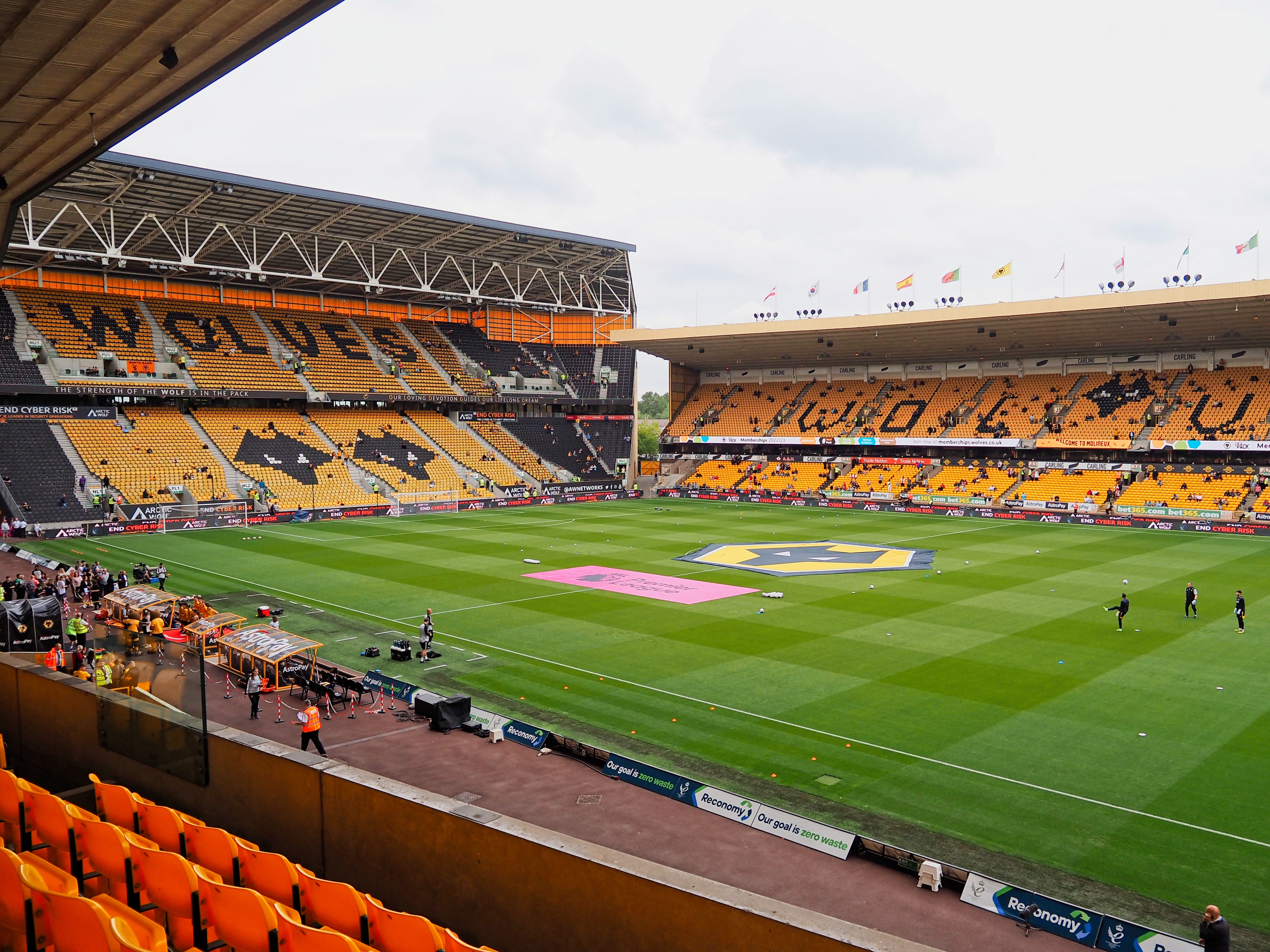
- Molineux Stadium in 2022
- Interactive map of Molineux Stadium
- Full name: Molineux Stadium
- Location: Waterloo Road, Wolverhampton
- Coordinates: 52°35′25″N 2°07′49″W
- Owner: Wolverhampton Council
- Operator: Wolverhampton Wanderers
- Capacity: 31,750
- Surface: Desso GrassMaster
- Field size: 105 by 68 metres (115 by 74 yd)
- Public transit: Wolverhampton St. George's (0.6 mi); Wolverhampton (0.7 mi)

Construction
- Built: 1889
- Opened: 1889
- Renovated: 1978–1979; 1991–1993; 2011–2012
- Architects: Current design - Alan Cotterell Partnership; Redevelopment - AFL
- Main contractors: Current design - Alfred McAlpine; Redevelopment - Buckingham Group

Tenant
- Wolverhampton Wanderers (1889–present)

Website
- events.wolves.co.uk

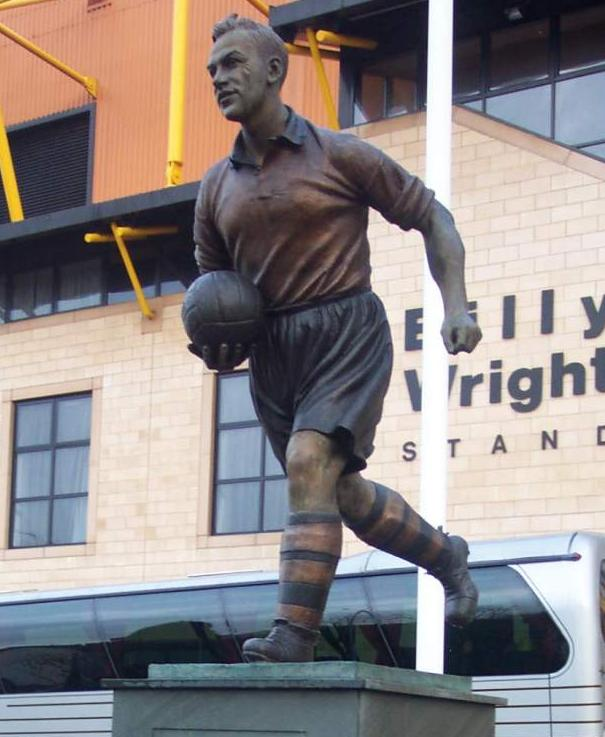
The Billy Wright (1924–1994) statue outside Molineux

Molineux Stadium (/ˈmɒlɪnjuː/ MOL-i-new) is a football stadium situated in Wolverhampton, West Midlands, England. It has been the home ground of EFL Championship club Wolverhampton Wanderers since 1889. The first stadium built for use by a Football League club, it was one of the first British grounds to have floodlights installed and hosted some of the earliest European club games in the 1950s.

At the time of its multi-million pound renovation in the early 1990s, Molineux was one of the biggest and most modern stadia in England, though it has since been eclipsed by other ground developments. The stadium has hosted England internationals and, more recently, England under-21 internationals, as well as the first UEFA Cup Final in 1972.

Molineux is a 31,750 all-seater stadium, but it consistently attracted much greater attendances when it was mostly terracing. The record attendance is 61,315. Plans were announced in 2010 for a £40 million redevelopment programme to rebuild and link three sides of the stadium to increase capacity to 38,000 seats. The first stage of this project, the Stan Cullis Stand, was completed in 2012. The next two stages were postponed because the club prioritised funds for development of the youth academy. There are provisional plans for a longer term redevelopment of every stand that could create a 50,000 capacity.

== Stadium ==
The stadium consists of four stands:

The Steve Bull Stand (formerly the John Ireland Stand).

The Sir Jack Hayward Stand (formerly the Jack Harris Stand and also known as 'The South Bank'), is a single tier, safe standing terrace.

The Stan Cullis Stand (also known as The North Bank) is the most recently renovated stand.

The Billy Wright Stand holds the team dressing rooms, media booths and the family section.

The total seated capacity of the stands is approximately 31,500, with a temporary seating area lifting the present official capacity to 32,050. The current stadium design stems from the early 1990s when it was extensively redeveloped to become a modern all-seater venue in accordance with the Taylor Report, which required British football stadia to provide seating for all those attending.

In the days before seating regulations, the ground could hold more than 60,000 spectators; the record attendance for a match at the ground is 61,315 for a Football League First Division game against Liverpool on 11 February 1939. The 1940s and 1950s saw average attendances for seasons regularly exceed 40,000, coinciding with the club's peak on the field.

Molineux has hosted six England internationals. The first was a 6–1 win over Ireland on 7 March 1891. England again beat Ireland, this time 4–0, on 14 February 1903 and lost to Wales 2–1 on 5 February 1936. The fourth was a 5–2 defeat of Denmark in a 1958 World Cup qualifier on 5 December 1956. In 2022 Molineux hosted a 0-0 Nationals League draw with Italy and a 0–4 defeat to Hungary. It has also hosted four England under-21 internationals (in 1996, 2008, 2014 and 2018) and, in 2005, hosted some European Youth Championship qualifying matches.

On 24 June 2003, Molineux also became Wolverhampton's biggest live concert venue, with Bon Jovi performing in front of 34,000 people.

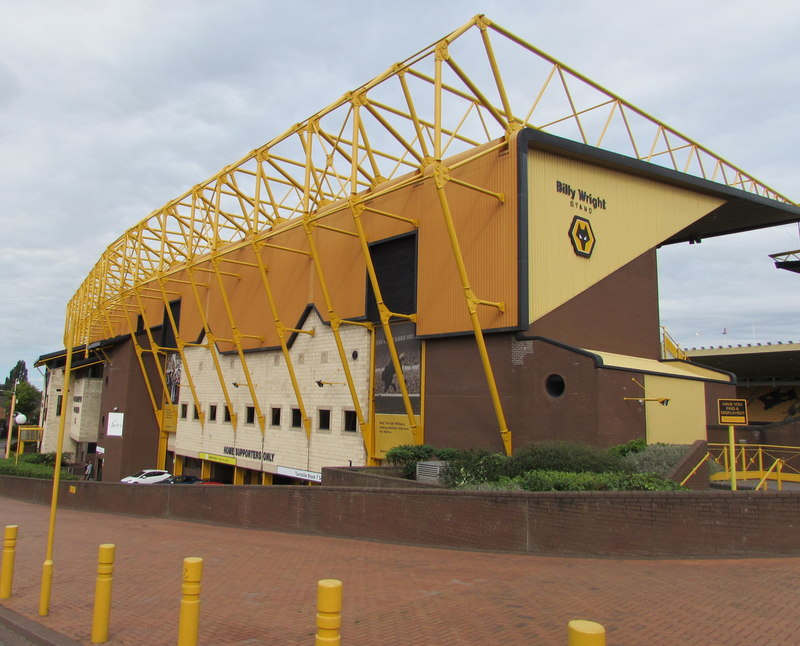
The exterior of the Molineux Stadium

Up until May 2011, the ground had a capacity of 29,400. However the 5,500 Stan Cullis Stand was knocked down for redevelopment and 230 seats in the lower tier of the Steve Bull Stand were taken out as part of the process taking temporary capacity down to 23,670. The lower tier of the new North Bank (holding 4,000) was opened for use in September 2011 for the team's second home game of the season, which took the stadium capacity up to 27,670. The upper tier on the new stand (3,700 seats) was completed by the start of the 2012–13 season, taking the overall capacity of the stadium up to 31,700. However the club have delayed the second phase of the redevelopment in rebuilding the Steve Bull Stand. Following relegation from the top flight in 2012, the South-West Corner was dismantled until regaining promotion six years later.

== History ==
=== Origins ===
The Molineux name originates from Benjamin Molineux, a successful local merchant (and a distant relative of the now extinct Earls of Sefton) who, in 1744, purchased land on which he built Molineux House (later converted to the Molineux Hotel) and on which the stadium would eventually be built. The estate was purchased in 1860 by O.E. McGregor, who converted the land into a pleasure park open to the public. Molineux Grounds, as it was titled, included a wide range of facilities including an ice rink, a cycling track, a boating lake, and, most crucially, an area for football.

The grounds were sold to the Northampton Brewery in 1889, who rented its use to Wolverhampton Wanderers, who had previously played at Dudley Road. After renovating the site, Molineux became the first stadium to be exclusively used as a ground for a football team. The first league game to be played in the stadium was staged on 7 September 1889 in a 2–0 victory over Notts County before a crowd of 4,000.

Wolves bought the freehold in 1923 for £5,607 (£303,338.70 in 2018 prices) and soon set about constructing a major grandstand on the Waterloo Road side (designed by Archibald Leitch). In 1932, the club also built a new stand on the Molineux Street side and followed this by adding a roof to the South Bank two years later. The stadium finally now had four stands, which formed Molineux for the next half-century. The South Bank Stand terraces were one of the largest goal stands in Britain.

In 1953, the club became one of the first in Britain to install floodlights, at a cost of around £10,000 (£274,000 in 2018 prices). The first-ever floodlit game was held on 30 September 1953, as Wolves won 3–1 against South Africa. The referee for this match was Mr. F Read of Willenhall. The addition of the floodlights opened the door for Molineux to host a series of midweek friendlies against teams from across the globe. In the days prior to the formation of the European Cup and international club competitions, these games were highly prestigious and gained huge crowds and interest, the BBC often televising such events. A new taller set of floodlights were later installed in 1957, at a cost of £25,000 (£595,000 in 2018 prices), as the stadium prepared to host its first European Cup games.

=== Further redevelopment and decline ===
In 1958, plans were unveiled to rebuild Molineux into a 70,000 capacity stadium during the early 1960s, but these were rejected by the local council and there were no major changes at the stadium for another 20 years.

The Molineux Street Stand (by now all-seater) failed to meet the standards of the 1975 Safety of Sports Grounds Act. The club set about building a new stand behind the existing one, on land where housing had been demolished. The new stand, designed by architects Atherden and Rutter, had a 9,348 capacity, equipped with 42 executive boxes, although sporting red seats in contrast to the club's traditional colours. When the construction was complete, the old stand lying in front was demolished, leaving the stand some 100 ft from the touchline. This new stand, named the John Ireland Stand (after the then-club president), was opened on 25 August 1979 at the start of a First Division game against Ipswich Town. This was intended as the first phase of a complete reconstruction of the ground, which would have given it a 40,000 capacity by 1984 and made it the first completely rebuilt stadium in postwar league football. However, the John Ireland Stand was the only phase of this project which would become reality. Further redevelopment was still a decade away.

In 1981, plans were unveiled for further redevelopment at the stadium which would have cost more than £4million and involved five-a-side football pitches, indoor and outdoor tennis courts, and an eight-lane running track. However, these were soon scrapped due to rising debts.

The John Ireland Stand (renamed as The Steve Bull Stand in 2003), completed in 1979, had cost £2.5 million (£13,675,000 in 2018 prices) and had been one of the most expensive developments at any football ground in the U.K. The cost of the stand's construction plunged Wolves deep into debt and the club narrowly avoided liquidation in 1982, when it was taken over by a group fronted by former player Derek Dougan.

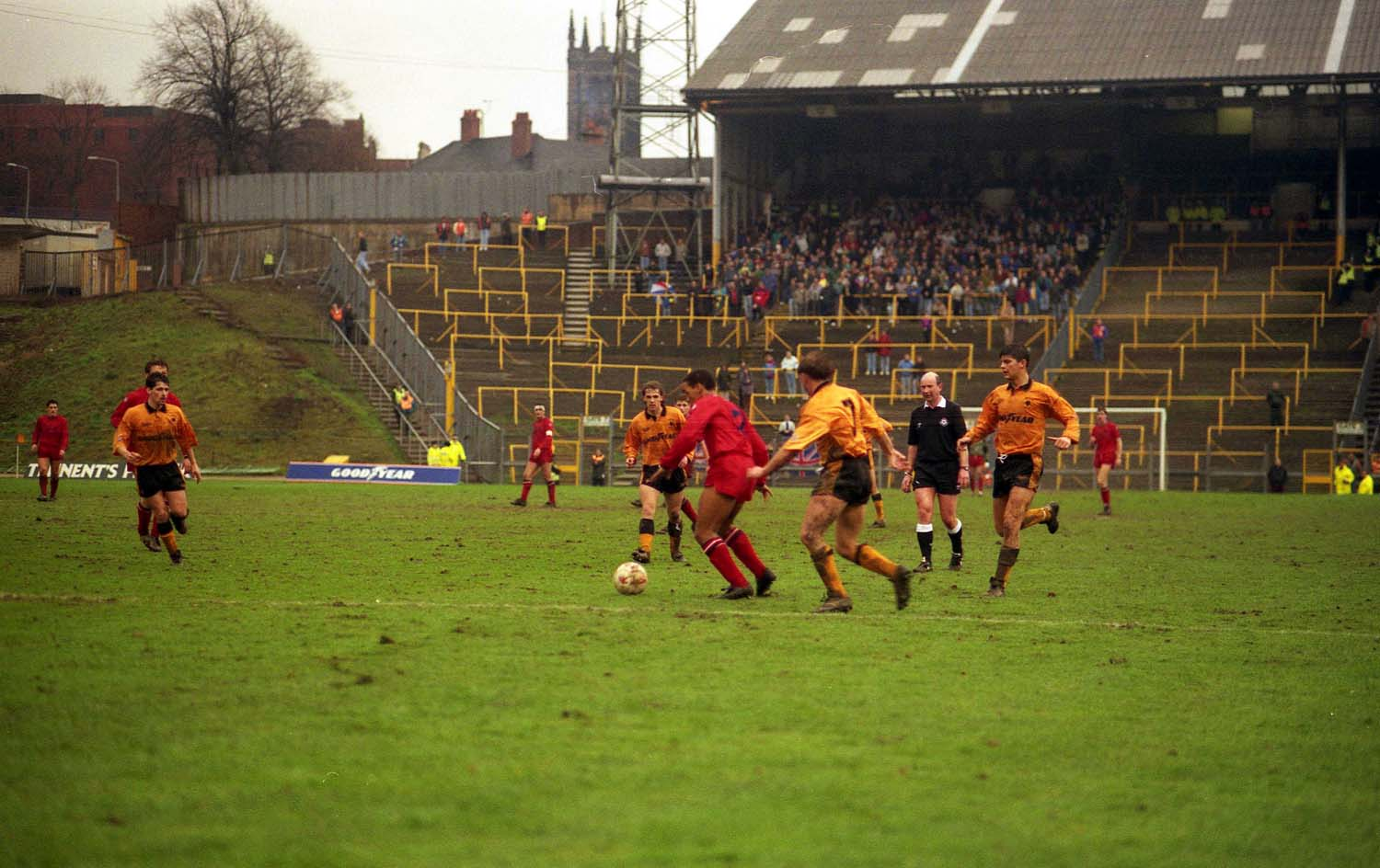
Standing terraces in 1991

By the time Wolves slid into the Football League Fourth Division in 1986, the John Ireland Stand and the South Bank terrace were the only sections of the ground in use, after new safety laws implemented following the Bradford City stadium fire forced the closure of the North Bank and Waterloo Road Stand, which had become very dilapidated. Additionally, attendances had fallen due to the club's on-the-field decline.

The club's perilous financial situation meant the stadium fell into ruin, with no funding either for repairs or to move the pitch. The club was saved from folding in August 1986 when Wolverhampton Council bought the ground for £1,120,000 (£3,236,800 in 2018 prices), along with the surrounding land, while Gallagher Estates, in conjunction with the Asda Superstore chain, agreed to pay off the outstanding debt – subject to building and planning permission for a superstore being granted. Although the stadium continued in use, the disused sections were never reopened.

=== Present-day stadium ===
The takeover of the club and stadium by Sir Jack Hayward in 1990 paved the way for redevelopment, which was further prompted by legislation following the Taylor Report that outlawed terraces which affected Premier League and Division One stadiums from the 1993–94 season. The North Bank terrace was demolished in October 1991 and the new Stan Cullis Stand was completed in August 1992, in time for the 1992–93 season. Next came the demolition of the Waterloo Road Stand, with the new Billy Wright Stand opening in August 1993. The final phase of the redevelopment came in December 1993, when the new Jack Harris Stand was opened on the site of the South Bank terrace.

The newly renovated stadium was officially opened on 7 December 1993, in a friendly with Honvéd, the Hungarian team who had been beaten in one of Molineux's most famous original floodlit friendlies.

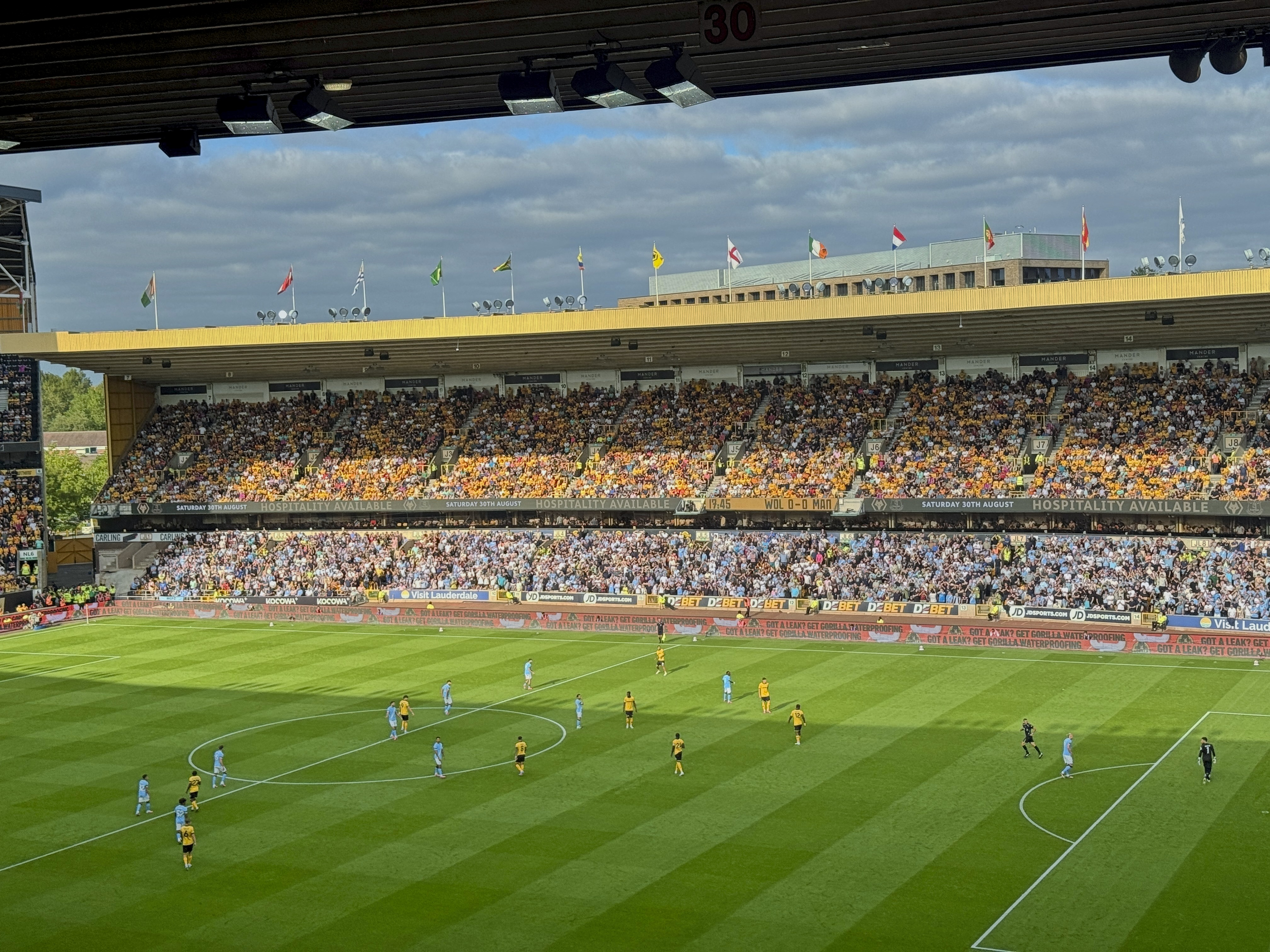
Steve Bull stand, Molineux Stadium, 2025

In 2003, the John Ireland Stand was renamed the Steve Bull Stand (in honour of the club's record goalscorer) and, at the same time, the south-west corner of the ground was filled with 900 temporary seats, known as the Graham Hughes Stand, which, until their removal in the summer of 2006, raised the Molineux capacity to 29,400. This seating area – now officially named the Wolves Community Trust Stand – was again added on the club's return to the top flight in 2009, which lifted the capacity to 29,195 before the club began its redevelopment of the stadium in summer 2011. In August 2015, the Jack Harris Stand was renamed the Sir Jack Hayward Stand in honour of Steve Morgan's predecessor as the club's owner, who had died earlier that year.

The record attendance for the stadium in its current configuration is 31,746, which was achieved against Liverpool on 23 January 2020 in the Premier League.

== Current redevelopment ==
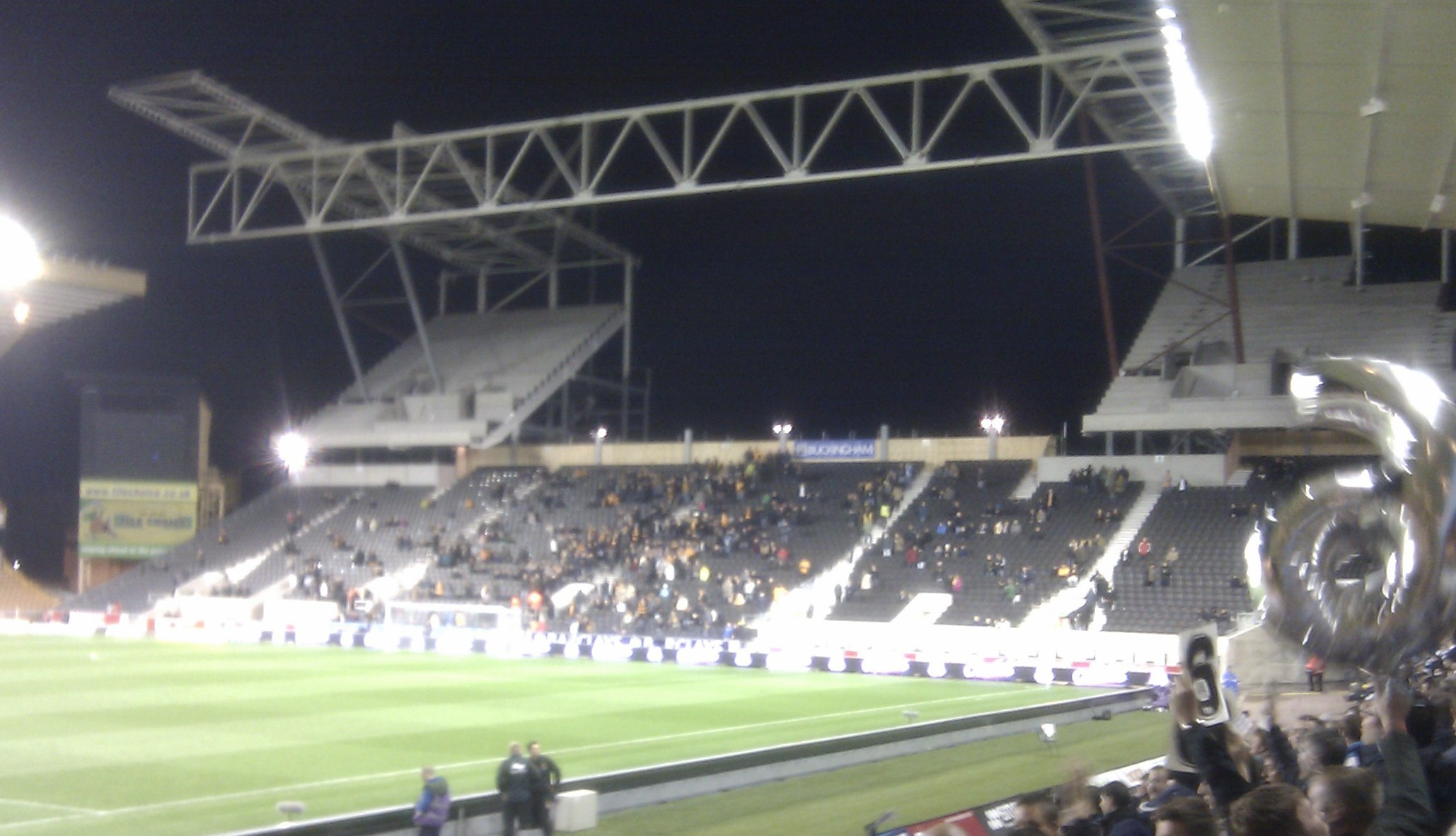
The partially built Stan Cullis stand in October 2011

Plans were announced in May 2010 to begin an extensive multi-million pound programme of redevelopment to enlarge the stadium's capacity and develop its facilities. A full application for planning permission was submitted in September 2010, and granted three months later.

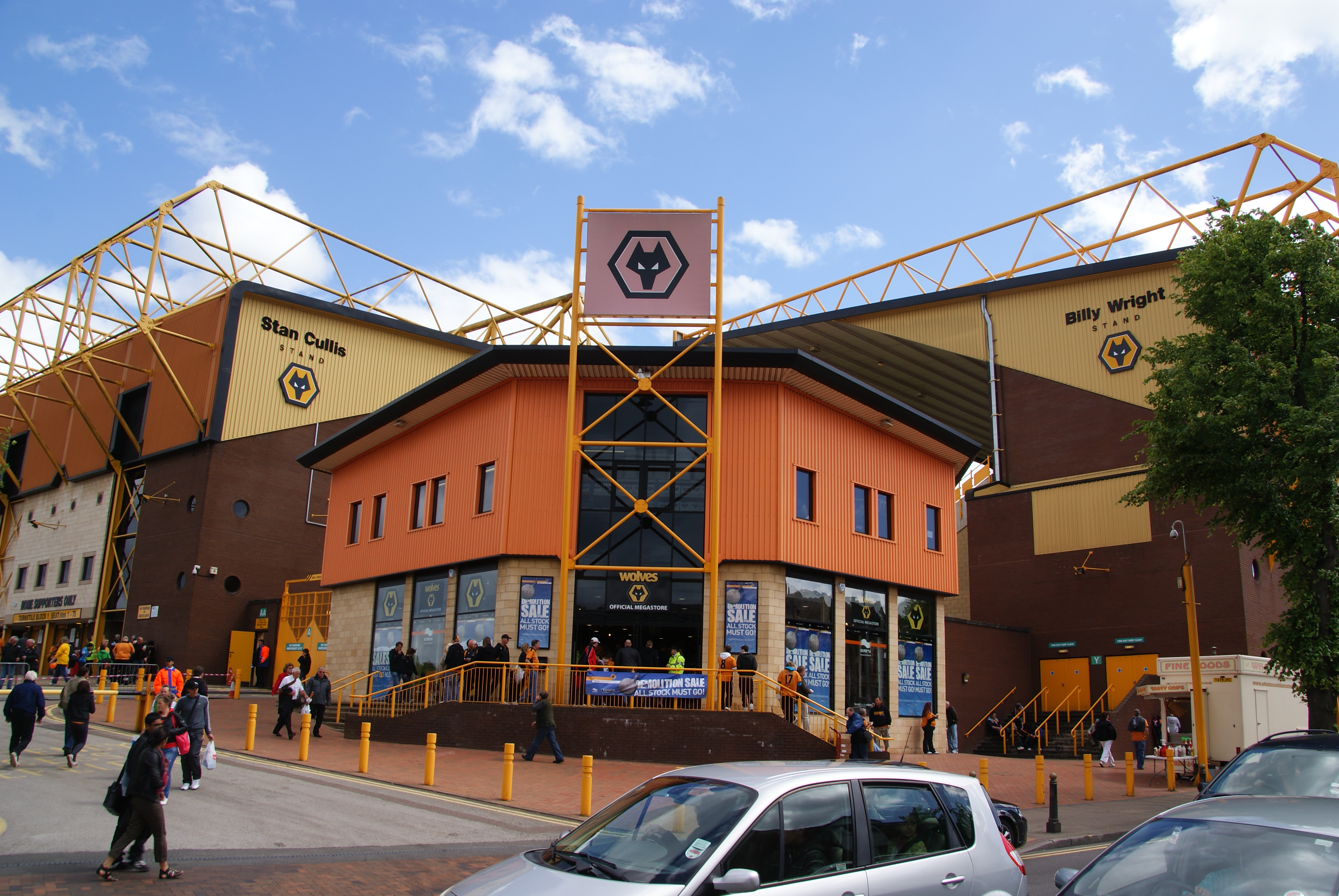
Wolves mega-store

Phase 1 of this process was confirmed in February 2011, and commenced on 23 May 2011 as demolition of the Stan Cullis Stand began. In its place a new two-tier stand (seating 7,798), complete with mega-store, museum, café and hospitality facilities, was planned for the 2012–13 season which extended around into the north-east corner.

This phase, costing an estimated £18 million, was carried out by contractors the Buckingham Group. By September 2011 the lower tier was opened to fans, permitting a temporary stadium capacity of 27,828. The stand was fully opened on 11 August 2012 for the club's first fixture of the 2012–13 season, creating a new official stadium capacity of 31,700.

Phase 2 will be the rebuilding of the Steve Bull Stand over a two-season period. Work was initially set to begin in summer 2012, but has since been postponed with no revised start date yet set. In January 2013 club owner Steve Morgan stated the club would prioritise the redevelopment of its academy facilities over the stadium. At the conclusion of this stage stadium capacity would reach around 36,000 and see this stand connected to the new Stan Cullis Stand. Proceeding with this second stage would raise the redevelopment spend to in excess of £40 million.

Phase 3 is subject to demand and finance, but is planned to be the construction of a new top-tier on the Sir Jack Hayward Stand, that will connect it to the new Steve Bull Stand. This would bring capacity up to around 38,000.

Phase 4 is a tentative plan to completely redevelop the Billy Wright Stand in a move that would bring capacity to 50,000. However, no planning permission has yet been sought for this phase and it remains only a potential, rather than planned, development with no timeframe in place.

== Average attendances ==
Tenants	Tier	League season	Home games	Average attendance
Wolverhampton Wanderers	1st	2023-24	19	31,029
Wolverhampton Wanderers	1st	2022-23	19	31,345
Wolverhampton Wanderers	1st	2018-19	19	31,030
Wolverhampton Wanderers	2nd	2017-18	23	28,298
Wolverhampton Wanderers	2nd	2016-17	23	21,570
Wolverhampton Wanderers	2nd	2015-16	23	20,157
Wolverhampton Wanderers	2nd	2014-15	23	22,419
Wolverhampton Wanderers	3rd	2013-14	23	20,879
Wolverhampton Wanderers	2nd	2012-13	23	21,773
Wolverhampton Wanderers	1st	2011-12	19	25,682

== See also ==
- Development of stadiums in English football
- Football in England
- Lists of stadiums
- Molineux Hotel

== Bibliography ==
- Matthews, Tony (2008). Wolverhampton Wanderers: The Complete Record. Derby: Breedon Books. ISBN 978-1-85983-632-3.
