= Song o' My Heart =

1930 film

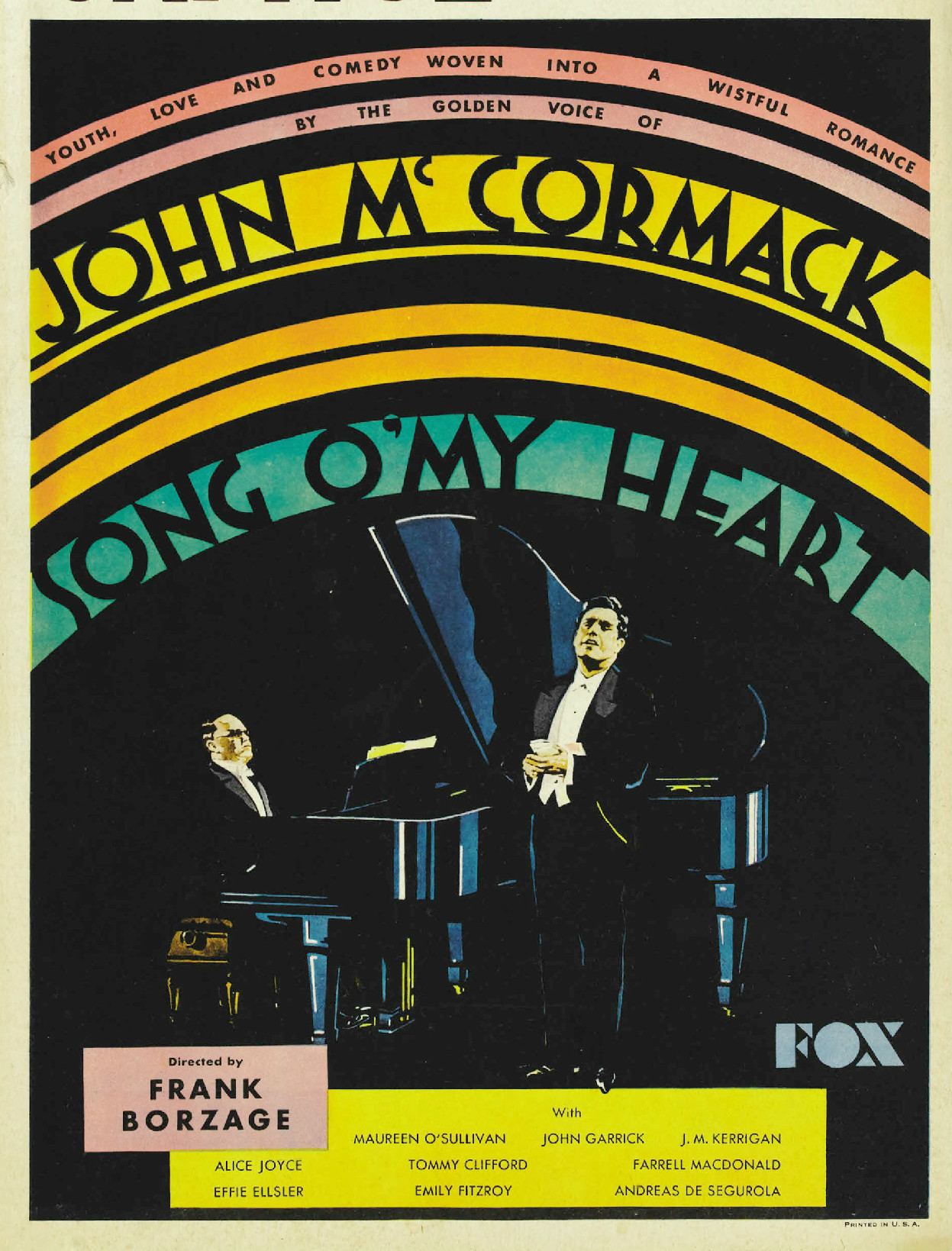
- Window card poster
- Directed by: Frank Borzage
- Written by: Tom Barry; Sonya Levien
- Produced by: Frank Borzage
- Starring: John McCormack; Alice Joyce; Maureen O'Sullivan
- Cinematography: Chester A. Lyons; J.O. Taylor
- Edited by: Margaret Clancey
- Music by: George Lipschultz
- Production company: Fox Film Corporation
- Distributed by: Fox Film Corporation
- Release date: September 7, 1930
- Running time: 85 minutes
- Country: United States
- Language: English
- Box office: $1.2 million

Song o' My Heart is a 1930 American pre-Code romance film directed by Frank Borzage and starring John McCormack, Alice Joyce, Maureen O'Sullivan, Effie Ellsler and John Garrick. It was O'Sullivan's second film role.

The film was double-shot in both conventional 35mm and the early 70 mm Grandeur film widescreen format. Very few theaters were equipped with the necessary projection equipment to show it in the latter and it was never released in that format.

== Plot ==
Song o' My Heart (1930)

Sean O'Carolon has retired as an Irish tenor to a village where an old love of his, Mary, resides with her children, Eileen and Tad. A once-famous opera singer, Sean has given up his career to live in his old Irish village, near Mary, who had been forced to marry someone else "for money, not love". Mary, now abandoned and with two children, struggles in poverty, and lives in the home of a horrid relation. Sean decides to resume his career as a concert singer, presumably (but not stated) to help Mary and perhaps resume their relationship. On tour in America, however, Sean learns that Mary has died. He decides to cut short his tour and return to Ireland to support Mary's children, and Eileen's marriage to her true love.

== Cast ==
- John McCormack as Sean
- Alice Joyce as Mary
- Maureen O'Sullivan as Eileen
- Tommy Clifford as Tad
- John Garrick as Fergus
- Effie Ellsler as Mona
- J. M. Kerrigan as Peterr
- J. Farrell MacDonald as Rafferty
- Emily Fitzroy as Aunt Elizabeth
- Edwin Schneider as Vincent
- Andrés de Segurola as Guido
- Edward Martindel as Fullerton

== Production ==
Edwin Schneider, McCormack's real piano accompanist, plays the part of Sean's piano accompanist in the film. A lengthy segment of the movie is given over to an actual concert, purportedly in New York City but actually filmed on location in Philharmonic Auditorium in downtown Los Angeles, a massive auditorium of the old "Hippodrome" variety.

The director, Frank Borzage, was the Academy Award winner for direction in 1927 (Seventh Heaven).
