= Our Lady's Choral Society =

Irish Catholic choir

Our Lady's Choral Society is an Irish choir founded in 1945, composed of members of Catholic church choirs in the Roman Catholic Archdiocese of Dublin. It was founded by Vincent O'Brien, the composer and director of music at St. Mary's Pro-Cathedral, Dublin. Vincent O'Brien was succeeded as musical director by his son Oliver, and in 1979 Oliver O'Brien was succeeded by Proinnsías Ó Duinn (conductor of the RTÉ Concert Orchestra). Every year the choir performs Handel's Messiah, in Fishamble Street, Dublin, commemorating the first performance.

In 1950, the OLCS also performed The Messiah in Rom. In 1961, invited by Princess Grace and Prince Rainier, the society led by Fr. Andrew Griffith visited Monaco, where it was conducted by the Romanian conductor Constantin Silvestri. In 2009, the choir was invited by Pope Benedict to perform in the Vatican, which was recorded and broadcast by RTÉ on TV and radio at Easter 2009.

== Recordings ==
- Ireland, Mother Ireland, Our Lady's Choral Society, Radio Éireann Symphony Orchestra, Bernadette Greevy and Harold Gray, conducted by Col. James Doyle, Argo RG 434 (LP, 1965).
- Let Erin remember, Our Lady's Choral Society, Radio Éireann Light Orchestra, Bernadette Greevy and Harold Gray, conducted by Col. James Doyle, Argo RG 460 (LP, 1965).
- Georg Friedrich Handel – Messiah, Our Lady's Choral Society, RTÉ Concert Orchestra, conducted by Proinnsías Ó Duinn (self-produced double CD, 2002).
