= When My Ships Come Sailing Home =

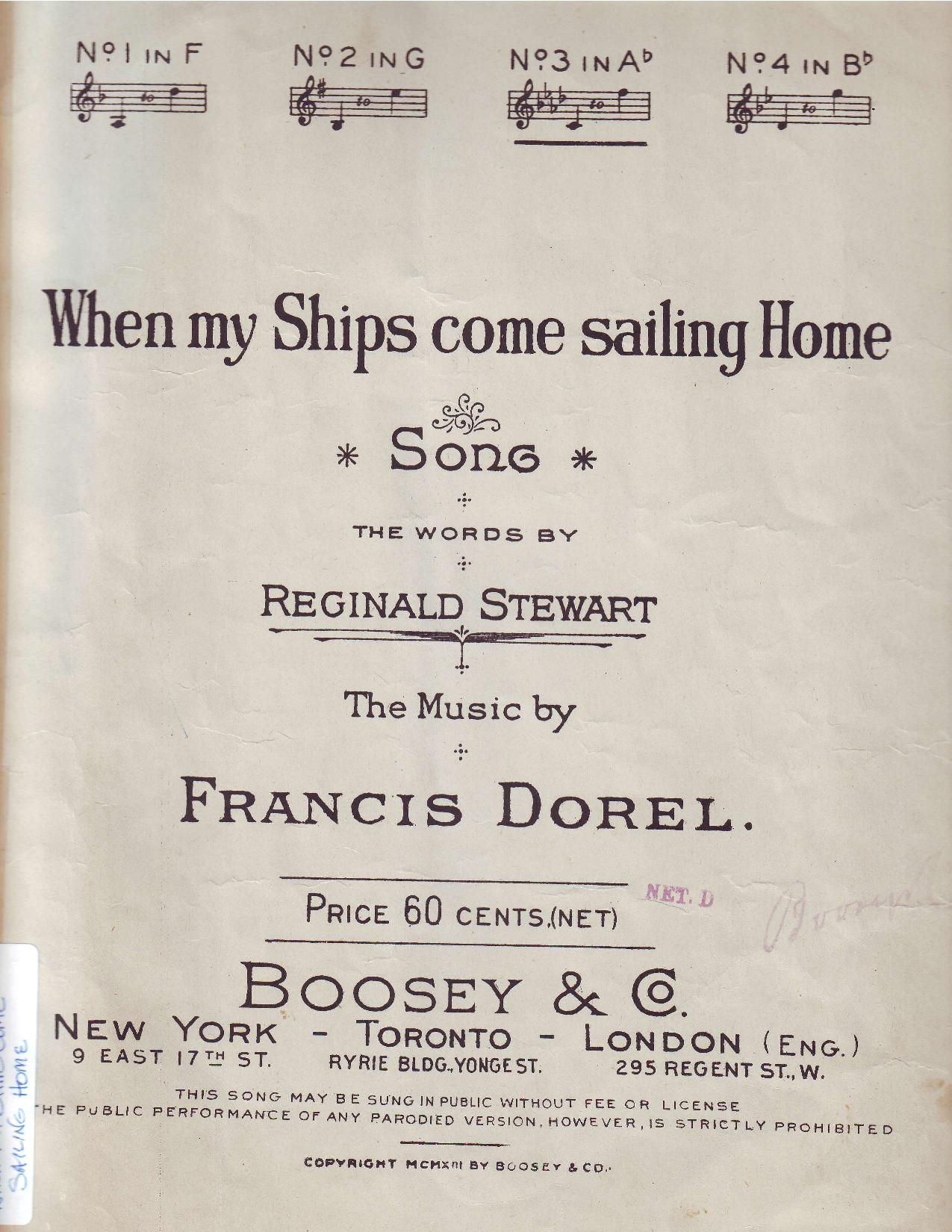
- Original sheet music cover for the A-flat version

Song by John McCormack
- Published: 1913
- Released: 1915
- Recorded: March 29, 1915
- Label: Victor Red Seal
- Composer(s): Francis Dorel
- Lyricist(s): Reginald Stewart

"When My Ships Come Sailing Home" is an American song composed by Francis Dorel and lyrics by Reginald Stewart. The sheet music for the song was distributed as early as 1913 by Boosey & Co, one of the forerunners of the Boosey & Hawkes publishing firm.

The song was recorded by John McCormack representing the Victor label on March 29, 1915. The song failed to peak on American charts during that year.

== Lyrics ==
In my dreams, fairy dreams
When the shadows begin to fall
Oh come to me, come to me
For the night breathes a spell overall
In my dreams, fairy dreams,
Through the garden of love we shall roam
And life shall be fill'd with fairest roses
When e'er my ships come sailing home.

Oh, the ships of my dreams are returning,
My love, my love,
And the bright star of hope is burning,
Up above, up above
For your kiss of desire I am yearning,
Sweet heart, dear heart,
Stars shine from the skies,
There's love in your eyes
When my ships come sailing home.

O'er the sea, Fair and free,
Safe at anchor I see them ride:
They shall stay, all the day,
While the breeze croons a song to the tide
They have brought, all I sought,
All the treasure I need, rich and rare,
And love is that treasure they are bringing
For me and you my lady fair!

Oh, the ships of my dreams are returning,
My love, my love,
And the bright star of hope is burning,
Up above, up above
For your kiss of desire I am yearning,
Sweet heart, dear heart,
Stars shine from the skies,
There's love in your eyes
When my ships come sailing home.

== Sheet Music ==
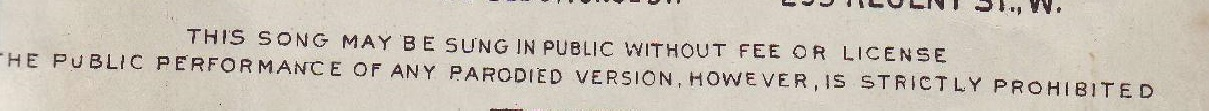
Zoomed-in view of the stipulation on the lower part of the cover

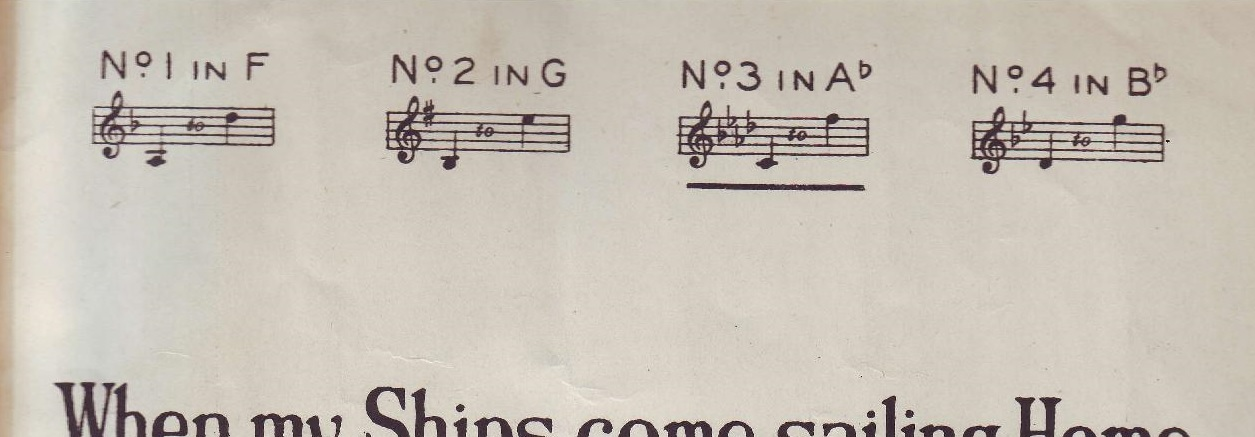
A close up of how one would distinguish between music in different keys. Note the line under the "A flat" bar, marking this piece of sheet music as an "A flat" piece, rather than one of the other three.

The original sheet music is scored for vocals and piano. According to the sheet music, one is supposed the play the song "Slowly and Evenly". The composer attempts to emphasize this fact with note telling the player that certain parts are meant to be played "dreamily". The time signature of the piece is set as common time, or 4:4. It was produced and distributed by Boosey & Co. in 1913, with a stipulation along the bottom of the cover stating that "This song may be sung in public without fee or license. The public performance of any parodied version, however, is strictly prohibited". Four versions of sheet music were distributed; the first version was in the key of "F", the second in the key of "C", the third version in the key of "A flat", and the fourth version in the key of "B flat". One would be able to differentiate the different versions by looking at the top of the sheet music cover. The four version would be pictured side by side, and the one that was enclosed would have a line underneath it.

== Recordings ==
The song was first recorded by John McCormack for the Victor "Red Seal" record label on March 29, 1915. The recording was made in Camden, New Jersey, with the second take kept as the master copy for distribution. McCormack's recording did not place in American charts that year. The Victor matrix number of his recording is kept as "C-15839". Various copies of McCormack's recording are available on YouTube.

Further recordings were made by Herbert Witherspoon, Ethel Whiteside, Franklin Booth, each for the Victor recording label.

Witherspoon recorded his version of the song on September 18, 1917, in Camden. Both takes of his recordings, however, were scrapped. The Victor matrix number of his recordings is kept as "B-20676".

Ethel Whiteside's recording differed from the previous two in that it was not made with orchestral accompaniment. Instead, Whiteside was accompanied by piano. Whiteside's first take recorded on November 6, 1919, was discarded and currently it is unknown if it survives. The Victor matrix number of her recording is kept as "Trial 1919-11-06-02".

The final recording of the song was made by Franklin Booth on May 26, 1925. Like Whiteside, Booth was accompanied by piano rather than orchestra. Of Booth's two takes, the first one was used as the master for distribution while the second was discarded. The Victor matrix number of his recording is kept as "CVE-32825".
