= The Garden of Your Heart =

"In the Garden of Your Heart"
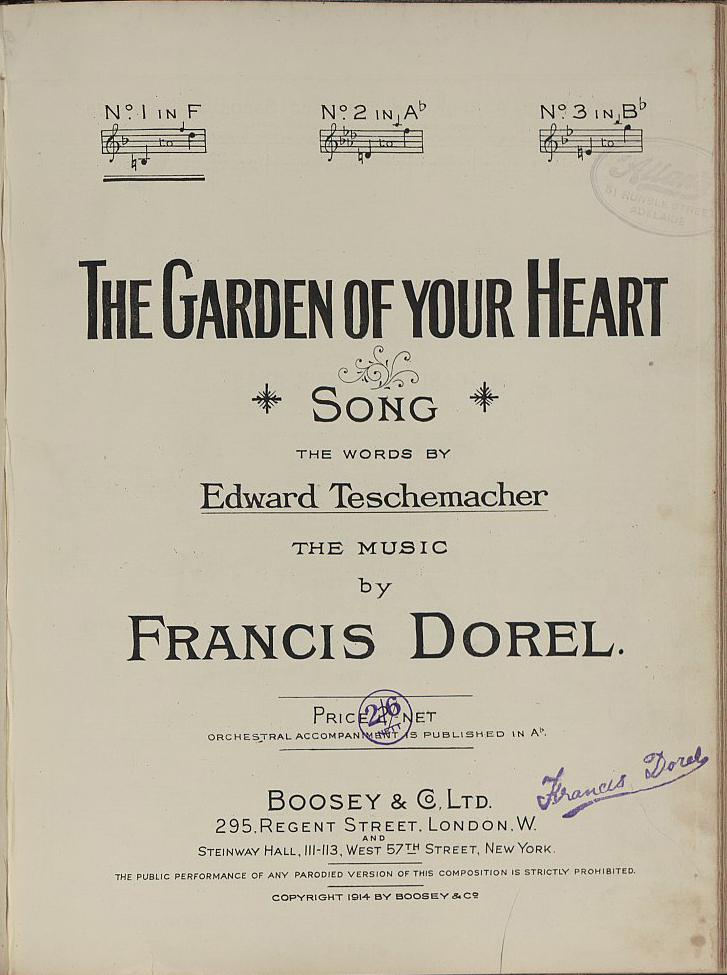
- Sheet music cover, 1914

Song by Charles Harrison
- Recorded: 1916
- Label: Columbia
- Composer(s): Francis Dorel
- Lyricist(s): Edward Teschemacher

"The Garden of Your Heart" is a song composed by Francis Dorel and Edward Teschemacher. The first and only known recording was by American tenor Charles Harrison in 1916 for Columbia Records. This song is mentioned in the ragged trousered philanthropist, a book from 1913, being played on a Polyphone, a very early type of Jukebox

== Music and recordings ==
The song was published by Boosey & Co. in 1914, once more with the provision that while the music could be performed publicly without charge or copyright infringement, all public parodies of the song were strictly forbidden. The music was published in three versions, the first being in the key of "F", the second in the key of "A flat", and the third in the key of "B flat", and included notation for vocals with piano accompaniment. The music was arranged in common time and spanned six pages.

The only known recording released to the public, according to the Discography of American Historical Recordings, was made by American tenor Charles W. Harrison on August 31, 1916. The Columbia Matrix number of the recording is given as "46991".

The song was recorded on two other occasions, once on July 8, 1916, by Blanche Herrick, and once more on March 21, 1917, by a Mrs. C. W. Dodge. Both of these recordings were made for the Victor record label, and both of the recordings have matrixes listed as [TRIAL] followed by the date of their recording. Along with the unknown status of the recordings denoted by the website, it is likely that both recordings were discarded.
