= Calling Me Home to You =

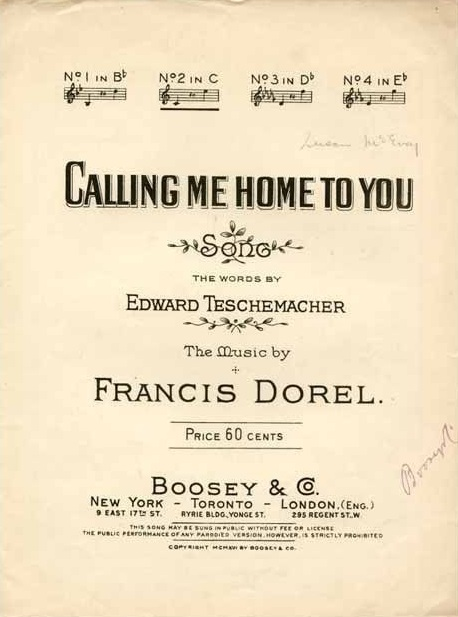
- Original Sheet Music Cover

Song by Alfred De Manby
- Released: 1916
- Recorded: May 31, 1916
- Length: 2:14
- Label: Columbia
- Composer(s): Francis Dorel
- Lyricist(s): Edward Teschemacher

"Calling Me Home To You" is an American song written by Edward Teschemacher and composed by Francis Dorel. The song was first recorded on May 31, 1916, by Alfred De Manby, a baritone vocalist, for Columbia Records.

== Recording and commercial success ==
The score was mentioned in the "New Music —Vocal and Instrumental" section of Musical America in November 1916 as a new ballad by Boosey & Co. In 1917, the sheet music for Dorel's Calling Me Home to You was described by Billboard as being "still one of the most appealing ballads".

Calling Me Home to You was recorded along with "My Irish Song of Songs", "Little Mother of Mine", and "God be with our boys tonight" by John McCormick for Victor "Red Seal" records on April 30, 1918. The former three songs required two takes each, with the latter requiring only one. Both Little Mother of Mine and God Be with our Boys Tonight by McCormack charted #3 on US charts in 1918, with McCormack's renditions of Calling Me Home to You and My Irish Song of Songs both failing to chart. Calling You Home to Me was McCormack's third recording of a composition by Francis Dorel, the first two recordings being When My Ships Come Sailing Home in 1915 and Love Bells in 1916. Neither When My Ships Come Sailing Home nor Love Bells succeeded on American Charts in their respective years.

A prior recording of Calling Me Home to You sung by Oscar Seagle in March charted #4 on US charts that same year. The flip side of Seagle's rendition included a recording of There's a Long, Long Trail which Seagle recorded with the Columbia Stellar Quartette.

Another performer who is known for having this song in their repertoire is Topliss Green.
