= Edward Teschemacher =

British lyricist (1876–1940)

- Also known as: Edward Frederick Lockton
- Born: Edward Frederick Teschemacher; 5 February 1876; Highbury, Middlesex
- Died: 15 May 1940 (aged 64) Hendon, Middlesex
- Occupations: lyricist translator arranger librettist
- Years active: ~1900–1939

Edward Frederick Teschemacher (5 February 1876–15 May 1940), was a prolific writer of song lyrics (about 2300 songs, according to The World Almanac and Book of Facts). He was born at Highbury, Middlesex, England and he was educated at Giggleswick School, Settle, North Yorkshire.

== Name change ==
In November 1914, Teschemacher announced that from 13 November, he wished to be known and addressed as Edward Frederick Lockton.

== Other work ==
Beside his work as a song lyricist, he also worked as a translator, arranger, librettist responsible for writing or co-writing a number of well-known pieces, including "Because" (music composed by Guy d'Hardelot) (1902) and "I'll Walk Beside You" (music composed by Alan Murray) (1939). Teschemacher wrote much of his lyrics for popular music between 1900 and the late 1920s. His work as a translator includes translating "Mattinata" (music by Leoncavallo) from Italian to English (new title "Tis the Day") in 1904, translating a series of folksongs from Norwegian and Danish to English in 1906, and translating the "Mariae Wiegenlied" (The Virgin's Slumber Song) from German to English in 1917.

== Lyrical works published as Edward Teschemacher ==
- "Farewell to Summer" – 1900
- "Because" – 1900
- "The Little Irish Girl" – 1903
- "I Know a Lovely Garden" – 1903
- "Mattinata" – 1904 (translated from Italian)
- "Songs of the Norseland" – 1906 (a collection of Danish and Norwegian folk songs translated by Teschemacher, with music by Hermann Löhr)
- "Tommy Lad!" – 1907
- "Romany Songs" – 1909 (a collection of songs with music by Hermann Löhr and lyrics by Teschemacher and Arthur Cleveland)
- "Until" – 1910
- "Where My Caravan Has Rested" – 1910
- "Your Heart Will Call Me Home" – 1912
- "Sweetest Rose That Ever Bloomed" – 1912
- "What Would the Roses Say?" – 1912
- "The Bells of Burmali" (from Songs of the Orient) – 1912
- "Eyes That Used to Gaze in Mine" – 1912
- "Those Sad Blue Eyes" – 1912
- "The Voyagers" – 1912
- "The Call of the Homeland" – 1912
- "Life and Love" – 1912
- "Lily of My Heart" – 1912
- "Rose of Mine" – 1912
- "The Clasp of a Hand" – 1912
- "I Looked Into Your Heart" – 1912
- "Absence" – 1912
- "The Dawn" – 1912
- "The Little Shawl of Blue" – 1913
- "Trusting Eyes" – 1913
- "Shipmates O' Mine" – 1913
- "Serenade Espagnole" – 1914
- "Night and Dawn" – 1914
- "I Wonder If Love Is a Dream" – 1914
- "Stars That Light My Garden" – 1915
- "Go For A Soldier" – 1915
- "Golden Bird" – 1915
- "Out of the Silence" – 1915
- "Come and See the Roses" – 1915
- "Those Eyes of Blue" – 1915
- "The Blackbird Sings to You" – 1915
- "Fairies from the Moon" – 1915
- "O Flower Divine" – 1915
- "Love's Silent Song" – 1915
- "Oh May My Dreams Come True" – 1915
- "Your Voice" – 1915
- "Come to Me, Morna" – 1915
- "God's Beautiful Valley" – 1915
- "This Rose of Mine" – 1915
- "Dear Little Girl Named You" – 1915
- "Fairlie/Mable Browning" – 1915 (words by Teschemacher and E.W. Anderson)
- "Golden Bird" – 1915
- "Secret of My Heart" – 1915
- "Calling Me Home to You" – 1916
- "No Voice but Yours" – 1916
- "The Garden of Your Heart" – 1917
- "Garden of Summer" – 1920
