= Wolverhampton City Archives =

Coordinates: 52.588596°N 2.130469°W

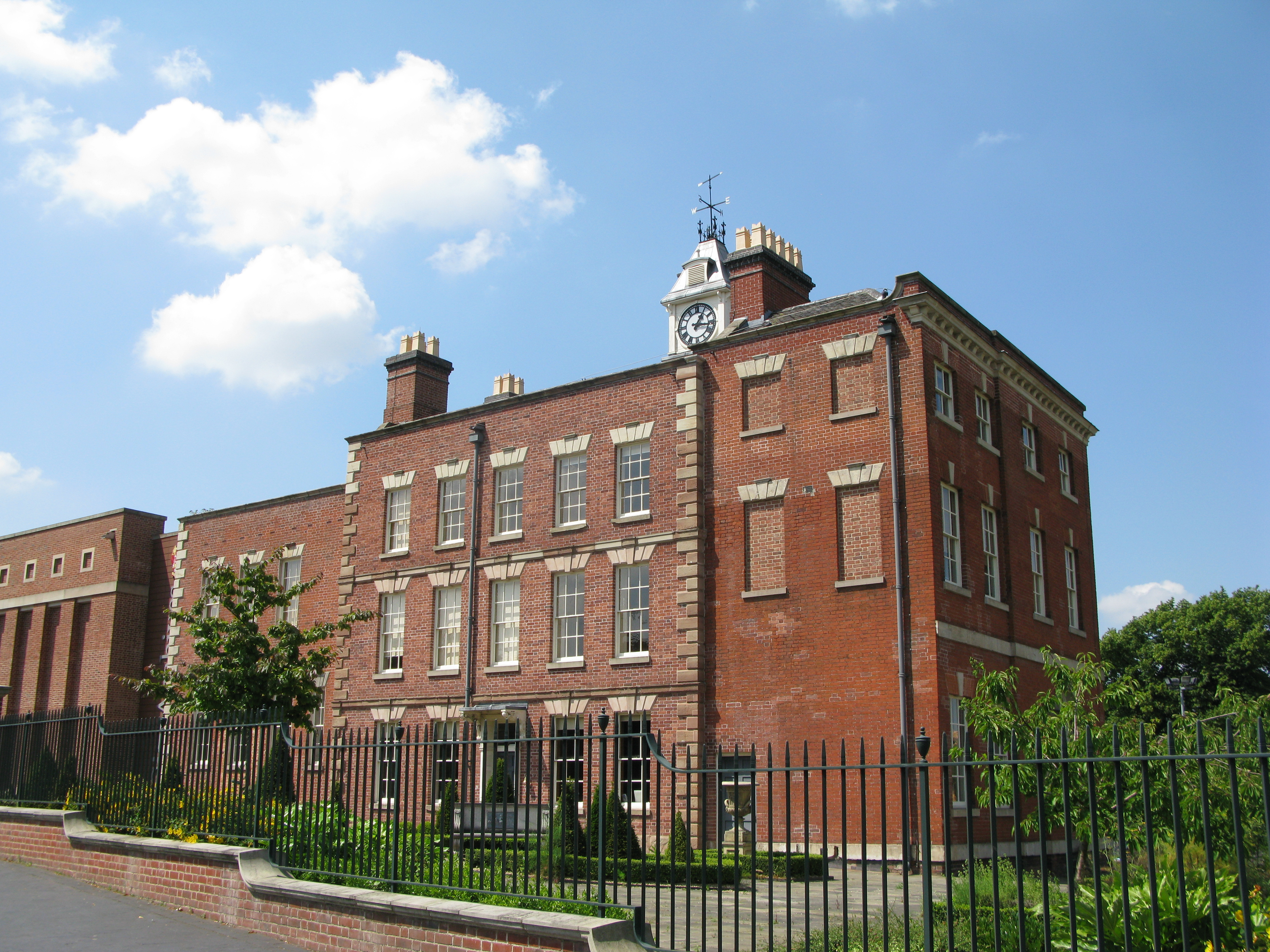
Wolverhampton City Archives, 2014

Wolverhampton City Archives service is located in the centre of the City of Wolverhampton, England. It is part of the Arts and Heritage Division of the Adult and Community Services Directorate of Wolverhampton City Council.

The Archives are based in the former Molineux Hotel building, built in the mid eighteenth century and restored since 2003 thanks to a Heritage Lottery fund grant. The Archives office collects, preserves and makes accessible records relating to the history of Wolverhampton and its residents.

== Records available ==
Wolverhampton City Archives holds over 30,0000 photographs; records of local churches, schools and other institutions; records of the City Council and its predecessors; and records of local industries, clubs and societies. Details of the records held here, along with those of other archives and museums in the area, can be searched on the Black Country History website.
