= Molineux Hotel =

Hotel in Wolverhampton, West Midlands, England

Coordinates: 52.5887°N 2.1304°W

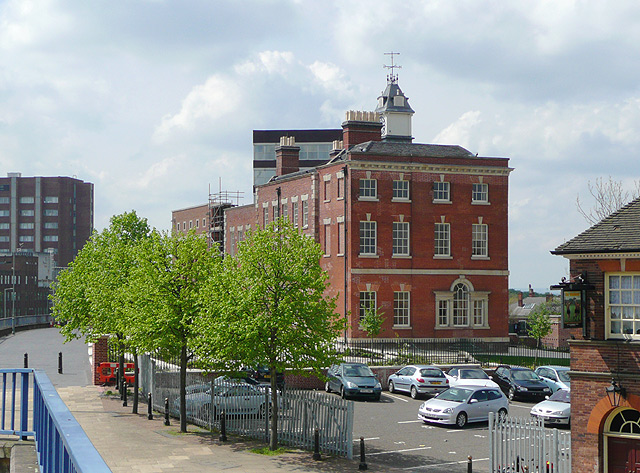
The hotel in 2009, following its restoration

The Molineux Hotel in Wolverhampton is an 18th-century former mansion house known as Molineux House, which later served as a hotel and currently, following restoration serves as a local authority facility. It is a Grade II* listed building.

John Molyneux (born 1685), a great-grandson of Sir John Molyneux of Teversal Manor, near Mansfield, Nottinghamshire (see Molyneux Baronets) settled in Wolverhampton in about 1700. His son Benjamin Molyneux (later known as Molineux), a wealthy ironfounder and banker, built a new three storeyed five bayed mansion on the then outskirts of the town in about 1720. George Molineux, who resided at Molineux House, was High Sheriff of Staffordshire in 1793. An additional Georgian style south wing was added towards the end of the 18th century, possibly by George Molineux, and there were further alterations and extensions including a belfry turret in the 19th century.

The Molineux family sold the property in about 1860 and the new owner created a public pleasure park on the grounds. In about 1870 the old house was converted for use as a hotel. In 1889 the pleasure grounds were closed and the park was leased out to Wolverhampton Wanderers FC. The hotel was closed down in 1979 and for many years the building stood empty and neglected. Various plans for redevelopment of the site failed and in 2003 the building was gutted by fire.

In 2005, with the support of a grant from English Heritage, major restoration began to convert the property into a facility to house the City of Wolverhampton Archives. It finally opened to users on 10 March 2009; the service had previously operated from part of the building on Snow Hill previously occupied by Rackhams department store.
