= John McHugh (tenor) =

British opera singer (1911–2004)

John McHugh (23 July 1911 – June 2004) was a British tenor best known for his singing of ballads and songs.

McHugh was born Wolverhampton, the son of John McHugh and his wife Mary (née Flatley).

Encouraged to sing by Wolverhampton teacher May Summerfield and a priest named Grimaldi at Wolverhampton's Roman Catholic church of St Mary and St John, McHugh began performing in church choirs and other venues around Wolverhampton. His big break came on 21 November 1936, when he sang in London's Gaumont Theatre for a regional competition of the BBC Amateur Hour. He won the competition at both the regional and the national levels.

Lady Dorothy Peploe (1893-1976) became McHugh's benefactor but withdrew her support when McHugh married. The marriage produced two children, Roger and Christopher. Although widely travelled, McHugh lived his entire life in Wolverhampton except for a brief residence in Chalkwell before moving back into Wolverhampton, where he died and is buried.

His friend Muriel Emms wrote a biography of McHugh which was given to him on his 88th birthday in 1999. It remains unpublished and is deposited together with much other material about McHugh's life at Wolverhampton Archives.
