= John McCormack (tenor) =

Irish tenor (1884–1945)

Count John McCormack KSG, KSS, KHS
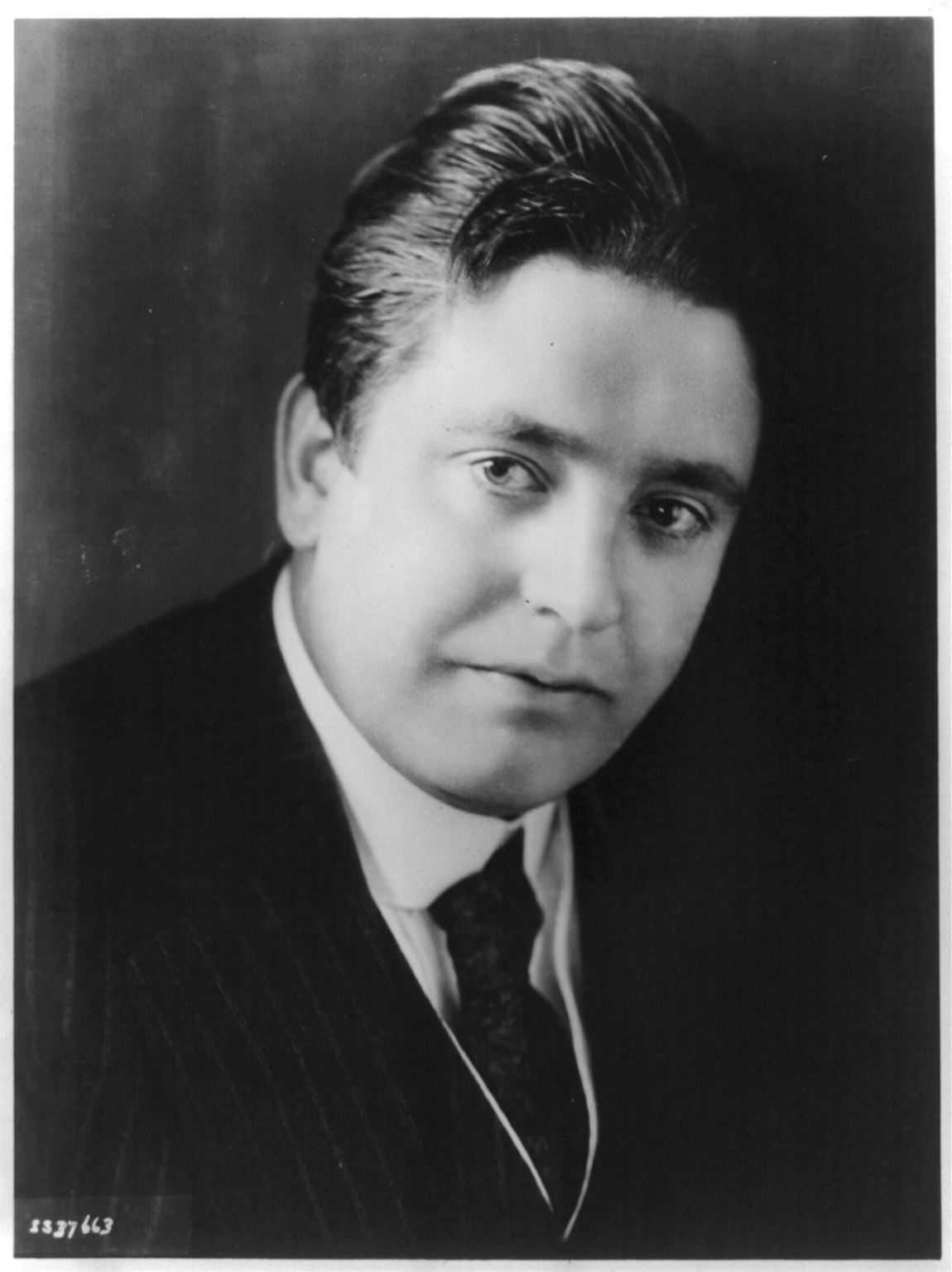
- Born: John Francis McCormack; 14 June 1884; Athlone, County Westmeath, Ireland
- Died: 16 September 1945 (aged 61); Booterstown, Dublin, Ireland
- Citizenship: United Kingdom of Great Britain and Ireland (from 1884); United States (from 1917)
- Occupations: Singer; songwriter
- Spouse: Lily Foley (m. 1906)
- Children: 2

Count John Francis McCormack (14 June 1884 – 16 September 1945), was an Irish lyric tenor celebrated for his performances of the operatic and popular song repertoires, and renowned for his diction and breath control. He was also a Papal Count. (Note: Note: he was often named in Ireland by official sources as John Count McCormack, including as such at his grave stone.) McCormack became a naturalised American citizen before returning to live in Ireland.

== Early life ==
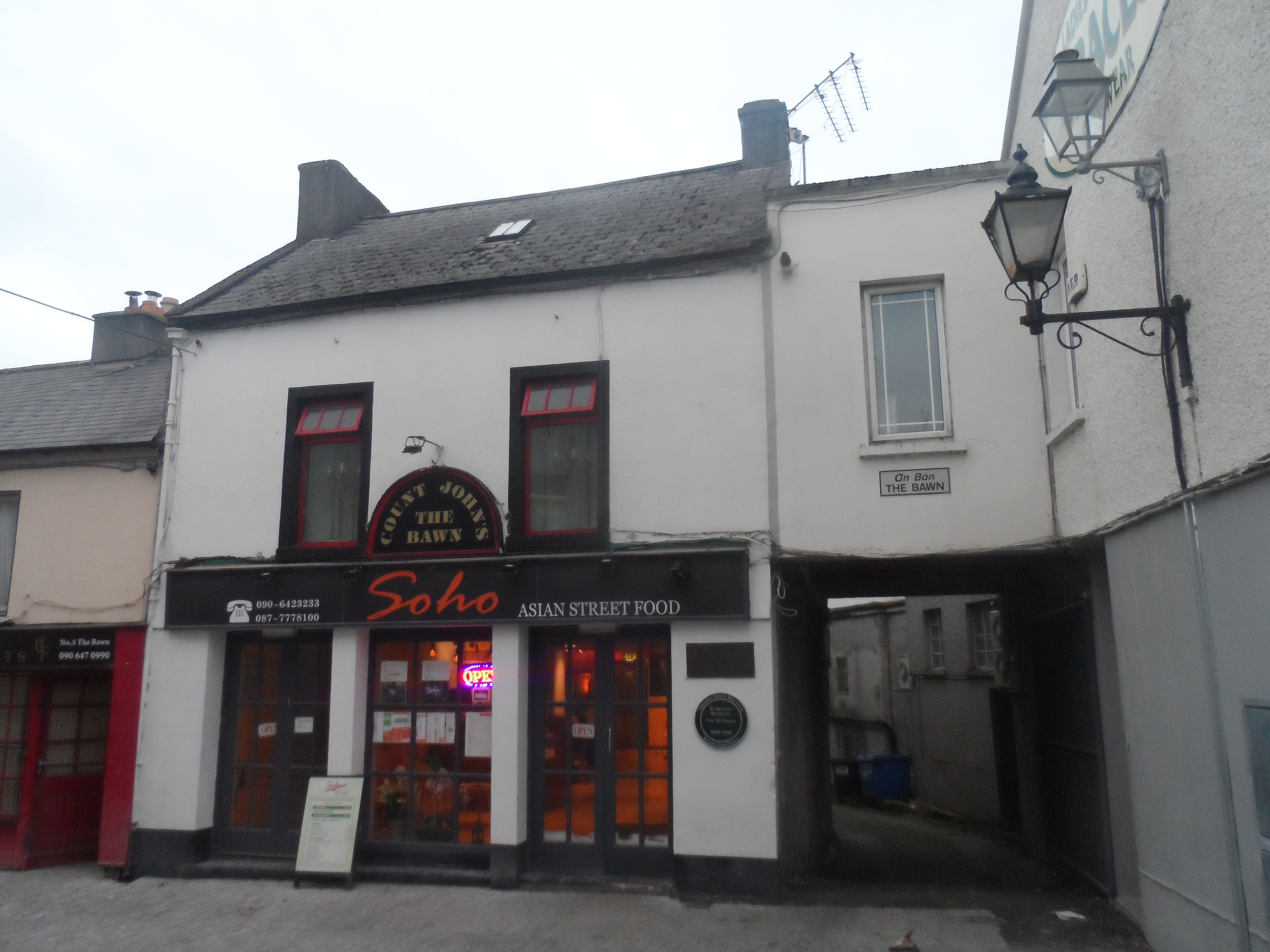
McCormack's birthplace, The Bawn, Athlone.

John Francis McCormack was born on 14 June 1884 in Athlone, County Westmeath, Ireland, the second son and fifth of the 11 children (five of whom died in infancy or childhood) of Andrew McCormack and his wife Hannah Watson. His parents were both from Galashiels, Scotland and worked at the Athlone Woollen Mills, where his father was a foreman. He was baptised in St. Mary's Church, Athlone on 23 June 1884.

McCormack received his early education from the Marist Brothers in Athlone and later attended Summerhill College, Sligo. He sang in the choir of the old St Peter's church in Athlone under his choirmaster, Michael Kilkelly. When the family moved to Dublin, he sang in the choir of St Mary's Pro-Cathedral where he was discovered by Vincent O'Brien. In 1903, he won the coveted gold medal of the Dublin Feis Ceoil.

In March 1904, McCormack became associated with James Joyce, who at the time had singing ambitions himself. Richard Ellmann, in his biography of Joyce, states that "Joyce spent several evenings with him" (i.e. McCormack), practising; along with Joyce's acquaintance Richard Best; McCormack persuaded Joyce to enter the Feis Ceoil that year, where the not yet famous writer was awarded the Bronze Medal (3rd prize).

== Career ==
The grave of John McCormack in Dean's Grange Cemetery

Fundraising activities on his behalf enabled McCormack to travel to Italy in 1905 to receive voice training by Vincenzo Sabatini (father of the novelist Rafael Sabatini) in Milan. Sabatini found McCormack's voice naturally tuned and concentrated on perfecting his breath control, an element that would become part of the basis of his renown as a vocalist.

In 1906, he made his operatic début at the Teatro Chiabrera, Savona. The next year, he began his first important operatic performance at Covent Garden in Mascagni's Cavalleria rusticana, becoming the theatre's youngest principal tenor. In 1909, he began his career in America. Michael Scott ("The Record of Singing" 1978) writes that at this stage of his career, he should be considered a tenor of the Italian style—and he sang (and recorded) French operatic arias in the Italian language. Steane ("The Grand Tradition" 1971) stresses that, for all his later devotion to the concert platform (and his Irish identity), he was (for albeit a relatively brief period), in essence an Italian operatic tenor.

In February 1911, McCormack played Lieutenant Paul Merrill in the world premiere of Victor Herbert's opera Natoma with Mary Garden in the title role. Later that year, he toured Australia after Dame Nellie Melba engaged him, then at the height of his operatic career, aged 27, as a star tenor for the Melba Grand Opera Season. He returned for concert tours in subsequent years.

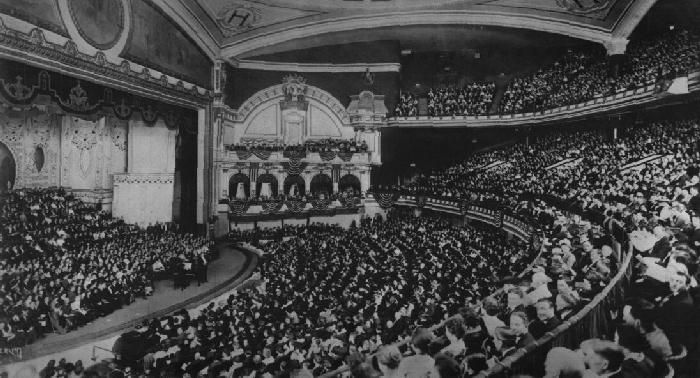
McCormack in the 5000-seat New York Hippodrome c.1915–1916

Keep The Home Fires Burning

By 1912, he was becoming increasingly involved with concert performances, where his voice quality and charisma ensured that he became the most celebrated lyric tenor of his time. He did not, however, retire from the operatic stage until after his performance of 1923 in Monte Carlo (see biography below), although by then the top notes of his voice had contracted. Famous for his extraordinary breath control, he could sing 64 notes on one breath in Mozart's "Il mio tesoro" from Don Giovanni, and his Handelian singing was just as impressive in this regard.

McCormack made hundreds of recordings, his best-known and most commercially successful series of records being those for the Victor Talking Machine Company during the 1910s and 1920s. He was Victor's most popular Red Seal recording artist after tenor Enrico Caruso. In the 1920s, he sang regularly on radio and later appeared in two sound films, Song o' My Heart, released in 1930, playing an Irish tenor, and as himself appearing in a party scene in Wings of the Morning (1937), the first British three-strip Technicolor feature.

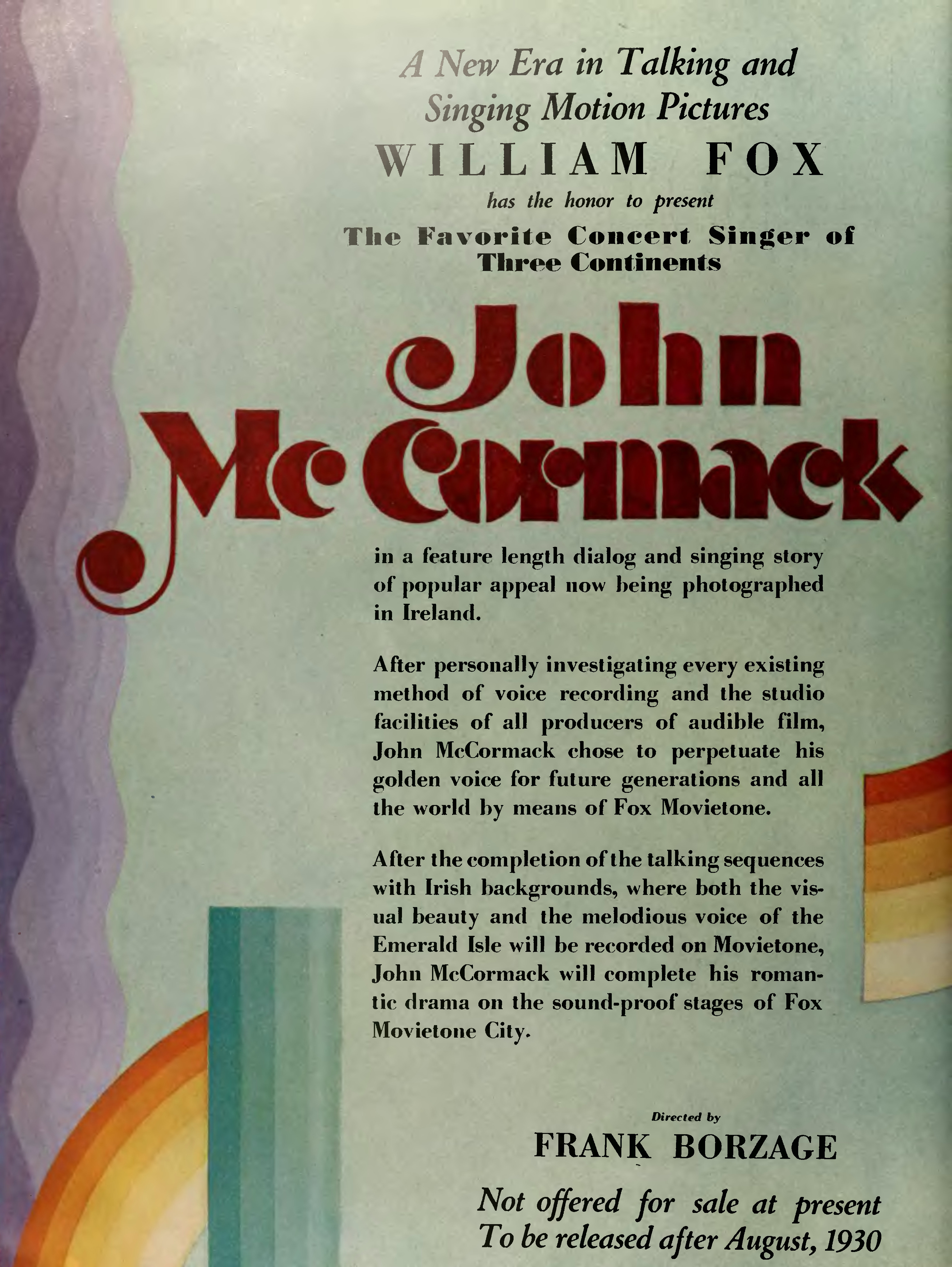
John McCormack ad (part 1) in The Film Daily (1929). This film was shot in Ireland, but was still in production.

McCormack was one of the first artists to record the popular ballad "I Hear You Calling Me", written in 1908 by Harold Harford and Charles Marshall; he recorded it twice for Odeon starting in 1908 and a further four times for Victor between 1910 and 1927 – it became his best seller. He was the first artist to record the famous World War I song "It's a Long Way to Tipperary" in 1914; He also recorded a best-selling version of another popular World War I tune "Keep The Home Fires Burning" in 1917. He also sang songs expressive of Irish nationalism — his recording of "The Wearing of the Green", a song about the Irish rebellion of 1798, encouraged 20th-century efforts for Irish Home Rule — and endorsed the Irish Nationalist estrangement from the United Kingdom. McCormack was associated particularly with the songs of Thomas Moore, notably "The Harp That Once Through Tara's Halls", "The Minstrel Boy", "Believe Me If All (Those Endearing Young Charms)", and "The Last Rose of Summer". Between 1914 and 1922, he recorded almost two dozen songs with violin accompaniment provided by Fritz Kreisler, with whom he also toured. He recorded songs of Hugo Wolf for the Hugo Wolf Society in German. In 1918, he recorded the song "Calling Me Home to You".

In 1917, McCormack became a naturalised citizen of the United States. In June 1918, he donated $11,458 ($215,296 in 2022) towards the USA's World War I effort. By then, his career was a huge financial success, earning millions in his lifetime from record sales and appearances.

By 1920, Edwin Schneider had become McCormack's accompanist, and the two were "inseparable". When Schneider retired, Gerald Moore took over as accompanist from 1939 to 1943.

In 1927, McCormack moved into Moore Abbey, Monasterevin, County Kildare, and adopted a very opulent lifestyle by Irish standards. He also owned apartments in London and New York. He hoped that one of his racehorses, such as Golden Lullaby, would win The Derby, but they never did.

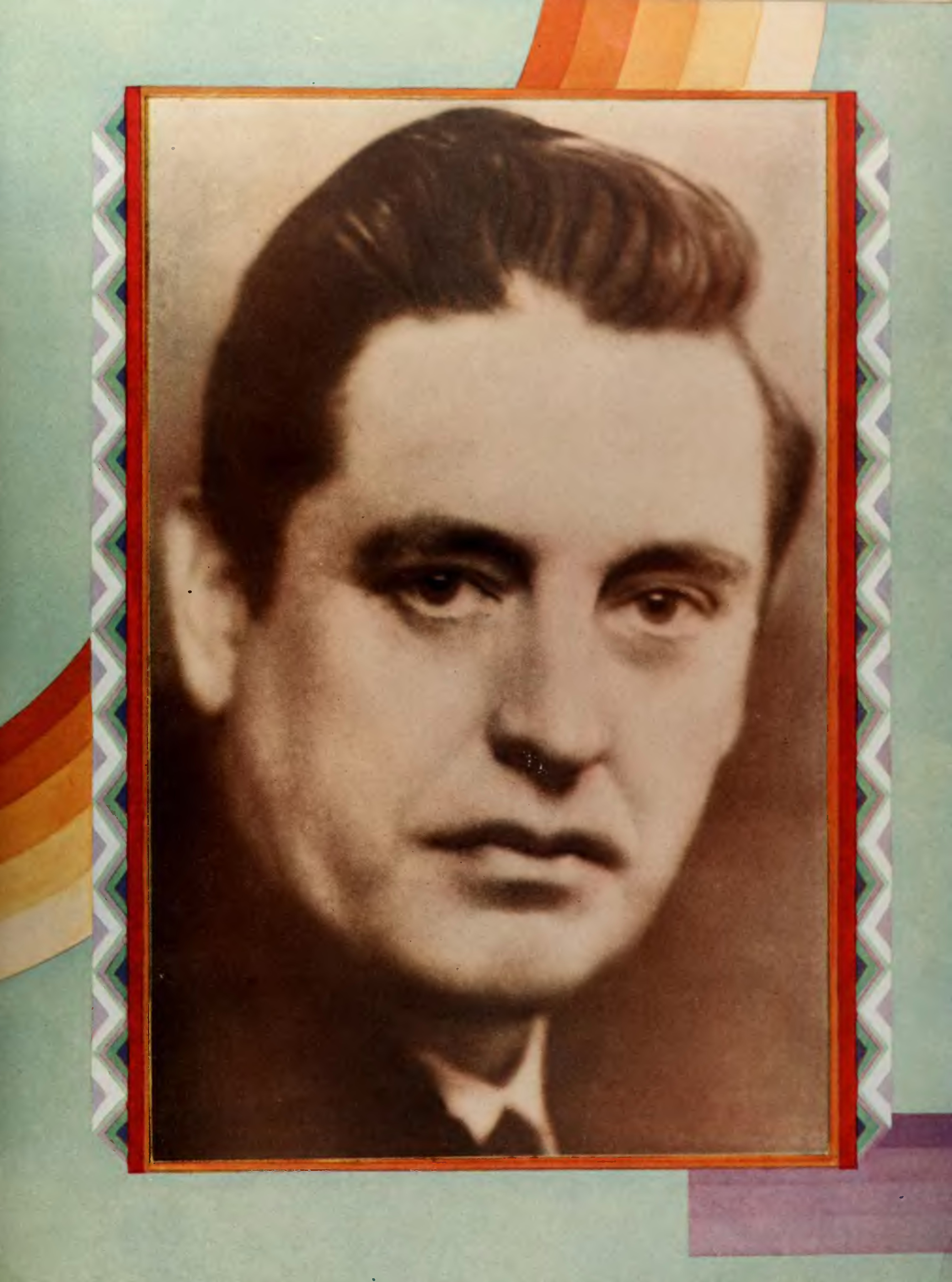
John McCormack ad (part 2) in The Film Daily, 1929

McCormack also bought Runyon Canyon in Hollywood in 1930 from Carman Runyon. McCormack saw and liked the estate while there filming Song o' My Heart (1930), an early all-talking, all-singing picture. McCormack used his salary for this movie to purchase the estate and built a mansion he called "San Patrizio", after Saint Patrick. McCormack and his wife lived in the mansion until they returned to England in 1938.

McCormack toured often, and in his absence, the mansion was often let to celebrities such as Janet Gaynor and Charles Boyer. The McCormacks made many friends in Hollywood, among them Errol Flynn, Will Rogers, John Barrymore, Basil Rathbone, Ronald Colman, Charles E. Toberman and the Dohenys. After his farewell tour of America in 1937, the McCormacks deeded the estate back to Carman Runyon, expecting to return to the estate at a later date. World War II intervened and McCormack did not return.

McCormack originally ended his career at the Royal Albert Hall in London, during 1938. However, a year after that farewell concert, he was back singing for the Red Cross and in support of the war effort. He gave concerts, toured, broadcast and recorded in this capacity until 1943 when poor health finally forced him to retire permanently. (Note: One of his last recordings was his 1941 "Mighty Lak' a Rose" rendition of the song by Frank Lebby Stanton (lyrics) and Ethelbert Nevin (music). For the recording, click here on YouTube)

== Personal life and death ==
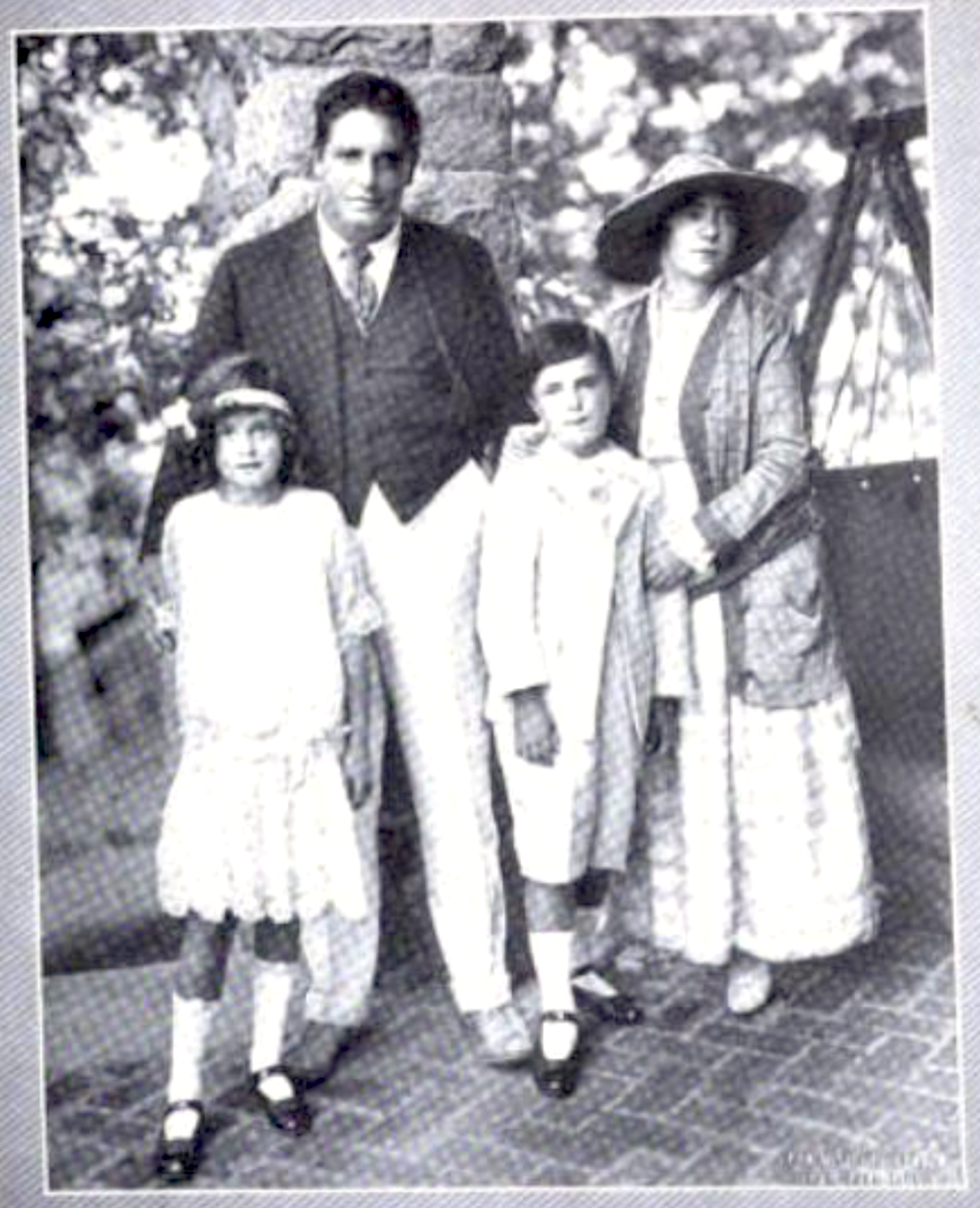
John McCormack with his wife Lily and their children, Gwen and Cyril

McCormack married Lily Foley in 1906; they had two children, Cyril and Gwen.

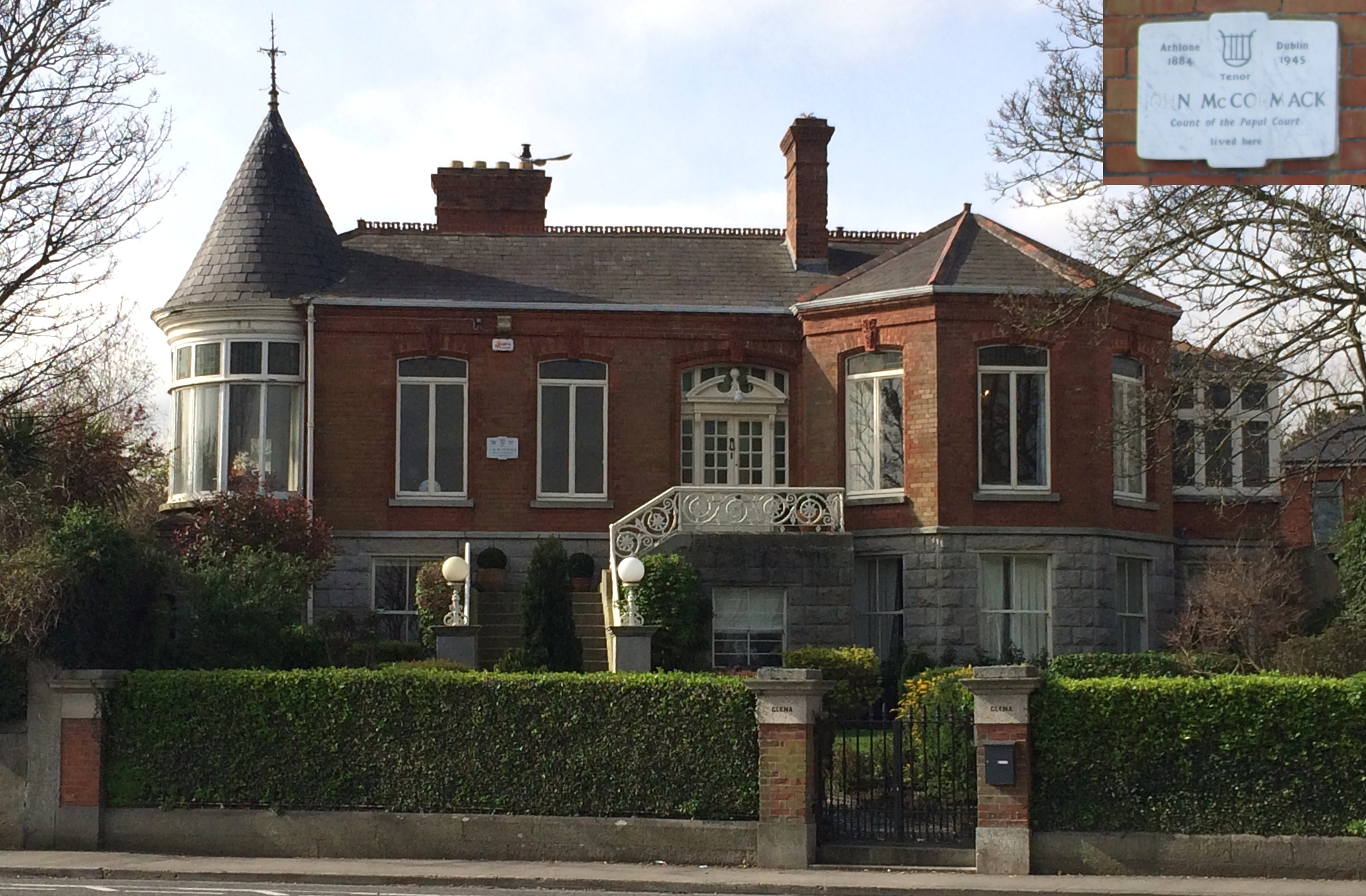
Glena, Booterstown

Ill with emphysema, he bought a house near the sea, "Glena", Booterstown, Dublin. (Note: He also bought and owned a property in County Wicklow known as the Old Conna, which later became a private hotel, a private property and subsequently Aravon School and Golf Course.) After years of increasingly poor health and a series of infectious illnesses, including influenza and pneumonia, McCormack died at his home in Booterstown on 16 September 1945. He is buried in Deansgrange Cemetery, St. Patrick's section, plot reference E/120.

== Honours ==
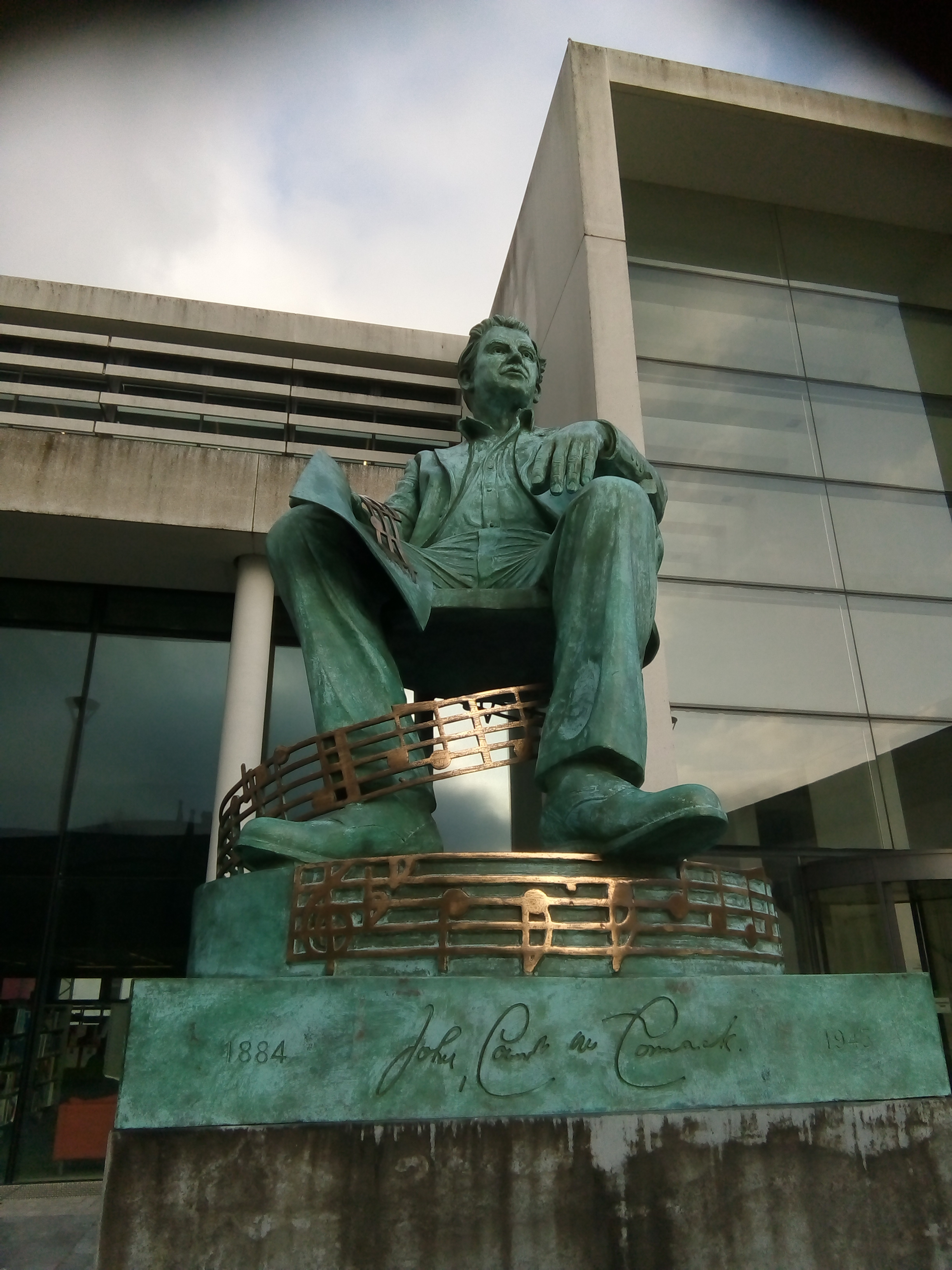
Statue of McCormack outside Athlone Town Hall

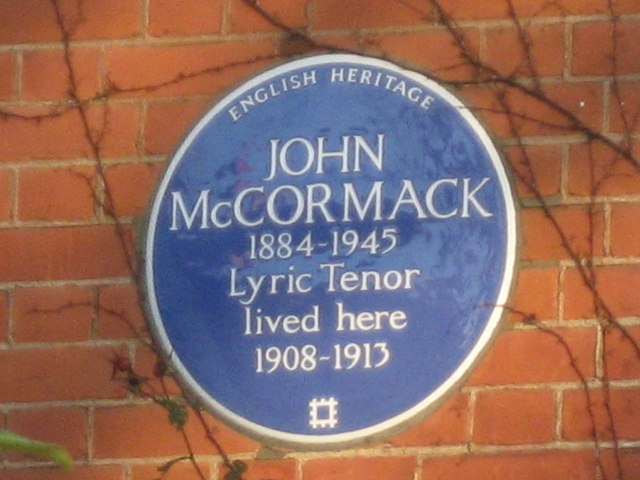
John McCormack blue plaque in London

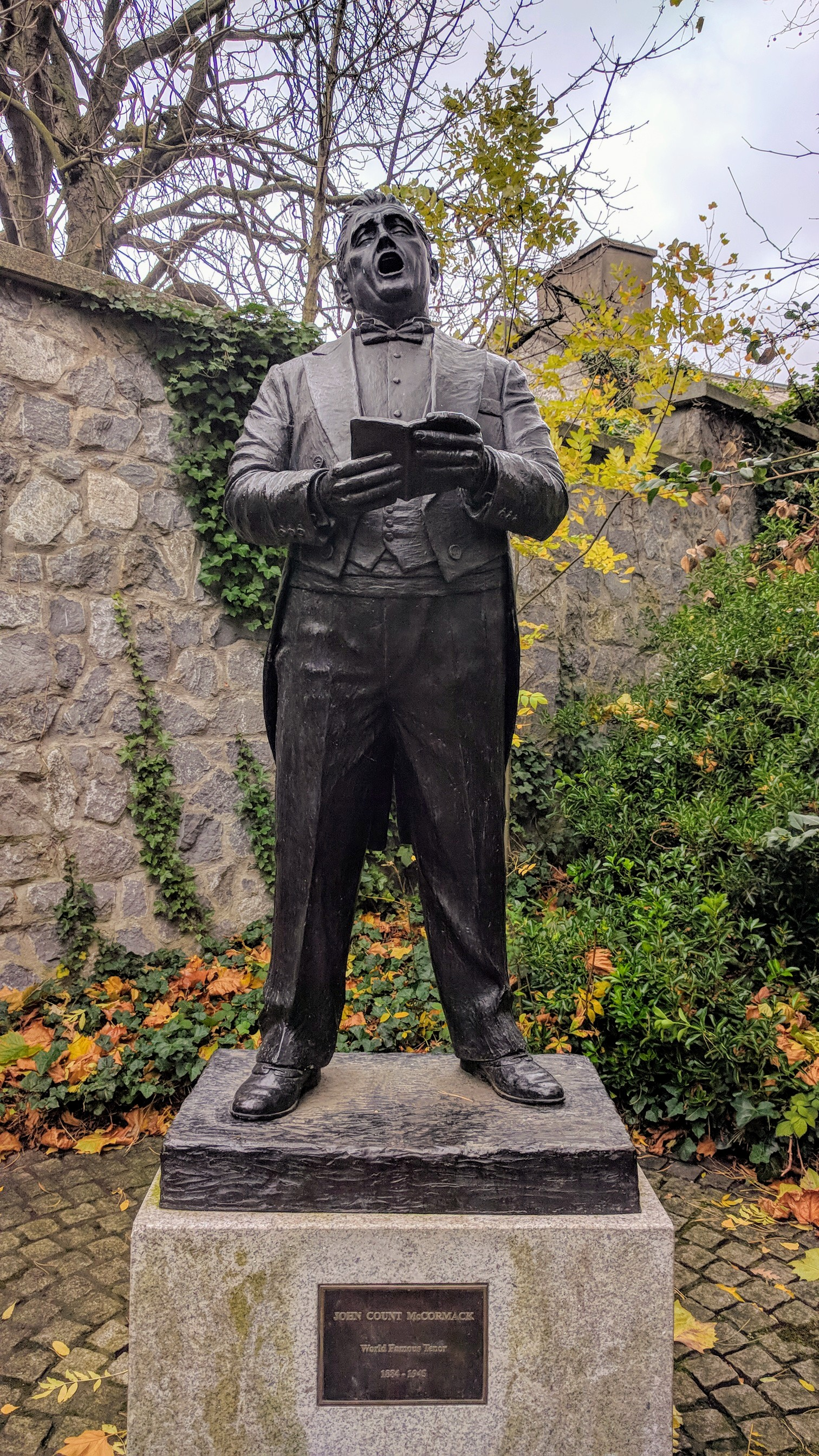
John McCormack statue in Iveagh Gardens, Dublin

McCormack was much honoured and decorated for his musical career. In 1928, he received the title of Papal Count from Pope Pius XI in recognition of his work for Catholic charities. He had earlier received three papal knighthoods, Knight of the Order of the Holy Sepulchre (KHS), Knight of the Order of St. Gregory the Great (KSG) and Knight of the Order of St. Sylvester (KSS). He was also a Knight of Malta and a Privy Chamberlain of the Sword and Cape, an honour which is known now as a Gentlemen of His Holiness.

One of the most famous performances of McCormack's Irish career was his singing of César Franck's Panis angelicus to the hundreds of thousands who thronged Dublin's Phoenix Park for the 1932 Eucharistic Congress.

A life-sized bronze statue of McCormack by sculptor Elizabeth O'Kane was established in Dublin on 19 June 2008. The statue stands in the Iveagh Gardens, close to the National Concert Hall.

In his hometown of Athlone, he is commemorated by the Athlone Institute of Technology, which named its performance hall after him, the John McCormack Hall.

He is also commemorated by an English Heritage blue plaque on the house near Hampstead in London, 24 Ferncroft Avenue, where he lived from 1908 until 1913.

A silver €10 collectors coin with a mintage of 8,000 pieces was issued by the Central Bank of Ireland in January 2014, featuring a portrait of McCormack; the coin was issued as part of the EUROPA star series in keeping with the 2014 theme of European musicians.

A statue of the tenor was unveiled in a square newly named in his honour outside the Civic Centre in Athlone on 24 October 2014. The sculpture, created by the Irish artist Rory Beslin, was celebrated by free admission to an exhibition of the celebrated singer's memorabilia.

In 1984, a street in Washington, D.C., was named in his honour. The street is near the Basilica of the National Shrine of the Immaculate Conception and commemorates McCormack's role in supporting its construction by singing a benefit recital in 1928.

== See also ==
- List of people on stamps of Ireland
