= Edwin Schneider =

American pianist (1874-1958)

Edwin Schneider (May 20, 1874 - April 12, 1958) was an American pianist, teacher, and music editor. He is best known as the partner and accompanist of Irish tenor John McCormack. Before meeting McCormack, he was an editor and translator for the John Church Company.

== Musical education ==
Schneider enrolled at the Leipzig Conservatory on September 26 1902. He had previously studied the piano with Harrison Weld, Christian Balatka and Glenn Dillard Gunn. He had also received lessons in harmony from Hans Balatka and singing from Frederick W. Carbury before starting his studies in Leipzig.

At the Conservatory he was taught by Gustav Schreck in music theory, Gustav Ewald in singing and Friedrich Werder in Italian. His main subject was piano playing, which he studied under Robert Teichmüller.

Schneider graduated during Easter time 1903 with great references from his teachers.

== Songs ==
- When the Dew is Falling
- Your Eyes
