= Music of Ireland =

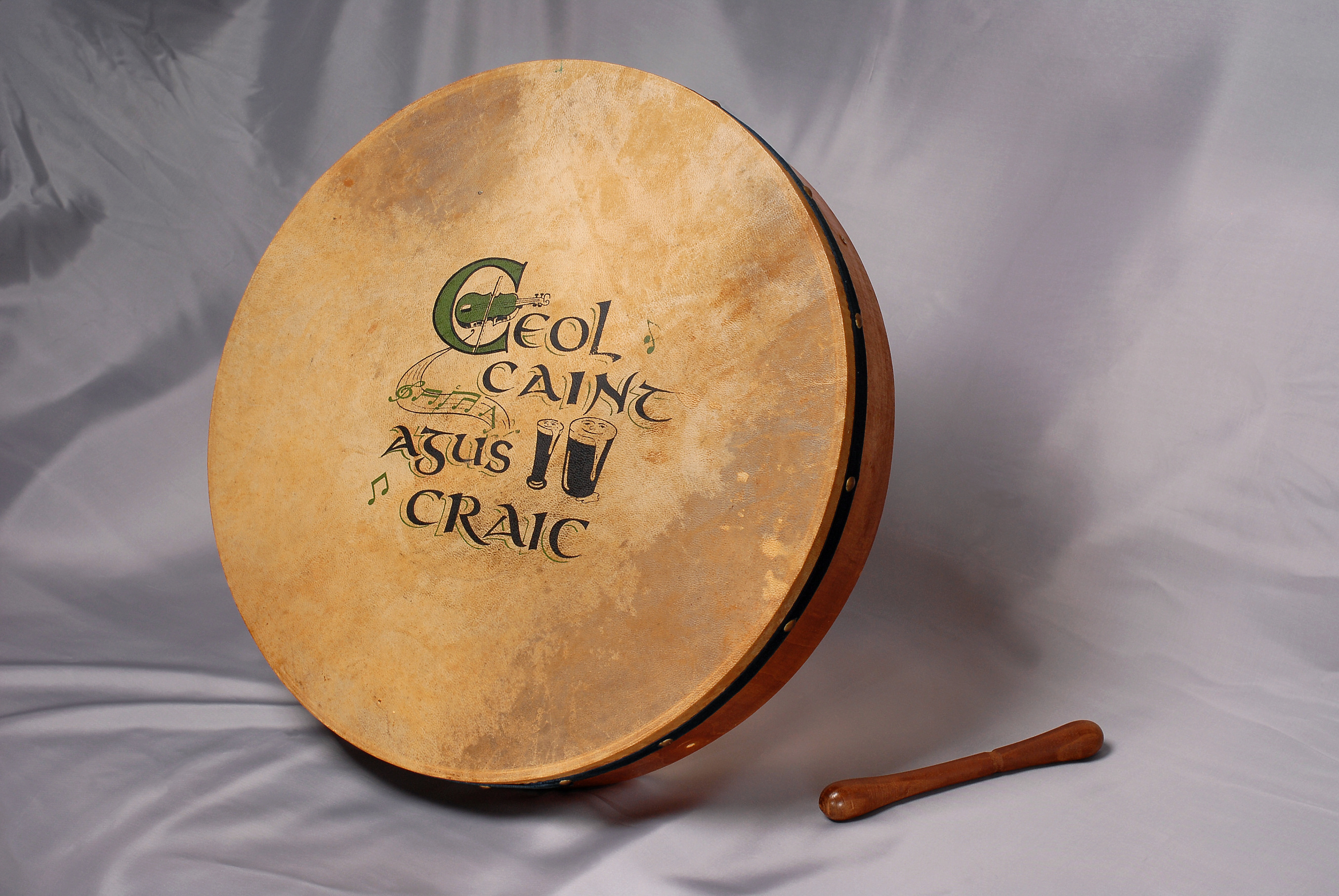
The bodhrán, a traditional Irish drum

Irish music is music that has been created in various genres on the island of Ireland.

The indigenous music of the island is termed Irish traditional music (or Irish folk music). It has remained vibrant through the 20th and into the 21st century, despite globalising cultural forces. In spite of emigration and mass exposure to music from Britain and the United States, Ireland's traditional music has kept many of its elements and has itself influenced other forms of music, such as country and roots music in the United States, which in turn have had some influence on modern rock music. Irish folk music has occasionally been fused with punk rock, electronic rock and other genres. Some of these fusion artists have attained mainstream success, at home and abroad.

In art music, Ireland has a history reaching back to Gregorian chants in the Middle Ages, choral and harp music of the Renaissance, court music of the Baroque and early Classical period, as well as many Romantic, late Romantic and twentieth-century modernist music. It is still a vibrant genre with many composers and ensembles writing and performing avant-garde art music in the classical tradition.

On a smaller scale, Ireland has also produced many jazz musicians of note, particularly after the 1950s.

== Early Irish music ==
A 16th century Irish Warpipe player

By the High and Late Medieval Era, the Irish annals were listing native musicians, such as the following:

- 921BC: Cú Congalta, priest of Lann-Leire, the Tethra (i. e. the singer or orator) for voice, personal form and knowledge, died.
- 1011: Connmhach Ua Tomhrair, priest and chief singer of Cluain-mic-Nois, died.
- 1168: Amhlaeibh Mac Innaighneorach, chief ollamh of Ireland in harp-playing, died.
- 1226: Aed mac Donn Ó Sochlachain, erenagh of Cong, a man eminent for chanting and for the right tuning of harps and for having made an instrument for himself which none had made before, distinguished also in every art such as poetry, engraving and writing and in every skilled occupation, sadly died.
- 1269: Aed Ó Finn, master of music and minstrelsy, died.
- 1329: Maol Ruanaidh Cam Ó Cearbhaill, tiompanist, murdered during the Braganstown Massacre in County Louth.
- 1330: Mael Sechlainn Mac Carmaic, a general entertainer, died.
- 1343: Donnchad Clereach Ó Maol Braonáin, a choral canon of Elphin, was killed by an arrow.
- 1357: Donn Shléibhe Mac Cerbaill, an accomplished musician ... died.
- 1360: Gilla na Naem Ó Conmaigh, music ollamh of Thomond ... died.
- 1361. Magraith Ó Fionnachta, Chief Musician and Tiompanist to the Síol Muireadaigh, died.
- 1364: Bran Ó Brain, a skilful tympanist ... died.
- 1369: John Mac Egan, and Gilbert Ó Bardan, two accomplished young harpers of Conmaicne, died.
- 1469: Ruaidrí mac Donnchad Ó Dálaigh, the most musical-handed harpist in all Ireland.
- 1490: Diarmait MacCairbre, harper, was executed.
- 1553: Tadhg, son of Ruaidhri Ó Comhdhain, i.e. the ollamh of Éire and Alba in music, died.
- 1561: Naisse mac Cithruadh, drowned on Lough Gill.
- 1589. Daighre Ó Duibhgeannáin, a most affable, musical man, died.

=== Modern interpretation ===
Early Irish poetry and song has been translated into modern Irish and English by notable Irish poets, song collectors and musicians. The 6th century hymn Rop tú mo baile by Dallán Forgaill for example, was published in 1905 in English by Mary Elizabeth Byrne, and is widely known as Be Thou My Vision. The Blackbird of Belfast Lough (Old Irish: Int én bec; Irish: An t-éan beag) has been notably translated by poets such as Seamus Heaney, Ciaran Carson and Frank O'Connor. Notable recordings of modern interpretations of early Irish music include Pádraigín Ní Uallacháin's Songs of the Scribe, various music albums by choral group Anúna, and the recordings of Caitríona O'Leary with Dúlra and the eX Ensemble.

== Early Irish musicians abroad ==
Some musicians were acclaimed in places beyond Ireland. Cú Chuimne (died 747) lived much of his adult life in Gaelic Scotland, and composed at least one hymn. Foillan, who was alive in the seventh century, travelled through much of Britain and France; around 653 at the request of Saint Gertrude of Brabant, taught psalmody to her nuns at Nievelle. Tuotilo (c.850–c. 915), who lived in Italy and Germany, was noted both as a musician and a composer.

Helias of Cologne (died 1040), is held to be the first to introduce Roman chant to Cologne. His contemporary, Aaron Scotus (died 18 November 1052) was an acclaimed composer of Gregorian chant in Germany.

Donell Dubh Ó Cathail (c. 1560s-c.1660), was not only musician of Viscount Buttevant, but, with his uncle Donell Óge Ó Cathail, harper to Elizabeth I.

== Early modern times ==
Give Me Your Hand
Instrumental featuring viola da gamba and recorder, performed by Dancing Willow

Up to the seventeenth century, harp musicians were patronised by the aristocracy in Ireland. This tradition died out in the eighteenth century with the collapse of Gaelic Ireland. Turlough Carolan (1670–1738) is the best known of those harpists, and over 200 of his compositions are known. Some of his pieces use elements of contemporary baroque music, but his music has entered the tradition and is played by many folk musicians today. Edward Bunting collected some of the last-known Irish harp tunes at the Belfast Harp Festival in 1792. Other important collectors of Irish music include Francis O'Neill and George Petrie.

Other notable Irish musicians of this era included Cearbhall Óg Ó Dálaigh (fl. c. 1630); Piaras Feiritéar (1600?–1653); William Connellan (fl. mid-17th century) and his brother, Thomas Connellan (c. 1640/1645–1698), composers; Dominic Ó Mongain (alive 18th century); Donnchadh Ó Hámsaigh (1695–1807); poet and songwriter Eoghan Rua Ó Súilleabháin (1748–1782); Arthur O'Neill (fl. 1792); Patrick Byrne (c.1794–1863); world-renowned piper Tarlach Mac Suibhne (c. 1831–1916); poet and songwriter Colm de Bhailís (1796–1906).

== Traditional music ==
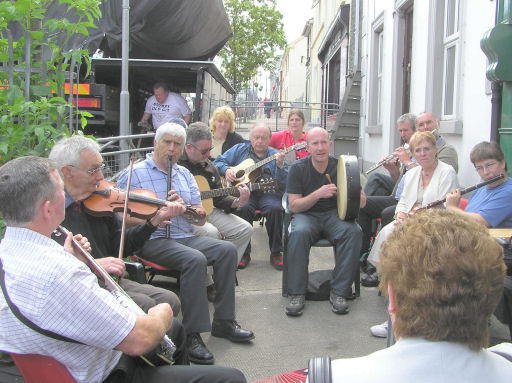
A traditional music session, known in some circles in Irish as a seisiún, a word invented in the 1990s

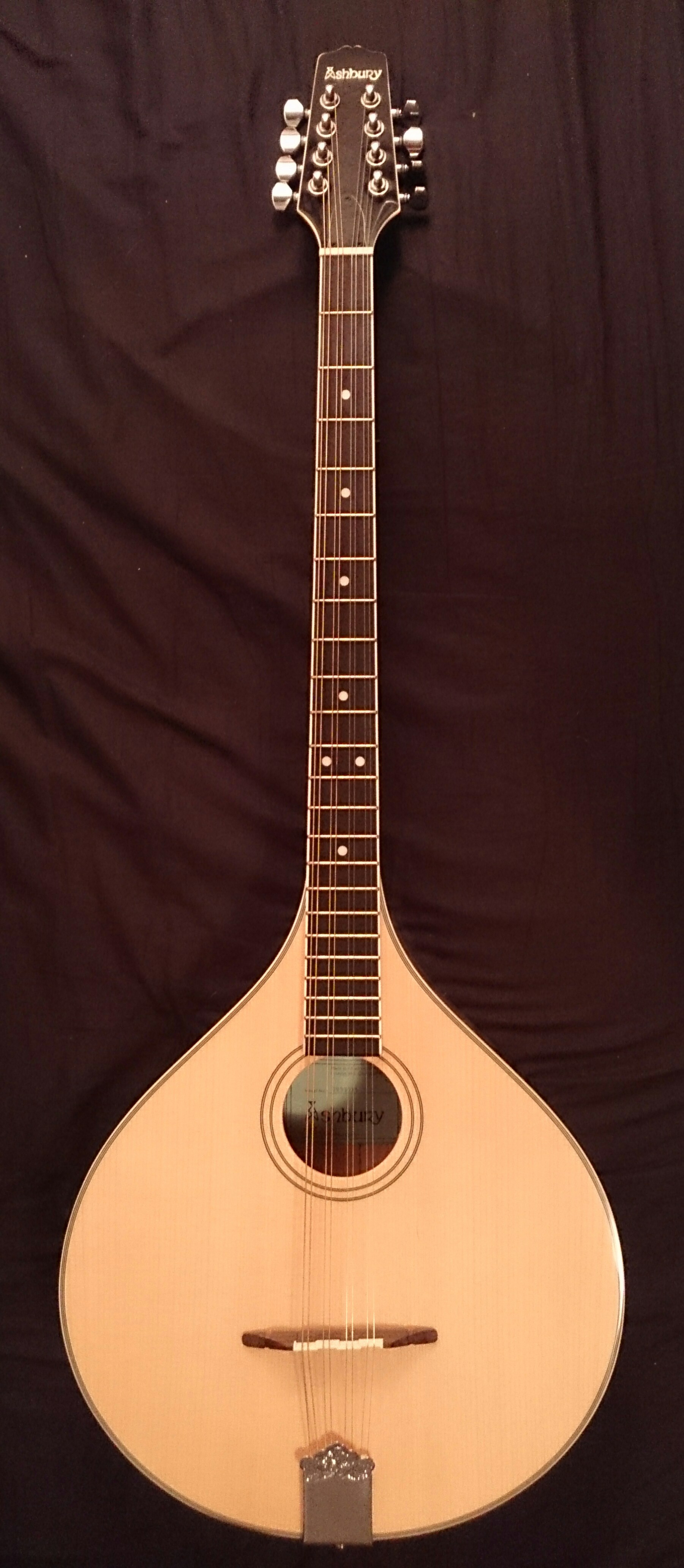
An Irish bouzouki

Irish traditional music includes many kinds of songs, including drinking songs, ballads and laments, sung unaccompanied or with accompaniment by a variety of instruments. Traditional dance music includes reels (4/4), hornpipes and jigs (the common double jig is in 6/8 time). The polka arrived at the start of the nineteenth century, spread by itinerant dancing masters and mercenary soldiers, returning from Europe. Set dancing may have arrived in the eighteenth century. Later imported dance-signatures include the mazurka and the highlands (a sort of Irished version of the Scottish strathspey).

The Irish fiddle was said by one nationalist researcher to have been played in Ireland since the 8th century, although this has never been proved by texts or artifacts. Great Irish warpipes were once commonly used in Ireland, especially in battle, as far back as the 15th century. Bagpipes have also long been associated with Ireland.

A revival of Irish traditional music took place around the turn of the 20th century. The button accordion and the concertina were becoming common. Irish stepdance was performed at céilís, organised competitions and at some country houses where local and itinerant musicians were welcome. Irish dancing was supported by the educational system and patriotic organisations. An older style of singing called sean-nós ("in the old style"), which is a form of traditional Irish singing was still found, mainly for very poetic songs in the Irish language.

From 1820 to 1920 over 4,400,000 Irish people emigrated to the US, creating an Irish diaspora in Philadelphia, Chicago (see Francis O'Neill), Boston, New York and other cities. O'Neill made the first recordings of Irish music on Edison wax cylinders. Emigrated Irish musicians who found success in the United States made commercial recordings, which found their way around the world and re-invigorated musical styles in Ireland. For example, American-based fiddlers like Michael Coleman, James Morrison and Paddy Killoran did much to popularise Irish music in the 1920s and 1930s, while Ed Reavy composed over a hundred tunes that have since entered the tradition in both Ireland and the diaspora.

Brian Boru's March with traditional flute performed by the U.S. Marine Band

After a lull in the 1940s and 1950s, when traditional music was at a low ebb (except for Céilidh bands), Seán Ó Riada's Ceoltóirí Chualann, The Chieftains, Tom Lenihan, The Clancy Brothers and Tommy Makem, The Irish Rovers, The Dubliners, Ryan's Fancy and Sweeney's Men were in large part responsible for a second wave of revitalisation of Irish folk music in the 1960s. Several of these were featured in the 2010 TV movie "My Music: When Irish Eyes are Smiling". Seán Ó Riada in particular was singled out as a force who did much for Irish music, through programming on Radio Éireann in the late 1940s through the 1960s. He worked to promote and encourage the performing of traditional Irish music, and his work as a promoter and performer led directly to the formation of the Chieftains. His work inspired the likes of Planxty, The Bothy Band and Clannad in the 70s. Later came such bands as Stockton's Wing, De Dannan, Altan, Arcady, Dervish and Patrick Street, along with a wealth of individual performers.

Irish music is becoming more popular, with new bands such as Téada, Gráda, Dervish, and Lúnasa continuing to emerge.

== Classical music in Ireland ==
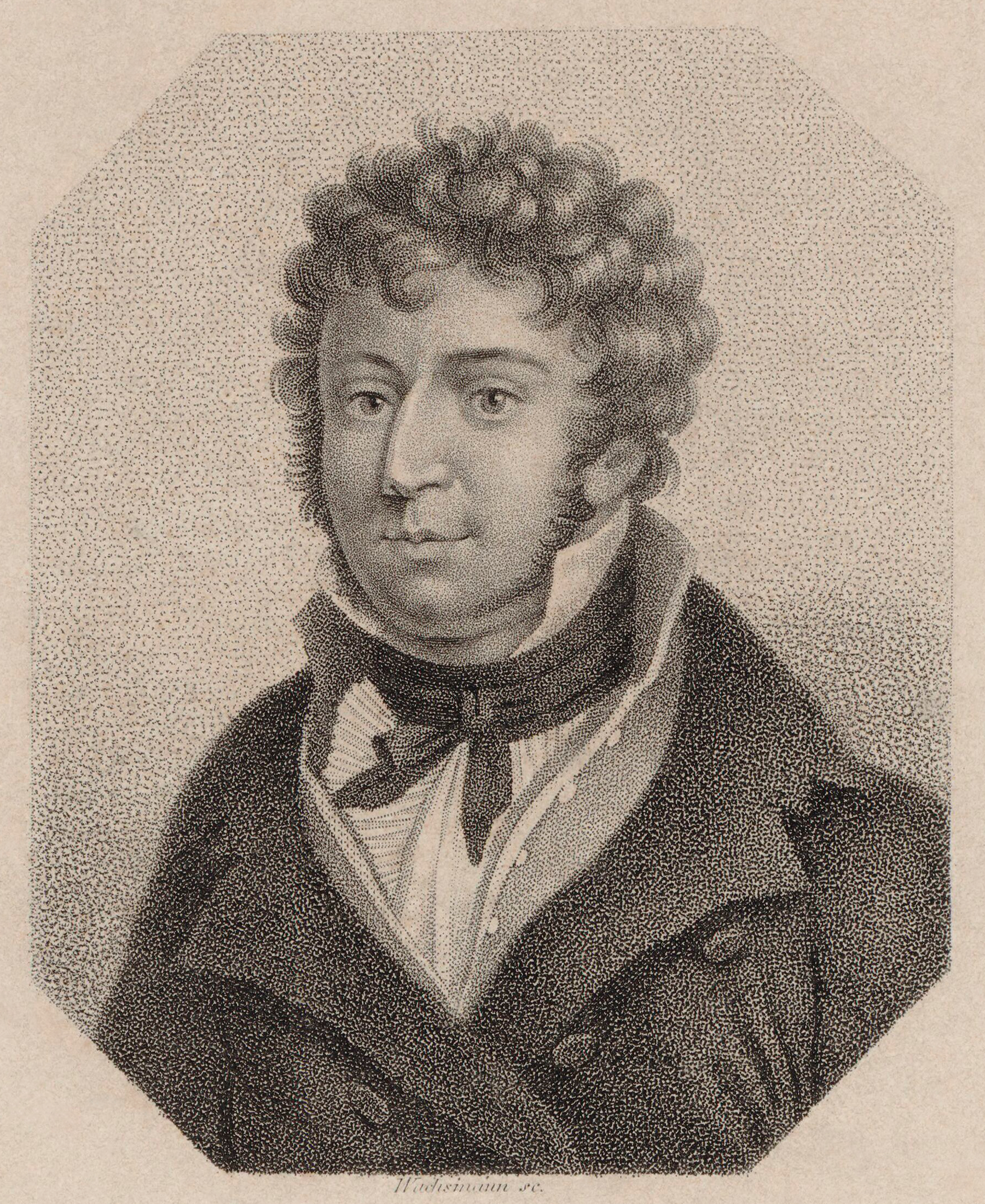
John Field, one of Ireland's foremost classical composers

There is evidence of music in the "classical" tradition since the early 15th century when a polyphonic choir was established at Christ Church Cathedral, Dublin, and "city musicians" were employed in the major cities and towns, who performed on festive occasions. In the 18th century, Dublin was known as the "Second City" of the British Isles, with an active musical life culminating in, among other events, the first performance of Handel's famous oratorio Messiah. The ballad opera trend, caused by the success of the Beggar's Opera, has left noticeable traces in Ireland, with many works that influenced the genre in England and on the continent, by musicians such as Charles Coffey and Kane O'Hara.

=== Composers of note ===
Apart from the harper-composers of the 16th century, composers in the 16th and 17th century usually came from a Protestant Anglo-Irish background, as due to the discrimination of Catholics no formal musical education was available to them. Composers were often associated with either Dublin Castle or one of the Dublin cathedrals (St Patrick's and Christ Church). These include immigrants in the 18th century such as Johann Sigismund Cousser, Matthew Dubourg, and Tommaso Giordani. Thomas Roseingrave and his brother Ralph were prominent Irish baroque composers. Among the next generation of composers were the Cork-born Philip Cogan (1750–1833), a prominent composer of piano music including concertos, John Andrew Stevenson (1761–1833), who is best known for his publications of Irish Melodies with poet Thomas Moore, who also wrote operas, religious music, catches, glees, odes, and songs. In the early 19th century Irish-born composers dominated English-language opera in England and Ireland, including Charles Thomas Carter (c.1735–1804), Michael Kelly (1762–1826), Thomas Simpson Cooke (1782–1848), William Henry Kearns (1794–1846), Joseph Augustine Wade (1801–1845) and, later in the century, Michael W. Balfe (1808–1870) and William Vincent Wallace (1812–1865). John Field (1782–1837) has been credited with the creation of the Nocturne form, which influenced Frédéric Chopin. John William Glover (1815–1899), Joseph Robinson (1815–1898) and Robert Prescott Stewart (1825–1894) kept Irish classical music in Dublin alive in the 19th century, while mid-19th-century emigrants include George William Torrance and George Alexander Osborne. Charles Villiers Stanford (1852–1924) and Hamilton Harty (1879–1941) were among the last emigrants in Irish music, combining a late romantic musical language with Irish folklorism. Their contemporary in Ireland was the Italian immigrant Michele Esposito (1855–1929), a figure of seminal importance in Irish music who arrived in Ireland in 1882. The years after Irish independence were a difficult period in which composers tried to find an identifiable Irish voice in an anti-British climate, which included ressentiments against classical music as such. The development of Irish broadcasting in the 1920s and the gradual enlargement of the Radio Éireann Orchestra in the late 1930s improved the situation. Important composers in these years were John F. Larchet (1884–1967), Ina Boyle (1889–1967), Arthur Duff (1899–1956), Aloys Fleischmann (1910–1992), Frederick May (1911–1985), Joan Trimble (1915–2000), and Brian Boydell (1917–2000). The middle decades of the 20th century were also shaped by A.J. Potter (1918–1980), Gerard Victory (1921–1995), James Wilson (1922–2005), Seán Ó Riada (1931–1971), John Kinsella (1932–2021), and Seóirse Bodley (1933–2023). Prominent names among the older generation of composers in Ireland today are Frank Corcoran (b. 1944), Eric Sweeney (1948–2020), John Buckley (b. 1951), Gerald Barry (b. 1952), Raymond Deane (b. 1953), Gearóid Ó Deaghaidh (b. 1954), Patrick Cassidy (b. 1956), and Fergus Johnston (b. 1959) (see also List of Irish classical composers).

=== Performers of note ===
Performers of note in classical music include Catherine Hayes (1818–1861), Ireland's first great international prima donna and the first Irish woman to perform at La Scala in Milan; tenor Barton McGuckin (1852–1913), a much-demanded singer in the late 19th century; tenor Joseph O'Mara (1864–1927), a very prominent singer around the turn of the century; tenor John McCormack (1884–1945), the most celebrated tenor of his day; opera singer Margaret Burke-Sheridan (1889–1958); pianist Charles Lynch (1906–1984); tenor Josef Locke (1917–1999) achieved global success and was the subject of the 1991 film Hear My Song; the concert flautist Sir James Galway and pianist Barry Douglas. Douglas achieved fame in 1986 by claiming the International Tchaikovsky Competition gold medal. Mezzo-sopranos Bernadette Greevy and Ann Murray have also had success internationally.

=== Choral music ===
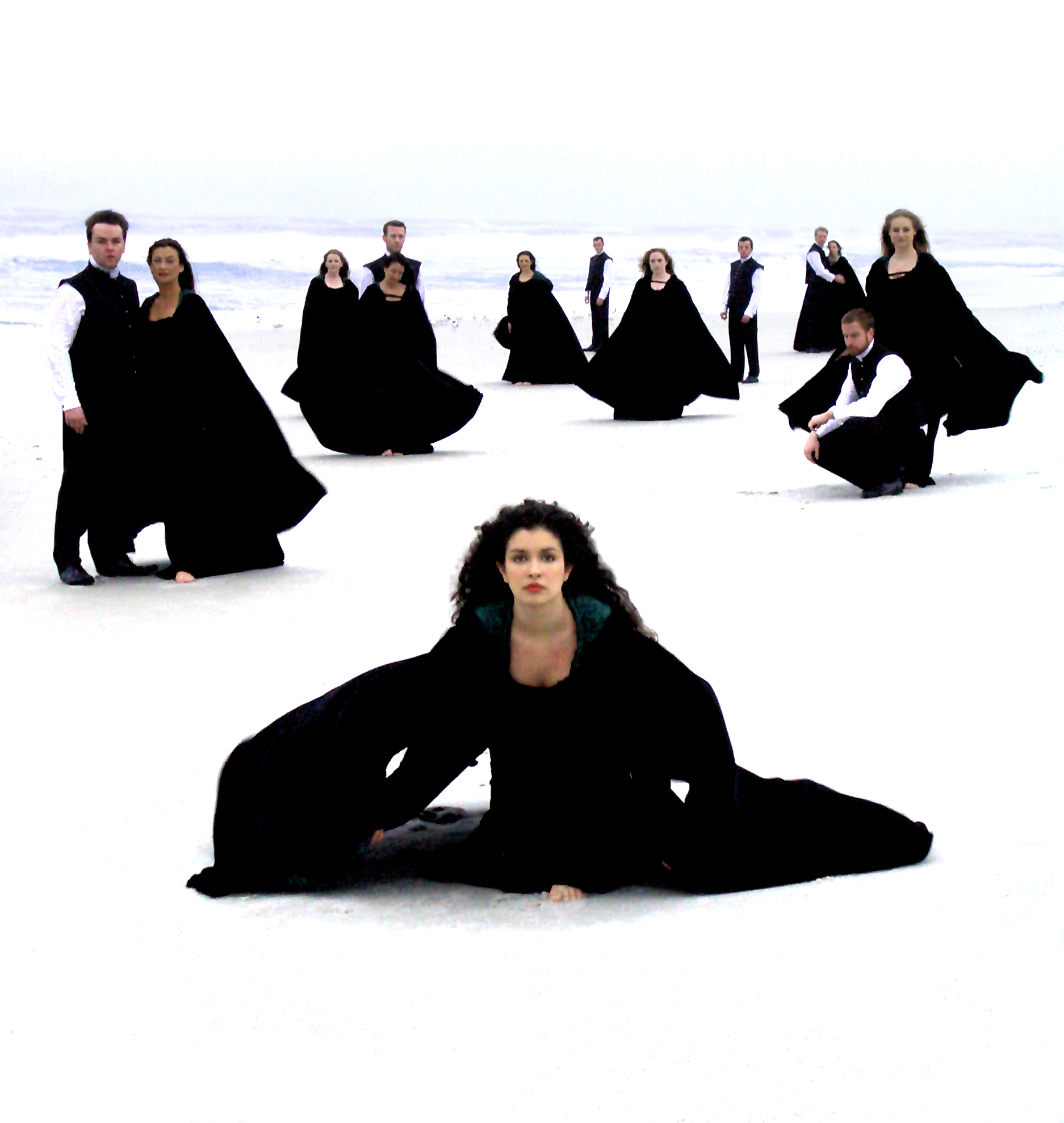
Anúna

Choral music has been practised in Ireland for centuries, initially at the larger churches such as Christ Church Cathedral, St Patrick's Cathedral, and St Mary's Cathedral, as well as the University of Dublin Choral Society (founded in 1837).

Founded and directed by composer Michael McGlynn in 1987, Anúna contributed significantly to raising the profile of choral music, particularly through their contributions to Riverdance which they were a part of from 1994 to 1996. They were nominated for a Classical Brit Award in the UK and appeared at the BBC Proms series in the Royal Albert Hall in 1999. In 2012 they featured as the voices of Hell in the video game Diablo III. In February 2018 the group won the Outstanding Ensemble category of the Annual Game Music Awards 2017 for their contributions to the video game Xenoblade Chronicles 2.

The Chamber Choir Ireland, formerly National Chamber Choir of Ireland, is principally funded by the Arts Council of Ireland. Their artistic director is Paul Hillier. The choir has produced a number of CDs with international (including Irish) repertoire. There are many semi-professional choirs in Ireland at local level, too. Many perform and compete at the annual Cork International Choral Festival (since 1954).

=== Opera ===
Although Ireland had no purpose-built opera house for a long time, opera has been performed in Ireland since the 17th century. In the 18th century, Ireland was a centre for ballad opera and created important works that helped to develop the genre in the direction of operetta, with works by Charles Coffey and Kane O'Hara. Nationally identifiable Irish operas have been written by immigrants such as Tommaso Giordani and Johann Bernhard Logier as well as by native composers such as John Andrew Stevenson and Thomas Simpson Cooke, continued in the 19th century with works by John William Glover and Paul McSwiney. Michael William Balfe and Vincent Wallace were the most prominent representatives of mid-19th-century English-language operas.

The Celtic Renaissance after 1900 created works such as Muirgheis (1903) by Thomas O'Brien Butler, Connla of the Golden Hair (1903) by William Harvey Pélissier, Eithne (1909) by Robert O'Dwyer, and The Tinker and the Fairy (1910) by Michele Esposito. Muirgheis and Eithne have librettos in Irish, as have a number of works by Geoffrey Molyneux Palmer and several 1940s and '50s works by Éamonn Ó Gallchobhair. Most of the Irish operas written since the 1960s have a contemporary international outlook, with important works by Gerard Victory, James Wilson, Raymond Deane, Gerald Barry, and a number of young composers since the turn of the century.

There have been subsequent attempts to revive the Irish-language tradition in opera. A brother-sister team previewed sections of the opera Clann Tuireann publicly. In 2024 musician and composer John Spillane premiered his bilingual opera Fíoruisce - The Legend of the Lough.

Wexford Festival Opera is a major international festival that takes place every October and November.

== Popular music ==
=== Early popular performers ===
Performers of popular music began appearing as early as the late 1940s; Delia Murphy popularised Irish folk songs that she recorded for His Master's Voice in 1949; Margaret Barry is also credited with bringing traditional songs to the fore; Donegal's Bridie Gallagher shot to fame in 1956 and is considered 'Ireland's first international pop star'; Belfast-born singer Ruby Murray achieved unprecedented chart success in the UK in the mid-1950s; Dublin native Carmel Quinn emigrated to the US and became a regular singer on Arthur Godfrey's Talent Scouts and appeared frequently on other TV variety shows in the 1950s and '60s. The Bachelors were an all-male harmony group from Dublin who had hits in the UK, Europe, US, Australia and Russia; Mary O'Hara was a soprano and harpist who was successful on both sides of the Atlantic in the 1950s and early 1960s; Waterford crooner Val Doonican had a string of UK hits and presented his own TV show on the BBC from 1965 to 1986.

=== Showbands in Ireland ===
Irish Showbands were a major force in Irish popular music, particularly in rural areas, for twenty years from the mid-1950s. The showband played in dance halls and was loosely based on the six or seven piece Dixieland dance band. The basic showband repertoire included standard dance numbers, cover versions of pop music hits, ranging from rock and roll, country and western to jazz standards. Key to the showband's success was the ability to learn and perform songs currently in the record charts. They sometimes played Irish traditional or Céilidh music and a few included self-composed songs.

=== Country and Irish ===
With the rise in popularity of American country music, a new subgenre developed in Ireland known as 'Country and Irish'. It was formed by mixing American Country music with Irish influences, incorporating Irish folk music. This often resulted in traditional Irish songs being sung in a country music style. It is especially popular in the rural Midlands and North-West of the country. It also remains popular among Irish emigrants in Great Britain. Big Tom and The Mainliners were the first major contenders in this genre, having crossed over from the showband era of the 1960s. Other major artists were Philomena Begley and Margo, the latter even being bestowed the unofficial title of Queen of Country & Irish. The most successful performer in the genre today is Daniel O'Donnell, who has garnered success in the UK, US and Australia. O'Donnell's frequent singing partner Mary Duff has also had success in this genre and most recently County Carlow native Derek Ryan has enjoyed Irish chart hits doing this type of music.

=== Fusion ===
Traditional music played a part in Irish popular music later in the century, with Clannad, Van Morrison, Hothouse Flowers and Sinéad O'Connor using traditional elements in popular songs. Enya achieved international success with New Age/Celtic fusions. The Afro-Celt Sound System achieved fame adding West African influences and electronic dance rhythms in the 1990s while bands such as Kíla fuse traditional Irish with rock and world music representing the Irish tradition at world music festivals across Europe and America. The most notable fusion band in Ireland was Horslips, who combined Irish themes and music with heavy rock. The Shamrock Wings is a Colombian band that fuses Irish music with Caribbean rhythms.

Riverdance is a musical and dancing interval act which originally starred Michael Flatley and Jean Butler and featuring the choir Anúna. It was performed during the Eurovision Song Contest 1994 as "Riverdance". Popular reaction to the act was so immense that an entire musical revue was built around the act.

=== Pop/Rock ===
The 1960s saw the emergence of major Irish rock bands and artists, such as Them, Van Morrison, Emmet Spiceland, Eire Apparent, Skid Row, Taste, Rory Gallagher, Dr. Strangely Strange, Thin Lizzy, Gary Moore, Mellow Candle.

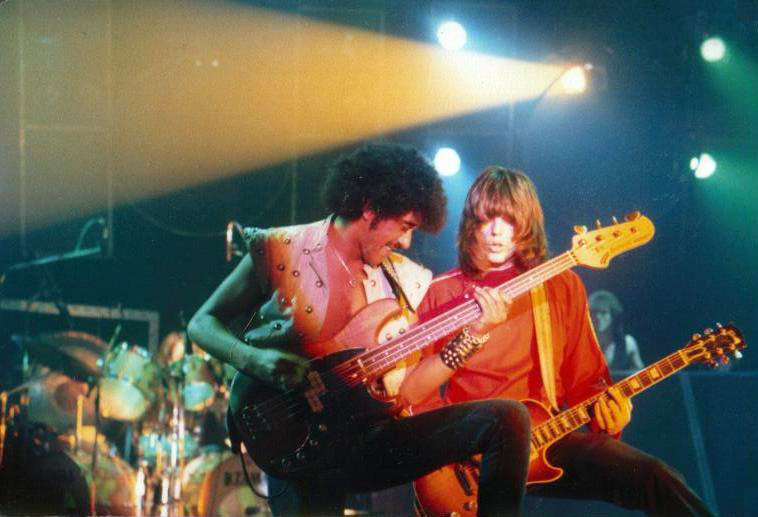
Thin Lizzy in concert, 1981

In 1970 Dana put Ireland on the pop music map by winning the Eurovision Song Contest with her song All Kinds of Everything. She went to number one in the UK and all over Europe and paved the way for many Irish artists. Gilbert O'Sullivan went to the top of the charts on both sides of the Atlantic in 1972 with a string of hits, and the all-sister line-up of The Nolans gained international chart success in the late 1970s. Chris de Burgh achieved international acclaim with his 1986 hit "Lady in Red".

Some groups who formed during the emergence of punk rock in the mid-late 1970s included U2, Virgin Prunes, The Boomtown Rats, The Undertones, Aslan, Gavin Friday, and Stiff Little Fingers. Later in the 80s and into the 90s, Irish punk fractured into new styles of alternative rock, which included That Petrol Emotion, In Tua Nua, Fatima Mansions, My Bloody Valentine and Ash. In the 1990s, pop and rock bands like The Corrs, B*Witched, Boyzone, Westlife and The Cranberries emerged. In the same decade, Ireland also contributed a subgenre of folk metal known as Celtic metal with exponents of the genre including Cruachan, Primordial, Geasa, and Waylander.

In recent decades Irish music in many different genres has been very successful internationally; however, the most successful genres have been rock, popular and traditional fusion, with performers such as (in alphabetical order): Altan, The Answer, Ash, Aslan, Aphex Twin, B*Witched, Bell X1, Frances Black, Mary Black, The Blizzards, The Bothy Band, Brendan Bowyer, Boyzone, Paul Brady, Jimmy Buckley, Chris de Burgh, Paddy Casey, The Cast of Cheers, Celtic Thunder, Celtic Woman, The Chieftains, The Clancy Brothers, Clannad, Codes, Rita Connolly, The Coronas, The Corrs, Phil Coulter, Nadine Coyle (of Girls Aloud), The Cranberries, Peter Cunnah (of D:Ream), Dana, De Dannan, Cathy Davey, Damien Dempsey, The Divine Comedy, Joe Dolan, Val Doonican, Ronnie Drew, The Dubliners, Mary Duff, Duke Special, EDEN, Enya, Julie Feeney, Fight Like Apes, Fontaines D.C., Mick Flannery, The Frames, The Fureys, Bridie Gallagher, Rory Gallagher, Lisa Hannigan, Glen Hansard of The Frames, Keith Harkin, Gemma Hayes, The High Kings, Niall Horan (of One Direction), Horslips, The Hothouse Flowers, Hozier, In Tua Nua, Andy Irvine, Laura Izibor, Gavin James, Jape, Jerry Fish & The Mudbug Club, Siva Kaneswaran (of The Wanted), Dolores Keane, Sean Keane, Luke Kelly, Dermot Kennedy, Keywest, Kíla, James Kilbane, Kodaline, Jack L, Johnny Logan, Dónal Lunny, Phil Lynott and Thin Lizzy, Tommy Makem, Imelda May, Eleanor McEvoy, Christy Moore, Gary Moore, Van Morrison, Moving Hearts, Samantha Mumba, Mundy, Róisín Murphy, Ruby Murray, My Bloody Valentine, Declan Nerney, Maura O'Connell, Sinéad O'Connor, Daniel O'Donnell, Annmarie O'Riordan, Declan O'Rourke, Gilbert O'Sullivan, Picturehouse, Picture This, Pillow Queens, Planxty, Carmel Quinn, Republic of Loose, Damien Rice, The Riptide Movement, Dickie Rock, Derek Ryan, The Saw Doctors, The Script, Sharon Shannon, Pa Sheehy (of Walking on Cars), Snow Patrol, Something Happens, Davy Spillane, Stiff Little Fingers, Stockton's Wing, The Strypes, Tebi Rex, Therapy?, The Thrills, The Undertones, Walking on Cars, The Wolfe Tones, Two Door Cinema Club, U2, VerseChorusVerse, Villagers, Westlife, Bill Whelan, Finbar Wright, all achieving success nationally and internationally.

== Best selling Irish acts of all time ==
Irish acts	Sold	Genre	Years active	Notes
1. U2	170 Million +	Rock	1976 – present (49 Years)	
2. Enya	80 Million +	Celtic/new-age	1986 – present (39 Years)	
3. Westlife	55 Million +	Pop	1998 – 2012, 2018 – present (27 Years)	
4. The Cranberries	50 Million +	Rock	1990–2003, 2009–2019 (35 Years)	
5. Van Morrison	16.2 Million +	Celtic/Blue-Eyed Soul	1960 – present (66 Years)	

== Top 5 'most standout' Irish acts of all time ==
In 2010, PRS for Music conducted research to show which five Irish musicians or bands the public considered to be the 'most standout'. U2 topped the list with sixty-eight percent while Westlife, Van Morrison, Boyzone and The Cranberries came in 2nd, 3rd, 4th and 5th, respectively. The research also suggested that the 'top-five' had sold over 341 million albums up to March 2010.

Irish act	Percent	Genre
1. U2	68	Rock
2. Westlife	10.5	Pop
3. Van Morrison	10	Soul
4. Boyzone	7.5	Pop
5. The Cranberries	4	Rock

== See also ==
- Celtic music
- Sean-nós singing
- Lilting
- Irish traditional music session
- List of Irish ballads
- Irish rebel music
- List of Irish musicians
- List of All-Ireland Champions
- List of Irish music collectors
- List of Irish musical groups
- List of artists who reached number one in Ireland
- List of songs that reached number one on the Irish Singles Chart
- One Hit Wonders in Ireland

== Bibliography ==
- Boydell, Barra: A History of Music at Christ Church Cathedral, Dublin (Woodbridge: Boydell & Brewer, 2004).
- Boydell, Brian: A Dublin Musical Calendar, 1700–1760 (Dublin: Irish Academic Press, 1988).
- Boydell, Brian: Rotunda Music in Eighteenth-Century Dublin (Dublin: Irish Academic Press, 1992).
- Breathnach, Breandán: Folk Music and Dances of Ireland (Cork: Mercier Press, 1971).
- Breathnach, Breandán: Ceól Rince na hÉireann (Dublin: Oifig an tSoláthair, 1963 (vol. 1), 1976 (vol. 2), vol. 3 (1985)).
- Clayton-Lea, Tony & Taylor, Rogan: Irish Rock. Where it's Come From, Where it's At, Where it's Going (Dublin: Gill & Macmillan, 1992).
- Daly, Kieran Anthony: Catholic Church Music in Ireland, 1878–1903. The Cecilian Reform Movement (Dublin: Four Courts Press, 1995).
- Dervan, Michael (ed.): The Invisible Art. A Century of Music in Ireland, 1916–2016 (Dublin: New Island, 2016).
- Dwyer, Benjamin: Different Voices. Irish Music and Music in Ireland (Hofheim: Wolke, 2014).
- Fitzgerald, Mark & O'Flynn, John (ed.): Music and Identity in Ireland and Beyond (Aldershot: Ashgate, 2014).
- Fleischmann, Aloys (ed.): Music in Ireland. A Symposium (Cork: Cork University Press, 1952).
- Grindle, William Henry: Irish Cathedral Music. A History of Music at the Cathedrals of the Church of Ireland (Belfast: Institute of Irish Studies, Queen's University of Belfast, 1989).
- Hast, Dorothea & Scott, Stanley: Music in Ireland. Experiencing Music, Expressing Culture (New York: Oxford University Press, 2004).
- Hogan, Ita M.: Anglo-Irish Music, 1780–1830 (Cork: Cork University Press, 1966).
- Klein, Axel: Die Musik Irlands im 20. Jahrhundert (Hildesheim: Georg Olms, 1996).
- Klein, Axel: Irish Classical Recordings. A Discography of Irish Art Music (Westport, Conn.: Greenwood Press, 2001).
- Mangaoang, Áine; O'Flynn, John & Ó Briain, Lonán (ed.): Made in Ireland: Studies in Popular Music. (Routledge, 2020). ISBN 978-1-138-93652-2.
- McAvoy, Mark: Cork Rock: From Rory Gallagher to the Sultans of Ping (Cork: Mercier Press, 2009).
- McCarthy, Marie: Passing it on. The Transmission of Music in Irish Culture (Cork: Cork University Press, 1999).
- Ó Canainn, Tomás: Traditional Music in Ireland (London: Routledge & Kegan Paul, 1978; new ed. Cork: Ossian Publications, 1993).
- O'Connor, Nuala: Bringing it all back home. The Influence of Irish Music (London: BBC Books, 1991; rev. ed. Dublin: Merlin Publications, 2001).
- Ó Dochartaigh, Seóirse: Sunlight & Shadow. A Listener's Guide to Irish Classical Music (Leckemy, Co. Donegal: Seóirse Ó Dochartaigh, 2016).
- O'Dwyer, Simon: Prehistoric Music of Ireland (Stroud, Gloucestershire: Tempus Publishing, 2004).
- Pine, Richard: Music and Broadcasting in Ireland (Dublin: Four Courts Press, 2005).
- Pine, Richard & Acton, Charles (eds.): To Talent Alone. The Royal Irish Academy of Music, 1848–1998 (Dublin: Gill & Macmillan, 1998).
- Porter, James: The Traditional Music of Britain and Ireland: A Select Bibliography and Research Guide (New York: Garland Publishing, 1989).
- Power, Vincent: Send 'Em Home Sweatin'. The Showband Story (Cork: Mercier Press, 1990; rev. ed. 2000).
- Prendergast, Mark J.: Irish Rock. Roots, Personalities, Directions (Dublin: O'Brien Press, 1987).
- Shields, Hugh: Narrative Singing in Ireland (Dublin: Irish Academic Press, 1993).
- Smith, Thérèse: Ancestral Imprints. Histories of Irish Traditional Music and Dance (Cork: Cork University Press, 2012).
- Smyth, Gerry: Noisy Island. A Short History of Irish Popular Music (Cork: Cork University Press, 2005).
- Smyth, Gerry & Campbell, Seán: Beautiful Day. Forty Years of Irish Rock (Cork: Atrium Press, 2005).
- Vallely, Fintan: The Companion to Irish Traditional Music (Cork: Cork University Press 1999), ISBN 1-85918-148-1.
- Wallis, Geoff & Wilson, Sue: The Rough Guide to Irish Music (London: Rough Guides Ltd., 2001), ISBN 1-85828-642-5.
- Walsh, Basil: Michael W. Balfe. A Unique Victorian Composer (Dublin: Irish Academic Press, 2008), ISBN 978-0-7165-2947-7.
- Walsh, Basil: Catherine Hayes, The Hibernian Prima Donna(Dublin: Irish Academic Press, 2000), ISBN 0-7165-2662-X.
- Walsh, T.J.: Opera in Dublin, 1705–1797. The Social Scene (Dublin: Allen Figgis, 1973).
- Walsh, T.J.: Opera in Dublin, 1798–1820. Frederick Jones and the Crow Street Theatre (Oxford: Oxford University Press, 1993).
- White, Harry: The Keeper's Recital. Music and Cultural History in Ireland, 1770–1970 (Cork: Cork University Press, 1998).
- White, Harry & Boydell, Barra: The Encyclopaedia of Music in Ireland (Dublin: UCD Press, 2013).
- Zimmermann, Georges-Denis: Songs of Irish Rebellion. Political Street Ballads and Rebel Songs, 1780–1900 (Dublin: Allen Figgis, 1967; 2nd ed. Dublin: Four Courts Press, 2002).
