= McCarville =

McCarville is a surname. Notable people with the surname include:

- Gerry McCarville (born 1955/1956), Irish Gaelic footballer who played for Monaghan
- Janel McCarville (born 1982), American basketball player
- Krista McCarville (born 1982), Canadian curler
- Maureen McCarville (born 1958), American politician in Wisconsin
- Mike McCarville, Canadian curler
- Paul McCarville (1901–1979), American politician in Iowa

== See also ==
- McCarvill
- Mac Cearbhaill, a Gaelic Irish clan
