= Ferdomhnach Dall =

Ferdomhnach Dall, Lector of Kildare and harpist, died 1110.

The Annals of Ulster for 1110 list the death of three Irish churchmen, including:

Ferdomhnach Dall fer leiginn Cille Dara .i. sui cruitirechta

Ferdomnach the blind, lector of Cell Dara, i.e. a master of harping

Ferdomhnach held the important post of fer leiginn (lector), an office associated with men such as Áed Ua Forréid (d. 1056) and Áed Ua Crimthainn (fl. 12th century), though it was also understood in the sense of a man of learning. He is perhaps the earliest attested Irish musician noted by name, specifically a sui cruitirechta/a master of harping.

== See also ==
- Clàrsach
- Amhlaeibh Mac Innaighneorach, d. 1168.
- Aed mac Donn Ó Sochlachain, d. 1224.
- Maol Ruanaidh Cam Ó Cearbhaill, murdered 1329.
- Turlough O'Carolan, 1670-1738.
