= John Francis Larchet =

Irish composer and teacher

John Francis Larchet (13 July 1884 – 10 August 1967) was an Irish composer and teacher. He studied at Trinity College Dublin (MusB 1915, MusD 1917), also at the Royal Irish Academy of Music (RIAM) with Michele Esposito. Larchet was music director at the Abbey Theatre from 1908 to 1935 and was therefore responsible for the stage music accompanying many of the pivotal plays of the Irish Literary Renaissance, in particular those of William Butler Yeats, and also had his ballet Bluebeard performed there (in 1932), including the dancer Ninette de Valois. Although a prolific composer and arranger, his main contribution to Irish music was as a teacher: He taught harmony and counterpoint at the Royal Irish Academy of Music between 1920 and 1955 and was Professor of Music at University College Dublin between 1921 and 1958. Among his pupils were Frank Ll. Harrison (1905–1987), Elizabeth Maconchy (1907-1994), Michael Bowles (1909–1998), Frederick May (1911–1985), Walter Beckett (1914–1996), Joan Trimble (1915–2000), Brian Boydell (1917–2000), T.C. Kelly (1917–1985), Havelock Nelson (1917–1996), Gerard Victory (1921–1995), and Seóirse Bodley (1933–2023).

Larchet was primarily a composer of miniatures and an arranger of Irish folksongs for classical ensembles. His arrangement (in 1954) of the Irish national anthem is the official version still in use today.

His daughter, Sheila Larchet Cuthbert (b. 1923), is an Irish harpist and author. She published The Irish Harp Book: A Tutor and Companion (Dublin, 1975; 5/2004).

== Selected works ==
Stage

- The Land of Heart's Desire, incidental music to play by W. B. Yeats (date?)
- Deirdre of the Sorrows, incidental music to play by W. B. Yeats (1907)
- The Spell, incidental music to play by Bernard Duffy (c.1916)
- The Pipe in the Fields, incidental music to play by T. C. Murray (c.1927)
- The Cat and the Moon, incidental music to play by W. B. Yeats (1931)
- The Dreaming of the Bones, incidental music to play by W. B. Yeats, scored for voice, flute and zither (1931)
- Bluebeard, ballet (1932)

Orchestral

- Lament for Youth (1939), published as 'Caoineadh na hÓige', Dublin: Oifig an tSoláthair, 1940
- The Dirge of Ossian & MacAnanty's Reel (1940) for string orchestra, London: Goodwin & Tabb, 1943
- Two Characteristic Pieces (based on traditional Irish Airs), London: Elkin & Co., 1952
- Marcia, quasi Scherzo (1955), published as 'Máirseáil, de shórt Meidhréiseach', Dublin: Oifig Díolta Foilseachán Rialtais, n.d.
- By the Waters of Moyle (1957)

Chamber music

- Irish Dance No. 1 for violin & piano, London: Weekes & Co., 1911
- Irish Airs for violin & piano, Dublin: Pigott & Co., c.1926

Choral

- The Legend of Lough Rea (text by 'Lageniensis'), London: Stainer & Bell, 1920
- At the Mid-Hour of Night (Thomas Moore), arr. for satb, Dublin: Pigott & Co., 1923
- Éamonn an Chnuich (trad.), arr. for ssaa; Dublin: Pigott & Co., c.1931
- An Caitín Bán (trad.), arr., Dublin: Pigott & Co., 1934
- An Spáilpín Fánach (trad.), arr., Dublin: Pigott & Co., 1935
- Róisín Dubh (trad.), arr., Dublin: Pigott & Co., 1937
- Peata an mhaoir (P. Breathnach), Dublin: Pigott & Co., 1953
- Sancti venite (Eoin McNeill) for satb, organ (1954)
- Ave Maria stella. Motet (1957)
- Three Motets (1961)

Songs

- In Sweet Humility (J. Taylor), London: Moore, Smith & Co., 1906
- Love, and a Garden (H. Wyles), London: C. Woolhouse, 1906
- Love's Question (H. Wyles), London: C. Woolhouse, 1906
- The Philosophy of Love (Percy Bysshe Shelley), London: Boosey & Co., 1908
- In Sweet Humility (Jane Taylor), London: Evans, 1910
- Pádraic the Fiddiler (Pádraic Gregory) with violin obbl., London: Boosey & Co., 1919
- An Ardglass Boat Song (Pádraic Gregory), London: Stainer & Bell, 1920
- A Stóirin Bán (Pádraic Gregory), London: Boosey & Co., 1922
- Sliabh na Mban (trad.), arr., Dublin: Pigott & Co., 1934
- The Song of the Faery Child (1935)
- Diarmuid's Lament (Michael MacLiammóir), Dublin: Pigott & Co., 1937
- The Stranger. An Old Gaelic Rune (anon.), London: Stainer & Bell, 1939
- The Thief of the World (Francis A. Fahy), London: Boosey & Co., 1939
- The Wee Boy in Bed (Elizabeth Shane), London: Boosey & Co., 1943
- The Cormorant (Emily Lawless), London: Stainer & Bell, 1947
- Wee Hughie (Elizabeth Shane), London: Stainer & Bell, 1947
- The Castle of Dromore (Harold Boulton), Dublin: Pigott & Co., 1949
- The Small Black Rose (Donal O'Sullivan) (1955) for voice and harp, Cork: Mercier Press, 1975
- Gleann Beag Lághach an Cheoil ('Torna'), Dublin: Pigott & Co., n.d.

== Recordings ==
- The Dirge of Ossian & MacAnanty's Reel: Radio Éireann Symphony Orchestra, cond. Milan Horvat, on Decca DL 9844 (LP, 1956).
- Peata an Mhaoir: RTÉ Singers, cond. Hans Waldemar Rosen, on Harmonia Mundi HMS 30691 (LP, 1965).
- Wee Hughie: Bernadette Greevy (Mez) & Jeannie Reddin (pf), on Argo ZRG 5459 (LP, 1966).
- The Stranger: Mary Hegarty (S), Ingrid Surgenor (pf), on: ASV CD WHL 2091 (CD, 1994).
- By the Waters of Moyle: RTÉ Sinfonietta, cond. Proinnséas Ó Duinn, on Marco Polo 8.223804 (CD, 1996).
- The Dirge of Ossian & MacAnanty's Reel: Irish Chamber Orchestra, cond. Fionnuala Hunt, on: Black Box Music BBM 1003 (CD, 1997).
- Pádraic the Fiddiler, An Ardglass Boat Song, A Stóirin Bán, The Wee Boy in Bed, Wee Hughie: Bernadette Greevy (Mez) & Hugh Tinney (pf), on A Sheaf of Songs from Ireland. Marco Polo 8.225098 (CD, 1998).
- Lament for Youth (in a band arrangement by Fritz Brase), performed by Band of the Defence Forces School of Music, Mark Armstrong (cond.), on: RTÉ lyric fm CD 153 (CD, 2016).
- The Philosophy of Love; In Sweet Humility; Love's Question; Love and a Garden; Pádraic the Fiddiler; An Ardglass Boat Song; Irish Airs, Vol. 1 A Stóirin Bán; The Bard of Armagh; The Song of the Faery Child; Diardmuid's Lament; The Thief of the World; Irish Airs, Vol. 2; The Stranger; The Wee Boy in Bed; The Cormorant; Wee Hughie; The Small Black Rose: Raphaela Mangan (Mez), Gavan Ring (Bar), Mia Cooper (vn), Verity Simmons (vc), Niall Kinsella (pf), on: Champs Hill Records CHR CD 151 (CD, 2020).
