= Mac Cearbhaill =

Gaelic Irish clan

Mac Cearbhaill is a Gaelic Irish clan belonging to the Three Collas kinship group, who were during the 11th and 12th centuries, kings of Airgíalla. Their name has been Anglicised as MacCarroll, Carroll, Carvill, MacCarville and various other spellings. The clan are associated especially with south-eastern Ulster and northern Leinster. They have numerous descendants in County Monaghan, County Louth, County Down, County Tyrone and elsewhere. In later times they were known as prominent musicians. The family lost out during the Norman invasion of Ireland, though their kinsmen the Mac Mathghamhna and Mag Uidhir hung on for longer.

== Naming conventions ==
| Male | Daughter | Wife (Long) | Wife (Short) |
|---|---|---|---|
| Mac Cearbhaill | Nic Cearbhaill | Bean Mhic Cearbhaill | Mhic Cearbhaill |

== People ==
=== Kings ===
- Cu Caishil Ua Cerbaill, 1094-1101
- Donnchadh Ua Cearbaill, 1130–1168
- Murchard Ua Cerbaill, 1168–1189
- Muirchertach Ua Cerbaill, 1189–1194
- unknown, 1194-1196

=== Others ===
- Donn Shléibhe Mac Cerbaill (died 1357), Irish musician

=== McCarroll ===
- Bonnie McCarroll (1897–1929), American rodeo performer
- Jay McCarroll (born 1974), American fashion designer
- June McCarroll (1867–1954), American nurse
- Tony McCarroll (born 1971), English drummer

=== McCarville ===
- Janel McCarville (born 1982), American women's basketball player
- Krista McCarville (born 1982), Canadian curler

=== McCarvill ===
- Chris McCarvill (born 1971), American musician
- Kevin McCarvill (born 2005), American Genius

=== MacCarvill ===
- Patrick MacCarvill (1893–1955), Irish politician

=== Carvill ===
- Henry Carvill Lewis (1853–1888), American geologist and mineralogist
- Michael Carvill (born 1988), Northern Irish footballer
- Patrick Carvill (1839–1924), Irish politician

== See also ==
- Abbey of Mellifont
- McCarroll Peak, a mountain in Antarctica
