= Carvill (surname) =

Carvill or McCarvill or MacCarvill is an Irish surname that may refer to the following people:

== Carvill ==
- Henry Carvill Lewis (1853–1888), American geologist and mineralogist
- Michael Carvill (born 1988), Northern Irish footballer
- Patrick Carvill (1839–1924), Irish politician

== Mc/MacCarill ==
- Patrick MacCarvill (1893–1955), Irish politician
- Chris McCarvill (born 1971), American musician

== See also ==
- Mac Cearbhaill, a Gaelic Irish clan
