= Michael Bowles =

Irish conductor and composer

Irish conductor Michael Bowles (1909–1998) in 1950.

Michael Andrew Bowles (Irish: Micheál Ó Baoighil; 30 November 1909 – 6 April 1998) was an Irish conductor and composer, who was also active in New Zealand, the US, and England.

== Life ==
Bowles was born in Riverstown, County Sligo, and grew up in Boyle, County Roscommon. In 1924, he moved to Dublin with his family, where he studied the piano at the Read School and joined the Department of Education in 1927 to embark on a career as a civil servant. In 1932, he was persuaded by Fritz Brase to join the Army School of Music as a conducting pupil. After obtaining a BMus at University College Dublin he was seconded to the Army No. 2 Band in Cork and joined Radio Éireann in 1941 as Acting Director of Music, succeeding Vincent O'Brien. When, in 1942, this position became full-time, he resigned from the Army. From 1941 to 1948 he was the main conductor of the Radio Éireann Orchestra, but disagreements surrounding the orchestra's expansion in 1948 caused his resignation. On 6 June 1945, he married Kathleen FitzGerald, daughter of Irish politician Martin FitzGerald.

Bowles had suggested an enlargement of the orchestra to 65 players, with an eventual figure of 80 in mind, as early as 1946. The Irish government considered it essential to recruit musicians from outside Ireland, and "Bowles was directed to travel throughout Europe and audition suitable candidates", which he did in Paris, Lisbon, Rome, Berne, and Brussels in the summer of 1947. However, during his absence the then Director of Broadcasting at Radio Éireann decided to give conducting contracts to Jean Martinon and hold on to Bowles as second option only. "Michael Bowles, acting rather too hastily, offered his own resignation which was accepted."

Michael Bowles on his way to New Zealand (1950).

Bowles then emigrated to New Zealand, where he became the first permanent conductor of the New Zealand Symphony Orchestra (1950–3) at Wellington, then called the "National Orchestra of the New Zealand Broadcasting Service", having been warmly recommended by the English conductor Sir Adrian Boult. He conducted when the orchestra was filmed for the first time in 1952. Among his innovations was the introduction of a public subscription system. In 1953, he was awarded the Queen Elizabeth II Coronation Medal.

Bowles became a visiting professor at Indiana University in Bloomington, Indiana (1954–58) and subsequently the conductor of the Philharmonic Orchestra of Indianapolis (1958–63). Climate-related ill-health caused him to leave the United States, and he went to England to teach conducting at the Birmingham School of Music (1963–70).

On his return to Ireland in 1970, Bowles and his wife operated a B&B in Cork, and he held various short-term assignments, including director of the Cultural Relations Committee of the Department of Foreign Affairs (1975–77), during which time he lived in County Wicklow. In this period he conducted the RTÉ Symphony Orchestra for the last time on 16 and 17 January 1977 in Dublin (Gaiety Theatre) and Cork (City Hall). In old age he moved to Dublin, where he died in 1998.

Pete Briquette (born Patrick Martin Cusack) and Johnnie Fingers (born John Peter Moylett), members of the Irish new wave band The Boomtown Rats, are his nephews.

== Assessment ==
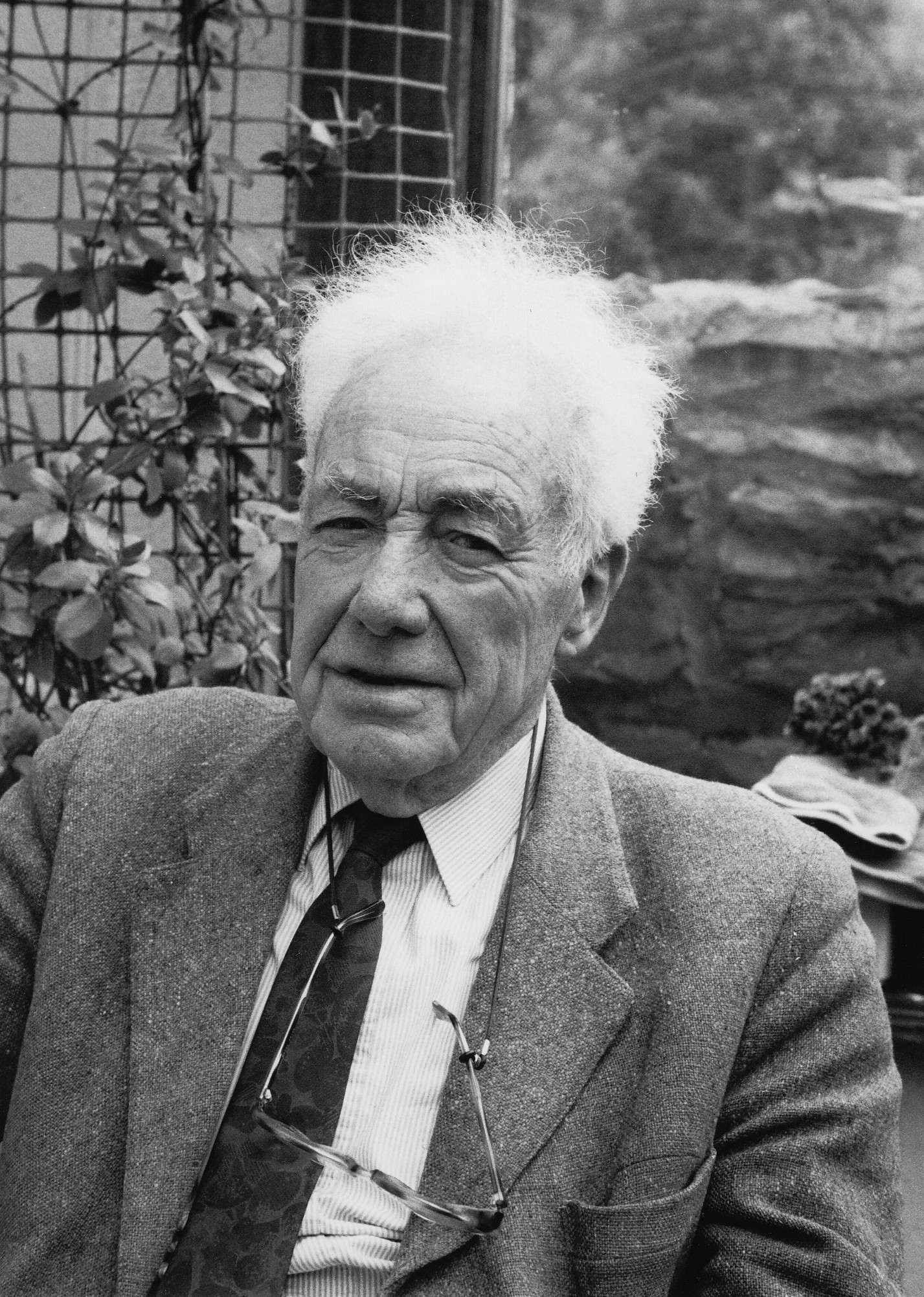
Michael Bowles (1909–1998) in Dublin, 1994.

In 1959, Bowles published the book The Art of Conducting, with a British edition in 1961 as The Conductor: His Artistry and Craftsmanship In the introduction, Sir Adrian Boult wrote: "I feel sure that his book will be welcomed as an important addition to the growing library of books on conducting, and will be of immense value to those who aspire to practise the art as well as to those whose interest in the music they hear encourages them to explore further the how and why of its problems."

In terms of his role in Irish musical life, Bowles' chief importance lies in his championship of contemporary Irish orchestral music at Radio Éireann during his tenure as director of music and principal conductor. Many works by key composers of this period such as Brian Boydell, Frederick May, Aloys Fleischmann, Éamonn Ó Gallchobhair, Redmond Friel, T.C. Kelly and others received their first performance under him, a list which also includes the concertos for violin (1942) and cello (1945) by E.J. Moeran.

In an obituary (1998), Joseph Ryan wrote: "His role in the consolidation and development of the Radio Éireann Symphony Orchestra has not been properly recognised and the current celebration marking the orchestra's fiftieth year is surely a case of revisionism gone mad. It may take some time, but history will furnish a more complete account of Bowles's contribution, particularly in the late 1930s and early 1940s."

== Music ==
Bowles' main ambition was conducting, thus he has never written much nor is his music in a particularly original or modern language. He preferred a tonal approach with stylistic precedents (in Ireland) in Charles V. Stanford and Hamilton Harty. He particularly enjoyed writing vocal music and produced settings of the mass, numerous songs and collections of traditional music.

== Selected works ==
Orchestra

- Slabhra fonn Gaedhealacha (1939)
- Three Pieces (1941)
- Slabhragh d'fhonnaibh Gaedhealacha (1942), for piano and string orchestra
- Divertimento for Strings (1943)

Vocal

- Anonn 's Anall, for female voices (Dublin: Pigott, 1937)
- Dosaen Amhrán do Leanbhai (A Dozen Songs for Children) (Dublin: Oifig an tSoláthair, 1943; new ed. 1976)
- Missa 'Ave Maria', for male voices (London: Cary & Co., 1948)
- Missa 'Maria immaculata', for mixed choir (London: Cary & Co., 1948)
- Missa 'Maria assumpta', for mixed choir (London: Cary & Co., 1949)
- Three Songs on Poems of Francis Thompson (1949–56; rev. 1982)
- Five Songs on Poems of James Stephens (1949–57; rev. 1982) (New York, 1957)
- Four Songs for the Children on Poems of James Stephens (1955–6; rev. 1982)
- Irish Songs, compiled by Burl Ives, edited with new piano accompaniments by Michael Bowles (New York: Duell, Sloan and Pearce, c. 1958)
- Plainsong Mass (Galway: Lynch, 1968)
- Claisceadal, 2 volumes of folksongs arrangements (Dublin: At the Sign of the Anchor, 1986)

== Bibliography ==
- Aloys Fleischmann (ed.): Music in Ireland: A Symposium (Cork: Cork University Press, 1952)
- Axel Klein: Die Musik Irlands im 20. Jahrhundert (Hildesheim: Georg Olms Verlag, 1996)
- Pat O'Kelly: The National Symphony Orchestra of Ireland 1948–1998, a Selected History (Dublin: RTÉ, 1998)
- Patrick Joseph Kehoe: The Evolution of the Radio Éireann Symphony Orchestra, 1926–1954; Ph.D. thesis, Dublin Institute of Technology Conservatory of Music and Drama, 2017
