= Carvill =

Carvill may refer to:

- Carvill (surname)
- Carvill Hall, a historic home in Maryland, United States
- Carvill Hurricane Index that describes the potential for damage from an Atlantic hurricane
