= Henry William Crosskey =

Henry William Crosskey (7 December 1826 – 1 October 1893) was an English Unitarian minister and geologist.

Crosskey was born at Lewes, Sussex. After being trained for the ministry at Manchester New College (1843–1848), he became pastor of Friargate chapel, Derby, until 1852, when he accepted charge of a Unitarian congregation in Glasgow. In 1869 he moved to Birmingham, where he remained as pastor of the Church of the Messiah until his death.

While in Glasgow his interest was awakened in geology by the perusal of A. C. Ramsay's Geology of the Isle of Arran, and from 1855 onwards he devoted his leisure to the pursuit of this science. He became an authority on glacial geology, and wrote much, especially in conjunction with David Robertson, on the Quaternary fossiliferous beds of Scotland (Trans. Geol. Soc. Glasgow).

He also prepared for the British Association a valuable series of Reports (1873–1892) on the erratic Blocks of England, Wales and Ireland. In conjunction with David Robertson and George Stewardson Brady (1832–1921) he wrote the Monograph of the Post Tertiary Entomostraca of Scotland, etc. for the Palaeontographical Society (1874); and he edited Henry Carvill Lewis's Papers and Notes on the Glacial Geology of Great Britain and Ireland, issued posthumously (1894). He died at Edgbaston, Birmingham, on 1 October 1893.
