= Mael Sechlainn Mac Carmaic =

Mael Sechlainn Mac Carmaic, Irish musician, died 1330.

Mael Sechlainn is called a brughaidh in the Irish language originals of several contemporary annals, which has been variously translated as general entertainer or rich and prosperous yeoman in English language editions. The word brughaidh itself occurs in later medieval texts, but it is used more clearly to define a rank in society than a responsibility for public hospitality. Passages in the Book of Fenagh name the brughaidh as next in rank to the taoiseach.

Thus his exact profession is uncertain, but he is notable as one of the very few professional people who were thought worthy enough to be mentioned in the extant Gaelic–Irish annals.

There was a branch of the O'Donnell dynasty named Mac Carmaic, apparently pre-dating the reign of Donnell Óg O'Donnell (d. 1281), several of whom became Bishop of Raphoe. Their earliest known ancestor was known only by the title "Fear léinn", variously translated as scholar or lector Descendants of this branch may have survived at least into the mid-17th century in the parishes of Clonleigh and Donaghmore, County Donegal.

== Bibliography ==
- Music and musicians in medieval Irish society, Ann Buckley, pp. 165–190, Early Music xxviii, no.2, May 2000
- Music in Prehistoric and Medieval Ireland, Ann Buckley, pp. 744–813, in A New History of Ireland, volume one, Oxford, 2005.
