= Pa Sheehy =

Irish singer-songwriter (born 1986/87)

- Born: 1986/1987 (age 38–39)
- Genres: Indie pop
- Occupation: Singer-songwriter
- Formerly of: Walking on Cars

Patrick "Pa" Sheehy (born 1986/1987) is an Irish singer-songwriter from Dingle, County Kerry.

== Career ==
Sheehy achieved some chart success in his native Ireland and across Europe as the lead singer of Walking on Cars. Since the 2020 break up of the band, Sheehy began releasing solo material. His debut single, "Saw You at a Funeral", was released in June 2021 with a follow-up single, titled "Roisin", released in August 2021. His debut EP, The Art of Disappearing, was released in September 2021, charting at number 9 in the Irish Albums Chart on the week of its launch.

Sheehy released his debut album, Maybe It Was All For This, in October 2024.

== Discography ==
=== EPs ===
- The Art of Disappearing (2021) – reached No. 9 Irish Albums Chart (1 week)

=== Singles ===
- "Saw You at a Funeral" (2021)
- "Róisín" (2021)
