= T. C. Kelly =

Irish composer (1917–1985)

Thomas Christopher Kelly (5 December 1917 – 31 March 1985) was an Irish composer, teacher and conductor.

== Life ==
T. C. Kelly was born in Wexford and studied with John F. Larchet at University College Dublin (BMus, 1943). After having spent a period as organist and choirmaster in Newry, County Down, he was appointed music master at Clongowes Wood College in County Kildare (1952–1985), a position which involved teaching, playing organ in the boys' chapel and conducting the school choir and orchestra. He won several national competitions with this choir. He was a well-known composer in mid-20th-century Ireland, albeit in a conservative idiom. Kelly died in Dublin.

== Music ==
Kelly's prolific output consists mainly of skilful arrangements of Irish traditional music for orchestra, mixed choir or small instrumental ensembles such as violin and piano. Although mainly known as a composer of miniatures, he also wrote a three-movement piano concerto (1960) and three full-scale congregational masses. Many of his orchestral arrangements and some original works were radio commissions for the then Radio Éireann Light Orchestra (today the RTÉ Concert Orchestra). In the 1960s and '70s some of his works were recorded on LP by EMI Ireland.

Kelly regarded himself as "bilingual" in a musical sense, having grown up both with traditional music and European art music at the same time. "Purely a lyric composer" in his own words, Kelly belonged to a group of conservative Irish composers who consciously eschewed more contemporary musical idioms. His music is tonal throughout and employs melodic traces of traditional music even in his original works.

== Selected works ==
Orchestral

- Three Pieces for Strings (1949)
- Variations on a Traditional Air (1949)
- Wexford Rhapsody (c1954) for "symphonic wind orchestra"
- Variations on the Bold Fenian Men (1956) for piano and orchestra
- Fantasia on Two Irish Airs (1958) for harp and orchestra
- Fantasia (1958) for harp and orchestra
- Piano Concerto (1960)
- Rhapsody on Children's Themes (1963) for piano and orchestra
- Dance Rhapsody No. 1 (1963) for violin and orchestra
- Dance Rhapsody No. 2 (1965) for violin and orchestra
- Concertino (1965) for piano and orchestra
- Capriccio (1965) for piano and orchestra
- The Dream and the Reality (1966)
- Interlude (1966) for cor anglais and orchestra
- Gaelic Suite No. 1 (1974)
- O'Carolan Suite in Baroque Style (1977) for violin and orchestra

Chamber music

- Suite for Military Band (1979) for brass band
- Irish Tunes (2 vols.; publ. 1984) for violin and keyboard
- many undated folksong arrangements for violin and piano, piano trio etc.

Piano music

- Four Interludes (1949)
- Suite of Irish Airs (1953)
- Piano Sonata in D major (1958)

Choral music

- The Sally Gardens (Patrick Joseph McCall) (1948; rev. 1960)
- Everlasting Voices (W. B. Yeats) (1959)
- Lament for O'Donovan Rossa (Peadar Ó hAnnracháin) (1967) for speaker, chorus and orchestra
- The Croppy Boy (William B. McBurney) (1974)
- Go Now and Dream (Thomas Moore) (1974) for soprano, mezzo, chorus and piano
- Mass in Gregorian Style (1974)
- Mise Raiftearai (Anthony Raftery) (1975)
- Mass for Peace (1976)
- Mass in Honour of Our Lady of Loreto (1980)
- numerous folksong arrangements

Songs

- The Sally Gardens (P.J. McCall) (1947)
- The Cloney Carol (Dorothy Mabel Large) (1955)
- Connaught Love Song (trad.) (1967)
- Crónán na mbeach (trad.) (1967)
- The Lake Isle of Innisfree (W. B. Yeats) (1967)

== Recordings ==
- Three Pieces for Strings, performed by Radio Éireann Symphony Orchestra, Milan Horvat (cond.), on: Decca DL 9844 (LP, 1956).
- Mass for Peace, performed by Clonliffe College Choir, T.C. Kelly (cond.), on: Network Tapes NTO 55C (MC, 1977).
- Three Pieces for Strings and O'Carolan Suite in Baroque Style, performed by Irish Chamber Orchestra, Fionnuala Hunt (cond.), on: Black Box Music BBM 1003 (CD, 1997).
- The Mother, performed by Rachel Kelly (Mez) and Una Hunt (pf), on: RTÉ lyric fm CD 153 (CD, 2016).

== Bibliography ==
- Edgar M. Deale: A Catalogue of Contemporary Irish Composers (Dublin: Music Association of Ireland, 1968; 2/1972)
- Bernard Harrison (ed.): Catalogue of Contemporary Irish Music (Dublin: Irish Composers' Centre, 1982)
- Axel Klein: Irish Classical Recordings — A Discography of Irish Art Music (Westport, Connecticut: Greenwood Press, 2001)
- Richard Pine: Music and Broadcasting in Ireland (Dublin: Four Courts Press, 2005)
