= Walking on Cars =

Irish rock band

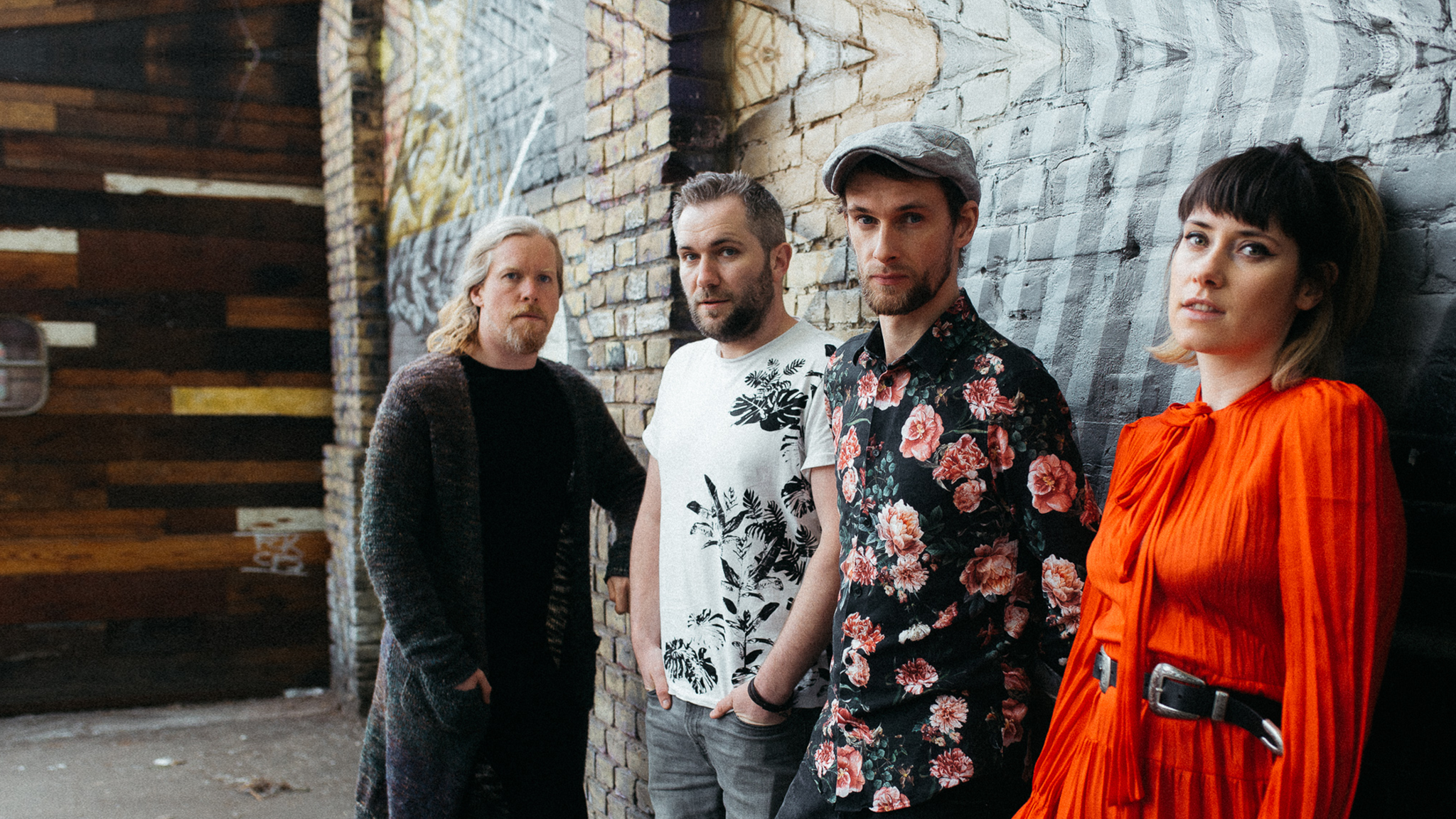
- Walking on Cars in 2019. L–R: Paul Flannery, Evan Hadnett, Patrick Sheehy, Sorcha Durham

Background information
- Origin: Dingle, County Kerry, Ireland
- Genre: Indie pop
- Years active: 2009–2020
- Label: Virgin EMI
- Past members: Pa Sheehy; Sorcha Durham; Paul Flannery; Evan Hadnett; Dan Devane
- Website: walkingoncars.com

Walking on Cars was a four-piece Irish rock band, whose 2020 lineup consisted of Pa Sheehy (vocals), Sorcha Durham (piano), Paul Flannery (bass), and Evan Hadnett (drums). Their first single, "Catch Me If You Can", released in 2012, went to no. 1 on the Irish iTunes chart. The band released their debut EP, As We Fly South, in 2013, and a second one, Hand in Hand, in 2014. Their first full-length album, Everything This Way, came out in January 2016, peaking at no. 1 in Ireland. Their second record, Colours, was published in April 2019.

The band announced its split in August 2020, on the same date that a final six-track EP, called Clouds, was released.

== History ==
=== Formation and early years ===
In 2010, five school friends—Pa Sheehy (vocals), Sorcha Durham (piano), Paul Flannery (bass), Evan Hadnett (drums), Dan Devane (guitar)—started performing at local venues and clubs in their hometown of Dingle, County Kerry. Committing wholly to their musical ambitions, the band went on to rent a house on the Dingle Peninsula and lock themselves away for the purpose of writing and recording demos. "The place we rented was a really old cottage, where we had no television, no phone, no Internet, no transport," says Sorcha, "We were there for 6 months – just our equipment and us. It was an amazing time, ideas were constantly flowing."

In 2012, Walking on Cars won the Red Bull Bedroom Jam competition and gained extensive radio play with their debut single, "Catch Me If You Can". As a result, the track reached no. 27 in the Irish Singles Chart, where it remained for over 20 weeks. The song also reached no. 1 on iTunes and garnered over 450,000 views on YouTube.

Walking on Cars released the four-song EP As We Fly South in 2013. It was recorded in Attica Studios, Termon, and produced by Tom McFall (R.E.M, Snow Patrol, Bloc Party, Editors). In July 2014, they issued the tracks "Hand in Hand" and "Always Be with You".

=== Chart success ===
In 2016, Walking on Cars released their first full-length album, Everything This Way. It went double platinum and reached number one on album charts in Ireland as well as charting in several other European countries.

In 2020, the band's single "Monster" was used as the opening theme of the Netflix series The Stranger.

=== Split and Pa Sheehy solo work ===
In August 2020, coinciding with the release of the EP Clouds, the band announced that they had split up.

In 2021, vocalist Pa Sheehy launched a solo career. His debut single, "I Saw You at a Funeral", was released in June, with the follow-up single, "Roisin", coming out in August.

== Band members ==
- Pa Sheehy – vocals, piano, guitar (2010–2020)
- Sorcha Durham – piano, backing vocals (2010–2020)
- Paul Flannery – bass, backing vocals (2010–2020)
- Evan Hadnett – drums, percussion (2010–2020)
- Dan Devane – guitar (2010–2018)

== Discography ==
Walking on Cars discography
- Studio albums: 2
- EPs: 3
- Singles: 8
- Music videos: 10

=== Studio albums ===
| Year | Details | Peak chart positions | | | | | Certifications |
| Year | Details | IE | BE | DE | NL | UK | Certifications |
|---|---|---|---|---|---|---|---|
| 2016 | Everything This Way: Released: 29 January 2016; Label: Virgin EMI; Formats: CD, download | 1 | 157 | 23 | 76 | 26 | IE: double platinum |
| 2019 | Colours: Released: 12 April 2019; Label: Virgin EMI; Formats: CD, download | 2 | 200 | 7 | -- | 50 | |

=== EPs ===
| Year | Details | Irish album chart positions |
|---|---|---|
| 2013 | As We Fly South: Released: 21 June 2013; Label: Independent | |
| 2014 | Hand in Hand: Released: 1 January 2014; Label: Virgin EMI | |
| 2020 | Clouds: Released: 21 August 2020; Label: Walking on Cars/Independent | 13 |

=== Singles ===
| Title | Year | Peak chart positions | | | | | | | | | Certifications | Album |
| Title | Year | IRL | IRL Hom. | NZ | AUT | GER | SWI | BEL | NL | UK | Certifications | Album |
|---|---|---|---|---|---|---|---|---|---|---|---|---|
| "Catch Me If You Can" | 2013 | 27 | N/a | — | — | — | — | — | — | — | | Everything This Way |
| "Two Stones" | 2013 | 12 | N/a | — | — | — | — | — | — | — | | Everything This Way |
| "Tick Tock" | 2013 | 8 | N/a | — | — | — | — | — | — | — | | Everything This Way |
| "Hand in Hand" | 2014 | 19 | N/a | — | — | — | — | — | — | — | | Everything This Way |
| "Always Be with You" | 2014 | 39 | N/a | — | — | — | — | — | — | — | | Everything This Way |
| "Speeding Cars" | 2015 | 11 | N/a | 16 | 17 | 18 | 18 | 20 | 46 | 87 | | Everything This Way |
| "Monster" | 2018 | — | 14 | — | — | — | — | — | — | — | | Colours |
| "Coldest Water" | 2019 | 72 | 12 | — | — | — | — | — | — | — | | Colours |
"—" denotes a title that did not chart. Irish Homegrown Top 20 chart did not exist before 7 June 2019

=== Music videos ===
| Title | Year | Director |
|---|---|---|
| "Two Stones" | 2013 | Luke Daly |
| "Tick Tock" | 2013 | —N/a |
| "Hand in Hand" | 2014 | Luke Daly |
| "Always Be with You" | 2015 | Filmawi & Esrael |
| "Catch Me If You Can" | 2015 | —N/a |
| "Speeding Cars" | 2015 | Luke Daly and Nathan Fagan (Luna) |
| "Don't Mind Me" | 2016 | Luke Daly and Nathan Fagan (Luna) |
| "Monster" | 2019 | Luke Daly and Nathan Fagan (Luna) |
| "Coldest Water" | 2019 | Luke Daly and Nathan Fagan (Luna) |
| "Too Emotional" | 2019 | —N/a |
