= Amhlaeibh Mac Innaighneorach =

Amhlaeibh Mac Innaighneorach, Chief Harper of Ireland, died 1168.

Mac Innaighneorach is one of the earliest recorded Irish professional musicians. The Annals of the Four Masters call him the chief ollamh of Ireland in harp-playing but provide no other details of his life.

The existence of his obituary is thought to denote his profession's newly acquired respectability, as there are very few direct references to professional musicians in Ireland prior to his lifetime. Nevertheless, musicians would never hold the same esteem as poets, lawyers and historians in Gaelic culture.

== See also ==
- Clàrsach
- Ferdomhnach Dall, d. 1110
- Aed mac Donn Ó Sochlachain, d. 1224.
- Maol Ruanaidh Cam Ó Cearbhaill, murdered 1329.
