= Magrath Ó Fionnachta =

Magrath Ó Fionnachta (died 1361) was an Irish musician.

Ó Fionnachta was a member of one of several families that claimed descent from the Síol Muireadhaigh dynasty of the Ui Briuin of Connacht. They generally resided along the banks of the River Suck, on the border of what is now County Roscommon and County Galway.

Under the year 1361, The Annals of the Four Masters preserve his obituary:

Magrath Ó Fionnachta, Chief Musician and Tiompanist to the Sil-Murray, died.

The instrument he played was an tiompan Gàidhealach, not the timpani.

The surname is now generally rendered as Finnerty.
