= Aed mac Donn Ó Sochlachain =

Aed mac Donn Ó Sochlachain (died 1226) was Erenagh of Cong and an Irish musician.

Ó Sochlachain was one of the earliest Irish musicians described in the extant Irish annals, denoting the respect the profession had acquired in recent generations. The Annals of Connacht describe him as the:

erenagh of Cong, a man eminent for chanting and for the right tuning of harps and for having made an instrument for himself which none had made before, distinguished also in every art such as poetry, engraving and writing and in every skilled occupation, died this year.

== See also ==
- Clàrsach
- Amhlaeibh Mac Innaighneorach, d. 1168
- Maol Ruanaidh Cam Ó Cearbhaill, murdered 1329
- Turlough O'Carolan, 1670–1738

== Bibliography ==
- Ann Buckley: "Musical Instruments in Ireland from the Ninth to the Fourteenth Centuries: A Review of the Organological Evidence", in: Gerald Gillen and Harry White (eds), Irish Musical Studies, vol. 1: Musicology in Ireland (Blackrock, Co. Dublin: Irish Academic Press, 1990), pp. 13–57.
- A. Buckley: "Music and Musicians in Medieval Irish Society" in: Early Music vol. 28, no. 2 (May 2000), pp. 165–190.
- A. Buckley: "Music in Ireland to c.1500", in: A New History of Ireland, vol. 1, ed. by F. X. Martin, F. J. Byrne, W. E. Vaughan, A. Cosgrove, J. R. Hill (Oxford: Oxford University Press, 2005), pp. 744–813.
