= John Kinsella (composer) =

Irish composer (1932–2021)

- Born: 8 April 1932; Dublin, Ireland
- Died: 9 November 2021 (aged 89)
- Education: College of Music
- Movement: serialism
- Relatives: Thomas Kinsella

John Kinsella (8 April 1932 – 9 November 2021) was an Irish composer and the country's most prolific symphonist during the twentieth century.

== Life ==
Kinsella was born in Dublin, Ireland, the younger brother of the poet and editor Thomas Kinsella. He studied viola at the College of Music (now the DIT Conservatory of Music and Drama) in Dublin and took private composition lessons with Éamonn Ó Gallchobhair for a brief period. He developed an early interest in serialism and began to explore many of the techniques evolved by the contemporary European avant-garde. Supported by Gerard Victory and the conductor Hans Waldemar Rosen he had a number of works accepted for performance by RTÉ ensembles, including his first two string quartets (1960, 1968), a chamber concerto (1964), Montage (1965) for soprano and chamber ensemble, Two Pieces for String Orchestra (1965), and Montage II (1970) for orchestra. This group of works culminated in A Selected Life (1973), a large-scale composition based on verses written in memory of the recently deceased Seán Ó Riada by his brother Thomas.

In 1968, he was appointed senior assistant in the music department of RTÉ. As he found himself growing increasingly disillusioned with the avant-garde his attitude to his own work began to change: he came to question the artistic validity of much of what he had written. After completing his String Quartet No. 3 (1977) he stopped composing for 18 months. When Kinsella resumed composition it was with a resolve to find his own distinctive creative voice regardless of current fashions. The first work he composed in this new spirit of independence was The Wayfarer: Rhapsody on a Poem of P.H. Pearse (1979), commissioned for the centenary of Pearse's birth.

Kinsella received the Marten Toonder Award in 1979 and became a founder member of Aosdána in 1981. He succeeded Victory as Head of Music in RTÉ in 1983, but took early retirement in 1988 (the year he completed his Symphony No. 2) to devote himself fully to composition. As part of an arrangement made with RTÉ on his retirement, the station undertook to commission a series of large-scale orchestral works from him.

He died in Dublin on 9 November 2021, at the age of 89.

== Music ==
Kinsella's music until about 1977 was strongly influenced by the contemporary European avant-garde, mainly serialism. Later, in De Barra's words (2013), "(t)he idiom Kinsella evolved […] seeks to reclaim from the twelve-tone series the structuring force of tonal attraction. He organises and manipulates the row so that fundamental pitches released from it can function as substitutes for traditional tonal centres."

Although Kinsella composed both choral and vocal works, his primary interest was in instrumental music, and his most distinguished work is to be found in his string quartets, concertos and particularly his symphonies.

== Selected compositions ==
Orchestral

- Two Pieces for String Orchestra (1965)
- Cello Concerto [no. 1] (1967)
- Rondo for Orchestra (1969)
- Montage II (1970)
- Music for Cello and Chamber Orchestra (1971)
- The Wayfarer: Rhapsody on a Poem of P.H. Pearse (1979)
- Essay for Orchestra (1980)
- Violin Concerto No. 1 (1981)
- Sinfonietta (1983)
- Symphony No. 1 (1984)
- Rhapsody on a Poem of Francis Ledwidge (1987), for 2 solo violins and orchestra
- Symphony No. 2 (1988)
- Violin Concerto No. 2 (1989)
- Symphony No. 3, "Joie de vivre" (1990)
- Nocturne (1990), for cello and string orchestra
- Symphony No. 4, "The Four Provinces" (1991)
- Symphony No. 6 (1993)
- Two Slow Airs (1993), for accordion and orchestra
- Festive Overture (1995)
- Cello Concerto [no .2] (2000)
- Hommage à Clarence (2001), for string orchestra
- Symphony No. 9 (2004), for string orchestra
- Prelude and Toccata for Wind Ensemble (2007)
- Cuchulainn & Ferdia: Duel at the Ford (2008)
- Elegy for Strings (2011)
- Symphony No. 10 (2012)
- Symphony No. 11 (2019), fp 29 November 2019, Dublin

Works for voices and orchestra

- A Selected Life (Thomas Kinsella) (1973), for tenor, speaker, mixed chorus, orchestra
- Symphony No. 5, "The 1916 Poets" (Joseph Mary Plunkett, Thomas MacDonagh, Patrick Pearse) (1992), for baritone, speaker, orchestra
- Symphony No. 7 (1997), for mixed chorus (wordless) and orchestra
- Symphony No. 8, "Into the New Millennium" (liturgical) (1999), for 3 boy sopranos and orchestra

Chamber music

- String Quartet No. 1 (1960)
- Clarinet Trio (1960)
- Chamber Concerto (1964), for violin and chamber ensemble
- String Quartet No. 2 (1968)
- Dialogue for Horn and Piano (1970)
- Dialogue for Bassoon and Piano (1972)
- Guitar Fantasy (1974), for guitar
- Rhapsody on a Poem of Joseph Campbell for viola solo (1975)
- String Quartet No. 3 (1977)
- Aberration (1980), for flute and piano
- Piano Quartet (1985)
- Synthesis (1987), for string quartet
- Dialogue for viola solo (1991)
- String Quartet No. 4 (1993)
- Symphony for Five (1996), for flute, clarinet, violin, cello, percussion
- Sonata for Two Violins (1996)
- Upstairs, Downstairs (1999), for cello and piano
- Prelude and Toccata (2006), for string quartet
- On Hearing Purcell and Shostakovitch at Bantry House: June 2008 (2009), for string quartet
- String Quartet No. 5 (2013)

== Recordings ==
- String Quartet No. 3, performed by the Vanbrugh Quartet, on: Chandos CHAN 9296 (CD, 1994).
- Symphonies No. 3 and No. 4, performed by the RTÉ National Symphony Orchestra of Ireland, Proinnsías Ó Duinn (cond.), on: Marco Polo 8.223766 (CD, 1997).
- Symphony No. 9; Hommage à Clarence; Nocturne for cello and string orchestra; Elegy for Strings; Prelude and Toccata for string orchestra, performed by the Irish Chamber Orchestra, Anthony Marwood (cond.), on Irish Chamber Orchestra label [no label code] (CD, 2011).
- Symphony No. 6; Symphony No. 7; Prelude and Toccata for string orchestra; Cúchullainn and Ferdia: Duel at the Ford, performed by the RTÉ National Symphony Orchestra of Ireland, the National Chamber Choir of Ireland, Proinnsías Ó Duinn (cond.), on: RTÉ lyric fm CD 134 (CD, 2011).
- Symphony No. 5 ("The 1916 Poets") and Symphony No. 10, performed by Gerard O'Connor (baritone), Bill Golding (speaker), RTÉ National Symphony Orchestra of Ireland, Colman Pearce (cond.) and the Irish Chamber Orchestra, Gábor Takács-Nagy (cond.), on: Toccata Classics TOCC 0242 (CD, 2014).
- Guitar Fantasy, performed by John Feeley, on: RTÉ lyric fm CD 153 (CD, 2016).

== Bibliography ==
- Axel Klein: Die Musik Irlands im 20. Jahrhundert (Hildesheim: Georg Olms Verlag, 1996)
- Séamas de Barra: The Symphonies of John Kinsella (doctoral thesis, Durham University, 2012), downloadable here
