= Elizabeth Shane =

Irish poet

- Born: Gertrude Elizabeth Heron Hine; 5 February 1877; Belfast, Ireland
- Died: 19 March 1951 (age 74); Annalong, County Down, Northern Ireland
- Occupations: violinist, poet
- Writing career
- Language: English, Mid-Ulster English
- Period: 1921–45

Gertrude Elizabeth Heron Shane (née Hine; 5 February 1877 – 19 March 1951) was an Irish poet, playwright and violinist born in Belfast and who lived much of her life in County Donegal. Among her best-known works is "Wee Hughie", a poem about a boy's first day at school.

== Bibliography ==
- Tales of the Donegal Coast and Islands (1921)
- By Bog and Sea in Donegal (1923/24)
- Piper's Tunes - From Donegal and Antrim (1927)
- The Preserving Pan (play, 1933)
- The Collected Poems of Elizabeth Shane Vol 1 (1945)
- The Collected Poems of Elizabeth Shane Vol 2 (1945)
