= Ann Buckley =

Irish musicologist

- Born: Dublin, Ireland

Academic background
- Education: National University of Ireland; University College Cork

Academic work
- Discipline: Musicology
- Institutions: Trinity College Dublin; Maynooth University

Ann Buckley is an Irish musicologist, born in Dublin.

== Biography ==
Buckley studied at University College Cork (B.Mus., 1971; M.A. 1972), "doctoraal examen" (equivalent to a master's degree) (University of Amsterdam, 1976) and a Ph.D. (University of Cambridge, 1991). She has held academic positions in Ireland, the United Kingdom, France, Belgium and Romania, including visiting professorships at the University of Paris IV–Sorbonne (2001–3) and at the European Union International Intensive Programme in Irish Studies at the Catholic University of Leuven and the University of Lille, 2000–3). She was Research Scholar at Corpus Christi College, Cambridge (1983–9) and subsequently a Research Fellow (1989–92) and Research Associate (1992–5) at Darwin College, Cambridge. Between 2003 and 2008 she was an IRCHSS Government of Ireland Research Fellow at Maynooth University. She is now a research associate at the Centre for Medieval and Renaissance Studies, Trinity College, Dublin.

== Publications ==
Without book reviews, CD booklets etc.

=== Edited volumes ===
- (with Karl-Olof Edström and Paul Nixon) Proceedings of the Second British-Swedish Conference on Musicology: Ethnomusicology (Cambridge, 5–10 August 1989) (= Skrifter från Musikvetenskapliga Institutionen, vol. 21) (Göteborg: Göteborgs Universitet, 1991).
- Proceedings of the First British-Swedish Conference on Musicology: Medieval Studies (Skara, 11–15 May 1988) (Stockholm: Royal Swedish Academy of Music, 1992).
- A Select Edition of Old French Lyric Lais, vol. 1 (Newton Abbot: Antico Edition, 1992).
- A Select Edition of Old French Lyric Lais, vol. 2 (Newton Abbot: Antico Edition, 1994).
- "Early Music of Ireland", special issue of Early Music, vol. 28 no. 2 (May 2000).
- Hearing the Past: Essays in Historical Ethnomusicology and the Archaeology of Sound (= Études et Recherches Archéologiques de l'Université de Liège, vol. 86) (Liège, 2000).
- (with Dominique Billy) Études de langue et de littérature romanes offertes à Peter T. Ricketts à l'occasion de son 70ème anniversaire (Brepols: Turnhout 2005).
- (with Cynthia Cyrus) Music, Dance and Society: Medieval and Renaissance Studies in Memory of Ingrid G. Brainard (Kalamazoo: Western Michigan University, 2011).
- 'Nobilitate vigens Furseus'. The Medieval Office of St Fursey: Lecture, with a Critical Edition of the Music and Text of the Office, and English Translation (Norwich: Fursey Pilgrims, 2014).
- Music, Liturgy and the Veneration of Saints of the Medieval Irish Church in a European Context (= Ritus et Artes, vol. 8) (Turnhout: Brepols, 2017).
- (with Lisa Colton) Music and Liturgy in Medieval Britain and Ireland (Cambridge: Cambridge University Press, 2022).

=== Book chapters ===
- "Jew's Harps in Irish Archaeology", in: Second Conference of the ICTM Study Group on Music Archaeology, ed. Cajsa S. Lund (Stockholm, 1986), pp. 49–71.
- "Musical Instruments from Medieval Dublin. A Preliminary Survey", in: The Archaeology of Early Music Cultures: Proceedings of the Third International Conference of the Study Group on Music Archaeology, ed. E. Hickmann and D. Hughes (Peter Lang: Bonn 1988), pp. 145–162.
- "Musical Instruments in Ireland from the 9th to the 14th Centuries: A Review of the Organological Evidence", in: Musicology in Ireland (= Irish Musical Studies, vol. 1), ed. Gerard Gillen and Harry White (Blackrock: Irish Academic Press, 1990), pp. 13–57.
- "Boundaries in the Field: What do they Serve? A Review of the Landscapes of Historical Musicology and Ethnomusicology", in: Proceedings of the Second British-Swedish Conference on Musicology: Ethnomusicology (see details under "Edited volumes") (Göteborg, 1991), pp. 39–59.
- "The Lyric Lai: Musicological, Philological, Cultural and Historical Questions" and "Ways of Looking", in: Proceedings of the First British-Swedish Conference on Musicology: Medieval Studies (see details under "Edited volumes") (Stockholm, 1992), pp. 189–234 and 235–243.
- "An Archaeological Survey of Musical Instruments in Medieval Ireland", in: Miscellanea archaeologica Thaddaeo Malinowski dedicata, ed. Franciszek Rożnowski (Słupsk and Poznań: Sorus, 1993), pp. 65–72.
- "Music and Humanisation as Long-term Process", in: 'Sons Originels': Préhistoire de la musique (= Études et Recherches Archéologiques de l'Université de Liège, vol. 61), ed. Marcel Otte (Liège, 1994), pp. 275–285.
- "L'Histoire de la musique médiévale: Musicologie archéologie, ou ethnomusicologie? Quelques problèmes disciplinaires de notre époque", in: La Pluridisciplinarité dans l'archéologie musicale. IVe rencontres internationales du Groupe d'études sur l'archéologie musicale de l'ICTM (Saint-Germain-en-Laye, 8–12 octobre 1990) (= Collection Recherche Musique et Danse, vols. 11–12), ed. Catherine Homo-Lechner and Annie Bélis (Paris: Éditions de la Maison des Sciences de l'Homme, 1994), vol. 1, pp. 501–512.
- "'And his voice swelled like a terrible thunderstorm ...': Music as Symbolic Sound in Irish Society", in: Music and Irish Cultural History (= Irish Musical Studies, vol. 3), ed. Gerard Gillen and Harry White (Blackrock: Irish Academic Press, 1995), pp. 11–74.
- "Music Archaeology: Its Contribution to 'Cultural' Musicology and 'Historical' Ethnomusicology", in: Studies in Socio-Musical Sciences, ed. Uri Sharvit and Yoahim Braun (Ramat Gan: Bar-Ilan University Press, 1998), pp. 109–115.
- "Representations of Musicians in John Derricke's 'The Image of Irelande' (1581)", in: Music, Words, and Images. Essays in Honour of Koraljka Kos, ed. Vjera Katalinić and Zdravko Blažeković (Zagreb: Hrvatsko Muzikolosko Drustvo [Croatian Musicological Society], 1999), pp. 77–91.
- "Organised Sound and Tonal Art in Long-term Perspective", in: Hearing the Past: Essays in Historical Ethnomusicology and the Archaeology of Sound (see details under "Edited volumes") (Liège, 2000), pp. 9–16.
- "Gypsy Musicians in Transylvania: Changing Lifestyles, Changing Status", in: Music, Language and Literature of the Roma and Sinti (= Intercultural Music Studies, vol. 11), ed. Max Peter Baumann and Linda Fujie (Berlin: Verlag für Wissenschaft und Bildung, 2000), pp. 309–319.
- "Abelard's 'Planctus' and Old French 'Lais': Melodic Style and Formal Structure", in: The Poetic and Musical Legacy of Heloise and Abelard, ed. Marc Stewart and David Wulstan (Ottawa: Institute of Medieval Music, 2003), pp. 49–59.
- "Representations of Musicians in Medieval Christian Iconography of Ireland and Scotland as Local Cultural Expression", in: Art and Music in the Early Modern Period. Essays in honor of Franca Trinchieri Camiz, ed. Katherine A. McIver (Aldershot: Ashgate, 2003), pp. 217–231.
- "Music of the Medieval Irish Church – A Preliminary Overview", in: Proceedings of the 1st Annual Conference of the Society for Musicology in Ireland, NUI Maynooth, 2–3 May 2003, ed. Barra Boydell (Maynooth: Society for Musicology in Ireland, 2004), pp. 20–28.
- "Abelard's 'Planctus virginum Israel super filia Iepte Galadite' and 'Li lais des puceles'", in: Études de langue et de littérature romanes offertes à Peter T. Ricketts [...] (see details under "Edited volumes") (Brepols: Turnhout 2005), pp. 545–570.
- "The Musical Instruments depicted at Clare Island", in: A New Survey of Clare Island, vol. 4: The Abbey, ed. Conleth Manning, Paul Gosling and John Waddell (Dublin: Royal Irish Academy, 2005), pp. 123–132.
- "Music in Ireland to c. 1500", in: A New History of Ireland, vol. 1: Prehistoric and Early Ireland, ed. Dáibhí Ó Cróinín (Oxford: Oxford University Press, 2005), pp. 744–813.
- "Between Hagiography and Liturgy: Fragmentary Offices for Irish Saints", in: A Carnival of Learning: Essays to Honour George Cunningham and His 50 Conferences on Medieval Ireland in the Cistercian Abbey of Mount St Joseph, Roscrea, 1987–2012, ed. Peter Harbison and Valerie Hall (Roscrea: Cistercian Press, 2012), pp. 41–52.
- "The Medieval Office of St Brigit", in: Treasures of Irish Christianity, vol. 2, ed. Brendan Leahy and Salvador Ryan (Dublin: Veritas, 2013), pp. 81–84.
- "Wandering Scholars and Saintly Cults: The Liturgical Legacy – in Homage to Helen Waddell", in: Helen Waddell Reassessed: New Readings, ed. Jennifer Fitzgerald (Bern etc.: Peter Lang, 2014), pp. 63–80.
- "From Hymn to 'Historia': The Veneration of Local Saints in the Medieval Irish Church", in: Music, Liturgy and Saints of the Medieval Irish Church in a European Context (see details under "Edited volumes") (Brepols: Turnhout 2017), pp. 161–183.
- "The Cambridge Songs as Anthology of Musical Knowledge", in: Aspects of Knowledge: Preserving and Reinventing Traditions of Learning in the Middle Ages, ed. Marilina Cesario and Hugh Magennis (Manchester: Manchester University Press, 2018), pp. 79–93.

=== Articles in journals and yearbooks ===
- "Notes on the Tiompán in Irish Literature", in: Studia Instrumentorum Musicae Popularis, vol. 5 (1977), pp. 84–90.
- "What was the Tiompán? A Study in Ethnohistorical Organology: Evidence in Irish Literature", in: Jahrbuch für musikalische Volks- und Völkerkunde, vol. 9 (1977), pp. 53–88.
- "An Irish Field Report from 1907: A Review of Methods", in: Newsletter of the UK Committee of the International Council for Traditional Music, vol. 15 (1978).
- "Considerations in a Stylistic Analysis of Uilleann Piping", in: Studia Instrumentorum Musicae Popularis, vol. 6 (1979), pp. 120–125.
- "A Note on the History and Archaeology of Jew's Harps in Ireland", in: North Munster Antiquaries Journal, vol. 25 (1983), pp. 29–35.
- "The Relevance of Literary Sources in the Archaeological Investigation of Musical Instruments", in: Cambridge Music-Archaeological Reports, vol. 6 (1983).
- "A Ceramic Signal Horn from Medieval Dublin", in: Archaeologia Musicalis, vol. 1 (1987), pp. 9–10.
- "A Viking Bow from 11th-Century Dublin", in: Archaeologia Musicalis, vol. 1 (1987), pp. 10–11.
- "Lyric Lais and the Use of Formulae", in: Musica antiqua Europae Orientalis: Acta Musicologica, vol. 1 (1988), pp. 193–207.
- "Music Archaeology: Its Contribution to 'Cultural' Musicology and 'Historical' Ethnomusicology", in: Archaeologia Musicalis, vol. 89 (1989) no. 1, pp. 109–113.
- "Harps and Lyres on Early Medieval Monuments of Britain and Ireland", in: Harpa, vol. 7 (1992), pp. 8–9 and 15–21.
- "Music in Medieval Irish Society", in: Harpa, vol. 11 (1993), pp. 19–31.
- "Professional Musicians, Dancing and Patronage: Continuity and Change in a Transylvanian Community", in: The World of Music, vol. 3 (1994), pp. 31–48.
- "Nationalism and the Politicisation of Popular Culture in 20th-Century Europe: Post-War Romania in a Comparative Perspective", in: Anuarul Institutului de Istorie Cluj-Napoca (Journal of the Institute of History, Academia Română, Filială din Cluj-Napoca [Romanian Academy of Sciences, Cluj Branch]), vol. 23 (1994), pp. 375–385.
- "Recent Publications in Music Archaeology"; review-article for RIdIM Newsletter (Newsletter of the Research Center for Musical Iconography), vol. 20 no. 2 (Fall 1995), pp. 68–72.
- "Developments in Irish Musicology"; review-article for Bullán. An Irish Studies Journal, vol. 2 no. 1 (Summer 1995), pp. 101–108.
- "'A Lesson for the People': Reflections on Image and Habitus in Medieval Insular Iconography", in: RIdIM/RCMI Newsletter, vol. 20 no. 1 (Spring 1995), pp. 3–9.
- "Music-Related Imagery on Early Christian Insular Sculpture: Identification, Context, Function", in: Imago Musicae/International Yearbook of Musical Iconography, vol. 8 (1991), pp. 135–199 [published in 1995].
- "Perspectives on Self-Critical Research Methods", in: Anuarul Institutului de Istorie Cluj-Napoca (Journal of the Institute of History, Academia Română, Filială din Cluj-Napoca [Romanian Academy of Sciences, Cluj Branch]), vol. 24 (1995), pp. 395–399.
- "Dans şi transiţie în Transilvania rurală" [Dance and transition in rural Transylvania], in: Dilema, vol. 4, no. 234 (18–24 July 1997), p. 16.
- "Music and Manners: Readings of Medieval Irish Literature", in: Bullán. An Irish Studies Journal, vol. 3 no. 1 (Spring 1997), pp. 33–43.
- "Music Iconography and the Semiotics of Visual Representation", in: Music in Art. International Journal for Music Iconography, vol. 1 (1998) no. 1–2, pp. 7–12.
- "Music and Musicians in Medieval Irish Society", in: Early Music, vol. 28 no. 2 (May 2000), pp. 165–190.
- "In Search of Music of the Medieval Irish Church", in: New Liturgy, no. 125 (Spring 2005), pp. 9–15.
- "Urraim do na Naoimh Éireannacha sa Liotúirge san Eoraip sna Meánaoiseanna" [The Liturgical Veneration of Irish Saints in Medieval Europe], in: Bliainiris, vol. 6 (2006), pp. 57–71.
- "Musical Monuments from Medieval Meath", in: Ríocht na Midhe, vol. 19 (2008), pp. 23–42.
- "'Peregrini pro Christo': The Irish Church in Medieval Europe as Reflected in Liturgical Sources for the Veneration of its Missionary Saints", in: De Musica Disserenda, vol. 14 (2008) no. 1, pp. 93–105.

=== Encyclopaedia and dictionary articles ===
- "Music in Medieval Ireland", in: The Companion to Irish Traditional Music, ed. Fintan Vallely (Cork: Cork University Press, 1999).
- "Iconography", in: The New Oxford Companion to Music, ed. Alison Latham (New York, 2000).
- "Timpan/Tiompán", in: The New Grove Dictionary of Music and Musicians and The New Grove Dictionary of Musical Instruments (London: Macmillan, 1980 and 1986, respectively); revised for new 2001 edition: vol. 25.
- "Celtic Chant", in: The New Grove Dictionary of Music and Musicians, ed. Stanley Sadie (London: Macmillan 2001).
- "Altramar"; "Bangor, Antiphonary of"; "Cistercians" [with Frank Lawrence]; "Colm Cille/Columba, St"; "Columbanus, St"; "Comgall/Comgillus, St"; "Dublin Troper"; "Franciscans"; "High crosses"; "Iconography" [with Barra Boydell]; "Irish Liber hymnorum"; "Irish saints, liturgical veneration of" [with Sara G. Casey]; "Manuscripts, medieval"; "Medieval Ireland, music in"; "Medieval Ireland, Musical instruments in"; "Moengal/Marcellus"; "Ó Cerbaill, Maelruanaid"; "Secundinus (Sechnall), St"; "Sequence and prose"; "Ua Brolcháin, Máel-Ísu"; in: The Encyclopaedia of Music in Ireland, ed. Harry White and Barra Boydell (Dublin: University College Dublin Press, 2013).
- "Columba", "Columbanus", "Sechnall/Secundinus", in: The Canterbury Dictionary of Hymnology, ed. Jeremy Dibble and Emma Hornby (Canterbury: Canterbury Press, 2013).
- "Music of the Celtic Rite", in: The Orthodox Encyclopedia, ed. Sergey Nikitin (Moscow, 2014).
