= Éamonn Ó Gallchobhair =

Irish composer

- Born: 30 September 1900
- Died: 27 December 1982 (aged 82)
- Genres: Film score
- Occupation: Composer

Éamonn Ó Gallchobhair (30 September 1900 – 27 December 1982) was an Irish composer, and a major representative of the conservative side in Irish art music.

== Life ==
Ó Gallchobhair (anglicised "O'Gallagher") was born in Dundalk, County Louth, and studied music in Dublin at the Leinster School of Music and the Royal Irish Academy of Music (1927–1935).

During 1948–1949 Ó Gallchobhair briefly conducted the Radio Éireann Light Orchestra (today the RTÉ Concert Orchestra). In 1962, he succeeded Seán Ó Riada as conductor of the Abbey Theatre ensemble until it was dissolved after a few years. During this time, he is said to have lived on Pembroke Road.

Ó Gallchobhair was a composition teacher for students including John Kinsella.

In old age he lived with his wife for parts of the year in Spain and Italy. He died in Alicante (Spain).

== Music ==
Ó Gallchobhair was a prolific composer and arranger of Irish traditional music for a wide range of instrumentations. He played in a number of orchestras and chamber ensembles for which he frequently wrote or arranged music. Many of these were very popular during his lifetime and were frequently performed or broadcast.

Between 1935 and 1942 he wrote eleven "Dance Dramas", ballets on folklore themes, with one of the latter commissioned by Joan Denise Moriarty. This included the 2,5 hour production Catháir Linn (1942). He also wrote five light operas, or operettas, on Irish (Gaelic) texts, between 1944 and 1963, including Nocturne sa chearnóg (1942), Trágadh na Taoide (1950), Íoc-shláinte an ghrá (1954) and An mhaighdean mhara (1960). Later he gained some fame through Hollywood film scores, including John Ford's The Rising of the Moon.

Ó Gallchobhair was a major representative of the conservative side in Irish twentieth-century art music. He consciously eschewed contemporary styles and techniques of composition and argued repeatedly that Irish art music should be based on traditional music. With this position he stood in stark contrast to contemporary Irish composers such as Aloys Fleischmann, Frederick May, or Brian Boydell.
