= Donn Shléibhe Mac Cerbaill =

Donn Shléibhe Mac Cerbaill, Irish musician, died 1357.

The Annals of Connacht sub anno 1357 mention the death of Donn Shléibhe Mac Cerbaill, an accomplished musician.

Mac Cerbaill or Mac Cearbhaill, anglicised as MacCarroll and MacCarvill, was the name of two unrelated clans, one located in south Leinster in the region of County Carlow and County Kilkenny; a second family of the name, noted for its musicians, was located in County Antrim.

It is a distinct surname from Ó Cearbhaill.
