= Michael Carvill =

Northern Irish footballer

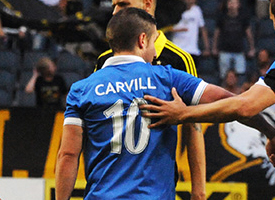

Personal information
- Full name: Michael Desmond Carvill
- Date of birth: 3 April 1988 (age 38)
- Place of birth: Belfast, Northern Ireland
- Height: 5 ft 10 in (1.78 m)
- Positions: Striker; winger

Team information
- Current team: Kilmore Rec

Senior career*
Years	Team	Apps	(Gls)
2007–2008	Wrexham	14	(0)
2008–2015	Linfield	176	(39)
2015–2019	Crusaders	91	(7)
2019	→ Dungannon Swifts (loan)	7	(1)
2019–2021	Dungannon Swifts	67	(8)
2021-	Kilmore Rec		

International career
2007–2008	Northern Ireland U21	7	(0)

Managerial career
- 2021–: Kilmore Rec
- * Club domestic league appearances and goals as of 20:36, 25 June 2021 (UTC)

Michael Desmond Carvill (born 3 April 1988 in Belfast) is a Northern Irish footballer who is player-manager of Kilmore Rec.

== Career ==
=== Early career ===
Carvill came through the youth ranks at Charlton Athletic but was released by the club in January 2007 without making a first-team appearance.

=== Wrexham ===
After his release from Charlton, Carvill joined Welsh club Wrexham and made 14 appearances in the Football League in the 2006–07 and 2007–08 seasons. He was released by Wrexham in May 2008 following the club's relegation to the Football Conference,

=== Linfield ===
He joined Irish Premiership club Linfield in August 2008. He signed a new two-year contract in March 2009 with Linfield manager, David Jeffrey, saying of him, "In addition to his enthusiasm and energy he has great technical ability and his skill levels are excellent." He went on to make over 200 appearances for the club in his seven years there.

=== Crusaders ===
On Sunday 14 June 2015, Carvill signed for Crusaders after turning down a new contract at Linfield due to lack of first team football. On 7 July 2015, he scored his first goal for the club, a vital away goal in the 1st qualifying round second leg match of the UEFA Champions League against Levadia Tallinn, which saw his side to a 1–1 draw and progression to the next round, having drawn the 1st leg 0–0 at Seaview.

On 30 January 2019, Carvill was loaned out to Dungannon Swifts until the end of the season.

Honours

With Linfield Michael won the IFA Premiership in 2009/10, 2010/11, 2011/12, the Irish Cup in 2010/11, 2011/12 and County Antrim Shield in 2013/14.

On Friday 10 July 2020, Michael won the weekly IFA Volunteers Quiz.
