= List of Irish people =

Location of Ireland

This is a list of notable Irish people, who were born on the island of Ireland, in either the Republic of Ireland or Northern Ireland, and have lived there for most of their lives. Also included on the list are people who were not born in Ireland, but have been raised as Irish, have lived there for most of their lives or in regards to the Republic of Ireland, have adopted Irish citizenship (e.g., Daniel Day-Lewis). The names are sorted by surname.

== Arts ==
=== Architecture ===
- George Ashlin
- Angela Brady
- George Drumgoole Coleman
- Sir Thomas Drew
- Yvonne Farrell
- Eileen Gray
- James Hoban – designer of the White House
- Francis Johnston
- Sheila O'Donnell
- Thomas Parke
- Edward Lovett Pearce
- Kevin Roche
- Michael Scott

=== Actors ===
- Sara Allgood – actress
- Jonas Armstrong – actor, star of the BBC series Robin Hood
- Caitríona Balfe – actress
- Spranger Barry – actor
- Patrick Bergin – film actor
- Sarah Bolger – actress, played Princess Mary Tudor in The Tudors; Spiderwick Chronicles; Princess Aurora in Once Upon a Time
- Stephen Boyd – film actor
- Kenneth Branagh – actor on stage, film and TV, Harry Potter films
- Brid Brennan – actress
- George Brent – Hollywood actor
- Harry Brogan – actor
- Shane Brolly – actor, Underworld
- Pierce Brosnan – actor, best known as James Bond from 1994 to 2005
- Gabriel Byrne – TV and film actor
- Todd Carty – TV, stage and film actor and director
- Elaine Cassidy – film actress
- Tony Clarkin – actor of stage, TV, radio, film; voiceover artist
- Michael Colgan – actor
- Kerry Condon – actress
- D'Arcy Corrigan – Hollywood actor
- Nicola Coughlan – actress
- Catherine Cusack – stage and TV actor; daughter of Cyril Cusack
- Cyril Cusack – actor of stage, film and TV (born in South Africa)
- Niamh Cusack – TV actress; daughter of Cyril Cusack
- Sinéad Cusack – stage, film and TV actress; daughter of Cyril Cusack; married to Jeremy Irons
- Sorcha Cusack – film and TV actress; daughter of Cyril Cusack
- Daniel Day-Lewis – English-born Oscar winner
- Thomas Doggett – actor
- Alison Doody – actress, best known for her role in Indiana Jones and the Last Crusade
- Richard Dormer – actor, playwright, known for roles in Game of Thrones and Fortitude
- Jamie Dornan – actor and model; played the Huntsman in Once Upon a Time; best known for roles in The Fall and Fifty Shades of Grey
- Roma Downey – actor, best known for her role as Monica in the TV series Touched by an Angel
- Maria Doyle Kennedy – actress and singer
- Moe Dunford - actor
- Ada Dyas – actress
- Hilton Edwards – co-founder of the Gate Theatre, born in UK
- Colin Farrell – Hollywood actor
- Michael Fassbender – Hollywood actor, born in West Germany
- Al Ferguson – actor
- Barry Fitzgerald – Abbey Theatre actor turned Hollywood star
- Geraldine Fitzgerald – actress
- Fionnula Flanagan – actress
- Brenda Fricker – Oscar winner
- Bronagh Gallagher – actress
- Michael Gambon – theatre, TV and film actor, Harry Potter films
- Charles K. Gerrard – Hollywood actor
- Douglas Gerrard – Hollywood actor
- Aidan Gillen – actor, The Wire, Game of Thrones, Queer as Folk
- Brendan Gleeson – actor, Oscar nominated
- Brian Gleeson – actor
- Domhnall Gleeson – actor
- Creighton Hale – actor
- Louisa Harland – actress
- Richard Harris – actor, Oscar nominated for The Field
- Forrester Harvey – Hollywood actor
- Amy Joyce Hastings – actress
- Amy Huberman – actress
- Saoirse-Monica Jackson – actress
- Valene Kane – actress, The Fading Light
- David Kelly – actor
- Barry Keoghan – actor
- J. M. Kerrigan – Abbey actor
- Joanne King – actress
- Dervla Kirwan – actress, Ballykissangel, Goodnight Sweetheart
- Evanna Lynch – actress, Harry Potter films
- Joe Lynch – TV actor
- John Lynch – actor
- Susan Lynch – actress
- Micheál Mac Liammhóir – co-founder of the Gate Theatre, born in UK
- Eoin Macken – actor, Merlin
- Gerard McCarthy – actor, Hollyoaks
- Sean McClory – actor
- F. J. McCormick – Abbey actor
- Damian McGinty – TV actor Glee
- Patrick McGoohan – actor and creator of The Prisoner
- Barry McGovern – stage, film and TV actor
- Katie McGrath – film and TV actress
- Gerard McSorley – actor
- Colm Meaney – Hollywood actor
- Paul Mescal – actor
- Jonathan Rhys Meyers – film and TV actor
- Charles Mitchel – actor and newsreader
- Damien Molony – stage and television actor
- Colin Morgan – actor of stage, film and TV, best known for being the lead in Merlin
- Edward Mulhare – actor; played Captain Daniel Gregg in The Ghost and Mrs. Muir; Knight Rider
- Cillian Murphy – actor
- Devon Murray – actor, Seamus Finnigan in the Harry Potter films
- Liam Neeson – actor
- Sam Neill – actor
- James Nesbitt – actor
- Jim Norton – character actor
- Jamie-Lee O'Donnell – actress
- Colin O'Donoghue – actor, member of The Enemies; best known for playing Captain Hook in Once Upon A Time
- Chris O'Dowd – actor and comedian
- Ardal O'Hanlon – actor and comedian
- Joan O'Hara – actress
- Maureen O'Hara – actress
- Jason O'Mara – actor
- Milo O'Shea – actor
- Maureen O'Sullivan – actor; mother of Mia Farrow
- Peter O'Toole – Oscar winner
- Daragh O'Malley – actor
- Glenn Quinn – actor
- Aidan Quinn – actor
- Stephen Rea – actor
- Jack Reynor – actor
- Paul Ronan – actor, The Devil's Own; father of Saoirse Ronan
- Saoirse Ronan – actress
- Andrew Scott – film, stage and television actor
- Fiona Shaw – actress, Harry Potter films
- Robert Sheehan – actor
- Arthur Shields – actor; younger brother of Barry Fitzgerald
- Niall Tóibín – actor and comedian
- Harry Towb – actor
- Stuart Townsend – actor and boxer
- Aidan Turner – actor, played John Mitchell in the BBC's Being Human and Kili in The Hobbit: An Unexpected Journey
- Richard Wall – actor

=== Chefs ===
- Darina Allen – TV personality and chef
- Myrtle Allen – chef, teacher and writer
- Rachel Allen – celebrity chef
- Danni Barry
- Michael Bolster
- Rory Carville
- Richard Corrigan
- Matthew Darcy
- Matt Dowling
- Kevin Dundon
- Oliver Dunne
- Catherine Healy
- Neven Maguire – celebrity chef
- Clare Smyth

=== Comedians ===
- Dave Allen
- Aisling Bea
- Ed Byrne
- Jimmy Carr
- Risteárd Cooper
- Neil Delamere
- P. J. Gallagher
- Brendan Grace
- Sean Hughes
- Jon Kenny
- Denis Leary
- Andrew Maxwell
- Kevin McGahern
- Tim McGarry
- Seán William McLoughlin – YouTube personality (under the name Jacksepticeye), musician, game commentator
- Dylan Moran
- Dermot Morgan – comedian, actor, radio personality
- Colin Murphy
- Graham Norton
- Dara Ó Briain
- Brendan O'Carroll
- Jimmy O'Dea
- David O'Doherty
- Ardal O'Hanlon
- Hector Ó hEochagáin
- Deirdre O'Kane
- Jarlath Regan – comedian, journalist, interviewer, author, cartoonist
- Mario Rosenstock – comedian, impressionist, actor, musician
- Pat Shortt
- Tommy Tiernan
- Jackie Wright

=== Music ===
==== Music – A to C ====
- Chloë Agnew – singer
- Iain Archer – singer-songwriter and producer
- Bobbi Arlo – singer
- Michael William Balfe – opera composer
- Gerald Barry – composer, member of Aosdána
- John K. Beatty – uilleann piper
- Derek Bell – harpist
- Eric Bell – guitarist, Thin Lizzy
- Ed Bennett – composer
- Mary Bergin – tin whistler
- Big Tom – lead singer of Big Tom and The Mainliners
- Wallis Bird – singer-songwriter
- Frances Black – singer
- Mary Black – singer
- Seóirse Bodley – composer, Saoi of Aosdána
- Bono (Paul David Hewson) – lead singer of U2
- Ciarán Bourke – singer, guitarist
- Brian Boydell – composer
- Ina Boyle – composer
- Michael Bradley – bass player, songwriter, The Undertones
- Brídín Brennan – singer
- Enya Brennan – musician
- Moya Brennan – musician
- Niall Breslin – lead singer of The Blizzards
- John Buckley – composer
- Chris de Burgh – singer-songwriter, musician
- Joe Burke – accordionist
- Kevin Burke – fiddler
- Nicky Byrne – singer of Westlife, songwriter
- Eamonn Campbell – guitarist, producer
- Vivian Campbell – co-lead guitarist of Def Leppard, Dio
- Seán Cannon – singer, guitarist
- Paddy Casey – singer-songwriter
- Patrick Cassidy – composer
- Mic Christopher – singer-songwriter
- Bobby Clancy – singer, banjo, guitar, harmonica, and bodhrán player
- Liam Clancy – singer, guitarist
- Paddy Clancy – singer, harmonica player
- Tom Clancy – singer
- Willie Clancy – uilleann piper
- Siobhán Cleary (born 1970) – composer
- Julia Clifford – traditional fiddle player
- Erica Cody – singer
- Philip Cogan – composer
- Michael Coleman – fiddler
- Finghin Collins – pianist
- Brian Conway – fiddler
- Tadhg Cooke – singer
- Frank Corcoran – composer
- Andrea Corr – singer from The Corrs
- Caroline Corr – drummer
- Jim Corr – guitarist
- Sharon Corr – fiddle player
- Phil Coulter – composer
- Nadine Coyle – singer

==== Music – D to K ====
- Raymond Deane – composer
- Damien Dempsey – singer-songwriter
- Mike Denver – singer
- Joe Dolan – singer, entertainer
- Ryan Dolan – singer-songwriter
- Brian Downey – drummer, Thin Lizzy
- Roger Doyle – composer
- Maria Doyle Kennedy – singer-songwriter, musician
- Ronnie Drew – singer, guitarist
- Keith Duffy – singer of Boyzone
- Hugo Duncan – singer
- Benjamin Dwyer – composer
- The Edge (David Howell Evans) – guitarist, singer of U2
- Kian Egan – singer of Westlife, songwriter
- Séamus Ennis – uilleann piper
- Enya – singer-songwriter
- Órla Fallon – singer, harpist
- Ciarán Farrell – composer
- Mark Feehily – singer of Westlife, songwriter
- Angela Feeney – opera singer
- John Field – composer; creator of the nocturne
- Shane Filan – singer of Westlife, songwriter
- Mick Flannery – singer-songwriter
- Aloys Fleischmann – composer and musicologist
- W. H. Grattan Flood – musicologist
- Dave Flynn – award-winning composer, guitarist and singer-songwriter
- Gavin Friday – singer
- Finbar Furey – singer-songwriter, uilleann piper, 5-string banjo player, actor
- Rory Gallagher – blues/rock guitarist
- Sir James Galway – flautist
- Bobby Gardiner – accordionist
- Rea Garvey – singer-songwriter, guitarist, TV music competition judge and lead singer of Reamonn
- Stephen Gately – singer of Boyzone
- Mark Geary – singer
- Thomas Augustine Geary – composer
- Bob Geldof – songwriter, singer of the Boomtown Rats, activist
- John William Glover – composer
- Len Graham – singer
- Michael Graham – singer of Boyzone
- Bernadette Greevy – mezzo-soprano
- John and Edward Grimes – X Factor 2009
- Marc Gunn – autoharpist, singer-songwriter, and podcaster, formerly of the Brobdingnagian Bards
- Carmel Gunning – tin whistler
- Lisa Hannigan – singer-songwriter
- Glen Hansard – Oscar-winning singer/songwriter
- Hamilton Harty – composer and arranger
- Catherine Hayes – opera singer
- Gemma Hayes – singer
- Una Healy – member of girl band The Saturdays
- Christie Hennessy – singer-songwriter
- Niall Horan – singer-songwriter, member of British-Irish boy band One Direction
- Hozier – musician and singer-songwriter
- Herbert Hughes – composer and arranger
- Red Hurley – singer
- Brian Irvine – composer
- Jolyon Jackson – composer musician
- Fergus Johnston – composer, member of Aosdána
- Dolores Keane – singer
- Bryan Kearney – trance DJ and producer
- Ronan Keating – singer-songwriter
- Paddy Keenan – uilleann piper
- Lisa Kelly – singer
- Luke Kelly – singer
- Michael Kelly – tenor and composer
- Brian Kennedy – singer
- Dermot Kennedy – singer-songwriter
- Paddy Killoran – fiddler
- Katie Kim – singer-songwriter, musician
- Dave King – singer-songwriter
- John Kinsella – composer, member of Aosdána
- David Kitt – musician

==== Music – L to P ====
- John F. Larchet – composer
- April Lawlor – singer-songwriter
- Damien Leith – singer-songwriter, winner of Australian Idol 2006
- Gary Lightbody – lead singer of Snow Patrol
- Josef Locke – singer
- Johnny Logan – singer-songwriter
- Samuel Lover – composer and performer
- Cora Venus Lunny – violinist
- Dónal Lunny – musician
- Bob Lynch – folk musician
- Shane Lynch – singer of Boyzone
- Phil Lynott – Thin Lizzy frontman
- Jimmy MacCarthy – singer-songwriter
- Mickey MacConnell – singer-songwriter
- Shane MacGowan – English-born singer-songwriter
- Sean Mackin – backup vocals and violinist of Yellowcard
- Sean Maguire – violinist
- Sarah Makem – singer
- Tommy Makem – singer-songwriter
- Margo – singer
- Enda Markey – singer
- Philip Martin – pianist, composer, member of Aosdána
- Gwendolyn Masin – violinist, author, pedagogue
- Larry Mathews – singer-songwriter, violinist
- Frederick May – composer
- Christopher McCafferty – underground club promoter, DJ
- Jim McCann (musician) – musician
- John Count McCormack – singer
- Eleanor McEvoy – singer-songwriter
- Brian McFadden – singer-songwriter
- Damian McGinty – Celtic Thunder; played Rory Flanagan on Glee
- Matt McGinn – singer-songwriter
- Michael McGlynn – composer, arranger, choir director
- Geraldine McGowan – folk singer
- Barney McKenna – banjo player
- Susan McKeown – Grammy Award-winning vocalist and songwriter
- Geraldine McMahon – harpist
- Paul McSherry – guitarist
- James Lynam Molloy – ballad composer
- Christy Moore – singer-songwriter
- Gary Moore – guitarist, singer-songwriter
- Peter K. Moran – composer
- Van Morrison – singer-songwriter
- Lee Mulhern – singer-songwriter
- Gráinne Mulvey – composer
- Samantha Mumba – singer, actress
- Mundy – singer-songwriter
- John Murphy – fiddle player
- Róisín Murphy – singer
- Ruby Murray – singer
- Máiréad Nesbitt – fiddler
- Méav Ní Mhaolchatha – singer
- Mairéad Ní Mhaonaigh – musician
- Eithne Ní Uallacháin – singer
- Pádraigín Ní Uallacháin – singer
- John O’Callaghan – musician
- Fintan O'Carroll - composer
- Turlough O'Carolan – 17th/18th-century harper and composer
- Colm Ó Cíosóig – musician, drummer of My Bloody Valentine
- Maura O'Connell – singer
- Máirtín O'Connor – accordionist
- Sinéad O'Connor – singer
- Daniel O'Donnell – country-and-western singer
- Danny O'Donoghue – lead singer of The Script
- Robert O'Dwyer – composer
- Liam O'Flynn – uilleann piper
- Kane O'Hara – composer
- Mary O'Hara – harpist/singer
- Mícheál Ó hEidhin – musician
- Arthur O'Leary – composer
- Jane O'Leary – composer and pianist
- Damian O'Neill – lead guitarist of The Undertones
- John O'Neill – guitarist of The Undertones; writer of Teenage Kicks
- Seán Ó Riada – composer and musician
- Annmarie O'Riordan – singer-songwriter
- Dolores O'Riordan – singer-songwriter, guitarist
- George Alexander Osborne – composer
- Gilbert O'Sullivan – pop singer-songwriter, pianist
- Una Palliser – violinist, violist, singer
- Geoffrey Molyneux Palmer – composer
- Luan Parle – singer-songwriter, musician
- Tommy Peoples – fiddler
- Brendan Phelan – songwriter
- A. J. Potter – composer

==== Music – Q to Z ====
- Carmel Quinn – singer
- Paddy Reilly – singer/guitarist
- Damien Rice – singer-songwriter
- Thomas Roseingrave – composer
- Leo Rowsome – uilleann piper
- Derek Ryan – singer
- Frank Ryan – tenor
- Dana Rosemary Scallon – MEP-singer turned politician
- Sharon Shannon – traditional musician
- Feargal Sharkey – lead singer of The Undertones
- John Sheahan – fiddler
- Mark Sheehan – guitarist of The Script
- Kevin Shields – musician, vocalist and guitarist of My Bloody Valentine
- Chris Singleton – singer-songwriter
- Donal Skehan – singer
- Carly Smithson – singer
- Charles Villiers Stanford – composer
- Robert Prescott Stewart – composer and organist
- Bambie Thug – singer
- Patsy Touhey – piper
- Joan Trimble – composer and pianist
- Paddy Tunney – singer
- VerseChorusVerse – musician and singer-songwriter, pseudonym of Tony Wright
- Gerard Victory – composer
- Kevin Volans – composer
- William Vincent Wallace – composer
- Jennifer Walshe – composer and performer
- Patsy Watchorn – musician
- Liam Weldon – singer-songwriter
- Bill Whelan – composer
- Andy White – singer-songwriter
- Colm Wilkinson – singer
- Ian Wilson – composer
- James Wilson – composer
- Charles Wood – composer
- Terry Woods – musician
- Richard Woodward – composer and organist
- Finbar Wright – singer-songwriter

=== Dance ===
- Breandán de Gallaí – Irish dancer
- Joanne Doyle – Irish dancer
- Monica Loughman – ballet
- Tristan MacManus – ballroom and Latin dancer, Dancing with the Stars, US season 13
- Lola Montez (Eliza Gilbert) – dancer, courtesan
- Dame Ninette de Valois – ballet
- Bill Whelan – composer

=== Visual arts ===
- Gerald Davis – painter
- Hilary Heron – sculptor
- Seán Keating – painter
- Harry Kernoff – painter and woodcut artist
- Graham Knuttel – painter and sculptor
- Eva Rothschild – sculptor
- Estella Solomons – landscape and portrait painter
- Amelia Stein – photographer
- Stella Steyn – painter and illustrator
- Launt Thompson – American sculptor from Abbeyleix, County Laois
- Jack B. Yeats – painter

=== Writing ===
==== Writing – A to C ====
- Cecelia Ahern – novelist
- William Allingham – poet
- John Banville – novelist
- George Barrington – pickpocket, writer and transportee
- Sebastian Barry – novelist
- Samuel Beckett – novelist, playwright, theatre director, poet, author of Waiting for Godot and Nobel laureate
- Brendan Behan – playwright, novelist
- Maeve Binchy – novelist
- Dermot Bolger – novelist
- Patrick Brontë – poet
- Stephen Brown – writer, bibliographer
- J. B. Bury – historian
- William Carleton – novelist
- Austin Clarke – poet
- Josephine Fitzgerald Clarke – author
- Brian Cleeve – author
- Brian Coffey – poet
- Eoin Colfer – author
- Laura Angela Collins – author
- Frederick William Conway – editor and journalist
- Eoghan Corry – journalist and author
- Sister Margaret Anna Cusack – the "Nun of Kenmare", patriot and controversialist

==== Writing – D to K ====
- Thomas Osborne Davis – writer, poet
- Seamus Deane – writer, member of Aosdána
- Patrick Deeley – poet
- Eamon Delaney – diplomat and writer
- Frank Delaney – writer and broadcaster
- Greg Delanty – poet
- Denis Devlin – poet
- Roddy Doyle – novelist
- Margaretta Eagar – memoirist
- Garth Ennis – comic writer
- Sir Samuel Ferguson – poet
- Roderick Flanagan – historian
- Philip Flattisbury – compiler
- Brian Friel – playwright, member of Aosdána
- Oliver St. John Gogarty – poet
- Oliver Goldsmith – novelist and dramatist
- Augusta, Lady Gregory – playwright and founder of the Abbey Theatre
- Hugo Hamilton – author
- Dermot Healy – writer, member of Aosdána
- Randolph Healy – poet
- Seamus Heaney – poet, Saoi of Aosdána, Nobel laureate
- Aidan Higgins – fiction writer, member of Aosdána
- Anthony Holten – author
- Pat Ingoldsby – poet, playwright, television performer
- Jennifer Johnston – novelist, member of Aosdána
- Neil Jordan – author, film director, Aosdána
- James Joyce – novelist, author of Ulysses
- Trevor Joyce – poet
- Herminie Templeton Kavanagh – author
- Patrick Kavanagh – poet
- John B. Keane – playwright, novelist and essayist
- Benedict Kiely – writer, Saoi of Aosdána
- Caitlín R. Kiernan – American novelist and paleontologist
- Anatoly Kudryavitsky – poet

==== Writing – L to P ====
- Derek Landy – author, Skulduggery Pleasant series
- Mary Lavin – fiction writer, Saoi of Aosdána (born in the United States)
- Joseph Sheridan Le Fanu – gothic novelist
- Francis Ledwidge – poet
- C. S. Lewis – author of the Chronicles of Narnia
- Michael Longley – poet, member of Aosdána
- Seosamh Mac Grianna – Gaelic author
- Oliver MacDonagh – historian
- Walter Macken – novelist
- James Clarence Mangan – poet
- Malachi Martin – horror writer
- Edward Martyn – playwright, art patron and political activist
- Frank McCourt – writer
- Martin McDonagh – playwright
- Hugh McFadden – poet and critic
- John McGahern – novelist, member of Aosdána
- Lisa McGee – playwright, screenwriter, creator of Derry Girls
- Frank McGuinness – playwright, member of Aosdána
- Paula Meehan – poet
- John Montague – poet
- Thomas Moore – poet
- Paul Muldoon – poet
- Dervla Murphy - travel writer
- Richard Murphy – poet, member of Aosdána
- Nuala Ni Dhomhnaill – poet
- Christopher Nolan – poet, member of Aosdána
- Edna O'Brien – novelist, member of Aosdána
- Seán O'Casey – playwright
- Frank O'Connor – short story writer
- Ulick O'Connor – writer, member of Aosdána
- Máirtín Ó Direáin – Irish-language poet, member of Aosdána
- Peadar O'Donnell – novelist, autobiographer and revolutionary
- Harry O'Donovan – scriptwriter
- Dennis O'Driscoll – poet
- Seán Ó Faoláin – writer, Saoi of Aosdána
- Liam O'Flaherty – novelist, short story writer
- Finghin O Mathghamhna – medieval translator and scribe
- Brian O'Nolan (aka Myles na gCopaleen – Flann O'Brien) – novelist, columnist
- Philip O'Sullivan Beare – writer, historian
- James Plunkett – fiction writer, member of Aosdána
- Katherine Purdon – fiction writer

==== Writing – R to Z ====
- Sally Rooney – novelist, screenwriter
- Gabriel Rosenstock – poet
- George William Russell – writer and critic
- Michael Scott – novelist, screenwriter, folklorist, author of The Secrets of the Immortal Nicholas Flamel
- Maurice Scully – poet
- Darren Shan – novelist, author of The Saga of Darren Shan
- George Bernard Shaw – novelist, playwright, author of Pygmalion and Nobel laureate
- John D. Sheridan – short story writer and humorist
- Richard Brinsley Sheridan – playwright
- James Simmons – poet
- Michael Smith – poet
- Paul Smith – novelist, playwright
- Annie M. P. Smithson – novelist
- Geoffrey Squires – poet
- Laurence Sterne – novelist, author of Tristram Shandy
- Bram Stoker – author of Dracula
- Francis Stuart – writer, Saoi of Aosdána (born in Australia)
- Jonathan Swift – Dean of St Patrick's Cathedral, Dublin, novelist and satirist, author of Gulliver's Travels
- John Millington Synge – dramatist
- Joan Tighe – fashion journalist, editor and local historian
- William Trevor – fiction writer, member of Aosdána
- William Wall – novelist, poet
- Oscar Wilde – novelist, poet, satirist, author of The Picture of Dorian Gray
- Macdara Woods – poet
- Maev-Ann Wren – writer
- William Butler Yeats – poet, playwright and Nobel laureate

== Business ==
- Donie Cassidy – businessman and TD
- Elaine Coughlan – venture capitalist
- Bill Cullen – businessman, philanthropist and media personality
- Niall FitzGerald – honorary KBE, chief executive of Unilever
- James Gamble – co-founder of Procter & Gamble
- Arthur Guinness – brewer
- Adam Harris – founder of AsIAm
- Sarah Keane – CEO of Swim Ireland and President of the Olympic Federation of Ireland
- Pat McDonagh – founder of Supermac's
- J. P. McManus – businessman
- Margaret Molloy – businesswoman
- Denis O'Brien – businessman
- Michael O'Leary – CEO of Ryanair
- Tony O'Reilly – Independent News & Media and head of Heinz, 1979–1996
- David J. O'Reilly – CEO of Chevron
- Tony Ryan – founder of Ryanair and Guinness Peat Aviation
- Peter Sutherland – Chairman of BP; Chairman of Goldman Sachs International; Ireland's representative at the European Commission

== Science, education and technology ==
- Leonard Abrahamson (1896–1961) – cardiologist, introduced the cardiograph to Dublin, president of the Royal College of Physicians of Ireland (1949–1952)
- Robert Adrain (1775–1843) – scientist, mathematician and United Irishman
- Thomas Andrews (1813–1885) – chemist and physicist
- Francis Beaufort (1774–1857) – hydrographer, developed a scale for classifying wind strength
- John Stewart Bell (1928–1990) – atomic physicist, 'Bell's Inequalities'
- John Desmond Bernal (1901–1971) – X-ray crystallography
- George Boole (1815–1864) – mathematician (Boolean algebra, digital logic)
- Robert Boyle (1627–1691) – physicist, 'Boyle's law'
- Louis Brennan (1852–1932) – principle of a guided missile, wire-guided torpedo
- Pádraig de Brún (1889–1960) – scholar and mathematician
- Lucien Bull (1876–1972) – high-speed photography, modern electrocardiogram (ECG)
- Jocelyn Bell Burnell (born 1943) – discovered pulsars
- Nicholas Callan (1799–1864) – inventor of the induction coil and discoverer the principle of the dynamo
- Aeneas Coffey (1780–1852) – heat exchanger, inventor of the column still
- William Monad Crawford – entomologist
- William Dargan (1799–1867) – railway engineer
- David Doak (born 1967) – scientist, video game developer and entrepreneur
- Frederick G. Donnan – chemist
- Niall J. English (born 1979) – inventor, industrialist, researcher and chartered chemical engineer
- Michael Everson – expert in writing systems and Unicode, born in the U.S.
- Wentworth Erck – astronomer, poor-law guardian and magistrate
- Harry Ferguson – engineer, designer of the modern farm tractor, inventor of the three-point hitch
- George FitzGerald (1851–1901) – theoretical physicist, 'FitzGerald-Lorentz Contraction'
- Patrick Ganly (1809–1899) – geologist; described the use of cross-bedding in stratification
- John Robert Gregg (1868–1948) – Gregg shorthand system
- William Rowan Hamilton – mathematician, astronomer and mathematical physicist
- Áine Hardiman – nun, headteacher, anti-apartheid activist
- John Philip Holland (1841–1914) – submarine designer
- Ellen Hutchins (1785–1815) – botanist
- John Joly (1857–1933) – photometer, colour photography
- Sindy Joyce – education
- Richard Kirwan (1733–1812) – meteorologist
- Alice Lawrenson, (1841–1900) – botanical writer and gardener
- Kathleen Lonsdale (1903–1971) – crystallographer
- Christine E. Loscher – biotechnologist
- Percy Ludgate (1883–1922) – designer of the second Analytical Engine
- Lydia Lynch – immunologist
- Kathleen Lynn (1874–1955) – one of the first female medical doctors in Ireland, politician and activist
- Robert Mallet (1810–1881) – seismology
- Alexander Mitchell (1780–1868) – lighthouse and marine engineer
- Dervilla Mitchell – engineer
- Hannah Moylan (1867–1902) – first woman to get a degree in science in Ireland
- Robert Murphy (1806–1843) – mathematician and physicist
- Cliona O’Farrelly – immunologist, Trinity College
- Richard O'Keefe – computer scientist
- Frank Pantridge (1916–2004) – inventor of the mobile defibrillator
- Dorothy Price (1890–1954) – physician who introduced the BCG tuberculosis vaccine to Ireland
- Patricia Redlich (1940–2011) – clinical psychologist
- Sir George Stokes, 1st Baronet (1819–1903) – mathematician, physicist, 'Stokes Theorem' and Stokes-Navier equations'
- George Johnstone Stoney (1826–1911) – atomic physicist, named the electron and measured its charge
- John Lighton Synge (1897–1995) – mathematician
- William Thomson, Lord Kelvin (1824–1907) – physicist
- John Tyndall (1820–1893) – physicist
- Ernest Walton (1903–1995) – physicist, 1951 Nobel Prize in Physics
- Mary Ward (1827–1869) – microscopist
- Jacob Weingreen (1908–1995) – Erasmus Smith Professor of Hebrew at Trinity College Dublin (1937–78) and archaeologist
- John Richardson Wigham (1829–1906) – inventor and lighthouse engineer

== Sport ==
- Bundee Aki – rugby union player
- Francie Barrett – professional boxer
- George Best – soccer player (Northern Ireland)
- John Pius Boland – tennis player, double Olympic medallist, 1896
- Packie Bonner – soccer player
- Louis Bookman – soccer player and cricketer
- Andre Botha – cricketer
- Jeremy Bray – Australian-Irish cricketer
- Andrew Bree – swimmer
- Tommy Byrne – racing driver
- Kenny Carroll – cricketer
- Michael Carruth – Olympic gold medal winner, boxing
- Tony Cascarino – soccer player
- Eamonn Coghlan – runner
- Mark Cohen – cricketer
- Séamus Coleman – soccer player
- Enda Colleran – Gaelic footballer, member of the Football Team of the Millennium
- Ray Cummins – member of the hurling Team of the Millennium
- Liam Daish – soccer player
- Derek Daly – racing driver
- Gordon D'Arcy – rugby union player
- Paul Darragh – showjumper
- Ron Delany – 1500m runner, Olympic medallist
- Fergal Devitt (Finn Bálor) – WWE wrestler
- Ken Doherty – World Professional Billiards and Snooker Association champion
- John Doyle – member of the hurling Team of the Millennium
- Mick Doyle – rugby union player
- Damien Duff – soccer player
- Richard Dunne – soccer player
- Joey Dunlop – motorcycle racer, 26 times Isle of Man TT race winner
- Eamon Dunphy – soccer player, media commentator and broadcaster
- Kieran Dynes – NASCAR driver
- Shay Elliott – professional cyclist
- Jonny Evans – soccer player (Northern Ireland)
- Stephen Farrelly (Sheamus) – WWE wrestler
- Dave Finlay (Finlay) – WWE wrestler
- Ciaran Fitzgerald – rugby union player, British and Irish Lions captain
- Seán Flanagan – Gaelic footballer, member of the Football Team of the Millennium
- Sharon Foley – track and field athlete
- Carl Frampton – boxer
- Frankie Fullen – soccer player
- Mick Galwey – rugby player
- Ian Garry – mixed martial artist
- Enon Gavin – Gaelic footballer
- Edmond Gibney – equestrian
- Darron Gibson – soccer player
- Johnny Giles – soccer player
- Peter Gillespie – cricketer
- Shay Given – soccer player
- Pádraig Harrington – golfer and three time Golf Majors winner
- Elizabeth Hawkins-Whitshed – 19th-century mountaineer
- David Healy – soccer player (Northern Ireland)
- Jamie Heaslip – rugby union player
- Kevin Heffernan – Gaelic footballer, member of the Football Team of the Millennium
- Robert Heffernan – race walker and Olympic medalist
- Denis Hickie – rugby union player
- Alex Higgins – snooker player
- Ray Houghton – soccer player
- Denis Irwin – soccer player
- Louis Jacobson – cricketer
- Trent Johnston – Irish-Australian cricketer
- Eddie Jordan – racing driver and Formula 1 team owner
- John Keane – member of the hurling Team of the Millennium
- Robbie Keane – soccer player
- Roy Keane – soccer player
- Eddie Keher – member of the hurling Team of the Millennium
- Joe Kelly – racing driver
- Seán Kelly – road cyclist
- David Kennedy – racing driver
- Joe Keohane – Gaelic footballer, member of the Football Team of the Millennium
- Kevin Kilbane – soccer player
- Michael Kinane – jockey
- Ham Lambert – rugby union and cricket player
- Tommy Langan – Gaelic footballer, member of the Football Team of the Millennium
- Dave Langford-Smith – cricketer
- Jim Langton – member of the hurling Team of the Millennium
- Liam Lawrence – soccer player for Shrewsbury Town FC and Republic of Ireland international
- Alan Lewis – rugby union referee
- Becky Lynch – WWE wrestler
- Jack Lynch – member of the hurling Team of the Millennium, politician
- Eddie Macken – horse showjumper
- Mick Mackey – member of the hurling Team of the Millennium
- Owen Madden – soccer player
- Dan Marten – cyclist
- Dave McAuley – boxer
- Kevin McBride – boxer
- Willie John McBride – rugby union player, British and Irish Lions captain
- Kyle McCallan – cricketer
- David McCann – cyclist
- Mick McCarthy – soccer player and Republic of Ireland soccer manager
- Wayne McCullough – WBC World Boxing Champion, Olympic silver medalist
- Paul McGinley – golfer
- Owen Roe McGovern – Gaelic football player for Cavan and All-Ireland
- Paul McGrath – soccer player
- Conor McGregor – mixed martial artist
- Barry McGuigan – world featherweight boxing champion
- Rory McIlroy – golfer
- Catherina McKiernan – track and field athlete
- Jimmy McLarnin – boxer
- Lory Meagher – member of the hurling Team of the Millennium
- Greg Molins – cricketer
- Jason Molins – cricketer
- Lara Molins – cricketer
- John Mooney – cricketer
- Paul Mooney – cricketer
- Eoin Morgan – cricketer
- Geordan Murphy – rugby union player
- Seán Murphy – Gaelic footballer, member of the Football Team of the Millennium
- Tommy Murphy – Gaelic footballer, member of the Football Team of the Millennium
- Owen Nolan – Canadian hockey player
- Aiden O'Brien – soccer player
- Kevin O'Brien – cricketer
- Niall O'Brien – cricketer
- Vincent O'Brien – voted greatest horse trainer of all time by Racing Post
- Pat O'Callaghan – Olympic gold medal, hammer, 1928, 1932
- Martin O'Connell – Gaelic footballer, member of the Football Team of the Millennium
- Mick O'Connell – Gaelic footballer, member of the Football Team of the Millennium
- Patrick O'Connell – soccer player, Real Betis/FC Barcelona manager, 1930s
- Paul O'Connell – rugby union player, British and Irish Lions captain
- Cian O'Connor – show jumper, Olympic gold medal withdrawn
- Shane O'Connor – Alpine skier, Olympian 2010
- Christopher O'Donnell – track and field sprinter
- Nick O'Donnell – member of the hurling Team of the Millennium
- Brian O'Driscoll – rugby union player, British and Irish Lions captain
- Ronan O'Gara – rugby union player
- Dan O'Keeffe – Gaelic footballer, member of the Football Team of the Millennium
- Malcolm O'Kelly – rugby union player
- Jonjo O'Neill – jockey
- Seán O'Neill – Gaelic footballer, member of the Football Team of the Millennium
- Joan O'Reilly – international hockey player
- John Joe O'Reilly – Gaelic footballer, member of the Football Team of the Millennium
- Derval O'Rourke – World Indoor Champion and European silver medalist
- John O'Shea – soccer player
- Peter O'Sullevan – horse racing commentator
- Eddie O'Sullivan – rugby union coach
- Gillian O'Sullivan – World Championships silver medalist
- Sonia O'Sullivan – Olympic silver medalist
- Michael Phelan – billiards
- Paddy Phelan – member of the hurling Team of the Millennium
- William Porterfield – cricketer
- Seán Purcell – Gaelic footballer, member of the Football Team of the Millennium
- Niall Quinn – soccer player
- Bobby Rackard – member of the hurling Team of the Millennium
- Boyd Rankin – cricketer
- Jonathan Rea – motorcycle racer, six time Superbike World Champion
- Tony Reddin – member of the hurling Team of the Millennium
- Christy Ring – member of the hurling Team of the Millennium
- Nicolas Roche – cyclist
- Stephen Roche – road cyclist
- Michael Roe – racing driver
- Alain Rolland – rugby union player and referee
- Glenn Ross – Strongman
- Mark Scanlon – cyclist
- Johnny Sexton – rugby union player, 2018 World Rugby Player of the Year
- Tom Sharkey – boxer
- Mikey Sheehy – Gaelic footballer, member of the Football Team of the Millennium
- Andrew Slattery – rally car driver
- Michelle Smith – multi gold medalist 1996 Olympics
- Des Smyth – golfer
- Dr. Bethel Solomons – rugby union player, Ireland national team, Olympic team silver
- Pat Spillane – Gaelic footballer, member of the Football Team of the Millennium
- Steve Staunton – soccer player
- Jim Stynes – Australian rules football champion
- Katie Taylor – boxer, Irish, European, World and Olympic champion in the 60 kg division, Olympic Gold Medalist (2012)
- Bob Tisdall – 400m runner, Olympic gold medal 1932
- John Treacy – marathon runner, Olympic silver medal 1984
- Josh van der Flier – rugby union player, 2022 World Rugby Player of the Year
- Ruby Walsh – jockey
- Brian Whelahan – member of the hurling Team of the Millennium
- Glenn Whelan – soccer player
- Ronnie Whelan – soccer player
- Andrew White – cricketer
- Norman Whiteside – soccer player (Northern Ireland)
- Joe Wickham – soccer player, President of the Football Association of Ireland
- Keith Wood – rugby union player, 2001 World Rugby Player of the Year

== TV and radio ==
- Eamonn Andrews – television personality, producer and businessman
- Amanda Byram – broadcaster
- Gay Byrne – broadcaster, presenter of The Late Late Show (1962–1999)
- Matt Cooper – broadcaster and journalist
- Ray D'arcy – broadcaster
- Ian Dempsey – television presenter
- Anne Doyle – journalist and broadcaster
- Joe Duffy – radio broadcaster
- Maïa Dunphy – broadcaster, television producer and writer
- Eamonn Holmes – journalist and broadcaster
- Pat Kenny – broadcaster and journalist
- Eoghan McDermott – broadcaster
- Graham Norton – comedian, TV host and actor
- Brendan O'Connor – journalist and broadcaster
- Bill O Herlihy – Raidió Teilifís Éireann broadcaster
- Seamus O'Regan – politician, television personality, and host of CTV's Canada AM, born in Newfoundland, Canada
- Ray Shah – DJ and radio personality
- Kathryn Thomas – Operation Transformation host and broadcaster
- Ryan Tubridy – broadcaster, The Late Late Show host (2009–2023) and writer
- Louis Walsh – music manager and television personality
- Laura Whitmore – television presenter
- Terry Wogan – broadcaster

== Saints ==
- Saint Patrick (1 of the 3 Patron saints of Ireland)
- Aidan of Lindisfarne
- Saint Brigid (1 of the 3 Patron saints of Ireland)
- Saint Brendan
- Saint Caomhán
- Saint Columba (Irish: Colmcille) (1 of 3 Patron saints of Ireland)
- Saint Dymphna
- Saint Enda (Irish: Éanna)
- Saint Kevin (Irish: Caoimhín)
- Saint Lorcán

== Others ==
- Anne Anderson – Irish Ambassador to the United States
- Todd Andrews – civil servant
- Alfred Chester Beatty – mining magnate
- George Berkeley – philosopher
- Brian Boru – 11th-century high-king of Ireland
- Seán Brady – Roman Catholic Archbishop of Armagh and Primate of All Ireland
- Brigh Brigaid – judge (1st-century)
- Ben Briscoe – Fianna Fáil politician and Lord Mayor of Dublin
- Robert Briscoe – Irish Republican Army member, Fianna Fáil politician and Lord Mayor of Dublin
- William Brown – Irish-born Argentine Admiral
- Edmund Burke – philosopher and politician
- Frank E. Butler – marksman
- Graham Cantwell – director
- Edward Carson – Lord Carson, barrister and politician
- Nellie Cashman – gold prospector in the United States (born in County Cork)
- Cheiro – astrologer
- Harry Clarke – stained glass artist
- Bonnie Ann Clyde - Drag queen and RuPaul's Drag Race UK series 7 contestant.
- Michael Collins – revolutionary leader and politician
- Ruaidrí Ua Conchobair – high-king of Ireland (12th-century)
- Desmond Connell – Roman Catholic Cardinal of Ireland
- James Craig, 1st Viscount Craigavon – politician
- Tom Crean – explorer
- Rosanna Davison – Miss World 2003
- Moya Doherty – impresario
- Bishop James Doyle – bishop
- Jim Duffy – Irish advisor to Australia's Republic Advisory Committee
- Margaretta Eagar – Limerick-born governess to the last Russian royal family
- Robin Eames – Church of Ireland Archbishop of Armagh and Primate of All Ireland
- Johannes Scotus Eriugena – theologian (born 810)
- Brendan Finucane – fighter pilot for the Royal Air Force
- Michael Anthony Fleming – Bishop of St. John's, Newfoundland and Labrador
- Eileen Flynn – Senator
- Brian Gibbons – Welsh politician
- Glenda Gilson – model
- Cathal Goulding – Former Chief of Staff of the Irish Republican Army and the Official IRA.
- Veronica Guerin – journalist, murdered by drug dealers in 1996
- Rory Hearne – academic and political candidate
- Mary, Lady Heath – early aviator
- Deirdre Jacob – woman who disappeared in 1998
- Sir William Johnson, 1st Baronet – pioneer settler of America
- Peter Lacy – Russian field marshal
- James Larkin – labour leader
- Samantha Lewthwaite – terrorism suspect
- Luguaedon of Inchagoill – (c. 500) hermit
- Eliza Lynch – mistress of Francisco Solano López, Paraguayan dictator
- Annette Elizabeth Mahon (1918–2013) – only Irish women in the ATA during World War II
- Dubhaltach Mac Fhirbhisigh – scribe, translator, historian and genealogist
- Edward MacLysaght – Chief Herald of Ireland, 1943–1954
- Martin Maher – cadet instructor at the United States Military Academy
- Diarmuid Martin – Roman Catholic Archbishop of Dublin and Primate of Ireland
- Edward Martyn – co-founder of the Irish Literary Theatre
- Catherine McAuley – founder the Sisters of Mercy
- Kevin McClory – screenwriter, producer and director
- John McKenna – Liverpool FC manager
- Seán William McLoughlin (AKA Jacksepticeye) – YouTube personality
- Michael Mills – ombudsman and political journalist
- Seán Milroy – revolutionary politician
- Annie Moore – first person to pass through the Ellis Island immigration system
- John Moore – director
- Lord Killanin – head of the International Olympic Committee
- Kevin Murphy – Ombudsman and Information Commissioner
- Patricia O'Brien – United Nations Under-Secretary-General for Legal Affairs and United Nations Legal Counsel, Irish Ambassador to Geneva
- May O'Callaghan – suffragette and communist
- Dáithí Ó Conaill - Former vice-president of Sinn Féin and Republican Sinn Féin, also a member of the IRA Army Council of the Provisional IRA
- Pat O'Connor – director
- Seosamh Ó Duibhginn – writer, editor, publisher, Republican and Gaelic language activist
- Gráinne O'Malley – pirate queen
- Emily O'Reilly – journalist, ombudsman and Information Commissioner
- Ian Paisley – Lord Paisley, Northern Irish politician
- Saint Patrick – Irish patron saint
- Margaret Phelan – founder of the Kilkenny Archeological Society
- Horace Plunkett – founder of co-operative movement
- Jennie Wyse Power – activist, feminist, politician and businesswoman
- Phoebe Prince – victim of bullycide
- Jon Riley – major in the Saint Patrick's Battalion of the Mexican Army
- Robert Ross – British Army officer during the Napoleonic Wars
- Mary Ryan – first woman in Ireland or Great Britain to be appointed Professor in a university
- Ernest Shackleton – explorer
- William Petty, 2nd Earl of Shelburne – British Prime Minister
- Mary Sheldreck – revolutionary killed in the Easter Rising, April 1916
- Gerard Slevin – Chief Herald of Ireland, 1954–1981
- Timothy Smiddy – academic, economist, Ireland's first ambassador
- Lisa Smith – soldier
- Olivia Taaffe – founder of St Joseph's Young Priests Society
- Mary Catherine Tinney – first female Irish ambassador (to Sweden)
- Thomas Joseph Tormey – Garda Síochána officer
- Philip Treacy – milliner
- David Trimble – Lord Trimble, Northern Irish politician
- Peter Tyndall – ombudsman
- Arthur Wellesley, 1st Duke of Wellington – Field Marshal (defeated Napoleon at Battle of Waterloo), Commander-in-Chief of the British Army and British Prime Minister
- Mary Whelan – Irish diplomat, appointed ambassador to Austria in 2014

== See also ==
- List of Cork people
- List of people from County Donegal
- List of people from Dublin
- List of Galway people
- List of people from County Kilkenny
- List of people from County Limerick
- List of people from County Meath
- List of people from Sligo
- List of people from Waterford
