= List of people from County Limerick =

This is a list of notable people who are from Limerick city or county, Ireland, or have strong associations with either.

== Arts ==
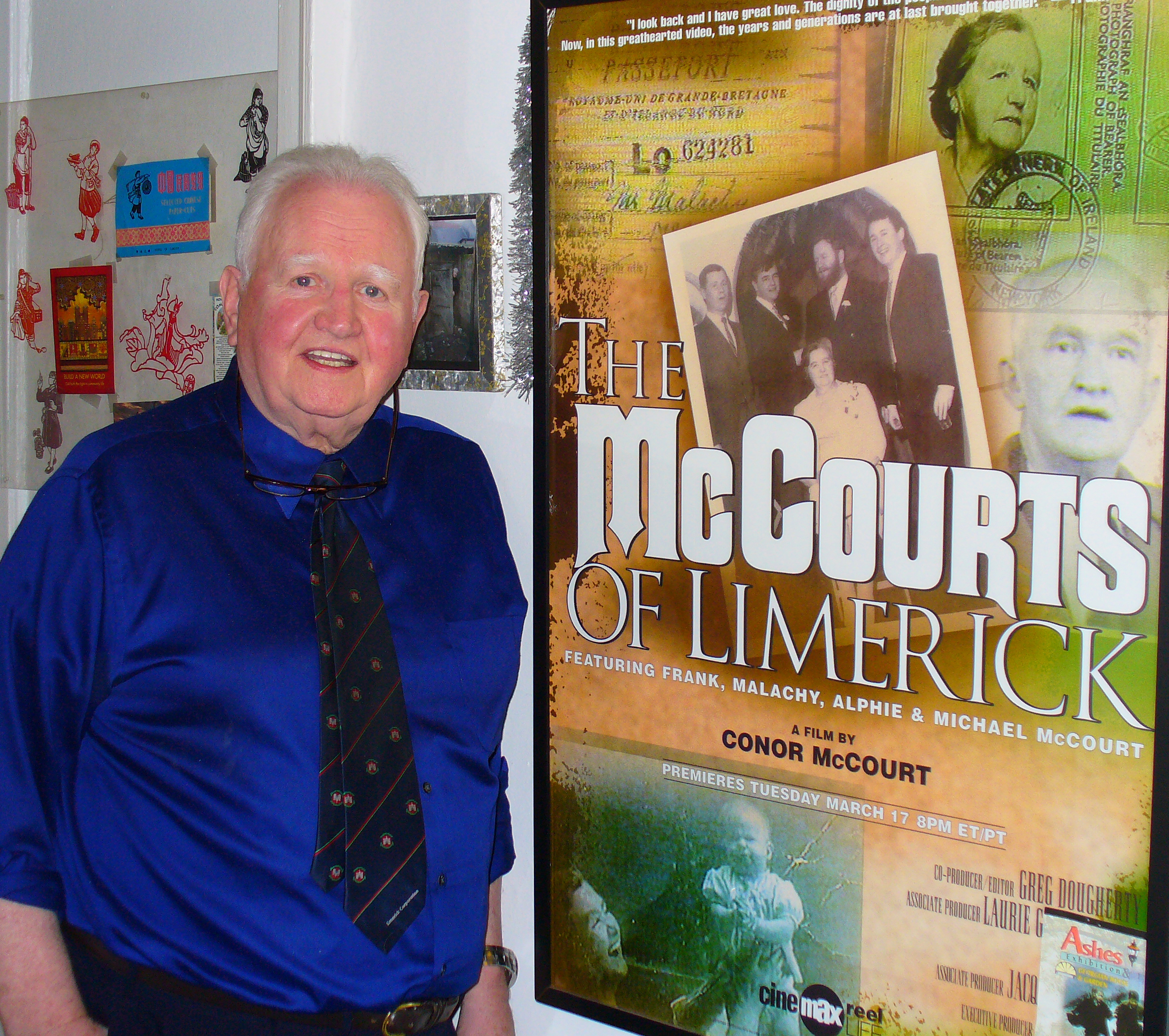
Malachy McCourt

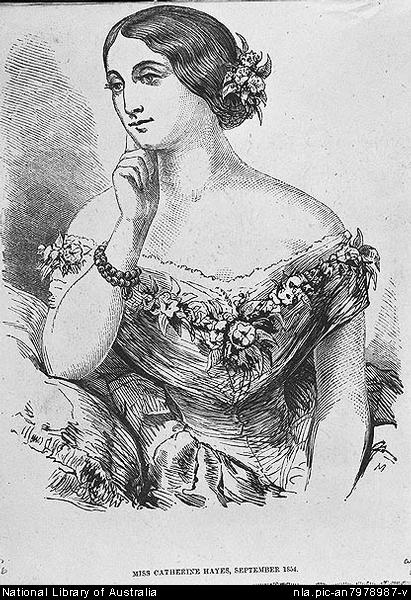
Catherine Hayes, soprano

- G. E. M. Anscombe, English philosopher and theologian, born in Limerick
- Kevin Barry, author, born in Limerick in 1969
- George Geary Bennis (1790–1866), writer and librarian
- Tomás de Bhaldraithe (1916–1996), Irish language scholar and lexicographer, born Ballincurra
- David Noel Bourke, screenwriter and film director
- Máire Bradshaw, poet and publisher
- Vincent Browne, journalist and broadcaster
- Mairead Buicke, opera singer
- Denise Chaila, rapper
- David Chambers, aka Blindboy Boatclub, satirist, musician, podcaster, author, and TV presenter
- Tony Clarkin, actor of stage, television, radio, film; voice-over artist
- Cliodhna Cussen, sculptor, born Newcastle West
- Lawrence Doheny, writer, producer, director of Six Million Dollar Man and Magnum PI
- Desmond FitzGerald, 29th Knight of Glin, President of the Irish Georgian Society
- David Gleeson, writer and director of the feature films Cowboys & Angels and The Front Line
- Richard Graves, theological scholar and author, born near Kilmallock
- Gerald Griffin (1803–1840), novelist, poet and playwright
- Richard Harris, actor
- Catherine Hayes, soprano
- Mike Hogan, member of pop band The Cranberries
- Noel Hogan, member of pop band The Cranberries
- Celia Holman Lee, model agent and TV presenter
- Richard D. James aka Aphex Twin, electronic musician
- Charles Johnstone, novelist
- Patrick Weston Joyce, historian, music-collector, onomastician, and lexicographer
- Robert Dwyer Joyce, poet, song-writer, Fenian, and physician
- Sean Keating, painter
- Marian Keyes, author
- Jon Kenny, member of D'unbelievables comedy duo; regular member of the Father Ted series
- Emma Langford, folk singer-songwriter
- Fergal Lawler, member of pop band The Cranberries
- Gearóid Mac Eoin, academic whose studies have focused on aspects of Irish language, literature and history
- Ciaran MacMathuna, broadcaster and musicologist
- Alphie McCourt, author of A Long Stones Throw, Heartscald (The Soulswimmer, US title)
- Frank McCourt, author of Angela's Ashes, 'Tis and Teacher Man
- Malachy McCourt, actor and writer
- Conor McNamara, sports commentator
- Leanne Moore, singer and TV presenter
- Kate O'Brien, author
- Ruth Negga, film and TV actress
- Kate O'Brien, author
- Emma O'Driscoll, member of pop band Six; television presenter
- Críostóir Ó Floinn, poet and playwright
- Dolores O'Riordan, member of pop band The Cranberries
- Matthew Potter, author
- Arthur Quinlan, local journalist formerly based at Shannon Airport for the Irish Times
- Liam Redmond, stage, TV and film actor, active from the 1940s to the 1970s
- The Rubberbandits, comedy hip-hop duo
- Darren Shan, internationally published children's author
- Sharon Slater, author
- Constance Smith, Hollywood actress of the 1950s
- Bill Whelan, Grammy Award-winning composer of Riverdance and many other works
- Terry Wogan, presenter on BBC radio and television

== Business ==
Sir Thomas Cleeve

- Sir Thomas Cleeve, founder and chairman of the Condensed Milk Company of Ireland, High Sheriff of Limerick city (1899, 1900, and 1908)
- Patrick Collison, CEO of Stripe
- JP McManus, businessman, entrepreneur and philanthropist

== Science ==
- Laurence Cussen, East India Company surveyor who triangulated the Auckland Province (1876), photographed Māori (1884) and published research in the colony of New Zealand.
- William Henry Harvey, algae botanist, born Summerville, County Limerick
- Lady Mary Heath, pioneering aviator who flew from Cape Town to London (1928) and set records for altitude in a light aircraft (1927). The first female to complete a mechanic qualification in the US, parachute from an aeroplane (1927) and have a commercial pilot licence in Britain (1927). Born Knockaderry.
- John Philip Holland, invented the submarine (1881).
- Mary McCoy, Irish nurse who served during the American Civil War at the Battle of Fair Oaks and met President Lincoln.
- Cliona O'Farrelly, immunologist at Trinity College Dublin, born in Adare
- Sylvester O'Halloran, invented cataract surgery (1750)
- Michael O'Shaughnessy, designed the San Francisco streetcar system (1927), the O'Shaughnessy Dam (1923) and the Hetch Hetchy Aqueduct (1923).
- William Brooke O'Shaughnessy, early anaesthetist who introduced the therapeutic use of cannabis to Western medicine (1838), pioneered intravenous fluid therapy to treat cholera (1831) and established a telegraph system in India (1852).

== Politics ==
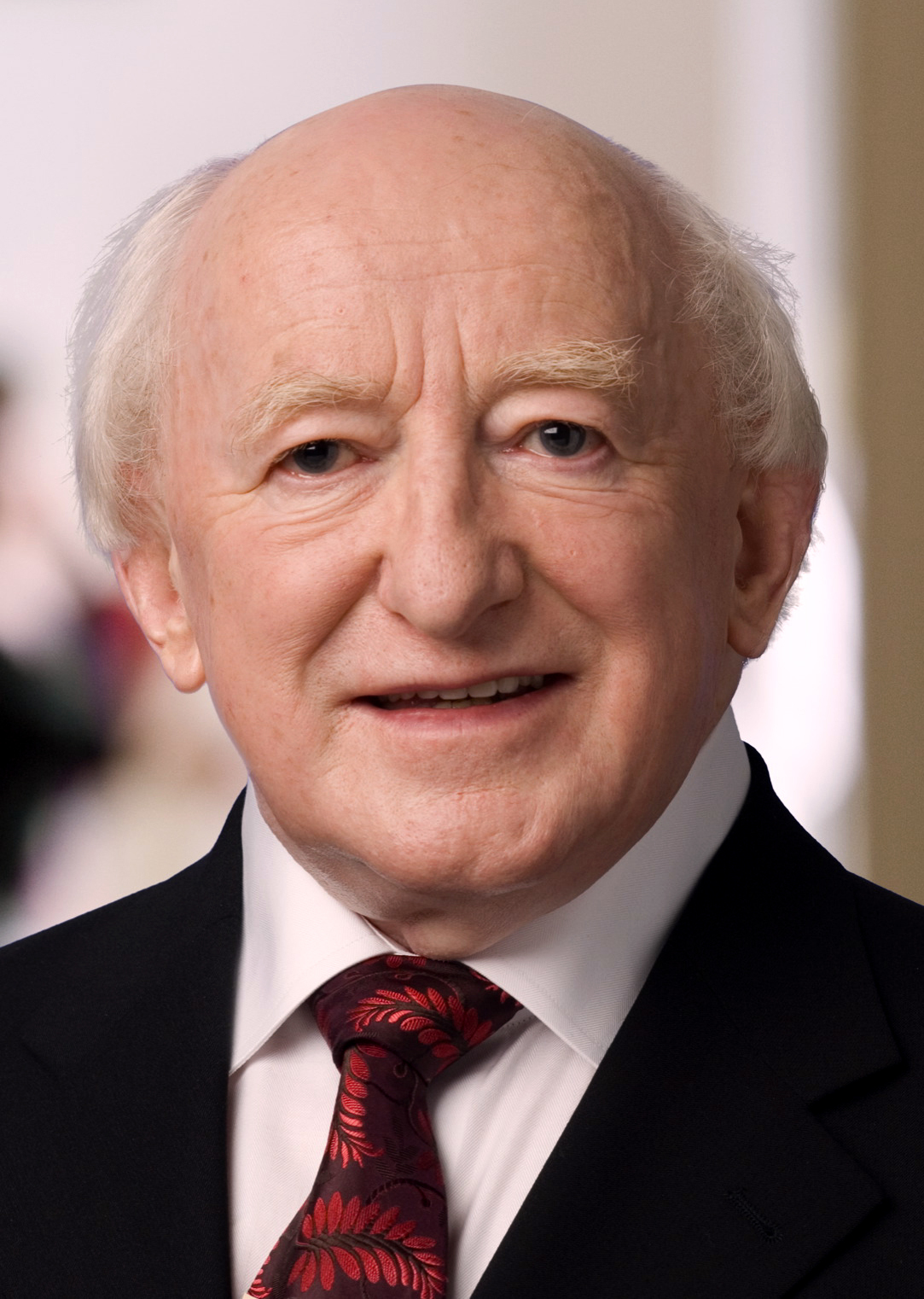
Michael D. Higgins

- Serena Armstrong-Jones, Countess of Snowdon, wife of the Earl of Snowdon, and member, by marriage, of the extended British Royal Family
- James P. Boyd, businessman and politician in Ontario, Canada
- Frances Condell, first female mayor of Limerick.
- Kathleen Clarke (1878–1972), First Lady Mayoress of Dublin, widow of Tom Clarke
- Niall Collins, Irish politician
- Stephen Coughlan (Labour), TD 1961–77; Mayor of Limerick 1951–52, 1969–70
- Pat Cox, TD 1992–94; MEP 1989–2004; President of the European Parliament 2002–04
- Éamon de Valera (Fianna Fáil), TD; Taoiseach; President of Ireland; raised in Bruree, County Limerick
- Frances Fitzgerald (Fine Gael), Tánaiste 2016–2017, born Croom
- Michael D. Higgins, elected President of Ireland in 2011
- Jim Kemmy (Labour and Democratic Socialist Party), TD 1981–1982, 1987–1997; Mayor of Limerick 1991–92, 1995–96
- Michael Lipper (Labour), TD 1977–81; Mayor of Limerick 1973–74
- Michael Noonan (Fine Gael), TD 1981–present; former Leader of Fine Gael; Minister for Justice, Minister for Health
- Dan Neville (Fine Gael), TD 1997–2016, born Croagh
- Tom Neville (Fine Gael), TD 2016–2020, from Limerick
- Willie O'Dea (Fianna Fáil), TD, 1982–present; Minister for Defence
- Kieran O'Donnell (Fine Gael), TD since 2007, from Limerick
- Desmond O'Malley (Fianna Fáil and Progressive Democrats), TD, 1968–2002; founder and Leader of the Progressive Democrats
- Donogh O'Malley (Fianna Fáil), TD 1954–1968; Minister for Health and Minister for Education
- Tim O'Malley (Progressive Democrats), TD 2002–2007, Minister of State for Health
- Jan O'Sullivan (Labour), TD 1998–present; Mayor of Limerick 1993–94
- Peter Power, TD for Limerick East (2002–2011), Overseas Development minister (2008–2011), born in Limerick
- Patrick L. Quinlan (1883–1948), Irish-American radical journalist and political activist, born in Limerick

== Sport ==
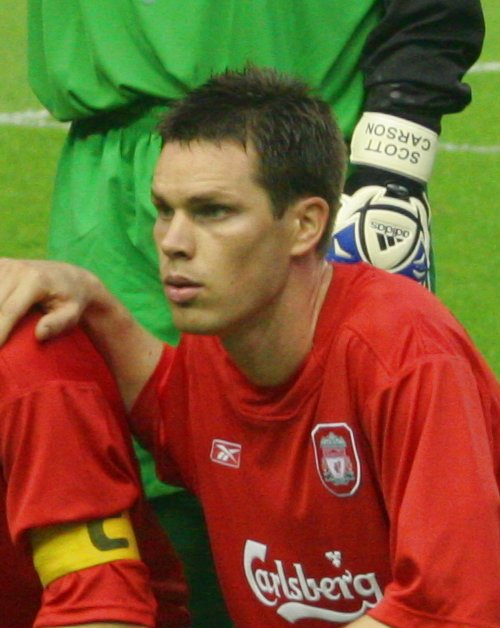
Steve Finnan

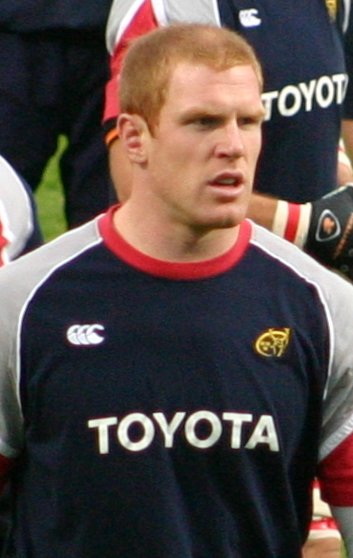
Paul O'Connell

- Tim Ahearne, athlete; Olympic gold medallist with Great Britain and Ireland – triple jump (1908)
- Tom Aherne, soccer player; Limerick FC; Luton Town FC; Republic of Ireland (16 Caps)
- Richie Bennis, hurler; Patrickswell; Limerick; 1 GAA All Stars Awards; 1 All-Ireland – 1973
- Ciarán Carey, hurler; Patrickswell; Limerick; 3 GAA All Stars Awards;
- Peter Clohessy, rugby player; Young Munster; Munster; Ireland (54 Caps)
- Eamonn Cregan, hurler; Claughan; Limerick; 3 GAA All Stars Awards; 1 All-Ireland – 1973
- Tim Cuneen, soccer player; Limerick FC; Coleraine FC; Republic of Ireland (1 Cap)
- Sean Cusack, soccer player; Limerick FC; Republic of Ireland (1 Cap)
- Keith Earls, rugby player; Young Munster; Munster; Ireland (65 Caps); British and Irish Lions
- Leonard Enright, hurler; Patrickswell; Limerick; 3 GAA All Stars Awards
- Connie Finnan, darts player; Garryowen; World Grand Prix Last 16: 2013
- Steve Finnan, soccer player; Liverpool F.C.; Republic of Ireland (50 Caps)
- Al Finucane, soccer player; Limerick FC; Waterford United FC; Republic of Ireland (11 Caps)
- Kevin Fitzpatrick, soccer player; Limerick FC; Republic of Ireland (1 Cap)
- John Flanagan, athlete; 3 time Olympic gold medallist with the US in the hammer throw (1900, 1904, 1908)
- Jerry Flannery, rugby player; Shannon RFC; Munster; Ireland (21 Caps)
- Anthony Foley, rugby player; Shannon RFC; Munster Rugby; Ireland (62 Caps); European Rugby Cup winning captain – Munster, 2006
- Mark Foley, hurler; Adare; Limerick; 2 GAA All-Stars Awards
- Seán Foley, hurler; Patrickswell; Limerick; 1 All-Ireland – 1973; 1 GAA All Stars Awards
- Johnny Gavin, soccer player; Limerick FC; Norwich City FC; Tottenham Hotspur FC; Watford FC; Crystal Palace FC; Republic of Ireland (7 Caps)
- Tommy Gaynor, soccer player; Limerick FC; Shamrock Rovers FC; Dundalk; Nottingham Forest; Millwall; Cork City; Bohemians; Athlone Town; Kilkenny City; PFAI Player of the Year 1984/85
- Don Givens, soccer player; Irish international 1969–81
- Eamonn Grimes, hurler; South Liberties; Limerick; 2 GAA All Stars Awards; All-Ireland winning captain 1973; Texaco Hurler of the Year, 1973
- Pat Hartigan, hurler; South Liberties; Limerick; 1 All-Ireland – 1973; 5 GAA All Stars Awards
- John Hayes, rugby player; Bruff RFC; Shannon RFC; Munster; Ireland (84 Caps)
- Willie Hayes, soccer player; Limerick FC; Torquay United FC; Wrexham FC; Republic of Ireland (1 Cap)
- Marcus Horan, rugby player; Shannon RFC; Munster; Ireland (56 Caps)
- Mike Houlihan, hurler; Kilmallock; Limerick; 2 GAA All-Stars Awards
- Des Kennedy, soccer player; Limerick FC; Galway United FC
- Gary Kirby, hurler; Patrickswell; Limerick; 4 GAA All Stars Awards
- Con Leahy, athlete, Olympic Medallist with Great Britain & Ireland – high jump silver (1908)
- Patrick Leahy, athlete, Olympic Medallist with Great Britain & Ireland – high jump silver (1900), long jump bronze (1904)
- Andy Lee, boxer; St. Francis' Boxing Club; European Amateur Boxing Championships – bronze (2002), silver (2004), WBO Middleweight Champion
- Becky Lynch, professional wrestler; currently signed under WWE in the Raw brand
- Sam Lynch, rower; St. Michael's Rowing Club; Ireland; World Champion Single Sculler 2000 & 2001
- John Mackey, hurler; Ahane; Limerick; 3 All-Irelands – 1934, 1936 and 1940
- Mick Mackey, hurler; Ahane; Limerick; 3 All-Irelands – 1934, 1936 and 1940; GAA Hurling Team of the Millennium
- Ger McDonnell, mountaineer; first Irishman to summit K-2
- Joe McKenna, hurler; South Liberties; Limerick; 1 All-Ireland – 1973; 6 GAA All Stars Awards
- Conor Murray, rugby player; Munster; Ireland; British and Irish Lions
- Conor Niland, tennis player; international professional tennis player
- Jim O'Brien, hurler; Bruree; Limerick; 1 All-Ireland – 1973; 1 GAA All Stars Award
- Paul O'Connell, rugby player; Young Munster; Munster; Ireland (52 Caps); British and Irish Lions; European Rugby Cup winning captain – Munster, 2008
- William O'Connor, darts player; Cappamore; World Grand Prix Last 32: 2010, 2011, 2012, 2015
- Liam O'Donoghue, hurler; Mungret; Limerick; 1 All-Ireland – 1973; 1 GAA All Stars Award
- Frank O'Mara, athlete; World Indoor 3000m champion
- Jackie Power, hurler; Ahane; Limerick; 2 All-Irelands – 1936 and 1940; All-Ireland winning manager 1973
- Joe Quaid, hurler; Murroe-Boher; Limerick; 2 GAA All-Star Awards
- Tommy Quaid, hurler; Feohanagh; Limerick; 1 GAA All Stars Awards
- Patrick Ryan, athlete, Olympic gold medallist with the US in the hammer throw (1920)
- Paddy Waldron, first-class cricketer
- David Wallace, rugby player; Garryowen; Munster; Ireland (46 Caps); British and Irish Lions
- Paul Wallace, rugby player; Garryowen; Saracens; Munster; Ireland (45 Caps); British and Irish Lions
- Richard Wallace, rugby player; Garryowen; Munster; Ireland (29 Caps); British and Irish Lions
- Johnny Walsh, soccer player; Limerick FC; Republic of Ireland (1 Cap)

== Military ==
- Walter Burke purser on HMS Victory, held Lord Nelson when he died (1736–1815)
- Nathaniel Burslem, recipient of the Victoria Cross
- Cornelius Colbert, Irish rebel and pioneer of Fianna Éireann
- Michael Colivet, Irish rebel, Commandant of 1916 Rising in Limerick and first TD for Limerick in Dáil Éireann
- Edward Daly, Commandant of 1916 Rising – Four Courts
- John Danaher, recipient of the Victoria Cross
- Tiede Herrema, Dutch businessman based in Limerick, abducted by the IRA in 1973
- Peter Lacy, Russian Field Marshal, born Killeedy
- Sir Thomas Myles, surgeon, sailor, Home Ruler and gun-runner (1857–1937)
- Michael O'Rourke, recipient of the Victoria Cross
- Seán South, IRA volunteer killed on active service in 1957

== Historical ==
- Margaretta Eagar (1863–1936), governess to the last Russian Royal Family
- Mary Jane Kelly (c. 1863–1888), Jack the Ripper victim
- Rosina Bulwer Lytton (1802–1882), author
- William Monsell, 1st Baron Emly (1812–1894), statesman and reformer
- John T. Mullock (1807–1869), Roman Catholic bishop of St. John's, Newfoundland (1850–1869)
- Mary O'Connell (1814–1897), nurse during the American Civil War.

== Religion ==
- Christine Frost (born 1937), Catholic religious sister
- Mary Kostka Kirby (1863–1952), New Zealand Catholic nun

== See also ==
- List of Irish people
