= List of people from County Meath =

This is a list of notable people who were either born in County Meath, have lived there for a significant portion of their lives or are otherwise generally associated with the county.

== Aristocracy ==
- Nicholas St Lawrence (c. 1550 – 1607), 9th Baron Howth
- Egidia de Lacy (1205-?), Lady of Connacht
- Hugh de Lacy (c. 1176 – 1242), Earl of Ulster
- Hugh de Lacy (c. 1135 – 1186), First Lord of Meath, built Trim Castle
- Walter de Lacy (1172–1241), Lord of Meath
- Garret Wesley (1735–1781), 1st Earl of Mornington
- John Netterville (1603–1659), 2nd Viscount Netterville
- Nicholas Netterville (1581–1654), 1st Viscount Netterville
- Elizabeth Darcy (1332–1390), Countess of Ormond
- Jenet Sarsfield (1528–1598), noblewoman
- Simon Fleming (died 1370), 1st Baron Slane
- Lady Anne Culling Smith (1775–1844), sister of the Duke of Wellington
- John Barnewall (died 1538), 3rd Baron Trimlestown

== Politics ==
- Yemi Adenuga (born 1971), first black woman to be elected to local government in Ireland
- Thomas Brennan (1853–1912), co-founder of the Irish National Land League
- John Bruton (born 1947), Taoiseach 1994–1997
- Christopher Fleming (1669–1726), Member of Parliament
- Thomas Fleming (1358–1435), Member of Parliament
- Thomas Fleming (died 1601), Member of Parliament
- Thomas Hussey (1749–1824), MP for Aylesbury
- Sir William Johnson (c. 1715 – 1774), diplomat
- Frank McLoughlin (born 1946), TD for Meath
- Matthew O'Reilly (1880–1962), TD for Meath
- William Wellesley-Pole (1763–1845), Chief Secretary for Ireland
- Nicholas Plunkett (1602–1680), Member of Parliament
- John Reilly (1646–1717), Member of Parliament
- Francis Singleton (1812–1887), member of the Western Australian Legislative Council

== Law ==
- John Lowth (1822–1877), lawyer
- Peter Metge (1740–1809), judge
- Luke Netterville (1510–1560), judge
- Richard Netterville (1540–1607), barrister
- Nicholas Nugent (1525–1582), Solicitor-General for Ireland
- Thomas Plunket (1440–1519), Chief Justice of the Common Pleas for Ireland
- Thomas Fitz-Christopher Plunket (1407–1471), Lord Chief Justice of Ireland
- Richard Plunkett (1340–1393), judge and statesman
- Richard Rede (fl. 1416), statesman
- Edward George Ryan (1810–1880), 3rd chief justice of the Wisconsin Supreme Court
- Patrick Segrave (died 1610), judge
- Richard Segrave (1540–1598), judge
- James Alleyn (died 1457), Lord Chief Justice of Ireland
- William Skrene (1350–1421), Chief Baron of the Irish Exchequer
- Barnaby Skurloke (1520–1587), lawyer
- Richard Sydgrave (died 1425), Chief Baron of the Irish Exchequer
- Richard White (died 1367), Lord Chief Justice of Ireland
- Patrick White (1480–1561), Baron of the Court of Exchequer

== Military ==
- Guy Johnson (c. 1740 – 1788), British officer in the American Revolutionary War
- Patrick James Leonard (1847–1899), United States Army sergeant and Medal of Honor recipient
- Tony Magan (1910–1981), Chief of Staff of the IRA
- Simon Mangan (died 1906), Lord Lieutenant of Meath
- Thomas Meredyth (died 1719), officer
- John Nangle (died 1508), soldier
- Richard Ridgeway (1848–1924), Victoria Cross recipient
- Frederick Augustus Smith (1826–1887), Victoria Cross recipient
- Thomas Sullivan (1859–1940), soldier and US Medal of Honor recipient
- Thomas Preston (1585–1655), soldier and mercenary
- Peter Warren (1703–1752), Royal Navy officer
- Arthur Wellesley (1769–1852), defeated Napoleon at the Battle of Waterloo

== Royalty ==
- Máel Dóid mac Suibni (died 653), King of Uisneach
- Máel Sechnaill mac Máele Ruanaid (died 862), High King of Ireland
- Rose Ní Conchobair (fl. 1180), Lady of Meath
- Cormac mac Art Ó Melaghlain (1182–1239), King of Meath
- Órlaith íngen Cennétig (died 941), Queen of Ireland
- Tigernach mac Fócartai (died 865), King of Loch Gabhair
- Túathal Máelgarb (died 540s), High King of Ireland
- Donnell Mor Mideach Ua Conchobair (1144–1176), Prince of Connacht

== Sports ==
- Darragh Burns (born 2002), footballer
- Sam Curtis (born 2005), footballer
- Dawson Devoy (born 2001), footballer
- Luke Heeney (born 1999), footballer
- Evan Ferguson (born 2004), footballer
- James Finnerty (born 1999), footballer
- Conor Keeley (born 1997), footballer
- Josh Keeley (born 2003), footballer
- Darragh Lenihan (born 1994), footballer
- Tommy Lonergan (born 2004), footballer
- Adrian Maguire (born 1971), trainer and jockey
- Dónal McDermott (born 1989), footballer
- Séamus McDonagh (born 1962), boxer
- Jamie McGrath (born 1996), footballer
- Luke McNally (born 1999), footballer
- Brendan Murphy (born 1975), footballer
- Éamonn O'Brien (born 1960), footballer and manager of Meath
- Georgie Poynton (born 1997), footballer
- Andrew Quinn (born 2002), footballer
- Ger Robinson (born 1982), footballer
- Gary Rogers (born 1981), football goalkeeper
- Edward Rooney (1880–1950), cricketer
- Tom Sheridan (born 1969), handball player
- Brian Smyth (1924–2016), footballer
- Kevin Toner (born 1996), footballer
- Emre Topçu (born 2005), footballer
- Adderley Wilkinson (1887–1978), cricketer

== Religion ==
- Felim of Kilmore (6th century), saint
- Ia of Cornwall (died 5th century), saint
- Lommán of Trim (died 6th century), saint
- Mac Nisse of Connor (died 514), saint
- Tola of Clonard (died 700s), saint
- Robert Barnewall (1704–1779), religious rights activist
- Thomas Hussey (1746–1803), bishop and diplomat
- James Keene (1849–1919), bishop
- Richard Lacy (1841–1929), Bishop of Middlesbrough
- Petronilla de Meath (1300–1324), first known person in Ireland to be burned for heresy
- Thomas Messingham (died 1638), hagiologist
- Denis Nulty (born 1963), Bishop of Kildare and Leighlin
- Thomas Nulty (1818–1898), Bishop of Meath
- Eugene O'Growney (1863–1899), priest
- Peter Joseph O'Reilly (1850–1923), Auxiliary bishop of Peoria
- John Payne (died 1507), Bishop of Meath
- Oliver Plunkett (1625–1681), Archbishop of Armagh
- Joseph Rooney (died 1857), missionary
- Secundinus (died 448), Bishop of Armagh
- Michael Smith (born 1940), Bishop of Meath
- Paul Tighe (born 1958), prelate
- Walter Wellesley (1470–1539), Bishop of Kildare
- William Walsh (1512–1577), Bishop of Meath

== Entertainment ==
- Pierce Brosnan (born 1953), actor
- Robin McAuley (born 1953), rock vocalist
- Joe Moore (1894–1926), actor
- Matt Moore (1888–1960), actor
- Owen Moore (1886–1939), actor
- Tom Moore (1883–1955), actor and director
- Dylan Moran, comedian
- Henry Mountcharles (born 1951), organiser of the Slane Concert
- Daráine Mulvihill (born 1983), television personality
- Sibéal Ní Chasaide (born 1998), singer
- Bláthnaid Ní Chofaigh (born 1970), television presenter
- Maighréad Ní Dhomhnaill (born 1955), singer
- Sinéad Noonan (born 1987), model
- Ciarán Ó Cofaigh (born 1968), director and producer
- Hector Ó hEochagáin radio and television presenter
- Nathan O'Toole (born 1998), actor
- Angela Scanlon (born 1983), television presenter
- Tommy Tiernan comedian, actor and television presenter
- Sharon Horgan (born 1970), actor
- Justine Stafford, comedian and YouTuber

== Science and education ==
- Francis Beaufort (1774–1857), hydrographer, creator of the Beaufort scale
- Sir Thomas Molyneux (1661–1733), physician
- C. Y. O'Connor (1843–1902), engineer
- Peadar Ó Gealacáin (1792–1860), scribe
- Francis Porter (fl. 1650–1702), professor
- Francis Webb Sheilds (1820–1906), engineer

== Art and literature ==
- Anthony Holten (1945–2020), author
- Francis Ledwidge (1887–1917), poet
- J.S. Anna Liddiard (1773–1819), poet
- Liam Mac Cóil (born 1952), Irish language novelist
- Séamas Dall Mac Cuarta (c. 1647 – 1733), poet
- Seon Mac Solaidh (fl. 1720), poet and scribe
- Martina Fitzgerald, journalist and author
- Arthur Mathews (born 1959), writer
- John Mulvany (1839–1906), artist
- Aonghus Fionn Ó Dálaigh (died 1570), poet
- Donnchadh Mór Ó Dálaigh (died 1244), poet
- Joseph Osborne (1810–1901), author
- Edward Lovett Pearce (1699–1733), architect
- Richard Pigott (1835–1889), journalist
- John B. Sheridan (1870–1930), sportswriter
- Edward Smyth (1749–1812), sculptor
- Gilla Mo Dutu Úa Caiside (fl. 1147), poet
- Orla de Brí (born 1965), sculptor

== See also ==
- List of Irish people
