= Peadar =

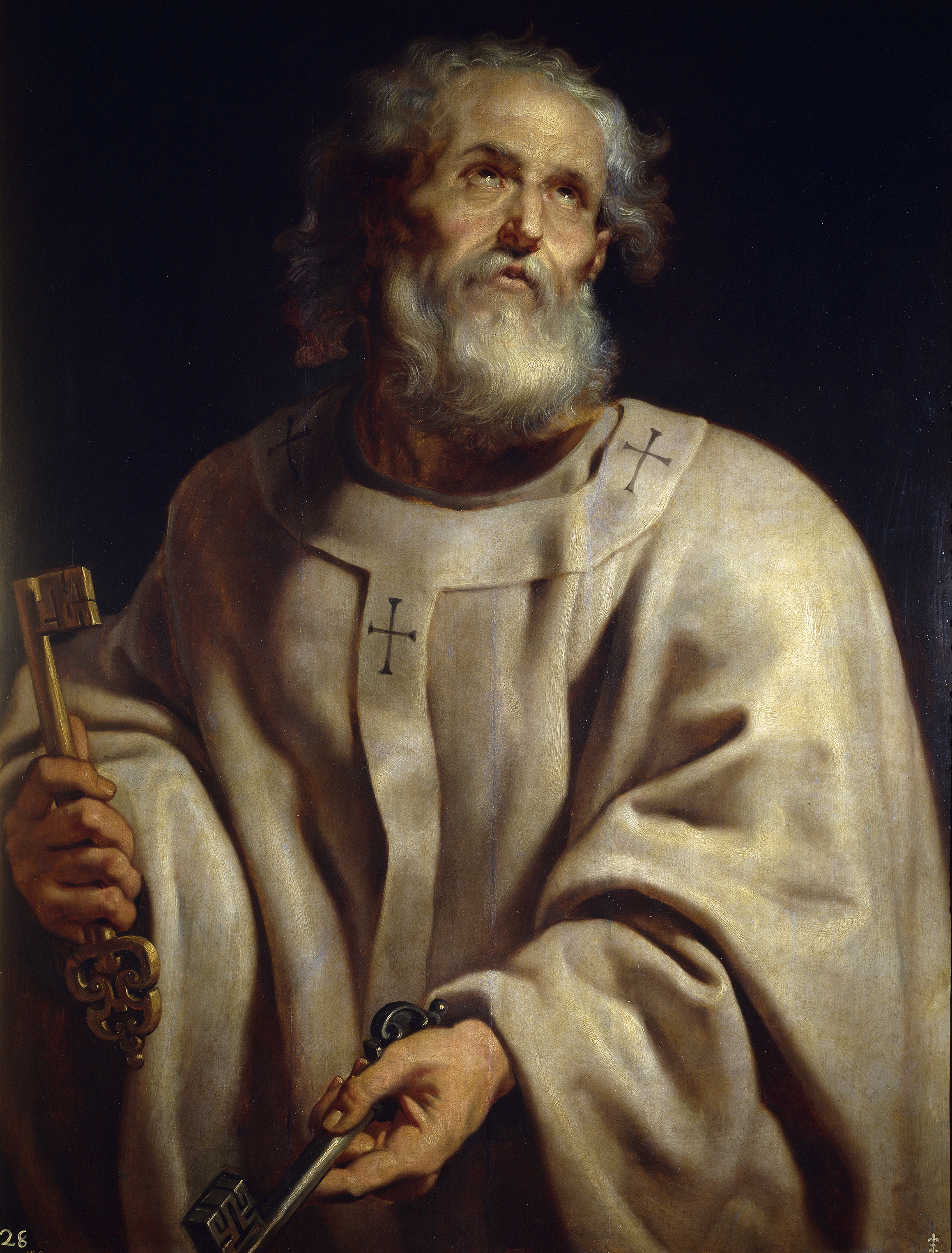
- Saint Peter
- Pronunciation: Irish: [ˈpʲad̪ˠəɾˠ]
- Gender: Masculine
- Language: Irish, Scottish Gaelic

Origin
- Language: Greek
- Derivation: petros
- Meaning: "stone", "rock"

Other names
- Cognate: Peter
- See also: Pádraig

Peadar is a masculine given name in Irish and Scottish Gaelic (in Manx the name is spelt Peddyr). The names are ultimately derived from the Greek word petros 'stone, rock', making them cognates to English Peter.

People with the given name include:

- Peadar Ó Doirnín (c. 1700–1769), Ulster poet
- Peadar Andrews, Irish Gaelic footballer in 2005 and 2006
- Peadar Byrne, Irish former Gaelic footballer
- Peadar Carton (born 1986), Irish hurler
- Peadar Clancy (1888–1920), member of the Irish Republican Army who participated the 1916 Easter Rising
- Peadar Clohessy (1933–2014), Irish politician
- Peadar Cowan (1903–1962), Irish politician
- Peadar Doyle (died 1956), Irish politician
- Peadar Duignan (1898–1955), Irish politician
- Peadar Gaskins (1908–1949), Irish footballer
- Peadar Kearney (1883–1942), Irish republican and composer of numerous rebel songs
- Peadar Kirby, author and academic at the Department of Politics and Public Administration at the University of Limerick
- Peadar Livingstone (1930–1987), Irish Roman Catholic priest and scholar
- Peadar Toner Mac Fhionnlaoich (1857–1942), Irish writer
- Peadar Maher (1924–2012), Irish politician and publican
- Peadar Ó Guilín, Irish novelist
- Peadar O'Donnell (1893–1986), Irish republican Marxist activist and writer
- Peadar O'Loughlin (1929–2017), Irish flute, fiddle, and uilleann pipes player
- Peadar Tóibín (born 1974), Irish politician
- Peadar Uí Gealacáin (1793–1860), Irish scribe and hedge school master
- Peadar Ua Laoghaire (1839–1920), Irish writer and Catholic priest

== See also ==
- List of Irish-language given names
- List of Scottish Gaelic given names
