= Jim O'Sullivan =

Jim O'Sullivan may refer to:

- Jim O'Sullivan, husband of Irish businesswoman Margaret Molloy
- Jim O'Sullivan (hurler), member of Cork Junior Hurling Team 1994
- Jim O'Sullivan (police commissioner), commissioner 1992–2000 of Queensland Police Service
- Jim O'Sullivan (athlete), Australian 400m silver medallist in 1977 Pacific Conference Games
- Jim O'Sullivan (engineer), Chief Executive of Highways England
