= Pedram Hamrah =

German-American ophthalmologist

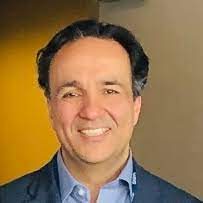
- Pedram Hamrah in 2015
- Education: University of Cologne
- Board member of: American Board of Ophthalmology
- Spouse: Satgin Hamrah
- Medical career
- Field: Ophthalmology, Genetics, Molecular and Cellular Biology; Immunology; Neuroscience; Cell, Molecular and Developmental Biology
- Institutions: Tufts Medical Center - Tufts University; Harvard Medical School-Massachusetts Eye and Ear Infirmary

Pedram Hamrah is a German-American ophthalmologist and immunologist. He obtained his M.D. from the University of Cologne, Germany.

== Career ==
In 2002, together with Reza Dana and Ying Liu, he was the first to discover the presence of and characterize resident antigen-presenting cells in the central cornea. Hamrah is currently Professor and Vice Chair of Research and Academic Programs, co-director of Cornea Service, Director of the Center for Translational Ocular Immunology, Tufts Medical Center, Departments of Ophthalmology, Tufts University. He was a faculty member in the laboratory of Ulrich von Andrian at Harvard's Immune Disease Institute from 2008 to 2012.

Currently, Hamrah serves as the Section Editor for Clinical Science and Clinical Practice of the journal The Ocular Surface, Cornea Section Editor of the journal Eye, Assistant Editor of the journal Ocular Immunology and Inflammation, and Ophthalmology Associate Editor for BMC Ophthalmology. He serves on numerous additional editorial boards and is a peer reviewer for over 45 ophthalmology, immunology, and transplantation journals. He is an instructor at the American Academy of Ophthalmology and recently served as Chair of the ARVO Members-in-Training Committee.

== Award and recognition ==
- Claes Dohlman Society Award.
- The American Society of Cataract and Refractive Surgery Excellence in Research Scholarship Award.
- The Association of University Professors of Ophthalmology/Research to Prevent Blindness Resident and Fellow Research Award.
- The Achievement Award from the American Academy of Ophthalmology.
- Silver Fellow at the Association for Research in Vision and Ophthalmology.

== Selected works ==
- Hamrah, Pedram, Ying Liu, Qiang Zhang, and M. Reza Dana. "The corneal stroma is endowed with a significant number of resident dendritic cells." Investigative Ophthalmology & Visual Science 44, no. 2 (2003): 581–589.
- Hamrah, Pedram, Qiang Zhang, Ying Liu, and M. Reza Dana. "Novel characterization of MHC class II–negative population of resident corneal Langerhans cell–type dendritic cells." Investigative Ophthalmology & Visual Science 43, no. 3 (2002): 639–646.
- Hamrah, Pedram, Syed O. Huq, Ying Liu, Qiang Zhang, and M. Reza Dana. "Corneal immunity is mediated by heterogeneous population of antigen‐presenting cells." Journal of Leukocyte Biology 74, no. 2 (2003): 172–178.
- Cursiefen, Claus, Lu Chen, Magali Saint-Geniez, Pedram Hamrah, Yiping Jin, Saadia Rashid, Bronislaw Pytowski et al. "Nonvascular VEGF receptor 3 expression by corneal epithelium maintains avascularity and vision." Proceedings of the National Academy of Sciences 103, no. 30 (2006): 11405–11410.
- Chen, Lu, Pedram Hamrah, Claus Cursiefen, Qiang Zhang, Bronislaw Pytowski, J. Wayne Streilein, and M. Reza Dana. "Vascular endothelial growth factor receptor-3 mediates induction of corneal alloimmunity." Nature Medicine 10, no. 8 (2004): 813–815.
- Aggarwal, Shruti, Ahmad Kheirkhah, Bernardo M. Cavalcanti, Andrea Cruzat, Arsia Jamali, Pedram Hamrah. “Correlation of Corneal Immune Cell Changes with Clinical Severity in Dry Eye Disease: An in vivo Confocal Microscopy Study.” The Ocular Surface 19, no. 1 (January 2021): 183–189.
- Cox, Stephanie M., Gabriela Dieckmann, Pedram Hamrah, Melina I. Morkin, M. Cuneyt Ozmen, Rumzah Paracha, Ramy Rashad, Nedda Sanayei. “Efficacy and Tolerability of Nortriptyline in the Management of Neuropathic Corneal Pain. The Ocular Surface 18, no. 4 (October 2020): 814-820.
- Ciolino, B. Joseph, Jessica Girgis, Pedram Hamrah, Arsia Jamali, Ahmad Kheirkhah, Hidenaga Kobashi. “A Randomized, Sham-Controlled Trial of Intraductal Meibomian Gland Probing with or without Topical Antibiotic/Steroid for Obstructive Meibomian Gland Dysfunction.” The Ocular Surface 18, no. 4 (October 2020): 852–856.
- Bayraktutar, Betul N., Pedram Hamrah, Jonathan Lilley, Francis S. Mah, Mina Massaro-Giordano, Leyla Yavuz Saricay. “Efficacy of Recombinant Human Nerve Growth Factor in Stage 1 Neurotrophic Keratopathy. Ophthalmology 129, no. 12 (December 2022): 1448–1450.
