= Wentworth Erck =

Irish astronomer (1827–1890)

Wentworth Erck FRAS
- Born: July 27, 1827; Dublin, Ireland
- Died: January 15, 1890 (aged 62); Sherrington, Shankill, Dublin
- Education: Rugby School; Trinity College Dublin
- Known for: Studying binary stars and the Sun
- Scientific career
- Fields: astronomy

Wentworth Erck FRAS (27 July 1827 – 15 January 1890) was an Irish astronomer, poor-law guardian and magistrate. In astronomy, his most notable observations and measurements were of the solar disc and binary stars.

== Early life, education and family ==
Erck was born in Dublin to Caroline Minchin and John Caillard Erck. He was the oldest of four siblings. His first name came from his maternal grandmother, Elizabeth Wentworth, niece of Sir John Wentworth, former governor of New Hampshire and lieutenant-governor of Nova Scotia. His father was an Ecclesiastical Commissioner for Ireland and of Huguenot descent. He studied for a time at Rugby School. He graduated from Trinity College, Dublin, in 1850, and was called to the bar the same year. In 1859, he completed his doctorate in law. He retained a boyhood interest in science, particularly astronomy. He married Charlotte Anne Kingston and they settled at Sherrington, Shankill, Dublin, near Bray, County Wicklow in 1870, not far from his lands and tenants. He was part of the Rathmichael Church of Ireland parish: he was at the consecration in 1864, was a member of the vestry in 1870 and was treasurer in 1877. He constructed an observatory at Sherrington.

== Astronomical career ==
For much of the time his main telescope was one with a 19 cm (7.5 inch) objective which was created by the American astronomer and artist Alvan Clark and formerly owned by British astronomer William Rutter Dawes. Much later he acquired a 38 cm (15-inch) reflector for which he designed an altazimuth mounting. He took a 9 cm (3.5 inch) telescope with him while travelling, very often to London, so that he could continue his observations.

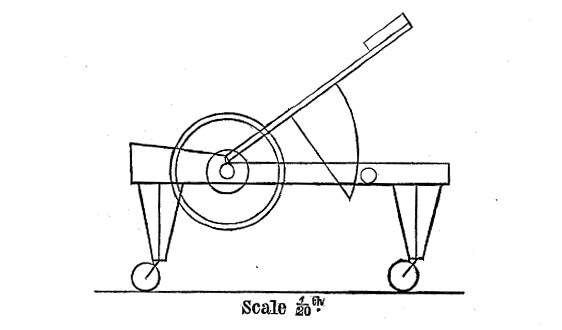
Erck's illustration of his observing chair, from the Monthly Notices of the Royal Astronomical Society, 1875.

From 1869 to 1888, he made notes and drawings of sunspots on the solar disc on most observable days, observations which increased in precision over time with improvements in his equipment. His next most common study was of binary stars: he made nearly two thousand measurements, contenting himself with measurement of the position angles of the pairs and not distances, considering the limitations of his telescope. He spent a fair amount of time observing comites of stars e.g. of Sirius A, Rigel and Procyon. He observed Saturn and its moons. He was the first person in Ireland or Britain to observe the moons of Mars, even missing their discovery by only two weeks (they were discovered by American astronomer Asaph Hall) with a 66 cm (26 inch) reflector); that he noticed them at all with his relatively small telescope was regarded as remarkable. In a letter to the Times, he estimated the diameter of Mars' outer moon, Deimos, as 20 miles (32 km), a little over twice its actual diameter and contradicting other correspondents whose estimates were more accurate.; his comments and the replies were good-natured. In 1878 he published a paper on the Martian satellites in the Scientific Transactions of the Royal Dublin Society. In 1880 he became one of the first astronomers to notice the motion of the red spot of Jupiter against other surface details. He also observed and reported on comets such as the Great Comet of 1882; he published reports of his work, and corrections to it, in local newspapers and scientific journals, including Monthly Notices of the Royal Astronomical Society (of which he became a Fellow in 1855), Nature and The Observatory. His articles included his equipment designs and improvements, for example an adjustable observing chair and a method for reducing heating at the eyepiece while looking at the Sun. Considering his astronomical endeavours he published very little.

== Official career ==
Erck exercised his duties diligently as a magistrate for County Wicklow, a poor law guardian and attending to his lands and tenants. He did not let this work be compromised by his astronomical practices. He turned down an opportunity to become a Conservative member of parliament. Arthur Rambaut (later Royal Astronomer of Ireland) stated that there was no doubt that his public duties affected his health and shortened his life, but he was a happy man of a kindly nature and good spirits and was highly respected. He died at his Sherrington home.

== See also ==
- List of Irish people
