= William Worby Beaumont =

Automotive engineer and inventor (c. 1848–1929)

William Worby Beaumont in 1903

William Worby Beaumont (c. 1848 – 14 April 1929) was an early automotive engineer and inventor.

He was born in Chorlton in Lancashire in about 1848, the son of the agricultural engineer William Henry Beaumont (1827–1907) and his wife Ellen née Worby (1826–1906). On leaving school in 1864 he was an apprentice at the Reading Ironworks Co. before joining the Ipswich works of Ransomes and Sims in 1867 as an Improver under his grandfather, Mr. William Worby, the notable pioneer of agricultural self-movers. Here after five years he was promoted to assistant to Robert Mallet. He left Ransomes to take up an appointment with Vaughan Pendred as joint-editor of The Engineer newspaper, where he remained for about ten years. During his tenure he revealed himself as a dedicated enthusiast for the motor car, which was hardly surprising considering the engineering background of his grandfather, William Worby. In 1895 he attended an exhibition organized by the British Motor Syndicate of a Daimler motor car at The Crystal Palace in London. From 1896 Beaumont was in private practice as a consulting automobile and mechanical engineer and later was technical adviser to the Metropolitan Police for 12 years from 1905 in addition to acting as honorary consulting engineer to the Royal Automobile Club (RAC), of which he was a founding member in 1897.

The first Conditions of Fitness for Taxis specifically written for motor cabs were written under the guidance of Beaumont for the Metropolitan Police, he having been recommended to the Public Carriage Office by Lord Montagu of Beaulieu. Introduced in May 1906, the Conditions of Fitness set out the requirements for vehicles that were to be used as licensed Hackney carriage taxi cabs in London.

Beaumont's listing in the Motoring Annual and Motorist's Year Book for 1904 described him as:

'BEAUMONT, W. Worby, M.I.C.E., M.I.M.E., &c., &c., Outer Temple, 222, Strand, London, W.C. Car: None at present. Hobbies: Cycling, orographic geology, and physical and mechanical experiment. Supports motoring for the improvement in the conduct of traffic of all kinds on roads; the development of a great national industry, and the recovery of the premiership of the United Kingdom, in the construction of mechanically-propelled vehicles. Is a practical engineer. Has carried out extensive experiments in steam condensation, and in connection with steam, oil and gas-engines. In 1898 was President of the Society of Engineers. Is the author of "Motor Vehicles and Motors." Is Hon. Consulting Engineer to the A.C.G.R. & I., and has been a judge of motor vehicles at all the important exhibitions and trials from 1896 to the present time'.

In 1898 Beaumont was president of the Society of Engineers and was a member of the Institution of Civil Engineers, the Institution of Mechanical Engineers and the Institution of Electrical Engineers in addition to many other learned bodies. Beaumont was a member of the Cycle Engineers' Institute and an original member of council of the Institution of Automobile Engineers, taking an active role in the Institution for the rest of his life. In 1906 he became a consulting engineer to Rolls-Royce. His Motor Vehicles and Motors: Their Design, Construction and Working by Steam, Oil and Electricity in two volumes was printed by Archibald Constable & Co. London, comprising Volume 1, 1900 and Volume 2, 1906. Industrial Electric Vehicles and Trucks was published by Griffin in 1920.

From 1926 his offices and those of Mr L. N. Burt were located at 20 Essex Street, Strand, London.

Beaumont's first wife was Ellen Anna Maria Beaumont (1850 – c. 1880), with whom he had three children. His second wife was Mary Elizabeth Weldon (1851–1925), whom he married in 1885 in Lambeth. They had one daughter. He married his third wife, Vida Mary Augusta Constance Moylan (1871–1962), in 1925, the youngest sister of the prolific novelist Josephine Fitzgerald Clarke and the pioneer female dentist Hannah Moylan.

In his later years he lived in West Kensington in London where a neighbour was the author H. Rider Haggard.

William Worby Beaumont died at 46 St George's Road in Westminster in London in April 1929 aged 80 years.
