= Ulrich von Andrian =

German neurologist

- Born: Germany
- Scientific career
- Fields: Medicine, Neurology
- Workplaces: Harvard University; LMU Munich

Ulrich Hans von Andrian is a German immunologist and professor of Microbiology and Immunobiology at Harvard University. He is best known for his work in the areas of leukocyte trafficking and the regulation of immune responses in lymph nodes, with a focus on how T-cell and B-cell-specific responses to antigen are initiated and how antigen is transported to the lymph nodes and presented by APCs.

== Career ==
Von Andrian has worked on uncovering the multi-step adhesion cascades that direct leukocyte subsets from the blood into various tissues in the body. His group has also characterized the dynamics of T-cell interactions with antigen-presenting dendritic cells and identified a critical role for macrophages at the lymph-tissue boundary. This work indicates that these cells participate in the adaptive immune response by “chelating” viral particles in the lymph, and then engaging B cells in the adjacent follicles to trigger B cell activation. His laboratory has also identified a subset of natural killer cells that acquires antigen-specific memory to haptens and viruses.

== Inventions ==
"Bisphosphonates as novel adjuvants to enhance the adaptive immune response"
"Novel target in NK cell mediated antigen specific memory responses"

== See also ==
- Pedram Hamrah
- Lydia Lynch
