= Richard O'Keefe =

New Zealand computer scientist

Richard A. O'Keefe is a computer scientist best known for writing the influential 1990 book on Prolog programming, The Craft of Prolog. He was a lecturer and researcher at the department of computer science at the University of Otago in Dunedin, New Zealand and focuses on programming languages for logic programming and functional programming, including Prolog, Haskell, and Erlang.
