= Frank Ryan (tenor) =

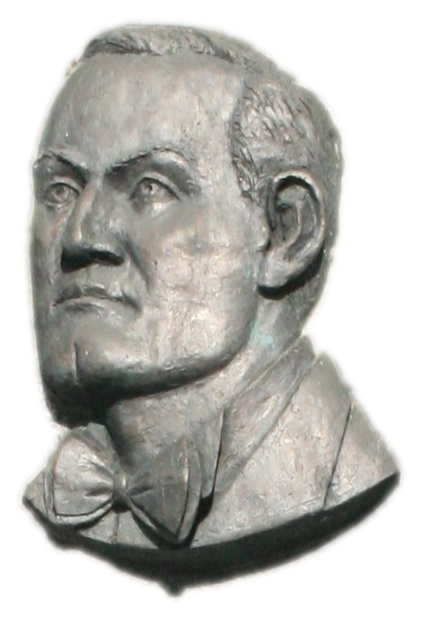
- Plaque of Frank Ryan in Tallow, County Waterford, at St. Patrick's Parish Hall

Background information
- Born: 5 October 1900; Fermoy, County Cork, Ireland
- Died: 17 July 1965 (aged 64) Tallow, County Waterford, Ireland
- Occupation: Singer

Frank Ryan (5 October 1900 – 17 July 1965) was an Irish tenor.

== Biography ==
Ryan was born in Fermoy, County Cork, Ireland in October 1900. His family moved to Tallow, County Waterford, when Frank was six years old, and his parents began a victualing business. His voice developed late, and after it was discovered in his mid-20s that he was a tenor, he won the Tenor Solo award at the Dublin Feis Ceoil in 1931 and the Feis Matthew on four occasions. He joined the Fermoy Choral Society in 1935 and took leading roles in The Gondoliers, Pirates of Penzance, The Geisha, The Yeomen of the Guard, H.M.S. Pinafore, The Mikado, and in later years, Lilac Time.

When Frank Ryan competed for the Joseph O'Mara cup at the Dublin Feis Ceoil in 1938, he was commended by the adjudicator, Topliss Green, for his beautiful yet untrained voice, which Green compared to that of John McCormack.

He turned professional when he joined the Dublin Operatic Society in 1939, and sang leading roles in Faust, Maritana, The Bohemian Girl, Ernani, The Magic Flute, The Lily of Killarney, Martha, Cavalleria rusticana and La bohème. He sang with well-known leading ladies of the time such as Joan Hammond and Marion Studholme. He traveled extensively, appearing in London (Albert Hall, Royal Festival Hall, Seymour Hall), Glasgow, Belgium, Italy, France, Malta, and the United States. He gave many concerts all over the U.S., including The Royal Academy, Brooklyn, and a full recital in Carnegie Hall, New York City, where he sang 32 songs.

He appeared regularly on Radio Éireann, BBC and RTÉ. His last public performance was in Fermoy, County Cork, Ireland on 29 June 1965; he died three weeks later on 17 July 1965, aged 64.
