= Patricia Redlich =

Irish clinical psychologist, journalist, broadcaster and trade unionist (1940-2011)

- Redlich in 1988
- Born: Patricia Cribbon; 1 December 1940
- Died: 30 August 2011 (aged 70)
- Education: Humboldt University of Berlin
- Occupations: Journalist; Broadcaster; Trade unionist; Clinical psychologist
- Political party: Workers' Party

Patricia Redlich (née Cribbon; 1 December 1940 – 30 August 2011) was an Irish clinical psychologist, journalist, broadcaster and trade unionist. An active trade unionist and member of the Workers' Party in the 1970s and 1980s, Redlich frequently spoke of the need for equality for women in the workplace. As a feminist, she rejected more radical elements in the movement and emphasised the need to take a moderate approach to secure legislative changes. In the mid-1980s, she moved away from the ideology of Marxism, pre-empting the fall of the Soviet Union and the rapid decline of communist parties across Europe, including the Workers' Party, that occurred at the end of the decade. Following her retirement from the Eastern Health Board in 1985, Redlich worked primarily in journalism and broadcasting, becoming a contributor to both national newspapers and RTÉ and BBC broadcasts. From the 1990s onwards, Redlich was popular as an agony aunt, with her column in the Sunday Independent considered to be one of the paper's most popular columns.

== Early life ==
Patricia Cribbon was born in Donnycarney on Dublin's Northside in 1940. In the 1960s, Cribbon spent a year in a tuberculosis sanatorium in her late teens before departing to East Germany, where she studied Freudian psychology at the Humboldt University of Berlin in East Berlin. It was while there that she met and married Dieter Redlich, a member of the East German Communist Party. At some point a few years later, Patricia and Dieter amicably divorced; Patricia would continue to use the surname Redlich for the rest of her life. Following the divorce, Patricia returned to Dublin with her adopted son.

== Psychology and trade union work (1970s–1980s) ==
From 1975 onwards, Redlich began working as a clinical psychologist around Dublin. In a December 1975 lecture broadcast on RTÉ Radio, Redlich argued that Irish women were being atomised and isolated by the development of new suburbs around the city, which split up extended families and the support that comes with those. Redlich's analysis drew on the work of Conrad Arensberg and Solon Kimball. It was also in this period that Redlich rejected second-wave feminism on the basis, she felt, that it was declaring "open war on men". Instead of fighting a gender war, Redlich argued that feminist groups needed to seek legal reforms in favour of women to truly advance their cause. She also argued that education, childcare facilities and marriage counselling services were solutions to the problem.

In the late 1970s, Redlich was a leading member of the Ireland–GDR Friendship Society, and the Workers' Party frequently looked to her to try and develop relations between their party and Eastern Bloc nations and their communist parties. In December 1979, a play written by Redlich was performed at the Project Arts Centre in Dublin entitled The Rosenbergs. The play dramatised the lives of Julius and Ethel Rosenberg, who were arrested, tried and executed for treason in 1953 in the United States after being found to be Soviet spies.

It was also in the 1970s that Redlich joined the Association of Scientific, Technical and Managerial Staffs trade union, and quickly advanced from being a shop steward and branch chairperson to becoming the union's education officer and a member of its executive. As a trade unionist, Redlich argued that a lack of childcare facilities contributed to a lack of women in trade unions. In the early 1980s, she became secretary of the women's advisory committee of the Irish Congress of Trade Unions and in that role advocated for greater protection of women in the workplace, in line with European Union laws. Redlich also called for tax reform that would treat women more equally.

Redlich also campaigned on social issues, calling for the legalisation of contraceptives and divorce in Ireland; during the 1985 ICTU women's conference, Redlich argued that "if catholic bishops wished to run the country, they should seek election". Redlich also used her time as a trade unionist to prevent relationships between the "Provisionals" ("Provisional" Sinn Féin and the Provisional IRA) and the trade unions as part of the wider feud between the Provisionals and the "Officials" ("Official Sinn Féin", which became "Sinn Féin the Workers' Party" in 1978 and simply "the Workers' Party" in 1982).

== Journalist and broadcaster (1980s–2011) ==
Redlich began her career in journalism and broadcasting through her involvement in the Workers' Party, and specifically her relationship with Workers' Party member Eoghan Harris. In 1979, Redlich became a presenter for the RTÉ Television series Positively Healthy and in 1982 became a researcher for the RTE series Talking Heads, both of which discussed mental health and both of which were produced by Harris.

In the early 1980s, Redlich made contributions to the women's magazine Women's View and Image magazine, whose editor was Anne Harris, wife of Eoghan Harris. In 1985, Redlich followed Eoghan Harris into occasional employment at the Sunday Independent, and subsequently gave up her work at the Eastern Health Board. Instead, she created a highly profitable premium-rate phone line which offered pre-recorded advice on personal problems.

By the mid-1980s, Redlich had a crisis of ideological faith; She began to move rapidly away from Marxism and socialism. In a 2011 interview, Redlich suggested that her ideological shift stemmed from her belief that Marxism lacked an emphasis on individual responsibility. She also claimed that the excessive even-handedness found in Marxism inevitably leads to hand-wringing. Redlich's abandonment of Marxism foreshadowed many in the Workers' Party who also turned away from the ideology following the collapse of the Soviet Union.

In 1988, Redlich became a presenter of the BBC television health series An Apple a Day... as well as a staff member of The Irish Press, where she began writing a popular advice column. The success of the column would see her become a full-time staff member of the Sunday Independent in 1989, where she began an agony aunt column as well as frequently writing opinion pieces.

In 1996, Redlich was appointed to the RTÉ Board by Taoiseach John Bruton, a move which has been suggested to demonstrate the increasing closeness of former Workers' Party members such as Redlich and Harris to Fine Gael at the time. Harris and Redlich would go on to provide media training to members of Fine Gael over the decade.

In addition to her newspaper columns, Redlich would become a frequent guest on RTÉ Radio from the mid-1990s until she died in 2011.

== Personal life ==
Redlich was married three times; first to Dieter Redlich in the 1960s, secondly to Brian Brennan in 1986, and thirdly to Val Rossiter in 1999. She had one son from the time of her first marriage.

Redlich died of cancer in her own home in 2011. She had planned her funeral, which took place at the Island Crematorium at Ringaskiddy, County Cork, on 2 September 2011.
