= Lydia Lynch =

Immunologist

- Education: University College, Dublin (BSc, PhD)
- Known for: Cancer Metabolism and Obesity
- Scientific career
- Fields: Immunometabolism
- Workplaces: St Vincent's University Hospital; Harvard Medical School; Princeton University; Ludwig Institute for Cancer Research
- Doctoral advisor: Cliona O’Farrelly
- Website: https://thelynchlab.org/

Lydia Lynch is an immunologist who studies the effects of obesity and diet on immune cell functions and cancer. She is a professor in the department of Molecular biology at Princeton University and a Member of the Ludwig Institute for Cancer Research, Princeton Branch.

== Biography ==
Lydia Lynch received her B.Sc. degree in Cell Biology and Genetics from University College Dublin, Ireland. She went on to earn her PhD in Immunology in 2008 from the same university after working in the lab of Cliona O’Farrelly in St. Vincent’s University Hospital.

She worked with Donal O’Shea at St. Vincent’s University Hospital in Dublin for her post-doctoral studies and helped establish the Immunology and Obesity Lab, with the goal of coordinating international, collaborative, translational research in obesity and its complications.

For that work, she received a Newman Fellowship, followed by a L'Oréal-UNESCO For Women in Science Fellowship in 2009, and she moved to Harvard Medical School in Boston to study iNKT cells in adipose tissue in the lab of Mark Exley. In 2009, Lydia received an International Marie Curie Fellowship to continue her postdoctoral studies in immunometabolism, in the labs of Michael Brenner and Ulrich von Andrian at Harvard.

In 2013, she became a member of the junior faculty at Brigham and Women’s Hospital and Harvard Medical School and in 2014, Lydia started her own independent lab which was made possible by a joint appointment between the Division of Endocrinology and the Division of Rheumatology, Allergy and Immunology, at Brigham and Women’s Hospital and Harvard Medical School. There, she led a research group studying how the immune system regulates metabolism and body weight, with a particular focus on immune responses in adipose tissue in mice and humans.

In 2022, Lynch was the recipient of the John R. Kettman Award for Excellence in Cytokine and Interferon Research, which was given by the International Cytokine and Interferon Society, saying "Lynch’s research has the potential to provide insight into the impact of obesity and diet on cancer immunotherapy, as well as the mechanisms underlying the increased risk of immune-related disorders associated with obesity."

In January 2024, Lynch joined Princeton University as a professor in the Department of Molecular Biology and a Member of the Princeton Branch of the Ludwig Institute for Cancer Research. She continues her research on the interplay between obesity, metabolism, the immune system, and cancer.

== Recent Research ==
Lynch's research has continued to examine how fat metabolism affects the immune system. A 2024 paper in Nature showed that a specific type of immune cell found in fat tissue, called a γδ T cell, follows a daily biological rhythm, and that this rhythm is needed for normal fat production and metabolism in the body. A 2025 paper in Science Immunology found that immune cells called natural killer cells, which normally help destroy cancer cells, are disabled by fats present in fluid that accumulates in the abdomen of patients with ovarian cancer, and identified a protein called SCARB1 as responsible for this effect and as a possible treatment target. Also in 2025, a Nature Metabolism paper showed that in obese mice, the type of fat consumed in the diet, rather than the amount, determines how well the immune system can fight tumours, with diets based on animal fats impairing the function of immune cells in the tumour.

== Selected publications ==
- Lynch, Lydia, Donal O'Shea, Desmond C. Winter, Justin Geoghegan, Derek G. Doherty, and Cliona O'Farrelly. "Invariant NKT cells and CD1d+ cells amass in human omentum and are depleted in patients with cancer and obesity." European journal of immunology 39, no. 7 (2009): 1893-1901.
- Lynch, Lydia, Xavier Michelet, Sai Zhang, Patrick J. Brennan, Ashley Moseman, Chantel Lester, Gurdyal Besra et al. "Regulatory i NKT cells lack expression of the transcription factor PLZF and control the homeostasis of Treg cells and macrophages in adipose tissue." Nature immunology 16, no. 1 (2015): 85-95.
- Lynch, Lydia, Andrew E. Hogan, Danielle Duquette, Chantel Lester, Alexander Banks, Katherine LeClair, David E. Cohen et al. "iNKT cells induce FGF21 for thermogenesis and are required for maximal weight loss in GLP1 therapy." Cell metabolism 24, no. 3 (2016): 510-519.
- Kunkemoeller, Britta, Hannah Prendeville, Claire McIntyre, Ayantu Temesgen, Rόisín M. Loftus, Conghui Yao, Lydia Dyck, Linda V. Sinclair, Christina Rollings, Aaron Douglas, Gerard Pernes, Kathleen A. J. Mitchelson, Cathal Harmon, Mathilde Raverdeau, Ross Ward, Harry Kane, Jaclyn Kline, Katie L. O’Brien, Martin Brennan, Frances Smith, Brenneth Stevens, Helen M. Roche, Ed C. Lavelle, David K. Finlay, and Lydia Lynch. "The source of dietary fat influences anti-tumour immunity in obese mice." Nature Metabolism 7 (2025): 1630–1645.
