= Christine Loscher =

Irish biotechnologist

Christine E. Loscher
- Education: Dublin Institute of Technology; National University of Ireland
- Known for: Immunology
- Scientific career
- Workplaces: Dublin City University; Trinity College Dublin

Christine E. Loscher is a Professor of Biotechnology and Associate Dean for Research at Dublin City University. Loscher is director of the Health Technologies Research and Enterprise Hub, and she works on bioactive molecules for autoimmune diseases.

== Early life and education ==
During her undergraduate studies at the Dublin Institute of Technology, Loscher worked with Cliona O’Farrelly at St. Vincent's University Hospital. Loscher earned her PhD at the National University of Ireland in 2000. Following her graduate studies, Loscher joined Trinity College Dublin as a postdoctoral researcher. She worked with Kingston Mills on how vaccines can trigger fevers. In 2003 she was appointed to the St. James's Hospital Institute of Molecular Medicine.

== Career ==
Loscher joined Dublin City University in 2005. She established the Immunomodulation Research Group with Helen Roche. She also directs the Nano-Bioanalytical Research Facility. She looks at how modulating the immune response can improve health, developing new anti-inflammatory compounds for the pharmaceutical and food industry. She investigates bioactive molecules in marine mash. Whilst the immune system may be best known for fighting disease, it is sometimes triggered into chronic inflammation. She has described her work to the Irish Independent.

She served as Principal Investigator for the research consortium Food for Health Ireland, an organisation that partners academics with Irish dairy and ingredient companies. She has worked with Teagasc to identify ingredients that can help lactose intolerance infants. She discovered how the immune system responds to Clostridioides difficile - outer proteins trigger immune responses. Loscher serves on the Irish Society of Immunology.

=== Public engagement ===
Loscher runs ResearchFest, a strand of InspireFest, where researchers give short talks about their work. In 2016 she announced that Dublin City University would name half of its buildings after inspirational women. She contributed to the Royal Society of Chemistry Innate Immunology Summit. She was selected by Silicon Republic as one of the Women Invent Tomorrow in 204 and Top 100 Women in Science in 2016. She delivered a TED Talk on the Future of Food. In 2018 she was included by Silicon Republic in a list of 22 "high-flying scientists".
