= Katherine Purdon =

Irish novelist and playwright

- Born: Catherine Frances Purdon; 1852; Enfield, County Meath, Ireland
- Died: 23 June 1920; Innfield, County Meath, Ireland
- Other name: K.F Purdon
- Occupation: writer

Katherine Frances Purdon (1852– 23 June 1920) was an Irish novelist and playwright, part of the Irish Revival movement and a member of the United Irishwomen.

== Biography ==
Born in Hotwell, Enfield, County Meath, to a farming background, Purdon was educated in school in England and Alexandra College in Dublin.

Purdon was a regular contributor to both Irish and English periodicals beginning with Irish Homestead. She wrote stories which were also produced at the Abbey Theatre. Some of her works were illustrated by Jack B. Yeats and George Russell commented that she wrote perfect English. Purdon was one of only eleven women to have a play produced at the Abbey during that period. She is described in a review of the day as a new and talented author and there are reviews of her work from London through Jamaica to the New York Times.

Purdon had an interest in the Irish Language movement and was in contact with noted activists like Thomas MacDonagh. However, by her own admission she only had a few words of Irish. Purdon was part of the Irish Revival movement through her representation of the people of Meath and their language and customs. Purdon was one of the founding members of the Irish Countrywomen's Association under its original name of the United Irishwomen.

== Works ==
- The last days of Lord Edward (Smith, Elder and Co, 1898)
- The laundry at home (Wells Gardner, Darton & Company, 1902)
- The Fortunes of Flot: A Dog Story, Mainly Fact (Thomas Nelson and sons, 1911)
- Christina Divelly: a story (1911)
- Candle and Crib (Dublin: Maunsel 1914)
- The Folk of Furry Farm (London: Nisbet 1914)
- Dinny of the Doorstep (Dublin: Talbot Press 1918)
- Spanish lily or only an ass (Dublin: Talbot Press 1921)
- Kevin and the Cats, etc. (London: S.P.C.K. 1921)
