= Finghin O Mathghamhna =

15th century Irish clan leader and scribe

Finghin Ó Mathghamhna (English: (O') Mahony) (died 1496) was an Irish clan leader and literary scribe.

A local lord from Fonn Iartharhach in south-west County Cork. In 1475 he produced an Irish translation of The Buke of John Manderville for whomsoever would fain know the best way to wend from every country to Jerusalem and the holy places that are there about. It survives in three manuscripts:

- Rennes, Bibliothèque Municipale 598, ff.52a2–68b2;
- British Library, Egerton 1781, ff.129a–146b
- London, British Library, Additional 33,993, ff. 6a–7a (fragment).

The Annals of the Four Masters note his death in 1496, calling him "saoi eccnaidhe illaidin agust i mBerla/a wise man, learned in the Latin and English languages."

== Sources ==
- 'The Gaelic Abridgement of the Book of Ser Marco Polo', Z.C.P., i, 1897, Whitley Strokes, pp. 245–73, 362-438, 603.
- The Gaelic Maundeville, Z.C.P., ii, 1898, Whitley Strokes, pp. 1–63.
