= Philip Flattisbury =

Philip Flattisbury (fl. 1500), was an Irish compiler.

Flattisbury was from a prominent Irish family: members of the family, from the thirteenth century, held important positions as landowners in County Kildare, and occasionally filled legal offices under the English government there. Flattisbury appears to have been a retainer of Gearóid Mór FitzGerald, 8th Earl of Kildare, deputy-governor of Ireland under Henry VII and Henry VIII. In 1503 Flattisbury made for FitzGerald a compilation styled the Red Book of the Earls of Kildare. This volume consists mainly of documents connected with or bearing upon the lands and possessions of the Geraldine house of Kildare. This volume was sought for eagerly, but in vain, by the governmental agents at the time of the attainder of the heads of the house of Kildare in 1537. Formerly in the possession of the Duke of Leinster, the original manuscript was bought by Trinity College, Dublin in 1984, and has been edited by Gearóid MacNiocaill.

Flattisbury also transcribed for Gerald FitzGerald, 9th Earl of Kildare, in 1517, a collection of Anglo-Irish annals in Latin, terminating in 1370 (linked by the DNB to the chronicles of John Pembridge). To them, he appended a few lines of additional matter at the end, with a brief panegyric on the Earl of Kildare. The manuscript bears the following title: Hic inferius sequuntur diversæ Cronicæ ad requisitionem nobilis et præpotentis domini, Geraldi filii Geraldi, deputati domini regis Hiberniæ, scriptæ per Philippum Flattisbury de Johnston juxta le Naas, anno Domini mdxvii. et anno regni Henrici Octavi ix. Edmund Campion, in his History of Ireland, written in 1571, and Richard Stanihurst, somewhat later, referred erroneously to Flattisbury as the author of the annals of which he was the transcriber. Stanihurst did not record the date of Flattisbury's death, but mentioned that it took place ‘at his town styled Johnstown,’ near Naas, in Kildare, and observes that he was a ‘worthy gentleman and a diligent antiquary.’ The original annals, from which Flattisbury transcribed, were printed for the first time in 1607 by William Camden, in his Britannia, from a manuscript lent to him by Lord Howard of Naworth Castle, and subsequently presented by Archbishop Laud to the Bodleian Library, where it is now preserved. A new edition from the manuscript used by Camden, and collated with fragments of an older one unknown to him, was published by John Thomas Gilbert, Flattisbury's DNB biographer, in the appendix to the Chartularies of St. Mary's Abbey, Dublin, Rolls Series, 1885.
