= Hannah Moylan =

First Irish woman to gain a bachelors degree in Science

Hannah Alexandra Moylan
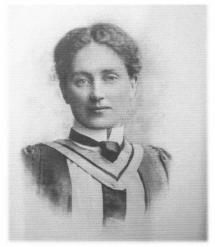
- Hannah Moylan wearing Graduation Robes at Alexandra College in 1897
- Born: 1867; Galway
- Died: 15 June 1902 (aged 34–35); Cairo
- Education: BSc
- Alma mater: Alexandra College
- Known for: Educationist with bachelor of science degree

Hannah Alexandra Moylan (1867 – 15 June 1902) was the first woman to get a degree in science in Ireland.

== Early life and education ==
Born Hannah Moylan of the Newcastle Road, Galway to Jeremiah Moylan and Mary Fitzgerald of Cork. Her mother was the matron and her father the headmaster of the Model school. Her father went on to become a Barrington Lecturer on Political Economy. Moylan was baptised on 2 December 1867, her exact date of birth is unknown. She was their second youngest child of ten. Her oldest brother Michael became a doctor. Her oldest sister a school governess and the youngest sister Vida Mary Augusta Constance Moylan (1871-1962) married William Worby Beaumont, an engineer and inventor. Her sister Josephine was a novelist who wrote under the name Errol Fitzgerald. In 1873 the family moved to Limerick where they were living when her mother died. Moylan got her primary education from her father but went to Madame De Prins College for Young Ladies and the Ladies Intermediate School on Catherine Street in Limerick for her secondary education. She won prizes in her examinations while in school.

In July 1887 she matriculated at the Royal University of Ireland where she studied the Arts. At the time it was not possible for a young woman to attend university directly and so Moylan got her university education from Alexandra College, Dublin and qualified with a BA in French, English and Mathematics in 1891. She won scholarships and awards during the period where she took her university exams through Trinity College Dublin.

== Career ==
Moylan took up a teaching position in Alexandria College from which she took a break in 1895 to study for a BSc through Queen's University Galway. Moylan was the first woman student to get this degree in Ireland. The next woman to do this was Jane Stephens in 1903. Once she had the second degree, Moylan returned to Alexandra College where she remained a lecturer. She was an activist in promoting women's education. Moylan was part of the Central Association of Irish Schoolmistresses working to get permission for women to be admitted to Trinity College Dublin. Even while in college herself she wrote papers for journals, mostly in mathematics. Moylan also worked on the need for training for secondary teachers in Ireland and on methods of teaching mathematics. Moylan was a founding member of the Alexandra College Guild, a philanthropic organisation of current and past members of the college. This established the Alexandra College Guild Tenement Company created to improve housing conditions in Dublin. Moylan was a director of the company.

By 1900 Moylan was studying for the Oxford University exams on the theory, history and practice of education. When she was finished this she took up a position in Saniah Girls School in Cairo. She left Europe to start the next term in October 1901. However Moylan contracted typhoid fever in June 1902. She was expected to recover but died in the British Nursing Home in the Ismailia Quarter of Cairo on 15 June 1902.

Moylan was buried in Cairo. At the time she was still the only woman BSc of the Royal University of Ireland.
