= Frankie Fullen =

Irish footballer

Frankie Fullen was an Irish soccer player who played in the League of Ireland during the 1930s and 1940s.

Fullen played for the Bohemian Football Club amongst others during his career in the League of Ireland. He was top scorer for Bohs in 1937/38 with 22 goals in all competitions from only 21 games.
