= Josephine Fitzgerald Clarke =

Prolific Irish romance novelist

Lady Josephine Fitzgerald Clarke
- Born: Bridget Josephine Moylan; 1865; Ireland
- Died: June 6, 1953
- Spouse: Sir Frederick William Alfred Clarke (m. 1893; died 1927)
- Children: Eric Fitzgerald Clarke (1894-1917); Desmond Frederick Aubrey Clarke (1896-1984); Gerald Wilfred Francis Clarke (1899-1918); Philip Edward Joseph Clarke (1907-1973)
- Parent(s): Jeremiah Moylan (father), Mary Fitzgerald of Cork (mother)
- Relatives: Michael Moylan (brother); Hannah Moylan (sister); Vida Mary Augusta Constance Moylan (sister); William Worby Beaumont (brother-in-law)
- Writing career
- Pen name: Errol Fitzgerald
- Genre: Romantic fiction

Josephine Fitzgerald Clarke (pen name, Errol Fitzgerald; 1865 – 6 June 1953), was a prolific Irish romance novelist who published over 40 novels for Mills & Boon between 1927 and 1953.

== Biography ==
Born Bridget Josephine Moylan to Jeremiah Moylan and Mary Fitzgerald of Cork, her mother was the matron and her father the headmaster of the Model School. Her father went on to become a Barrington Lecturer on Political Economy. She was one of ten children. Her oldest brother Michael became a doctor; her oldest sister a school governess and the youngest sister Vida Mary Augusta Constance Moylan (1871-1962) married William Worby Beaumont, an engineer and inventor. Her sister Hannah became the first woman to get a degree in Science in Ireland. In 1873 the family moved to Limerick where they were living when her mother died.

Clarke move to England where she went by Josephine Fitzgerald Moylan. In 1893 she became Lady Josephine Fitzgerald Clarke when she married Sir Frederick William Alfred Clarke (1857-1927), Accountant and Comptroller-General of HM Customs and Excise. Their children were: Eric Fitzgerald Clarke (1894-1917); Desmond Frederick Aubrey Clarke (1896-1984); Gerald Wilfred Francis Clarke (1899-1918), and Philip Edward Joseph Clarke (1907-1973). After her husband died in 1927, Clarke began writing romantic novels under the nom de plume Errol Fitzgerald. She published over 40 novels in the next twenty years.

In her later years she lived in Bedford Park in Chiswick.

== Bibliography ==
- Harvests Of Deceit, 1929
- Jewels Of The Dark, 1929
- The Purple Stone, 1930
- Dear Hatred, 1930
- Storms Of Fate, 1931
- Gleanings Of Passion, 1932
- Kinsman For A Night, 1932
- The Path Of Chance, 1932
- The Spur Of Impulse, 1933
- Ungenerous Heart, 1933
- The Whispering Witness, 1934
- Converging Shadows, 1934
- Love Lies Deep, 1935
- Love In Chains, 1935
- Truth Is Whispered, 1936
- Arrows Of Chance, 1936
- The Nailed Door, 1937
- Storms At Sunset, 1937
- Doubly Deceived, 1938
- The Faithful Knave, 1938
- Errant Wife, 1938
- Hasty Repentance, 1939
- Love Has Eyes, 1939
- Tide Of Destiny, 1939
- Splendid Hope, 1940
- Prisoners Of Love, 1940
- A Fatal Name, 1941
- Flight From Marriage, 1941
- Ambition's Fool, 1942
- The Hidden Heiress, 1942
- Forbidden Flame, 1943
- The Secret Tenant, 1943
- Vengeance Tarries, 1944
- The Emerald Chain, 1946
- A Borrowed Coat, 1947
- Unwanted Daughter, 1947
- A Stranger Intervenes, 1948
- The Price of Silence, 1950
- Beloved Deceiver, 1951
