= Fintan O'Carroll =

Irish composer

Fintan Patrick O'Carroll (Irish: Fiontán Padraig Ó Cearbhaill) was an Irish composer. He was born in Wexford, Ireland on 31 July 1922. His family later moved to Waterford and this is where he spent the rest of his life. He died in July 1981 and was survived by his wife and seven children.

He composed mostly church music for the Roman Catholic Church, and is most well known for his "Celtic Alleluia" which was later re-arranged by Christopher Walker. It was published also with texts in several other languages: Swedish, and French

The Gloria from his Mass of the Annunciation was included in A historical anthology of Irish church music published in 2001, and included in a companion recording. His masses were published in an updated collected edition in 2012, adapted for use with the new Roman Missal.

== Major works ==
- Mass of the Immaculate Conception,
- Responsorial psalms for Sundays and major feast days of the three-year lectionary cycle.
- Aifreann in onóir Muire, Máthair Dé : eagrán do phobal agus/nó cór (Mass in honor of Mary, Mother of God)
- Celtic alleluia : for SATB choir, descant, assembly, organ, guitar, solo instrument, trumpet or clarinet

== Sources ==
- Waterford People: A Biographical Dictionary By T. N. Fewer. Ballylough Books, Callaghane, Co Waterford, ISBN 0-9533704-4-5,
