= Mícheál Ó hEidhin =

Mícheál Ó hEidhin, Irish musician and teacher, and schools inspector of music, Primary/Postprimary born 1938. He died on 29 January 2012.

A native of Derroe-Rossaveel, County Galway, Mícheál Ó hEidhin was born into a musical family. Graduating in science, he studied music at University College Cork under Aloys Fleischmann, choral development with Pilib Ó Laoghaire, worked as a music inspector in Galway VEC, and initiated Comhaltas Ceoltóirí Éireann's teaching diploma in 1980.

He was music director for RTÉ promgrammes Bring down the Lamp and Comortas – Cabaret"In song and in seory", "Comórtas" and an adjudicator for Oireachtas and Slogadh competitions since 1969. He was instrumental in setting up a grades syllabus in traditional music for Comhaltas Ceoltóirí Éireann and the Royal Irish Academy of Music in 1998.

== Publications ==
- Cas Amhran
- Amhran do Cholaisti
- Ceol don Chor
- "Déan Rince"
