= Seosamh Ó Duibhginn =

Irish-language writer

- Born: 1914; County Armagh, Ireland
- Died: 1994
- Occupations: Editor, publisher, writer

Seosamh Ó Duibhginn (1914–1994) was an Irish editor and publisher who wrote mostly in the Irish language. He was a native of County Armagh, Ireland.

== Political life ==
Ó Duibhginn was an Irish Republican and a volunteer in the Irish Republican Army.
