= Christine Frost =

Religious sister

Christine Frost MBE

Personal life
- Born: 1937 (age 88–89) Limerick, Ireland

Religious life
- Religion: Roman Catholic
- Order: Religious sister

Sister Christine Frost MBE (born 1937 in Limerick, Ireland) is a religious sister working and living in Poplar, London. She was awarded the MBE for her work in deprived areas of Tower Hamlets in the shadow of Canary Wharf, where she has been campaigning since the 1980s.

She launched the charity Neighbours in Poplar in 1968, to help older adults meet up and enjoy outings, and later South Poplar and Limehouse Action for Secure Housing (SPLASH), showing similar concern for teenagers. She is known locally for distributing Christmas meals to elderly and lonely people.

In 2010 she led a public protest against rigid restrictions introduced by Tower Hamlets Council in the name of safety following a tower block fire in south London.

On 8 August 2014, Frost removed an emblem resembling the Black Standard from the entrance to a Council estate in Poplar, as the local authority had been slow to react. She explained that the protesters had intended to express solidarity with Gaza, but had been unaware that other residents would be intimidated.
