= Joan O'Reilly =

Irish sprinter and hockey player (1924–2014)

- hall of fame photo
- Born: 17 September 1924; Dublin, Ireland
- Died: 10 January 2014 (aged 89); Stillorgan, Ireland
- Occupations: butcher and international hockey player

Joan Gertrude O'Reilly (17 September 1924 – 10 January 2014) was an Irish athlete, hockey player, umpire and butcher. Discrimination prevented her from competing at the 1948 Olympics but she turned to hockey and gained 34 caps before retiring to administer and umpire matches.

== Life ==
O'Reilly was born in Dublin in 1924. She was one of six children and she was educated at De Loreto College where she took up hockey. However sprinting was her main skill and she would have competed at the 1948 Olympics if Ireland had decided to send qualifying women athletes. The church objected, so the state only sent five women and four of them were artists (art was one of the events). She was able to compete against Olympians at other international events and this showed the quality of her sprinting. In 1949 the Women's Athletic Association of Ireland held its first meeting and O'Reilly won both the 100 and 200 yard races.

Her main job was as a pork butcher in Crumlin. The sister had a nearby drapers and her brother sold beef at the same business.

She turned to hockey and she was part of the Irish team in the 1950s. She appeared in 34 International games that included matches in England, South Africa and the Netherlands. She captained a tour of the USA where they won 22 of their 24 matches. A highlight was competing in 1950 to take the Hockey Triple Crown. The match against England was a historic victory in Belfast - this was the first time Ireland had beaten them since 1908.

== Death and legacy ==
In 2006 she was one of the first players inducted into the Irish Hockey Hall of Fame. O'Reilly died in a nursing home in Stillorgan near Dublin in 2014.
