= Mary McCoy =

Mary McCoy (1820s – 7 October 1899) was an Irish nurse.

McCoy was born in County Limerick in the 1820s. At some point, she emigrated to New York City with members of her family.

Upon the outbreak of the American Civil War in 1861, James McCoy (1826–93) and her three brothers all enlisted in the 71st New York Infantry (later part of the New York Excelsior Brigade). Mary joined the regiment, being appointed an army nurse by Secretary Edwin M. Stanton.

All surviving accounts testify to McCoy's excellence at her post, but her work during the Battle of Fair Oaks was especially distinguished. Her work among the wounded on the firing line moved General George B. McClellan to compliment her bravery.

Shortly after the battle, President Lincoln arrived at Harrison's Landing, and asked Nurse McCoy for a drink. McCoy hesitated to serve the Commander-in-Chief with an ordinary tin cup, and went in search of a glass, but Lincoln called her back, saying "If a tin dipper is good enough for the soldiers, it is good enough for me."

Both McCoy and her husband survived the war. Following his death, she joined the staff of St. Mary's Hospital, Brooklyn. She died there on 7 October 1899, survived by a niece. Her death was marked by obituaries in state papers.
