= Mary Kostka Kirby =

Mary Kostka Kirby (9 July 1863 – 18 August 1952) was a New Zealand catholic nun. She was born in Limerick, County Limerick, Ireland on 9 July 1863.
