= Andrew Slattery =

Irish rally car driver

Andrew Slattery is an Irish rally car driver who won the Novice Award in 2008. He is the 2014 Class 6 / R2 National Tarmac champion, driving a Peugeot 208 R2, supported by Peugeot Ireland, Finol Oils & Slatterys Garage Ltd.

Slattery, service manager at Slattery's Garage Puckane, has competed in 4 rounds of the National Tarmac Championship R2 class this year. He recently picked up 3rd place in class in Galway Summer Stages Rally on 1 September. His Peugeot 208 R2 is sponsored by Total S.A., through Irish Distributor, Finol Oils, whilst Gowan Distributors Limited, Peugeot Importers in Ireland has committed to promotional support to run the car in 2013.

After a break from the sport for 7 years, (2017-2023) Slattery & long standing co driver Shaun Forde have linked up again to campaign a brand new Peugeot 208 Rally4 in the Irish tarmac championship, again fully supported by Peugeot Ireland, Gowan Auto & Slatterys Garage Ltd.
