= Peadar Ó Gealacáin =

Peadar Uí Gealacáin, aka Peter Galligan (17 March 1792 – Feb. 1860) was an Irish scribe and hedge school master.

Of Ballymacane (or Ballymacain) townland in the parish of Moynalty, Kilmainhamwood, Kells, County Meath, Ó Gealacáin was by 1814 a hedge school master, being educated in Irish, English, and mathematics. In 1824 average attendance at his school was thirty-five boys, six girls. He taught reading, writing, arithmetic, geography and Catholic catechism (though himself a member of the Established church).

Ó Gealacáin transcribed Irish manuscripts and collected ancient songs, but his main interest was in mathematics and general literature. His surviving manuscripts were compiled between 1823 and 1858. One, Royal Irish Academy MS. 3.B. 39, contains his genealogy, which reads:

"Peadar, mic Pádraig, mic Lúcais, mic Éadmun, mic ch Seáan, mic uí l Liam, mic Aindriais, mic Pádraig Uí Gealacáin ó leit1omal an Cabán ag Sliab c Cleat o aimsir cogaid Crombail go t tí an t-am so agus cuid dá t treib na c cónaid an sa tír sin fós."

He was also a contributor to several almanacs.

He was married to Jane Tennison, and their children are believed to have included Margaret (fl. 1837) and Peter (fl. 1840). His mother's name was Margaret Williams of Munterconnacht parish, Lough Ramor, who died in 1837. Her sister was a Mary Cunnigan, who died in 1829; her daughter, Anne, died in 1842. All of the family are interred in the graveyard of Munterconnacht, but without any tombstones. Due to clearances and emigration, by the early 20th century many of his relatives and their descendants left the area.

== Sources ==
- The Schools and Scholars of Breiffne, Phillip O Connell, Dublin, 1942
