= Margaret Molloy =

Irish businesswoman

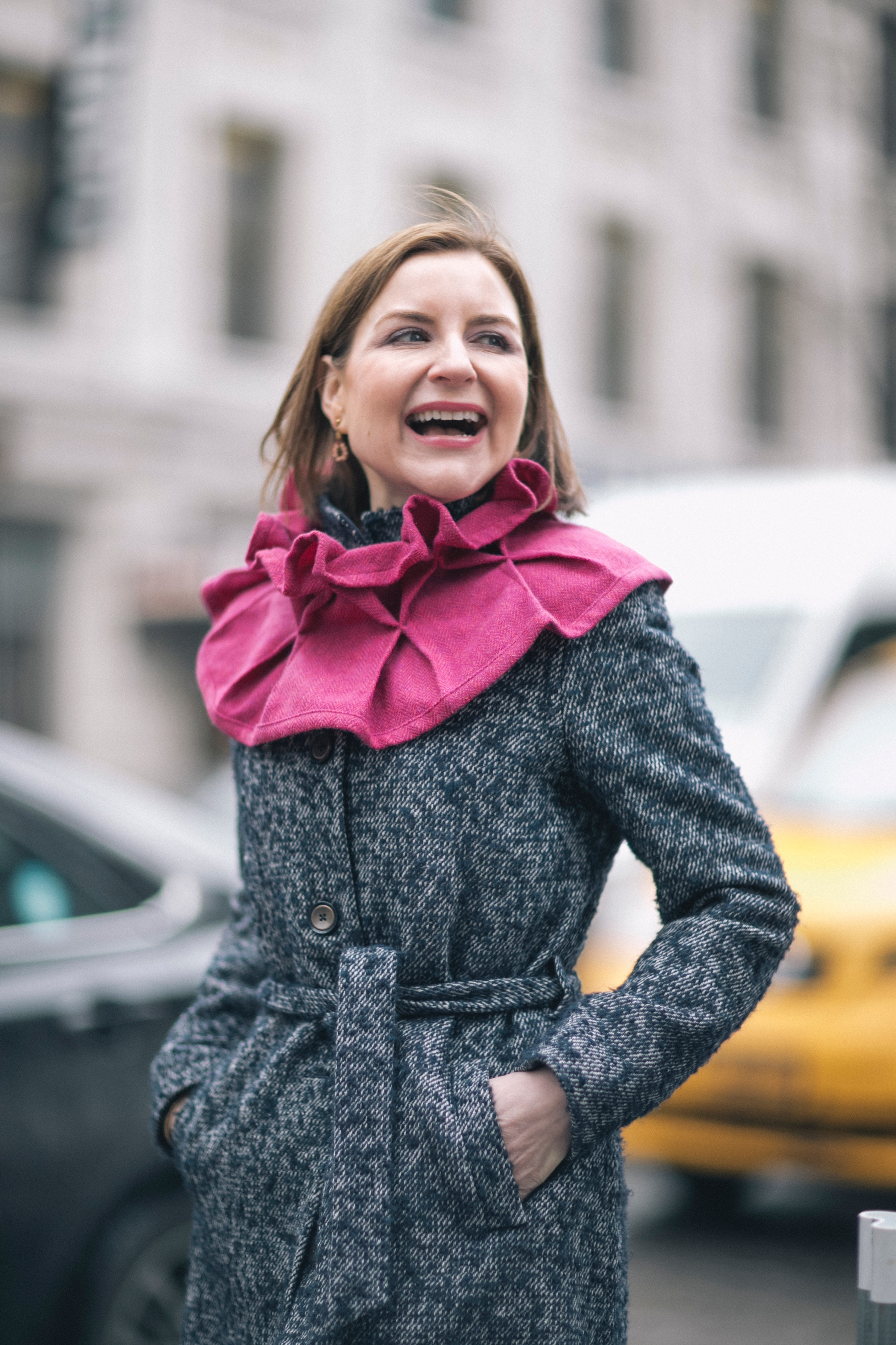
Margaret Molloy

Margaret Molloy is an Irish businesswoman. Based in New York City, she is the chief marketing officer and head of new development at Siegel+Gale, a strategy and design firm. Molloy is a member of Global Irish Network, an advisory group to the Government of Ireland. She was formerly the Board Chairperson for the New York Hub of The Marketing Society, a global community of over 3,000 senior marketers. Molloy is now a board member of the society. In addition to her duties as a board member of The Marketing Society, she serves on the board of directors of ANA Business Marketing NYC and on the board of the Origin Theatre. In 2020, she cofounded Chief, a private network built to drive more women into positions of power and stabilise their careers. Furthermore, she serves as a member of The WIE Suite, a private membership community of women leaders and creatives. Additionally, she is a member of the Wall Street Journal CMO Network.

Molloy has had her work published in the Harvard Business Review and Fast Company. She is also a frequent contributor to LinkedIn and Forbes. Molloy is also the creator of #WearingIrish, a platform that promotes awareness of Irish fashion design.

== Early life and education ==
The eldest of six, Molloy grew up on a dairy farm in Tubber, County Offaly, Ireland. In 1993, she earned a Bachelor of Arts degree in business and Spanish from the Ulster University, Northern Ireland, and La Universidad de Valladolid, Spain. She moved to the United States in 1994, and, in 2000, earned a Master of Business Administration from Harvard Business School. Molloy currently resides in Manhattan with her husband, economist Jim O'Sullivan, and their two sons.

== Career ==
Molloy's first role was with the Irish state-owned agency Enterprise Ireland. She then attended Harvard Business School to complete her MBA. Afterwards, she worked in various marketing and management positions including SVP of Marketing at the professional network Gerson Lehrman Group and leading teams at Siebel Systems (Oracle) where she was a member of the CEO's Circle. In 2013, she was appointed chief marketing officer and head of business development at Siegel+Gale.

== #WearingIrish ==
In early 2016, Molloy launched #WearingIrish to promote Irish fashion by inviting friends to wear garments or accessories by Irish designers during March, and to post their photos on social media using the hashtag #WearingIrish. The platform exposes Ireland's talented fashion designers to new markets, showcasing the originality and skill of Irish design on the global stage. Molloy states, "As a marketer, I am fascinated by the possibilities that social media provides for ordinary citizens to show their support for brands and causes. Connecting all three interests — fashion, marketing, and Irish heritage — I saw an opportunity for people to come together on social media to support Irish designers." In 2019, Molloy and #WearingIrish were featured in a Nationwide special on RTÉ One, Ireland's most watched TV channel.

Some of the brands selected to participate in Wearing Irish: Aine, Triona, Dubarry, Helen Steele.

== Awards and honours ==
Molloy received the 2017 B2B Marketer of the Year award (The Drum). Molloy was also listed by Richtopia as one of the Top 100 Chief Marketing Officers internationally. In November 2019, she was honoured by the Douglas Hyde Foundation.
