= Cliona O'Farrelly =

Irish immunologist

Cliona O’Farrelly is an Irish immunologist, with a background in comparative, liver and cancer immunology, focuses on the innate immune response to viruses to identify new or improved therapeutic strategies to control resistance to viral infection.

== Biography ==
As a child living in Adare, County Limerick, Ireland, O’Farrelly hoped to study architecture at Trinity College, but because that major wasn't offered at the college, chose science instead and earned her BS and PhD in immunology. There, she was once taught by physicist and Nobel laureate Ernest Walton.

After her studies, she spent almost three years as a lecturer and researcher at Harvard University followed by three years at Trinity College Dublin. In 1993, she began working at University College Dublin's St. Vincent's University Hospital (SVUH) where she directed research (such as with Christine Loscher) and supervised the PhD studies of immunologist Lydia Lynch, among others. In 2007, O’Farrelly joined the faculty at Trinity College where, she was named Professor of Comparative Immunology at the Trinity Biomedical Sciences Institute with a leading role in finding immune response therapies for viruses, including COVID-19.

She has conducted collaborations with National Liver Centre SVUH, National Fertility Clinic, Holles Street Hospital, Cancer Institute at Trinity College Dublin, along with international research at MIT, Harvard University, Pasteur Institute and Moffite Cancer Center in Florida. She also develops industry relevant training opportunities for students.

In 2022, O’Farrelly was named a Fellow of the American Association for the Advancement of Science. Candidates are elected to these lifetime positions for their scientifically and socially distinguished achievements throughout their careers.

== Selected publications ==
According to Scopus, O'Farrelly has more than 279 publications as of 2023.

- O'Farrelly, Cliona, J. Kelly, W. I. J. M. Hekkens, B. Bradley, A. Thompson, C. Feighery, and D. G. Weir. "Alpha gliadin antibody levels: a serological test for coeliac disease." Br Med J (Clin Res Ed) 286, no. 6383 (1983): 2007–2010.
- Doherty, Derek G., and Cliona O'Farrelly. "Innate and adaptive lymphoid cells in the human liver." Immunological reviews 174 (2000): 5-20.
- Dunne, Jean, Sara Lynch, Cliona O’Farrelly, Stephen Todryk, John E. Hegarty, Conleth Feighery, and Derek G. Doherty. "Selective expansion and partial activation of human NK cells and NK receptor-positive T cells by IL-2 and IL-15." The Journal of Immunology 167, no. 6 (2001): 3129–3138.
- Nemeth, Eszter, Alan W. Baird, and Cliona O’Farrelly. "Microanatomy of the liver immune system." In Seminars in immunopathology, vol. 31, pp. 333–343. Springer-Verlag, 2009.

== Selected awards and honors ==
- Honorary secretary of Amnesty International.
- 1997: Fellow of the Royal Academy of Medicine in Ireland
- 2001-2007: President, Irish Society of Immunology
- 2008: Irish Society of Immunology Public Lecture Award
- 2008: Professorial fellowship of Trinity College Dublin
- 2022: Fellow of the American Association for the Advancement of Science
