= Anthony Holten =

Irish author (1945–2020)

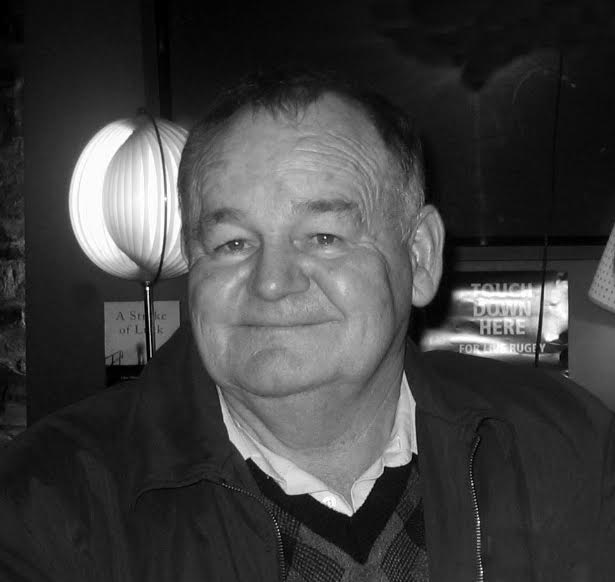
- Anthony Holten in 2007 at A Stroke of Luck book launch.
- Other names: Tony Holten, Anthony Holton, Tony Holton (Note: Sometimes credited with the nickname "Tony" or with the surname misspelled as "Holton" instead of Holten.)
- Occupation: Author

Anthony "Tony" Holten (3 May 1945 – 11 September 2020) was an Irish author, historian, stroke advocate, former mechanic and marine engineer.

== Early days ==
He was born in Dowdstown, Navan in 1945. He started an apprenticeship in Navan Engineering Works as a mechanic over six years. He was a Navan Road Club member in the mid-1960s, competing in the Rás Tailteann cycling race four times. He was a member of the town's winning team in The 1968 Waller Cup Race. In 1967, he was awarded the Henry Ford Award for Merit.

== Seafaring career and later career ==
In 1969, he began a career as an engineer on deep sea tankers for Shell Oil Company. Over the next ten years, he travelled extensively during his marine engineering days in the Merchant Navy prior to continuing his career working on offshore oil and gas fields worldwide.

He worked for Marathon Petroleum in the 1980s, primarily on the Kinsale Head gas field. He and his family moved to Jakarta, Indonesia in the mid-1980s for his work as a marine engineer on the company's new Kakap oil and gas field on the South China Sea. When he returned to Ireland, he was based in Marathon's head office in Cork, until a stroke forced him to retire in 1999.

== Retirement and writing career ==
After suffering a stroke at the age of fifty-four, he initially lost the use of his right arm and leg and had to re-learn to use them. After a long period of rehabilitation, he began work on his first book, entitled A Stroke of Luck, about his experience and his dealings with the Irish Health System. The book was published by Nonsuch Ireland (an imprint of The History Press) in 2007. Books Ireland called it a "funny, inspiring and telling account" and a "disturbing insight into the Irish health system".

He was also the author of several in-depth history books, primarily focusing on roads (including old toll roads and road networks) and rivers in County Meath including On Ancient Roads about the road network around Tara and Where Toll Roads Meet, the latter of which gained some controversy and extra attention as it was partially about the M3 Controversy. This led to an incident at the book launch in Navan Library as then Irish Minister Noel Dempsey attended to give a speech about Holten and his book, and clashed with protestors who attempted to present a pig's head to the Minister.

In addition to his books, he also frequently contributed pieces to other publications, usually on Irish history.

Holten's other books include From High Kings To Seakings about his time with Shell, Of Other Days about his childhood, and The River Boyne about the river of the same name, the latter book becoming very popular in County Meath and among Irish historians nationwide, with journalist Paul Clements remarking in The Irish Times that it "invoked the work of Sir William Wilde" and that Holten was a "pontist extraordinaire". Holten regularly gave talks about his books and local history.

== Stroke advocacy ==
In addition to being an author, he was an advocate for stroke survivors and chairman of the Cork Stroke Support Group, often giving talks at medical conferences, hospitals, and universities, and was the recipient of the Irish Heart Foundation's "Life after Stroke Awards" Boehringer Ingelheim Stroke Champion Award in 2013.

== Bibliography ==
=== Books ===
- A Stroke of Luck: One Man's Struggle with Diabetes and the Irish Medical System (Nonsuch/The History Press, 2007) (ISBN 9781845885953)
- Where Toll Roads Meet: Exploring the Road Network Around Tara from Olden Times to the Current M3 Controversy (ISBN 9781905451760)
- On Ancient Roads: Recollections, History and Folklore of County Meath (ISBN 9780956991102)
- From High Kings to Seakings: A Tale of Three Ships and the Landlubber Who Went To Sea (ISBN 9781291704242)
- Of Other Days: Recollections of an Irish Country Childhood (1945–1955) (ISBN 9781291705348)
- The River Boyne: Hidden Legacies, History and Lore Explored on Foot and by Boat (ISBN 9780956991119)

=== Essays and articles ===
- "Echoes Along the Boyne – Rediscovering the Stackallen Lighters" (in Navan – its People and its Past, Vol. 2)
- "The Great Weir of Navan and the Boyne Mills" (in Navan – its People and its Past, Vol. 3)
- "A Milestone in Navan" (Navan Historical Society)
