= 2013 in Ireland =

- Centuries: 19th; 20th; 21st
- Decades: 1990s; 2000s; 2010s; 2020s
- See also: 2013 in Northern Ireland; Other events of 2013; List of years in Ireland

Events during the year 2013 in Ireland.

== Incumbents ==
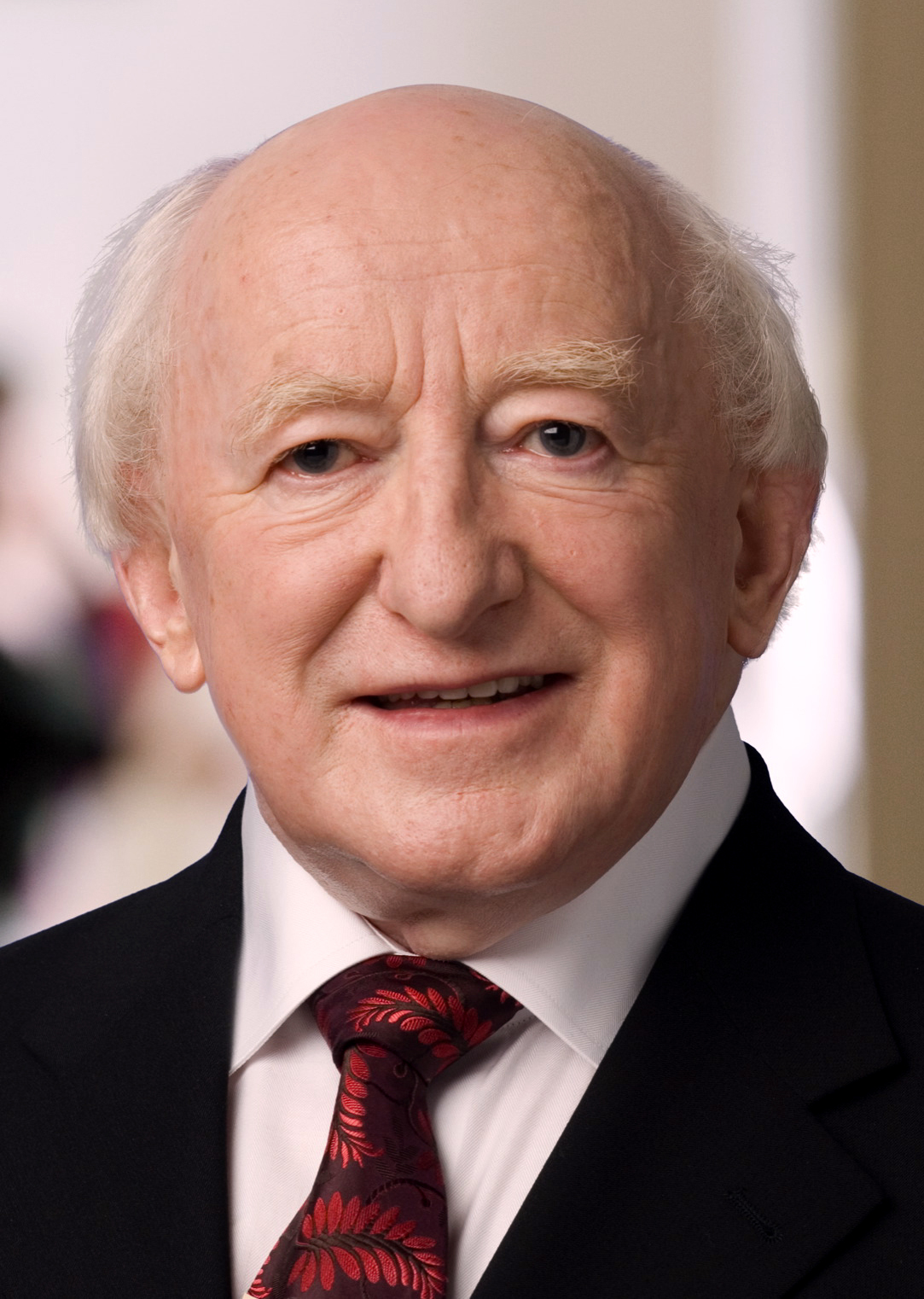
President Michael D. Higgins

- President: Michael D. Higgins
- Taoiseach: Enda Kenny (FG)
- Tánaiste: Eamon Gilmore (Lab)
- Minister for Finance: Michael Noonan (FG)
- Chief Justice: Susan Denham
- Dáil: 31st
- Seanad: 24th

== Events ==
=== January ===
- 14 January – A couple, including a former nurse, were found huddled together on the bedroom floor of a flat owned by Dublin City Council, having been dead for days. They died from hypothermia.
- 14 January – Music retailer HMV went out of business and thousands of people lost their jobs, including 300 in Ireland.
- 15 January – A Dublin grandfather challenged HMV's administrators by leaving the Henry Street branch of the shop with three computer games when staff refused to accept a €40 HMV gift voucher he bought his grandson for Christmas.
- 15 January – The Food Safety Authority of Ireland confirmed the presence of horse DNA in beef burger products on sale in supermarkets. At least ten million burgers were withdrawn from sale.
- 16 January – Former Fianna Fáil politician Pat Melia was fined €500 after pleading guilty to the false claiming of expenses in April 2012.
- 28 January – Protesters against the household tax occupied a public gallery in Cork; Cork City Council abandoned a meeting.
- 28 January – Flash flooding occurred in central Galway. Elsewhere in the country, flooding occurred in Killarney and between Letterkenny and Stranorlar.
- 29 January – Two people were killed by the collapse of an internal wall at a garden centre in Longford.
- 31 January – The High Court ruled that businessman David Hall did not have the legal standing to challenge the State's use of promissory notes to bail out Anglo Irish Bank and other financial institutions, though the ruling allowed for the case to be brought by a member of the Dáil.

=== February ===
- 5 February – A report into Ireland's Magdalene asylums found "significant" state collusion in the admission of thousands of "fallen women" into the institutions where they were abused and worked for nothing in conditions of slavery before they were shut down nearly two decades ago.
- 6–7 February – The Irish Bank Resolution Corporation (IBRC) was dramatically liquidated after the Fine Gael–Labour Party coalition passed emergency overnight legislation through the Oireachtas. The Taoiseach Enda Kenny described it as "a good day for the country and its people". He told the Dáil that there would be a €20 billion reduction in the borrowing requirement of the National Treasury Management Agency in the coming years as a result of the changes, but also cautioned that the agreement was not a "silver bullet".
- 9 February – Tens of thousands people marched against the bank debt burden in nationwide demonstrations in Dublin, Cork, Galway, Limerick, Waterford and Sligo.
- 11 February – A house was burnt to the ground in County Donegal three weeks after political criticism over a plan assigning it to a family of 13 Travellers. Fianna Fáil councillor Sean McEniff denied racism and bigotry as a result of comments he made in favour of the segregation of Travellers, while Fine Gael councillor and former Ballyshannon mayor Eugene Dolan proposed that Travellers should be sent to Spike Island.
- 11 February – Protesters against the household tax demonstrated at meetings of South Dublin County Council in Tallaght and Fingal County Council in Swords.
- 14 February – The High Court ruled in favour of Denis O'Brien against the Irish Daily Mail, marking the first time the defence of honest opinion was used in a defamation case in Ireland after its introduction as part of the Defamation Act 2009. O'Brien received €150,000.
- 15 February – Traditional Irish musicians, The Chieftains, during a visit to Houston, Texas performed a long-distance musical duet with astronaut Chris Hadfield on board the International Space Station by playing "Moondance" by Irish musician Van Morrison.

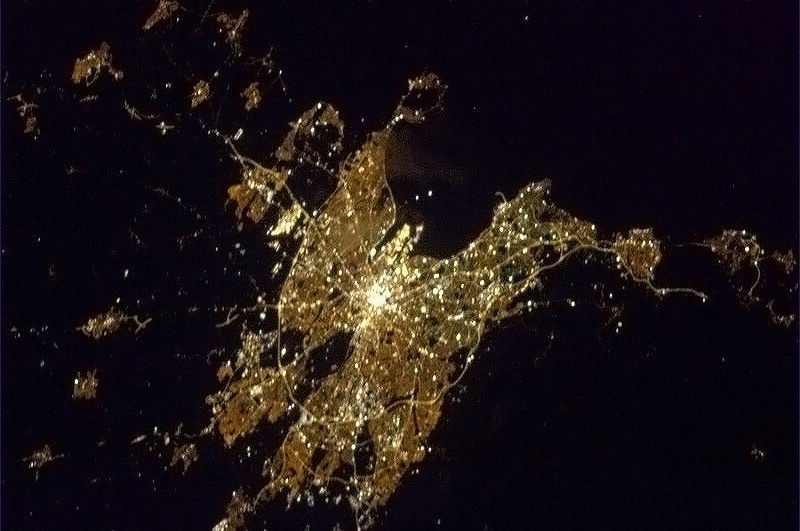
Dublin from earth orbit by Chris Hadfield

- 18 February – Chris Hadfield transmitted the first message in the Irish language from outer space when he tweeted "Tá Éire fíorálainn!* Land of green hills and dark beer. With capital Dublin glowing in the Irish night." (* Translation: Ireland is exquisite.) The message was accompanied by an orbital photograph by Hadfield of Dublin at night.
- 19 February – Taoiseach Enda Kenny delivered an emotional apology in Dáil Éireann on behalf of the State to the Magdalene Laundry survivors. The estimated 800 to 1,000 surviving Magdalene women were told that a compensation scheme would be set up for them.

=== March ===
- 6 March – Thomas Crosbie Holdings, publisher of the Irish Examiner, went into receivership.
- 7 March – The Sunday Business Post went into examinership.
- 14 March – The Lowry Tapes, containing a telephone conversation between corrupt politician Michael Lowry and land agent Kevin Phelan, were broadcast in full on Tonight with Vincent Browne.

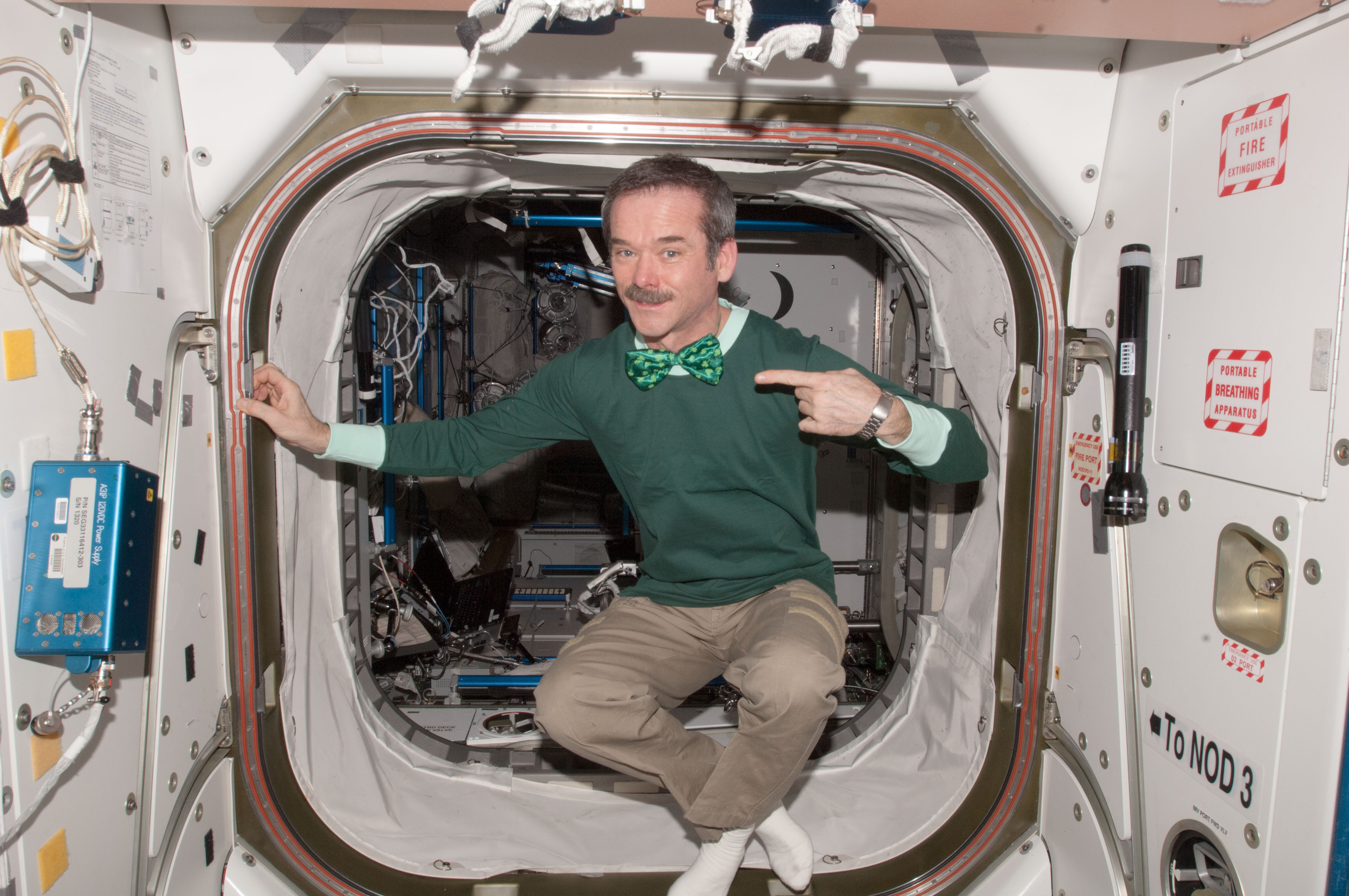
Chris Hadfield celebrated Saint Patrick's Day in the International Space Station

- 17 March – Saint Patrick's Day.
  - The government went on a round-the-world "Promote Ireland" programme. The Taoiseach, Enda Kenny, went to Washington, New York, Seattle and Silicon Valley, while Tánaiste and Minister for Foreign Affairs Eamon Gilmore went to Atlanta, New Orleans and Washington. Alan Shatter went to the Middle East, Leo Varadkar to Japan, Ruairi Quinn to China, Phil Hogan to Boston, Pat Rabbitte to New York, Joan Burton to Chicago, and Frances Fitzgerald to India. Other destinations included Brussels, Rome, Glasgow and Edinburgh.
  - Astronaut Chris Hadfield on board the International Space Station celebrated Saint Patrick's Day by photographing Ireland from orbit and wearing a green shirt as well as a green dicky bow sent to him by his wife on a cargo resupply spacecraft especially for the holiday. Hadfield posted a number of Irish-themed tweets during the day, including some in Irish, and posted a recording online of himself singing "Danny Boy".
- 18 March – President Higgins departed from Baldonnel Aerodrome for a three-day visit to Rome, accompanied by his wife Sabina and Minister for Finance Michael Noonan, to attend the inauguration of Jorge Bergoglio as Pope Francis.
- 19 March
  - President Higgins and his wife were greeted by the newly inaugurated Pope in the Vatican.
  - The Taoiseach, Enda Kenny presented a bowl of shamrock to U.S. President Barack Obama in Washington D.C.
  - Former President of Ireland, Mary Robinson was appointed by the United Nations as Special Envoy to the African Great Lakes region. Her mission was to implement an agreement to end violence in central Africa.
- 20 March – President Higgins held a bilateral meeting in Rome with the President of Mexico, Enrique Peña Nieto, who invited him to visit Mexico in October.
- 22 March – Shops and homes were damaged by floods in Blackpool, Cork.
- 27 March – Meath East by-election: Helen McEntee of Fine Gael was elected to Dáil Éireann.
- 31 March – Easter Sunday. Irish Standard Time (IST) began.

=== April ===
- 11 April – The Central Bank expressed regret over a James Joyce misquote on a new commemorative €10 coin. The bank tried to manage its mistake by claiming it was "artistic." Joyce's grandson, Stephen Joyce, criticised the coin and the manner of its release.
- 12 April – European Union finance ministers and central bank governors met at Dublin Castle for two days of talks on austerity and the creation of a federal bank.
- 13 April – Amid pouring rain, thousands of people from across Ireland marched in Dublin from O'Connell Street to Dublin Castle where they registered their protest against home and water taxes.
- 17 April – President Higgins addressed the European Parliament in Strasbourg in a speech entitled, Towards a European Union of the Citizens.
- 19 April – Former Fianna Fáil politician Ivor Callely was arrested and charged with fraudulently claiming mobile phone expenses over a three-year period.
- 19 April – The inquest into the death of Savita Halappanavar returned a verdict of "medical misadventure." The pregnant Halappanavar died of infection following hospital staff failure to recognise the seriousness of her condition and after her requests for an abortion were denied owing to legal restrictions.

=== May ===
- 1 May – Gardaí arrested five members of the Campaign Against Home and Water Taxes, including Cork City Councillors Ted Tynan and Mick Barry, during a midday protest inside the Patrick Street branch of the Bank of Ireland in the city. People gathered on the street. Councillor Tynan said he felt a need to stand up against austerity.
- 2 May – President Higgins criticised austerity politics in a Financial Times interview.
- 8 May – The births were confirmed of the first white-tailed eaglets born in Ireland in more than 100 years. The births, two at Mountshannon on Lough Derg in County Clare and one at Killarney National Park, had taken place in the previous week.
- 12 May – Bus Éireann workers went on strike over cuts.
- 12 May – Credit card details acquired by Abtran, the company which won the contract to operate the home tax helpline, were reported to have been misused.
- 15 May – Minister for Justice Alan Shatter criticised whistle blowers alleging widespread corruption in the Garda Síochána regarding the cancellation of driving penalty points. An investigation by the Garda Síochána into its own affairs dismissed the allegations of corruption.
- 15 May – During an appearance on the television programme, Prime Time, Minister Alan Shatter revealed personal information about political opponent Mick Wallace.
- 18 May – Cross-party calls increased for the resignation of Alan Shatter over his attempt to smear a political opponent on television.
- 21 May – Ireland was declared a tax haven at a high-profile senate hearing in the United States.
- 23 May – It emerged that the Minister for Justice Alan Shatter had been breathalysed by Gardaí. The minister later admitted no Garda report had been made into the incident.
- 24 May – Abtran, the company which won the contract to operate the home tax helpline, was announced to have also won the contract to operate the Irish Water water tax helpline.
- 28 May – Ireland's latest crèche scandal featured revelations of children being strapped into chairs, shouted at, manhandled and force-fed. A psychologist was deployed to counsel traumatised parents affected by the revelations concerning one crèche.
- 30 May – National Fish and Chip Day was celebrated. This is an annual marketing event begun in 2010 by an Italian–Irish business organisation, called the Irish Traditional Italian Chipper Association, to promote their wares and to distinguish what they describe as authentic Italian chippers from imitators.
- 31 May – Ireland was again declared a tax haven by the United States, a response provoked by a diplomatic letter claiming it was not. U.S. senators Carl Levin and John McCain concluded: "Most reasonable people would agree that negotiating special tax arrangements that allow companies to pay little or no income tax meets a common-sense definition of a tax haven."

=== June ===
- 17–18 June – While the U.S. President, Barack Obama, attended the G8 Summit in County Fermanagh, his wife Michelle and their daughters Malia and Sasha visited Dublin and Glendalough.
- 19 June – Independent Teachta Dála (TD) Clare Daly, speaking in Dáil Éireann, criticised the media and the government for their "slobbering" over the Obama family during their visit to Dublin and for "showcas[ing] us as a nation of pimps – prostituting ourselves in return for a pat on the head" and just stopping short of "deck[ing] the Cabinet out in leprechaun hats decorated with a bit of stars and stripes to really mark abject humiliation". Daly suggested Barack Obama was a war criminal as he "facilitated a 200 per cent increase in the use of drones which have killed thousands of people, including hundreds of children". She also criticised the special news bulletins covering such trivial items as what Michelle Obama and her daughters ate for lunch in Dalkey. The Taoiseach, Enda Kenny, dismissed her comments as "disgraceful".
- 24 June – The Irish Independent newspaper released secret recordings containing recorded telephone conversations between Anglo Irish Bank senior manager John Bowe, who had been involved in negotiations with the Central Bank, laughing and joking as he tells another senior manager, Peter Fitzgerald, how Anglo was luring the State into giving it billions of euros.
- 27 June – Senator David Norris spoke out against the abolition of Seanad Éireann, describing it as "a fraud perpetrated on the Irish people". Norris also criticised the government's attempt to reduce further the powers of the presidency, to make it "impossible" for an independent to get elected and to create more "jobs for the bloody boys the ones who dragged us into the ruins of this economy". Norris, as Father of the Seanad, called again for the Taoiseach, Enda Kenny – a "democrat who wouldn't recognise democracy if it came up and puked in his face" – to debate the matter with him, vowing to "peel the layers of dishonesty and populism away from him and show the Irish people what's really being done to them so they won't be fooled another time until they know what way to vote".
- 29 June – Thirty thousand people attended the annual gay pride parade in Dublin, the climax of a ten-day festival that marked three milestones: the 40th anniversary of the founding of the Irish Gay Movement, the 30th occasion of the gay pride parade, and the 20th anniversary of the decriminalisation of homosexuality in Ireland.

=== July ===
- 2 July – Requests for asylum and asylum assistance were made to 19 countries, including Ireland, on behalf of American whistleblower, Edward Snowden, who was stuck in the international transit lounge of Sheremetyevo International Airport in Moscow. Ireland refused the request on the grounds that his application could only be accepted if he had landed in, or was within, the Irish State.
- 4 July – People angry at the sale of family homes repossessed by banks, including representatives from groups such as People for Economic Justice, Defend Our Homes and Direct Democracy Ireland, as well as unaffiliated people, forced the cancellation of a property auction at the Shelbourne Hotel in Dublin.
- 5 July – The United States requested the Irish Government to arrest whistleblower Edward Snowden, should he arrive in Ireland.
- 8 July – The High Court denied an application by U.S. authorities for a provisional extradition warrant for Edward Snowden.
- Mid July – A heatwave occurred across Ireland causing a drought, and many people drowned.
- 11 July – Fine Gael TD Tom Barry, who had been drinking in the Dáil bar, provoked international headlines when he pulled party colleague Áine Collins onto his lap on live television during a late-night Dáil debate. Fine Gael said the incident was "silly" and "horseplay". However, the event provoked discussion nationwide about the treatment of women by men in Irish politics.
- 15 July – Senator David Norris told Seanad Éireann that Fine Gael TD Regina Doherty was "talking through her fanny" [vulva]: "I object in the strongest possible way to the idea that someone who has spent years in the House should have to listen to the Regina monologue from someone who has not been a wet weekend in the Oireachtas and is talking through her fanny". Norris was angry at Doherty's remarks during the launch of her party's referendum campaign to abolish the Seanad.
- 18 July – Beaumont Hospital announced it had been operating on patients using instruments which had been used on a patient with the fatal degenerative brain disease Creutzfeldt–Jakob disease.
- 23 July – Children who underwent a colonoscopy between 17 May and 5 July were involved in a contamination scare at Our Lady's Children's Hospital, Crumlin.
- 26 July – A state of emergency was declared at Letterkenny General Hospital as torrential rain caused flooding that destroyed the hospital's radiology department, outpatient department, pathology and medical records departments, kitchens and numerous wards, as well as the new emergency department recently opened by Health Minister James Reilly.
- 27 July (week ending) – First white-tailed sea eagles fledged in Ireland for 110 years, at Mountshannon, County Clare.

=== August ===
- Early August – Journalist and broadcaster Vincent Browne, in a Sunday Times interview, reacted to programmes about Travellers broadcast by his employer TV3, saying, "To say it was embarrassing doesn't begin to describe it. I squirmed and I railed against it. The Travellers stuff is appalling, absolutely appalling." When he complained to TV3 executive Ben Frow, Browne said he was "just amused at my indignation, which meant I couldn't get anywhere with it".
- 6 August – A three-day Dublin Bus strike came to an end after company management and the two main unions at the company, the National Bus and Rail Union and SIPTU accepted an invitation to talks at the Labour Court.

=== September ===
- Date unknown – An Al-Qaeda rocket attack on a container ship in the Suez Canal in July led to the discovery of €4.3 million worth of illegal cigarettes being smuggled to Ireland by gangsters in County Armagh and County Louth. The offending container was ultimately seized outside Dundalk in September and three suspects were arrested.
- 11 September – Irish football team manager Giovanni Trapattoni resigned following successive World Cup 2014 qualifier defeats.
- 17 September – The first female Ambassador of Ireland to the United States, Anne Anderson, presented her credentials to U.S. President, Barack Obama, in an Ambassador Credentialling Ceremony in the White House Oval Office.
- 23 September – Noel King was appointed as interim Irish football manager following Giovanni Trapattoni's resignation.
- 28 September – Following his retirement as an astronaut and while driving from Houston, Texas back to his home country, Canada, astronaut Chris Hadfield wrote an Irish Times article which began, "The first glimpse you get of Earth after you launch in a space shuttle from Kennedy Space Center, in Florida, is the green of Ireland. It is a wonderful sight when the sun shines through the clouds and you see a green jewel after all the blue of the Atlantic."
- 29 September – The Convention on the Constitution approved proposals to allow Irish emigrants to vote in presidential elections.

=== October ===
- 1 October – Pharmaceutical company Warner Chilcott was acquired by the American business Actavis who relocated their corporate headquarters to Dublin.
- 4 October – Two constitutional referendums were held. The Thirty-second Amendment Bill proposed abolishing Seanad Éireann, and was rejected, while the Thirty-third Amendment Bill proposed the establishment of a Court of Appeal to sit between the High Court and the Supreme Court, and was approved by voters.
- 8 October – The Cabinet approved the introduction of a new postcode system that will assign unique seven-character codes to every address in Ireland by 2015.
- 15 October – Crime boss John Gilligan was released from prison after 17 years behind bars.
- 15 October – The 2014 Budget was announced.
- 19–31 October – President Higgins paid official visits to Mexico, El Salvador, and Costa Rica, accompanied by his wife, Sabina, and Joe Costello, Minister of State at the Department of Foreign Affairs and Trade with responsibility for Trade and Development. Higgins had been invited by President Enrique Peña Nieto to visit Mexico during a bilateral meeting in Rome on 20 March.
- 27 October – Irish Standard Time (IST) ended.
- 30 October – Antisemitic and hate posters which were attached to a bridge in the Sugar Hill area of Limerick were removed. Some of the posters targeted Minister for Justice, Alan Shatter, who is a Jew. The broad theme of the posters was the recent years of Irish economic calamity, and attacked politicians, the main political parties, the new property tax, and the recent government budget, but they also attached antisemitic sentiments to their complaints: "Shatter has learned from his homeland how to crucify the little people" (Shatter's actual homeland is Ireland), "Jewish influence in our dictatorship has brought Palestinian devastation to Ireland," and under a picture of Shatter, "Ye will all be as poor as the Palestinians when are finished and be glad to have €5 a day." The police performed an investigation and identified as responsible members of a far-right extremist group.

=== November ===
- 5 November – The Football Association of Ireland announced that Martin O'Neill would replace Giovanni Trapattoni as manager of the Irish football team, with former team captain Roy Keane as his assistant. This created one of the most expensive football management teams in Europe. The €2 million per annum deal was funded by businessmen Denis O'Brien and Dermot Desmond, with O'Neill to be paid around €1.2 million and Keane to receive €0.7 million. They assumed their roles when the team met on 11 November to prepare for a friendly match against Latvia on the 15th.
- 6 November – The Government decided to hold a constitutional referendum on marriage for homosexuals during the first half of 2015.
- 10 November – Details of Sinn Féin fund-raising activity in the United States became public. The organisation Friends of Sinn Féin raised $392,000 between November 2012 and May 2013 and received donations from building contractors, trade unions and business people, some of whom have been involved in racism, discrimination, and embezzlement scandals.
- 11 November – The junior minister at the Department of Foreign Affairs and Trade, Joe Costello, opened Enterprise Ireland's new offices in Johannesburg where thirty Irish companies are operating. Costello was leading a five-day, 37-company trade mission to South Africa and Nigeria to increase Irish exports to the region. It was the first-ever such Irish mission to Nigeria.
- 12 November – Former Fianna Fáil senator Francis O'Brien was sent to prison for two years for attempting to extort €100,000 from a veterinary inspector.
- 12 November – Newly appointed assistant national football team manager Roy Keane held a press conference in Malahide. The event was packed with journalists and photographers and was broadcast live by three television channels.
- 15 November – The Special European Union Programmes Body withdrew funding for the proposed 195-metre Narrow Water Bridge across the Newry River to link Cornamucklagh near Omeath in County Louth to Narrow Water near Warrenpoint in County Down. The E.U. decision was because "additional funding required to deliver the project has not been secured" by Louth County Council.
- 16 November – Áras an Uachtaráin announced that Michael D. Higgins will become the first Irish President to make an official state visit to Britain in April 2014. Higgins and his wife will stay at Windsor Castle and will be welcomed by Elizabeth II at a state banquet. He will visit the Prime Minister, David Cameron, at Downing Street and will also meet opposition party leaders at Westminster, and the Lord Mayor of London. It was the first time an Irish head of state had been formally invited to the United Kingdom by a British sovereign, and it will be Higgins' 14th visit to the United Kingdom since he became president.
- 26 November – Author John Banville was given the Bob Hughes Lifetime Achievement Award at the Irish Book Awards.
- 29 November – New data from the Central Statistics Office showed a five percent drop in the birthrate since 2012, and a climb in the death rate. The national population was estimated to have reached 4.593 million people by the second quarter of 2013. Women were having an average of 1.9 children each. One-third of babies were born outside marriage. The national birth rate was 14.9 per 1,000 people; the highest rate was in Fingal (19 per 1,000) and the lowest in County Mayo (12.1).
- 30 November – Pat Storey became the first woman to be a bishop in Ireland or Britain when she was consecrated in Dublin as the Church of Ireland Bishop of Meath and Kildare.
- Undated – Elizabeth Clarke disappeared in Navan, County Meath.

=== December ===
- 1 December – The Taoiseach, Enda Kenny, departed for a five-day visit to Japan. The purpose was to improve business relations between the two countries, with emphasis on the re-introduction of Irish beef to Japan for the first time since the mad cow disease crisis of 2000. Kenny was accompanied by the Minister for Agriculture, Simon Coveney, and by what the Irish Times described as "a big trade mission" including representatives of Bord Bia, and 29 agriculture and food companies such as Dairygold, Glanbia, the Irish Dairy Board, Kepak, and Kerry Group. The last Japanese visit by a taoiseach was in 2009.
- 2 December – Peter Tyndall received his Warrant of Appointment as Ombudsman and Information Commissioner from President Higgins at a ceremony in Áras an Uachtaráin. He replaced the outgoing Emily O'Reilly.
- 3 December – The Smithwick Tribunal inquiry into the 1989 Jonesborough ambush found that members of the Garda Síochána had colluded with the Provisional Irish Republican Army in the shooting of two Royal Ulster Constabulary officers as they crossed the Irish border.
- 3 December – Colm Keaveney, Teachta Dála (TD), former Labour Party chairman, joined the Fianna Fáil party.
- 4 December – Forbes magazine ranked Ireland the best place in the world for business and described the country as having an "extremely pro-business environment". The magazine ranked 145 countries by eleven factors: property rights, innovation, taxes, technology, corruption, freedom (personal, trade, and monetary), red tape, investor protection, and stock market performance. Other statistics showed GDP was $210 billion (€155 billion), GDP growth was 0.9%, GDP per capita was $44,100 (€32,450), and the trade balance was 1.7% of GDP.
- 6 December – President Higgins signed a book of condolences at the University of Galway for the anti-apartheid revolutionary and former President of South Africa, Nelson Mandela, who died the day before. Higgins recalled the last time he met him in 2003 when Mandela received an honorary doctorate of law from the University.
- 8 December – The threat of an Electricity Supply Board (ESB) workers' strike and Christmas season power cuts were avoided when company management and the ESB Group of Unions resolved their differences over the workers' pension fund during talks facilitated by the Labour Relations Commission.
- 9 December – A dinner at the Irish Ambassador's residence in South Africa attended by President Higgins and Tánaiste Eamon Gilmore was held in honour of three Dunnes Stores anti-apartheid strikers, Mary Manning, Liz Deasy, and Karen Gearon, whose actions led to Ireland becoming the first country to ban South African goods in 1987. The Irish group were in South Africa for the state funeral of Nelson Mandela in FNB Stadium in Soweto.
- 10 December – An Irish delegation attended the State Memorial Service in honour of Nelson Mandela. It included President Higgins, his wife Sabina, Eamon Gilmore, former President of Ireland and friend of Mandela, Mary Robinson, Ireland's ambassador to South Africa Brendan McMahon, and three Dunnes Stores anti-apartheid strikers.
- 11 December – The Congress of South African Trade Unions hailed the visiting Dunnes Stores anti-apartheid strikers at a press conference in Johannesburg.
- 11 December – At the request of President Jacob Zuma of South Africa, President Higgins delivered "a well-received tour de force" when he made keynote remarks on behalf of Europe at a lunch in Pretoria marking the first day of Nelson Mandela's lying in state in the Union Buildings.
- 13 December – Canadian retired astronaut and International Space Station commander Chris Hadfield arrived in Ireland for a series of engagements, appearances, and interviews to promote his memoir, An Astronaut's Guide To Life. He reported that when orbiting the Earth in the International Space Station, "Ireland is the first place you come to after crossing the Atlantic. It's so beautiful and green especially in spring."
- 14 December – Hadfield performed Van Morrison's song "Moondance" with The Chieftains in Dublin, repeating together on Earth a duet he last performed with them on 15 February when he was on board the International Space Station and The Chieftains were in Houston. Later, Eason's bookshop had its biggest book signing in more than three years and ran out of its 650 copies of Hadfield's memoir when people queued out the shop door and halfway down Middle Abbey Street to meet the astronaut. The memoir also sold out in all other bookshops in Dublin.
- 16 December – A survey of 131 countries between 2006 and 2012 revealed that the median Irish per capita income was $8,048 per annum (€5,852), higher than the global median of $2,920 (€2,123).
- 18 December – The Garda Síochána and Police Service of Northern Ireland prevented a serious bomb attack, probably on a commercial target in Belfast, by arresting a man and a woman in County Armagh, both from Dundalk, and another man in Dundalk. Police found equipment and ingredients to create a large fertilizer bomb.
- 20 December – Senator David Norris said he had requested that Pope Francis be invited to address Seanad Éireann. He pointed out that Jorge Bergoglio had spent three months at Milltown College in Ranelagh in early 1980, where he learned English. Senator Feargal Quinn responded that "even just issuing an invitation would greatly increase the stature of the House".
- 31 December – The six-month Haass negotiations concluded without resolving inter-community conflict in Northern Ireland over flags, parades, and the history of The Troubles.

== The arts ==
Film

- 9 February – The 10th Irish Film & Television Awards were held in Dublin.
- 18–20 October – Richard Harris Film Festival at University of Limerick.

Literature

- 4 June – Colum McCann's novel TransAtlantic was published.
- 27 June – Donal Ryan's novel The Spinning Heart was published.
- 23 July – Donal Ryan's debut novel, The Spinning Heart, was longlisted for the Booker Prize.
- August – Roddy Doyle's novel The Guts was published.
- 10 September – Colm Tóibín's novel The Testament of Mary was shortlisted for the 2013 Booker Prize for fiction.
- Eimear McBride's debut novel A Girl Is a Half-formed Thing was published.

Music

Television

== Sport ==
=== Association football ===
- 7–9 June – Irish World Cup, at University College Dublin.

International friendly matches

- 6 February – Ireland 2–0 Poland.
- 29 May – England 1–1 Ireland.
- 2 June – Ireland 4–0 Georgia.
- 11 June – Spain 2–0 Ireland.
- 14 August – Wales 0–0 Ireland.
- 15 November – Ireland 3–0 Latvia.
- 19 November – Poland 0–0 Ireland.

World Cup 2014 qualifiers

- 22 March – Sweden 0–0 Ireland.
- 26 March – Ireland 2–2 Austria.
- 7 June – Ireland 3–0 Faroe Islands.
- 6 September – Ireland 1–2 Sweden.
- 10 September – Austria 1–0 Ireland.
- 11 October – Germany 3–0 Ireland.
- 15 October – Ireland 3–1 Kazakhstan.

=== Athletics ===
- 14 February – Armagh International Road Race.
- 17 February – Rás na hÉireann International Cross Country.
- 16 March – Tralee International Marathon, in Tralee.
- 5 May – Great Limerick Run, in Limerick.
- 6 July – All Ireland Men's Mini Marathon, in Galway.

=== Cycling ===
- 24 March – Stephen Roche Atlantic Challenge, in Lahinch.
- 4 May – the Dingle Cycle Challenge, in Dingle Peninsula.

=== Gaelic games ===
Football

- 22 September – All-Ireland final: Dublin 2-12 – 1-14 Mayo.

Hurling

- 7 July – Leinster final – Dublin 2-25 – 2-13 Galway.
- 14 July – Munster final – Limerick 0-24 – 0-15 Cork.
- 28 September – All-Ireland final – Clare 5-16 – 3-16 Cork (after a replay).

=== Golf ===
- 15 January – Paul McGinley was named as Ireland's first Ryder Cup captain.

=== Kitesurfing ===
- 25–26 May – Puremagic Battle for the Bay 2013 on Dollymount Strand in Clontarf.

== Deaths ==
=== January ===
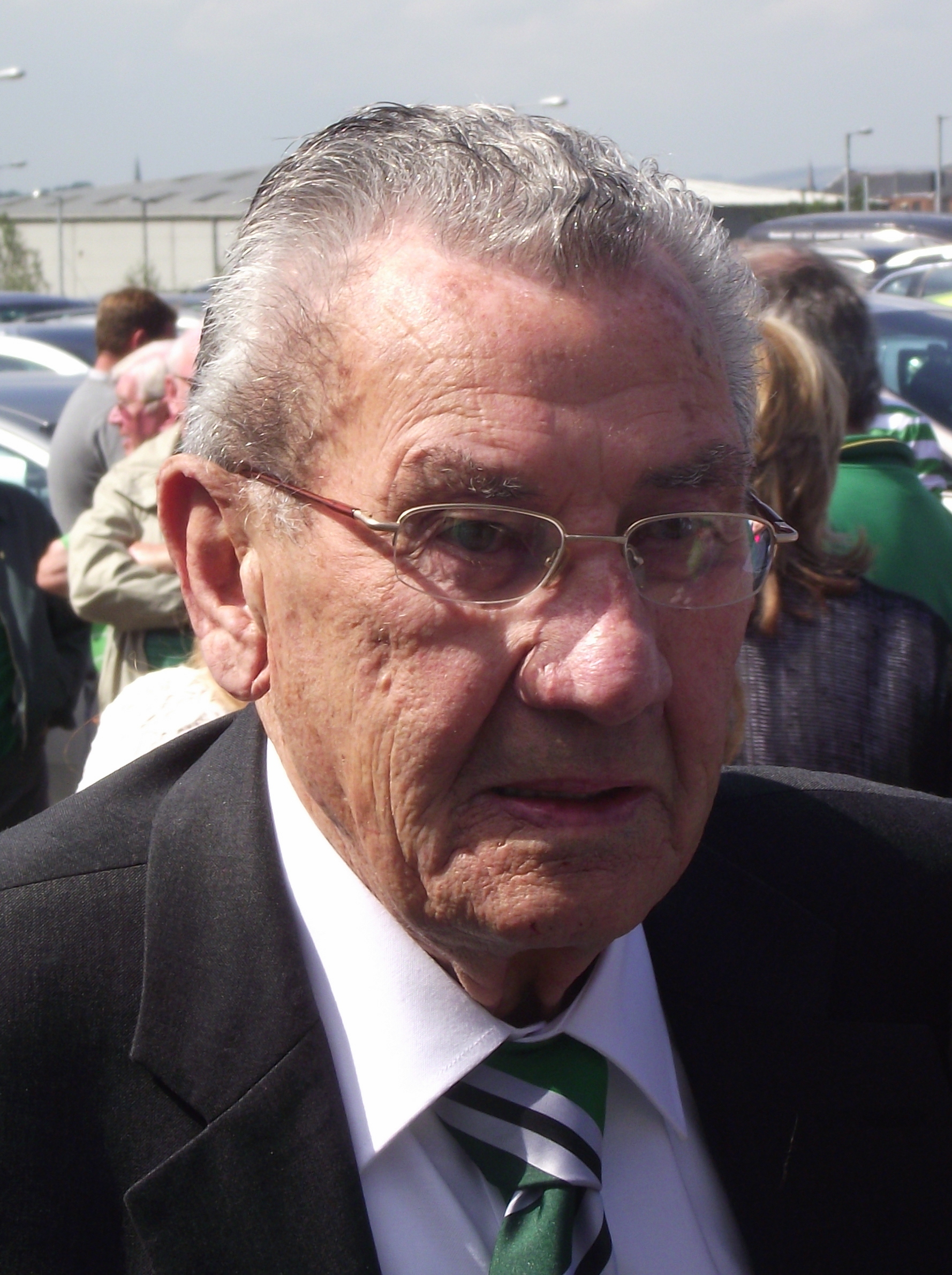
Sean Fallon

- 2 January –
  - Joe McGrath: former Cork Gaelic football and hurling coach, long illness.
  - Ian McKeever, 42: adventurer and mountain climber, killed by lightning strike.
- 3 January – John McAndrew, 85: former Mayo Gaelic footballer, long illness.
- 6 January – Mikey Clancy, 22: professional windsurfer.
- 10 January – Patrick J. Corish, 91: academic and Roman Catholic priest.
- 13 January – Paddy O'Keeffe, 89: chairman of the Agriculture Trust and former Irish Farmers Journal editor.
- 16 January – Dan Morrissey, 88: former president of the League of Ireland.
- 18 January – Seán Fallon, 90: former Sligo Gaelic footballer and Celtic F.C. footballer.
- 22 January – Jackie McKenna, 93: former Dingle Gaelic footballer and Roman Catholic priest.
- 23 January – Dolours Price, 61: political activist and Provisional Irish Republican Army member, suddenly through misadventure.
- 25 January – Kevin Heffernan, 83: former Dublin Gaelic footballer and manager, long illness.
- 26 January – Jimmy Stewart, 78: politician, Chairman of the Communist Party of Ireland (1983–2002).
- 27 January – Éamon de Buitléar, 83: writer, musician and film maker.
- 29 January – Leo Ward, 94: former Drumcondra F.C. association footballer and cinema chain owner, natural causes.
- 31 January – Joseph Cassidy, 79, Roman Catholic prelate, Archbishop of Tuam (1987–1994).

=== February ===
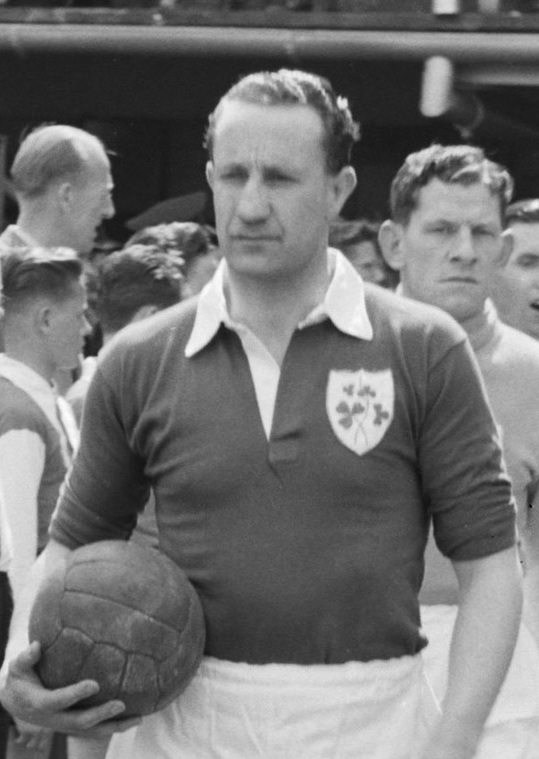
Con Martin

- 2 February – John Coughlan, 69: journalist, illness.
- 3 February – Annie Kett, 107, Ireland's oldest person.
- 4 February – Kevin B. Nowlan, 91, conservationist and academic.
- 8 February –
  - Brendan Fullam, Gaelic games author.
  - Ian Stuart, 86, artist and sculptor, illness.
- 9 February –
  - Séamus Coughlan, 59, former Cork Gaelic footballer, cancer.
  - Jimmy Smyth, 82, former Clare hurler.
  - Jack Jones, 91, pioneer of Irish market research.
- 10 February – Tom O'Donnell, 88, comedian and one half of variety act Tom & Paschal.
- 12 February – Jimmy Mulroy, 72, former Louth Gaelic footballer and senator, illness.
- 13 February – Johnny Murphy, 71, journalist and sportswriter, short illness.
- 17 February – Seán Óg Ó Ceallacháin, 89, former Dublin hurler and Gaelic games broadcaster.
- 24 February – Con Martin, 89, former Dublin Gaelic footballer who also enjoyed a successful soccer career, playing for, among others, Leeds United and Aston Villa.

=== March ===
- 4 March – Paddy Downey, 84: sports journalist.
- 6 March – Bobby Buckley, 81: former Kerry Gaelic footballer.
- 8 March – John O'Connell, 83: former Ceann Comhairle, government minister and Labour Party and Fianna Fáil TD and Member of the European Parliament (MEP).
- 10 March – Tony Mansfield, 73: former Waterford hurler and manager, illness.
- 23 March – Christopher Robson, co-founder of the Gay and Lesbian Equality Network.
- 26 March – Bill Walsh, 90: former Kilkenny hurler.
- 29 March – Reginald Gray, 82: painter, stomach cancer.

=== April ===
- 2 April – Milo O'Shea, 86: character actor, short illness.
- 6 April – Matt Gilsenan, 97: former Meath Gaelic footballer, short illness.
- 9 April – Jim McAllister, 68, Northern Irish politician.
- 11 April – Bernard McGlinchey, 80: businessman and politician, Senator (1961–1981, 1982–1983).
- 18 April – Gráinne Yeats, 88, Irish harpist and singer.
- 23 April – Tony Grealish, 56: English-born Republic of Ireland international association footballer, cancer.
- 27 April – Tony "Socks" Byrne, 82: amateur boxer who won a bronze medal at the 1956 Summer Olympics.
- 28 April – Richard Barry, 93: former Fine Gael TD, short illness.
- 29 April – Harry Blaney, 85: former Independent Fianna Fáil TD.

=== May ===
- 3 May – Paddy Berkery, 84: former Ireland and Munster rugby union player, short illness.
- 10 May – Vincent Dowling, 83, actor and theatre director, complications following surgery.
- 15 May – Paddy Buggy, 84: GAA administrator (President, 1982–1985) and Kilkenny hurler (1949–1960).
- 20 May – Seán Kinsella, 81: restaurateur, regarded as Ireland's first celebrity chef.

=== June ===
- 5 June – Ruairí Ó Brádaigh, 80, politician, TD for Longford–Westmeath (1957–1961), President of Sinn Féin (1970–1983) and Republican Sinn Féin (1987–2009).
- 14 June –
  - Pa Dillon, 75: Kilkenny hurler, short illness.
  - Hugh Maguire, 86, violinist.
- 21 June – Jim Reilly, 88: Meath Gaelic footballer, short illness.
- 29 June – Peter Fitzgerald, 76, international footballer.

=== July ===
- 4 July – Bernie Nolan, 52, singer (The Nolans) and actress.
- 10 July – Jack and Tommy Blaine, 68 and 70, murder victims.
- 17 July – David Collins, 57, restaurant designer (Gordon Ramsay at Royal Hospital Road, The Wolseley), complications of skin cancer.
- 20 July – Thomas Salmon, 100, Anglican clergy, Dean of Christ Church Cathedral, Dublin (1969–1990).
- 29 July – Colm Murray, 61, television newsreader and sports broadcaster, motor neuron disease.

=== August ===
- 11 August – Frank O'Reilly, 91, businessman, banker and academic; Chancellor of the University of Dublin (1985–1998).
- 13 August – Kevin Feeney, 61, judge, member of the High Court (since 2006), suspected heart attack.
- 14 August – Paddy Power, 84, politician, MEP (1977–1979), TD for Kildare (1969–1989).
- 19 August –
  - Pat Delaney, 71, former Kilkenny hurler, long illness.
  - William McDermott, 83, Irish-born Peruvian Roman Catholic prelate, Bishop of Huancavélica (1982–2005).
- 26 August – Gerard Murphy, 64, film, television and theatre actor, prostate cancer.
- 29 August – Maidhc Dainín Ó Sé, 71, writer and musician, suddenly.
- 30 August – Seamus Heaney, 74, poet, winner of the Nobel Prize in Literature (1995).

=== September ===
- 9 September – Susan Fitzgerald, 64, actress, from cancer.
- 15 September – Tomás Ó Canainn, 82, uileann piper and engineering lecturer, illness.
- 17 September – Michael J. Noonan, 78, former Fianna Fáil politician and Minister for Defence, illness.
- 25 September – Paddy McFlynn, 96: GAA administrator (President 1979-1982).
- 26 September –
  - Don Donovan, 83, football player and manager (Grimsby Town, Everton, Boston United).
  - Seánie Duggan, 90, hurler (Galway).

=== October ===
- 1 October – Martin O'Toole, 88, politician, Senator (1977–1989); TD for Mayo West (1989–1992).
- 8 October – Phil Chevron, 56, musician (The Pogues), oesophageal cancer.
- 21 October – Jackie Rea, 92, snooker player.
- 23 October – Niall Donoghue, 22, Galway hurler, suicide.
- 25 October – Tommy McConville, 67, footballer.
- 26 October – Denis Foley, 79, politician, Fianna Fáil TD for Kerry North (1981-1987 and 1992-2002); Senator (1989-1993), long illness.
- 27 October – Noel Davern, 67, politician, Fianna Fáil TD for Tipperary South (1969-1981 and 1987-2007); MEP for Munster (1979-1984).
- 31 October —
  - John J. Byrne, 93, property developer.
  - Kevin Lynch, 85, judge.

=== November ===
- 11 November – Jerome Murphy-O'Connor, 78, biblical scholar.
- 21 November – Darragh Walsh, 22, Gaelic footballer, road traffic accident.
- 22 November –
  - Tom Gilmartin, 78, businessman and pivotal Mahon Tribunal witness, long illness.
  - Alec Reid, 82, priest noted for his facilitator role in the Northern Ireland peace process, short illness.
- 24 November – Charlie Ware, 80, hurler (Waterford).
- 26 November – Jackie Morley, 79, former Cork Hibernians F.C. association footballer, short illness.
- 30 November – Dan O'Sullivan, 86, former Cork Gaelic footballer, natural causes.

=== December ===
- 2 December – Liam Connor, 58, former Offaly Gaelic footballer, illness.
- 4 December – Paddy O'Byrne, 83, radio broadcaster (Radio 702) and actor.
- 6 December – Louis Jacobson, 95, cricket player.
- 14 December – Peter O'Toole, 81, actor.
- 16 December — Pat Crowley, 80, fashion designer.
- 16 December – Conn McCluskey, 99, civil rights activist.
- 18 December – Harry Boland, 88, Olympic basketball player (1948), suddenly.
- 20 December – Marie Fleming, 59, university lecturer and euthanasia campaigner, multiple sclerosis.
- 21 December – Bernard Henry McGinn, 50s, Irish Republican Army terrorist, murderer.
- 22 December – Shem Downey, 91, former Kilkenny hurler, natural causes.
- 23 December
  - Neil McLaughlin, 65, Olympic boxer.
  - Mickey Fagan, 68, former Westmeath hurler and Gaelic footballer, multiple sclerosis.
  - Willie White, 92, former Carlow Gaelic footballer, short illness.

== See also ==
- 2013 in Irish television
