= Ricardo Baptista Leite =

Portuguese medical doctor

Dr. Ricardo Baptista Leite
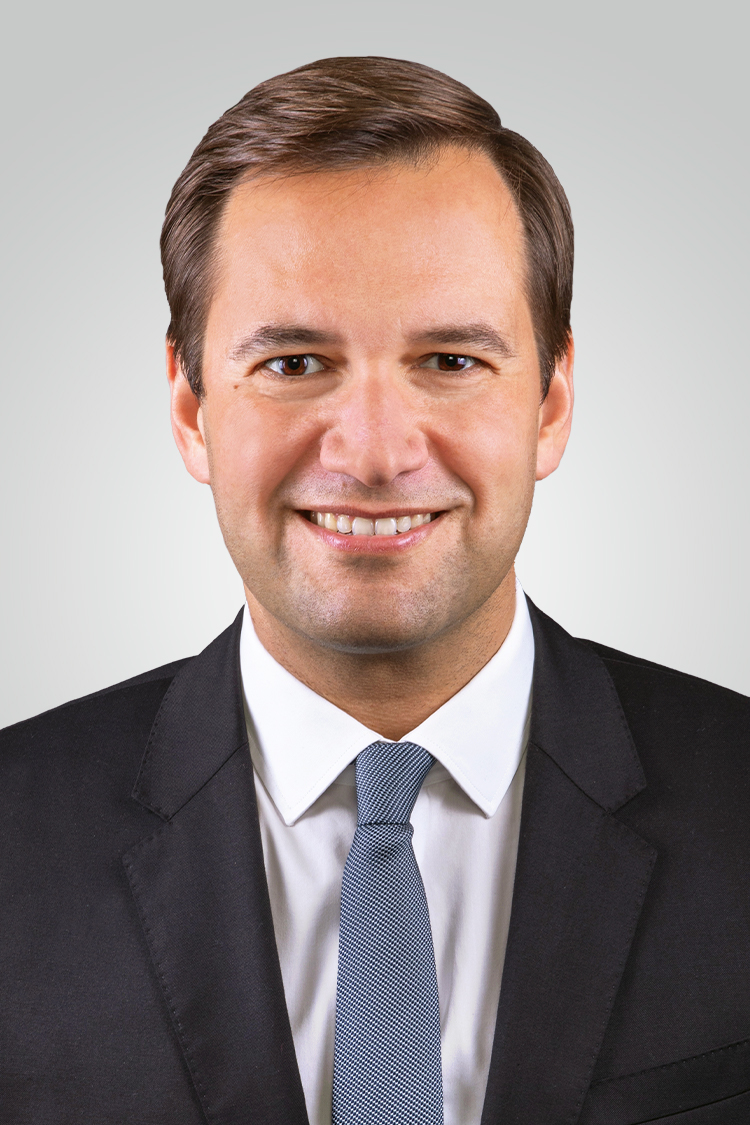
- Official portrait, 2022

Member of the Assembly of the Republic
- In office 1 July 2011 – 16 May 2023
- Constituency: Lisbon

Member of the Sintra City Council
- In office 26 September 2021 – Present

Member of the Cascais City Council
- In office 9 October 2005 – 26 September 2021

Personal details
- Born: Ricardo Augustus Guerreiro Baptista Leite; 31 May 1980 (age 46) Toronto, Canada
- Citizenship: Portugal; Canada
- Party: Social Democratic Party (2000–present)
- Domestic partner: Teresa Anjinho (since 2014)
- Children: 3
- Education: NOVA University Lisbon
- Profession: Infectious Disease doctor
- Website: https://www.ricardobaptistaleite.pt

Ricardo Augustus Guerreiro Baptista Leite (born 31 May 1980) is a Portuguese medical doctor, manager, author, university professor, analyst and politician. He is the chief executive officer of 'HealthAI – The Global Agency for Responsible AI in Health' (former I-DAIR) and member of the Sintra City Council. In 2024, he was appointed as Obama Foundation Europe Leader. He is the Founder and President of the UNITE Parliamentarians Network for Global Health. He is chair of the Board of the ‘Global Health Policy Lab,’ an academic collaborative between Harvard University and Charité University, based in Berlin and the Chair of the ‘Center for Global Health’ at NOVA University Lisbon Information Management and Data Science School. He also served as a Member of the Portuguese National Parliament for four terms and as a member of the Cascais City Council, between 2005 and 2021.

== Early life and education ==
Baptista Leite was born in Toronto, Canada, son of João Baptista Leite and Ana Maria Guerreiro Leite who fled Portugal after the Carnation Revolution in 1975. He studied from pre-school until 5th grade at Regina Mundi Catholic School in Toronto. In 1991, he moved with his family to Portugal where he completed 6th grade at the English-speaking St. Dominic's International School. After learning how to speak Portuguese, he enrolled at Colégio Marista de Carcavelos.

Baptista Leite enrolled at the Faculdade de Ciências Médicas of the NOVA University Lisbon, and obtained his medical degree in 2004. In 2005, Baptista Leite completed a one-year general medical residency program at Fernando Fonseca Hospital, following which he enrolled in a five-year infectious diseases residency program. After completing the first year of the program at Coimbra Hospital Centre, he moved back to Lisbon, having trained for more than four years of the practical curricula of the residency program at Egas Moniz Hospital in July 2011. He completed traineeships in microbiology, virology and intensive care medicine. He also completed an internship in public health at the World Health Organization Regional Office for Europe.

He completed his post-graduation studies in diverse academic institutions, such as Johns Hopkins University, the Harvard Kennedy School of Government, and the Harvard Medical School.

Baptista Leite is a PhD candidate in Public Health and Health Systems at Maastricht University.

Since 2014, he is in a relationship with the Portuguese lawyer and politician and European Oumbudsman, Teresa Anjinho.

== Career ==
Baptista Leite was the Head of Public Health within the Research Center of the Instituto de Ciências da Saúde at the Catholic University of Portugal. He is a member of the faculty with teaching and research responsibilities at the department of Microbiology and Parasitology at the NOVA Medical School of the NOVA University of Lisbon since 2007. He is also a guest lecturer at the NOVA IMS (Information Management School) at NOVA University, where he is the coordinator of the curricular unit on Sustainable Healthcare. For a brief period of time he was a medical consultant in the field of information technologies geared to healthcare.

Baptista Leite founded the Creating Health - Research and Innovation Funding, is co-founder of the Estoril Conferences, a member of the European Leadership Network and of the 2015 European Young Leaders programme. In 2014 and 2015, he published two books as the main author of Consenso estratégico para a gestão integrada da hepatite C em Portugal and Cidadania para a Saúde, focused on the role of citizens in health promotion and disease prevention. In 2020 he published Um caminho para a Cura, a book about the Portuguese National Health Service, and the future of public health policy.

Baptista Leite was named, in 2016, by The Economist as a HCV Change Maker in recognition of his leadership in the field of hepatitis C. The following year, he founded Unite – Global Parliamentarians Network to end HIV/AIDS, Viral Hepatitis and other Infectious Diseases, under the auspices of UNAIDS and committed to ending these global health threats, in accordance with the Sustainable Development Goals. In 2019, he was made vice-president of The Parliamentary Network on the World Bank & International Monetary Fund.

In 2019, he became Global Ambassador of the ‘G20 Health & Development Partnership’ advising and advocating G20 countries on health policies aligned with the UN Sustainable Development Goals.

In 2020, Baptista Leite was invited to become a resident commentator on the cable news channel CMTV.

On 22 May 2023, after an international recruitment process, he was appointed CEO 'HealthAI - The Global Agency for Responsible AI in Health' (former I-DAIR), a global nonprofit organization advocating for responsible AI in Health.

Since February 2024, Baptista Leite has been a member of the Portuguese Diaspora Council and coordinates the Competence Center for Health, Well-Being and Health Sciences.

In 2024, he was the first leader from Portugal to be selected for the Obama Foundation Leaders program.

== Political activity ==
Baptista Leite was introduced into party politics in 2000 by Portugal's President Marcelo Rebelo de Sousa. At the time, he enrolled both in the Social Democratic Party (PSD) and the Social Democratic Youth (JSD), and one year later he was elected as member of São Domingos de Rana Town Hall Assembly, having completed the mandate in October 2005.

Having left the Social Democratic Youth at the age limit of 30, Baptista Leite was voted as a lifetime honorary member of the organization at their XXI National Convention in 2010, in this same year as a member of the National Committee for Reviewing the PSD Political Program, "GENEPSD", mainly on issues associated with healthcare and local government. Baptista Leite served as Director of the National Studies Cabinet, and also chaired two educational political courses, where he promoted a debate between two former Prime Ministers of Portugal, from different parties, Francisco Pinto Balsemão from PSD and Mário Soares from PS.

Baptista Leite was President of the Cascais Political Committee, from 9 May 2008 to 9 June 2010. During this mandate, PSD won the European elections, and in Cascais the party achieved its greatest majority in recent democratic history, having elected António D'Orey Capucho as Mayor.

Baptista Leite is an elected Member of Parliament since 1 July 2011. He was chair of the all-party Parliamentary HIV/AIDS work group. He was also an elected member of the Cascais City Hall Assembly, since 9 October 2005. As an MP, he was elected member of the supervisory board of the National Genetic Database Protection Agency, and member of the Adisory Board for the national HIV-AIDS program from Direção-Geral da Saúde.

Baptista Leite is a member of Parliamentarians for Global Action Network, since 2015 European Young Leaders Programme, and the only Portuguese citizen invited to be part of the European Leadership Network. He was also a member of the healthcare policy work group at the Francisco Sá Carneiro Institute, at the time presided over by Alexandre Relvas, and by invitation from the institute's president, Carlos Carreiras. In 2018, he was chosen for the Marshall Memorial Fellowship, one of the leadership development programs of the German Marshall Fund.

In 2019, Baptista Leite was elected vice-president of the parliamentary board of the Social Democratic Party, responsible for Health, Culture and Communication, Agriculture, and member of the Foreign Affairs committee. He has now founded Unite Network. He is a fellow of the Millennium leadership programme at the Atlantic Council.

== Publications ==
- Consenso estratégico para a gestão integrada da hepatite C em Portugal, Lisboa, Universidade Católica Editora, 2014
- Cidadania para a Saúde, Lisboa, Universidade Católica Editora, 2015
- Um Caminho para a Cura, Lisboa, Leya, 2020
