= Michael Mills (journalist) =

Irish journalist and first Ombudsman (1927–2008)

Ombudsman
- In office 2 January 1984 – 31 October 1994
- Preceded by: New office
- Succeeded by: Kevin Murphy

Personal details
- Born: 31 October 1927 Mountmellick, Ireland
- Died: 13 April 2008 (aged 80) Dublin, Ireland

Michael Mills (31 October 1927 – 13 April 2008) was an Irish journalist who served as Ireland's first Ombudsman for two terms beginning in 1984. He retired from the office in 1994.

Mills grew up in Mountmellick, County Laois. He initially trained to become a Passionist priest. However, he abandoned that calling after catching tuberculosis to take a junior reporter job with the People newspaper group in Wexford. He turned journalism into a full-time career and worked from 1964 as a reporter for The Irish Press for over twenty years.

When he corrected a mistake in a Dáil speech by Éamon de Valera he was not allowed to report again from the Dáil for seven years. Instead, he practiced drama criticism. Then he was appointed by de Valera's son, Vivion, as political correspondent of the newspaper, and went on to become its political editor.

In 1983, Mills was nominated by the government as Ireland's first Ombudsman, taking office in January 1984. During his two terms in office, Mills investigated complaints from the public about local authorities, government departments and health boards. He retired in 1994 at the age of 67.

He published his memoirs Hurler on the Ditch in 2005, which was also the name of a Teilifís Éireann programme on which he was one of the first panelists in the mid-1960s.

Mills, who lived in Templeogue, died at the age of 80 on 13 April 2008, after a short illness. He was survived by his wife, Bríd, and eight children.

Tributes poured in from across Ireland on the news of his death. Former taoiseach Bertie Ahern called him a respected public servant and one of Ireland's finest journalists. Ombudsman Emily O'Reilly said that Mills laid the groundwork for the future and growth of the office she then occupied. Tributes were also paid by the Irish Human Rights Commission and the Children's Rights Alliance.

== Works ==
- Hurler on the Ditch: From Journalist to Ombudsman. Currach Press. 2005. ISBN 978-1856079198.
