= Sheedy v Information Commissioner =

Irish Supreme Court case

- Coat of arms of Ireland
- Court: Supreme Court of Ireland
- Full case name: Barney Sheedy v The Information Commissioner
- Decided: 30 May 2005
- Citation: [2005] IESC 35, [2005] 2 IR 272
- Transcript: https://www.bailii.org/ie/cases/IESC/2005/S35.html

Case history
- Appealed from: High Court: Sheedy v Information Commissioner [2004] 2 IR 533
- Appealed to: Supreme Court

Court membership
- Judges sitting: Denham J., Fennelly J., Kearns J.

Case opinions
- Question surrounding if the release of school reports compiled by Department of Education would enable compilation of information in respect of comparative performance of schools. The court ruled that the statutory privilege to deny access to the data of schools superseded the various Freedom of Information provisions
- Decision by: Kearns J.

Keywords
- Administrative law, Freedom of information

Barney Sheedy v The Information Commissioner, [2005] IESC 35; [2005] 2 IR 272 is an Irish Supreme Court case where Mr Barney Sheedy appealed against a High Court decision to not overturn a promise made by the Information Commissioner to grant access to redacted versions of certain reports of The Irish Times newspaper. The appellant argued that the High Court judge misdirected himself in law and was wrong in his interpretation of the Education Act 1998 and of the Freedom of Information Act 1997. This was the first opportunity for the Supreme Court to interpret The Freedom of Information Act.

The main legal question to be answered was whether the court should grant the Department of Education to release school reports pursuant to Freedom of Information Act 1998, despite concerns that this might give rise to the production of school league tables which is contrary to the Education Act 1998.

== Background and High Court case ==
The Irish Times had successfully appealed against the Department of Education and Science's refusal to allow it access to school reports prepared by the Department, relying on the provisions of the Freedom of Information Act 1997.

However, Mr Sheedy, a principal of one of the schools detailed in the reports, made an appeal against this decision to grant access to the redacted version of the school report. The appellant argued the High Court judge misdirected himself in law and was wrong in his interpretation of section 53 of the Education Act 1998 and sections 21, 26 and 32(1)(a) of the Freedom of information Act 1997. It was contended that a correct interpretation of the aforementioned provisions would not allow the release of the reports.

In the High Court case Sheedy v Information Commissioner [2004] 2 IR 533, Gilligan J affirmed the Information Commissioner's decision to allow the release of the reports and so Mr Sheedy appealed the decision to the Supreme Court.

== Holding of the Supreme Court ==
During the appeal to the Supreme Court, Kearns J overruled the High Court's decision stating that the report should not be released based on section 53 of the Education Act 1998. However, the court did affirm both the Information Commissioner's and the High Court's view on the sections of the Freedom of Information Act 1997 that had been raised in the High court; Kearns J stated that in his view "the learned judge was correct to say that these propositions were based on established principles". Kearns J also agreed with Gilligan J in his interpretations of Section 21 and Section 26 of the Freedom of Information Act as well as the duties of the information commissioner. Kearns J stated that the High court was "absolutely correct" in its findings whilst stating that he did not believe that the Commissioner needed to conduct an exhaustive analysis before applying the public interest provision.

This dismissed the appellant's contention that the Commissioner had failed to carry out an analysis on proper evidence under Section 21. Although Kearns J stated that he would allow the appeal based on Section 53 of the Education Act, it was seen a "stand alone" piece of legislation which should not be interpreted under the Freedom of Information Act. Fennelly J stated that "I am in agreement with Kearns J that the appeal should be dismissed insofar as it relates to any matter other than section 53."

Ultimately, Kearns J allowed the appeal on the point raised with regards to section 53 of the Education Act 1998 but dismissed the grounds of appeal regarding to sections 21, 26 and 32(1)(a) of the Freedom of information Act 1997. Thus, the court ruled that the statutory privilege to deny access to the data of schools superseded the various Freedom of Information provisions.
