= Jacob Söderman =

Finnish politician (born 1938)

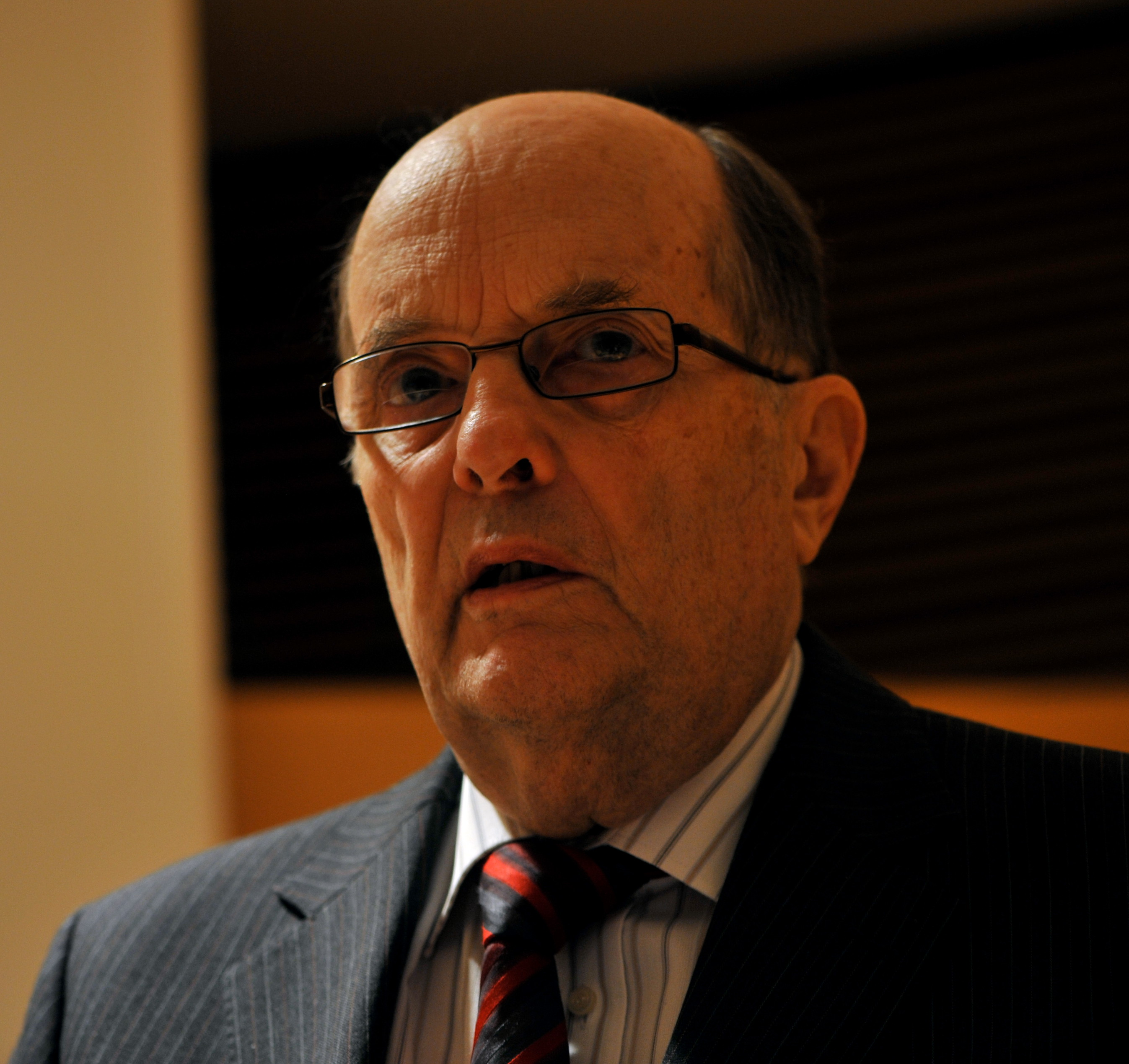

Finnish Member of Parliament
- In office 1972–1982; 2007–2011

European Ombudsman
- In office 1995–2003

Parliamentary Ombudsman of Finland
- In office 1989–1995

governor of Uusimaa Province
- In office 1982–1989

Minister of Social Affairs and Health
- In office 1982

Minister of Justice
- In office 1971

Personal details
- Born: 19 March 1938 (age 88) Helsinki, Finland
- Party: Social Democratic Party of Finland

Jacob-Magnus (Jacob) Söderman (born 19 March 1938 in Helsinki, Finland) is a Finnish politician who served as Finnish Member of Parliament in 1972–1982 and again in 2007–2011. Söderman is a member of the Social Democratic Party of Finland and served as Minister of Justice (in October 1971), Minister of Social Affairs and Health (1982), governor of Uusimaa Province (1982–89), Parliamentary Ombudsman of Finland (1989–95) and the first European Ombudsman (1995–2003). Söderman returned to the Parliament in Autumn 2007 when MP Tuula Haatainen resigned in order to become a deputy city manager of Helsinki.

Söderman was the president of the Council for Mass Media in Finland in 2003–2005, a member of the board of the University of Helsinki 2004–2006 and member of the Group of Wise Persons 2005–2006.

== Honours ==
- Grand Cross of Bernardo O'Higgins Decoration conferred by Chile 1993
- Grand Cross of the Lions Decoration of Finland 1995
- European Information Association Award for Achievement in European Information 1996
- Honorary Doctorate of Political Sciences, Åbo Akademi University, Finland 1998
- Honorary Doctorate in Law, University of Lapland 1999
- Special Award for the European Ombudsman's Contribution to Dissemination of Information by the Ministry of Education of Finland 2000
- Alexis de Tocqueville Prize, European Institute of Public Administration (EIPA) 2001
- Knight of the French Legion of Honour 2002
- Snellman Prize, Finnish Periodical Publishers Association 2002
- Expatriate of the Year Award 2003
- Consumer of the Year Award, The Finnish Consumers' Association 2005
- Codex medaljen 2006
- Chydenius Prize 2006
- Finnish Humanist Union Prize 2007
- Nordic Administrative Union/Finnish association Prize 2007

Preceded by none	European Ombudsman; 1995-2003	Succeeded by Nikiforos Diamandouros
