= Kevin Murphy (ombudsman) =

Ombudsman of Ireland (1937–2012)

Ombudsman
- In office 1 November 1994 – 31 May 2003
- Preceded by: Michael Mills
- Succeeded by: Emily O'Reilly

Information Commissioner
- In office 21 April 1998 – 31 May 2003
- Preceded by: New office
- Succeeded by: Emily O'Reilly

Personal details
- Born: 9 April 1937
- Died: 6 March 2012 (aged 75) Dublin, Ireland

Kevin Murphy (9 April 1937 – 5 March 2012) was an Irish civil servant who served as Ombudsman from 1994 to 2003 and Information Commissioner from 1998 to 2003.

== Career ==
He was educated at Synge Street CBS before joining the civil service in 1955.

Murphy served in the Department of Industry and Commerce, in the Department of Finance, and joined the newly created Department of the Public Service in 1973. He became Secretary-General of the latter in 1983. In 1987, he was appointed Secretary-General, Public Service Management and Development, at the Department of Finance, when the functions of the Department of the Public Service were transferred.

On 1 November 1994, Murphy was appointed as Ombudsman by the president, Mary Robinson, upon nomination by both Houses of the Oireachtas. In this position, he dealt with complaints against government departments, local authorities, and other public bodies. Under the terms of the Freedom of Information Act 1997, he also held the office of Information Commissioner from April 1998. The Information Commissioner may review decisions of public bodies in relation to requests for access to information.

He was nominated for a second term in 2000. Before his retirement, he wrote a commentary on the government's amendments to Freedom of Information Act. Michael McDowell, the Minister for Justice, Equality and Law Reform, criticised him for straying across the line.

In June 2003, Emily O'Reilly succeeded him in both posts. Although Murphy retired from employment in 2002 when he turned 65, he continued in public life, including sitting on a committee to appoint members of the new Irish Press Commission in 2006.

== Personal life ==
Murphy was educated at Synge Street CBS.

He was married with four children and died 6 March 2012, aged 75.
