= Nikiforos Diamandouros =

Greek academic (born 1942)

Nikiforos Diamandouros Νικηφόρος Διαμαντούρος
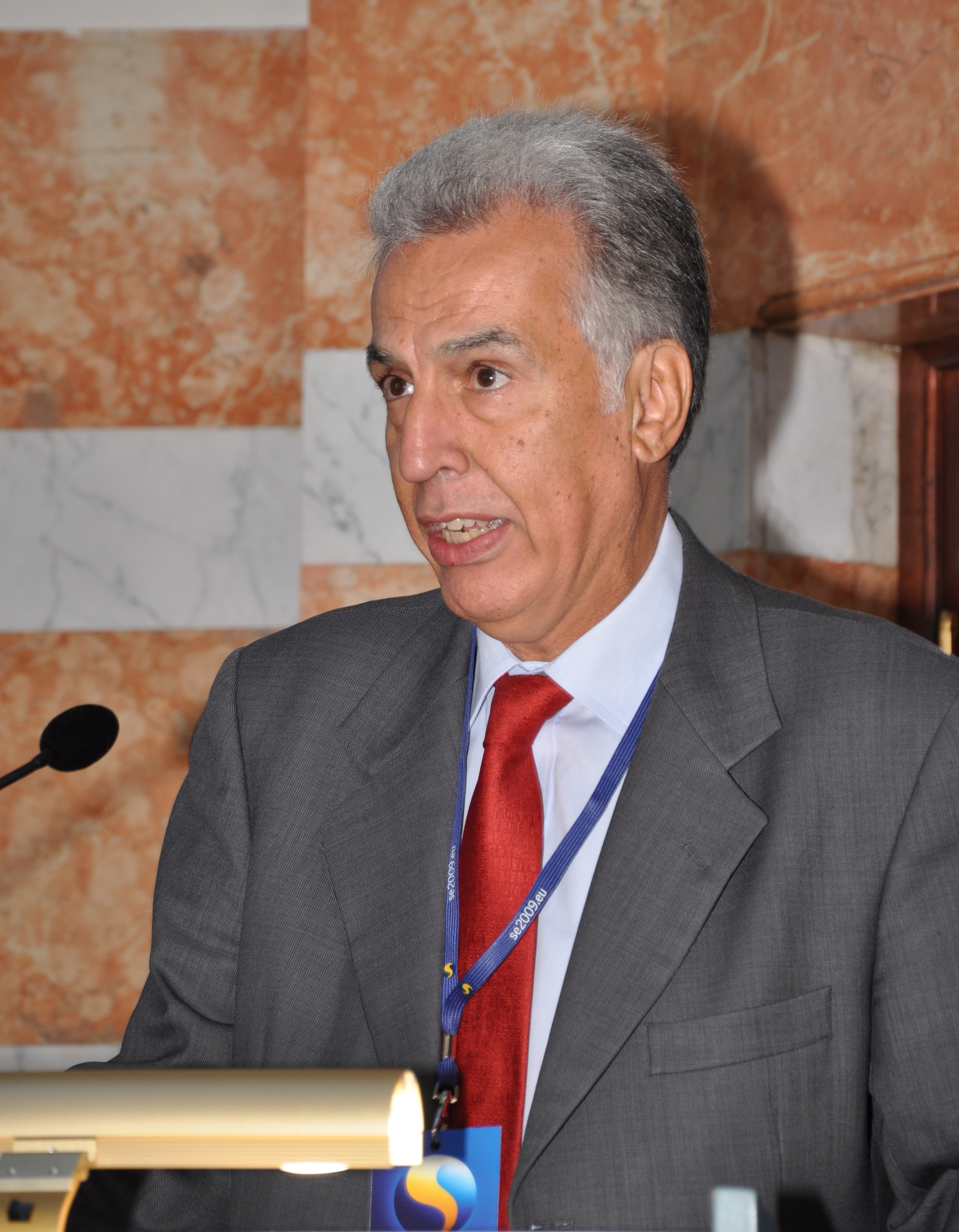

Ombudsman of the European Union
- In office 1 April 2003 – 1 October 2013
- Preceded by: Jacob Söderman
- Succeeded by: Emily O'Reilly

Personal details
- Born: 25 June 1942 (age 84) Athens, Greece
- Education: Indiana University Bloomington; Columbia University

Paraskevas Nikiforos Diamandouros (Greek: Νικηφόρος Διαμαντούρος, Greek pronunciation: [niciˈforos ðʝamanˈduros]) (born June 25, 1942) is a Greek academic who was the first National Ombudsman of Greece from 1998 to 2003 and has been Ombudsman for the European Union from April 2003 to October 2013. He was re-elected as European Ombudsman in 2005 and again in 2010.

== Personal life ==
Diamandouros was born in Athens, Greece, on June 25, 1942. His interests include classical music, film, reading, and writing. He has published writings on state-building, and nation-building, on democratisation and on the relationship between culture and politics. He has also written widely about the politics and history of Greece and Southern Europe. Diamandouros is married and has two children.

== Academia ==
In 1963 Diamandouros graduated Indiana University in 1963 with a Bachelor of Arts. He then attended Columbia University, New York City, where he was awarded n Masters of Arts in 1965, an M.Phil in 1969 and a Doctor of Philosophy in 1972. From 1973 to 1978 he held a research position at Columbia University and a teaching post at the State University of New York - Orange County Community College.

He took up the role of Director of Development at Athens College, Athens, Greece in 1980. In 1983 he left that role and moved to the position of Program Director for Western Europe and the Near and Middle East at the Social Science Research Council, New York, a post he held until 1988. He also served as president of the Modern Greek Studies Association from 1985 until 1988.

From 1988 to 1991 Diamandouros was Director of the Greek Institute for International and Strategic Studies, a research organisation in Athens. In 1992 he became president of the Greek Political Science Association, a role he held for six years. From 1988 to 1996 he also returned to the Social Science Research Council, this time in the role of co-chair of the Subcommittee on Southern Europe. In 1995 he became director and chairman of the Greek National Centre for Social Research, serving in those capacities until 1998. In 1997 he was briefly appointed visiting professor of political science at the Juan March Centre for Advanced Studies in the Social Sciences in Madrid, Spain.

Diamandouros is emeritus professor of comparative politics at the University of Athens Department of Political Science and Public Administration. He is also joint General Editor of an Oxford University Press series on New Southern Europe and has received research grants from Fulbright and the National Endowment for the Humanities.

== Political appointments ==
Diamandouros was appointed a member of the Greek National Commission on Human Rights in 1999. In 2000 he became a member of Greece's National Council for Administrative Reform, and participated in the Bilderberg conference.

He was the first National Ombudsman of Greece, serving from 1998 to 2003. On April 1, 2003, he was elected Ombudsman for the European Union to serve out the remainder of Söderman's term. He was elected to a full term of his own in 2005, and to a second term in 2010. He was succeeded by Emily O'Reilly.

Diamandouros has received the Gold Cross of Merit and the Order of the Phoenix.

Political offices
Preceded by Jacob Söderman	Ombudsman of the European Union; 2003–2013	Succeeded by Emily O'Reilly
