= Peter Tyndall =

Irish public official, former ombudsman

Ombudsman
- In office 2013–2021
- Preceded by: Emily O'Reilly
- Succeeded by: Ger Deering

Information Commissioner
- In office 2013–2021
- Preceded by: Emily O'Reilly
- Succeeded by: Ger Deering

Personal details
- Born: Dublin, Ireland

Peter Tyndall is a former Irish public servant who served as the Ombudsman and the Information Commissioner of Ireland from 2013 to 2021.

== Career ==
Tyndall is a Dubliner who lived in Wales for more than 30 years, where he occupied a variety of senior positions in housing and social care. He has also been Head of Education and Culture for the Welsh Local Government Association, Chief Executive of the Arts Council of Wales, and latterly the Public Services Ombudsman for Wales from 2008 to 2013. He was Chairman of the British and Irish Ombudsman Association for two years, and is a member of the World and European Boards of the International Ombudsman Institute.

Tyndall has an M.Sc. degree in Strategic Management from Cardiff University.

== Ombudsman ==
Tyndall was nominated in November 2013. He received his warrant of appointment from president Michael D. Higgins on 2 December 2013. He was reappointed in 2019.

As Ombudsman, Tyndall was an ex officio member of the Standards in Public Office Commission.

As Ombudsman, Peter Tyndall published a number of reports including:

- A Good Death (June 2014): a report into end of care life in Irish hospitals.
- Learning to Get Better (May 2015): an investigation into how public hospitals handle complaints
- Taking Stock (July 2017): an investigation into complaint handling and issues identified in complaints made about the Child and Family Agency (Tusla). The reports made a number of recommendations which are being implemented. Follow-up reports to 'Learning to Get Better' and 'A Good Death' were published in 2018.
- Opportunity Lost (November 2017) was an investigation into the administration of the Magdalen Restorative Justice Scheme (a redress scheme for women who worked in Magdalene laundries). The report was critical of how the Department of Justice and Equality administered the scheme. The Ombudsman's recommendations were initially rejected by the department. However, in April 2018 the Minister of Justice and Equality, and the Taoiseach announced that there would be full implementation of the Ombudsman's recommendations.

In November 2016 Peter Tyndall was elected President of the International Ombudsman Institute at the 11th IOI World Conference in Bangkok.

== Retirement ==
He retired from office at the end of 2021. After leaving office, he stated his belief that there was no appetite among politicians for the introduction of stronger ethics laws in Ireland, and that he had "never known anything more unfit for purpose than our current ethics legislation."

== Personal life ==
Tyndall is married with three daughters.
