= Teresa Anjinho =

Portuguese legal expert

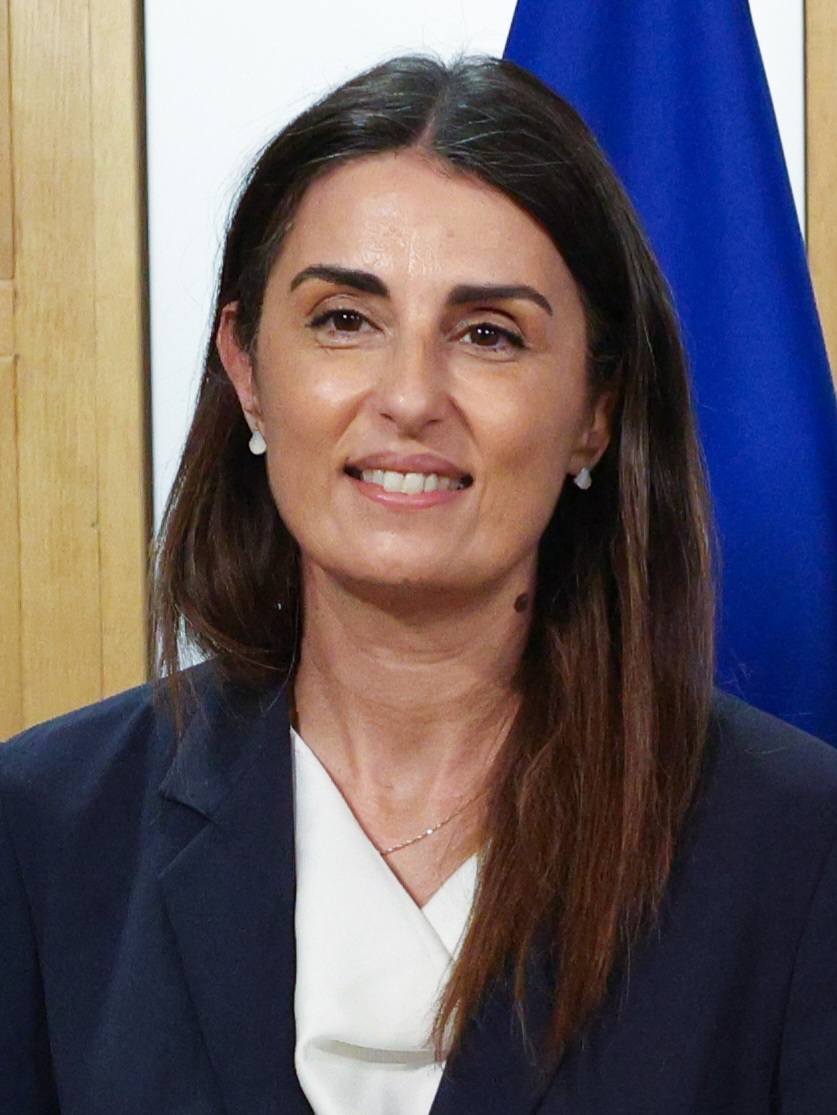
- Anjinho in 2025

European Ombudsman
- Incumbent
- Assumed office 27 February 2025
- Preceded by: Emily O'Reilly

Deputy Ombudsman of Portugal
- In office 2 November 2017 – 2 November 2022
- Ombudsman: Maria Lúcia Amaral

Secretary of State for Justice
- In office 30 October 2015 – 26 November 2015
- Prime Minister: Pedro Passos Coelho
- Minister: Fernando Negrão

Member of the Assembly of the Republic
- In office 20 June 2011 – 22 October 2015
- Constituency: Aveiro

Personal details
- Born: Teresa Maria de Moura Anjinho; 3 October 1974 (age 51) Coimbra, Portugal
- Party: CDS – People's Party
- Domestic partner(s): Ricardo Baptista Leite (since 2014)
- Children: 3
- Education: University of Coimbra; University of Padua; Maastricht University; NOVA University Lisbon
- Occupation: Lawyer

Teresa Maria de Moura Anjinho (born 3 October 1974) is a Portuguese legal expert, academic researcher, and public servant known for her extensive contributions to human rights, international law, and public policy. Anjinho is currently the European Ombudswoman. She was elected to serve as EU Ombudsman for the period between 2025 and 2029.

She served as a member of the Supervisory Committee of the European Anti-Fraud Office (OLAF) and is the Ambassador of the Alliance SDG Portugal, where she promotes Sustainable Development Goal 16: Peace, Justice, and Strong Institutions.

== Early life and education ==
Teresa Anjinho was born in Portugal and demonstrated an early interest in law and governance. She pursued her higher education at the Faculty of Law of the University of Coimbra, obtaining her law degree in 1997. During her studies, she participated in the Erasmus programme at the University of La Sapienza in Rome.

She continued her academic journey by completing the European master's degree in Human Rights and Democratization at the University of Padua in Italy in 1998, focusing on the intersection of human rights and democratization. Additionally, she enrolled as a Ph.D. candidate in international criminal law at the Faculty of Law of the Nova University of Lisbon, although her candidacy was later suspended.

Anjinho is fluent in English and French and has proficiency in Italian and Spanish.

== Personal life ==
Since 2014, she is in a relationship with the Portuguese doctor and politician, Ricardo Baptista Leite. She has three sons.

== Professional and political career ==
Teresa Anjinho has had a distinguished career in public service, academia, and international engagement, holding several high-profile positions in Portugal and Europe. As Deputy Ombudsman of Portugal (2017–2022), she oversaw complaint handling in key areas such as environmental issues, public essential services, security, justice, education, and health. In addition, she represented Portugal in the National Human Rights Commission and was elected as the European representative for the GANHRI Working Group on Business and Human Rights. Previously, she served as Secretary of State for Justice for less than a month in 2015, in the shortest-lived Portuguese government. Between 2011 and 2015, she was a member of the Assembly of the Republic for the CDS-PP, actively engaging in parliamentary committees on Human Rights, Foreign Affairs, Equality, and Financial Aid Measures. She also participated in the Parliamentary Inquiry Commission on the BES/GES case and the Subcommittee on Equality. Earlier in her career, she served as a counselor for the Justice of the Peace Council and as a member of the Municipal Assembly of Coimbra in 2017 for a short time.

In academia, Anjinho has significantly contributed to legal studies and human rights discourse. Since 2024, she has been an Associate Researcher at the Center for Advanced Legal Studies at Lusófona University and a Researcher at the CEDIS – Investigation Centre on Law and Society at Nova School of Law. She has taught subjects such as International Humanitarian Law, Constitutional Law, Social Equality Law, and Women's Rights and has been a guest lecturer at institutions like the University of Coimbra and Nova School of Law. Her academic contributions include participation in Post-Graduation Courses on Human Rights and Master Courses on Women's Studies. She also contributed to drafting Legislative Proposal No. 72/IX, which adapted Portuguese criminal law to the International Criminal Court's Rome Statute, and authored national reports on access to justice in gender equality and anti-discrimination law.

On the international stage, Anjinho has participated in several electoral observation missions under the OSCE, including supervising municipal elections in Kosovo (2000, 2002), parliamentary elections in Russia (1999), and parliamentary elections in Bosnia-Herzegovina (1998). These missions focused on ensuring fair and transparent electoral processes in post-conflict and transitional settings. Additionally, she has served within the European Union, contributing to human rights and democratization initiatives at the European Commission in 1999 and working with the European Parliament's Committee on Civil Liberties and Internal Affairs in 1998, focusing on human rights-related matters.

Teresa Anjinho was sworn in as European Ombudsman on 27 February 2025, following her election by the European Parliament in December 2024.

=== Controversy over Secretary-General appointment ===
In late October 2025, Anjinho appointed her former chief of staff, Greek lawyer Lampros Papadias, as Secretary-General of the institution, the highest administrative post at the European Ombudsman's office, which had remained vacant for two years and carries a monthly salary of between 20,000 and 25,000 euros. Papadias, who had previously been a middle manager and had worked with Anjinho at the European Anti-Fraud Office (OLAF), was selected over thirteen other candidates.

Anjinho personally sat on the three-member selection panel that conducted the interviews, before exercising the final appointing authority on the same case. According to French newspaper Libération, she resisted internal calls to recuse herself from the process, amid fears it could create the appearance of a conflict of interest.

The affair, first revealed by Euractiv in November 2025, was picked up by several other outlets, including Libération and Il Fatto Quotidiano, the latter drawing a parallel with the controversy surrounding the appointment of Martin Selmayr as Secretary-General of the European Commission in 2018.

Parliament's Committee on Budgetary Control sent fresh questions to the Ombudsman in January 2026 asking her "to shed light on the promotion of her chief of staff to secretary general," according to Italian MEP Pasquale Tridico of The Left group, who is Parliament's rapporteur for the Ombudsman's budgetary discharge that year. Tridico said: "The credibility and role of the institution itself is at stake: How can it investigate allegations of maladministration in other EU bodies if doubts of favouritism can be cast on it in such an important procedure?" The committee requested all documents related to the procedure to appoint the selection board.

Spanish socialist MEP José Cepeda said "the direct involvement of Ms. Anjinho in the selection process understandably raises questions that must be clarified," adding that the committee's first step was to request all relevant information from the institution so it could form its own independent assessment. Nick Aiossa, director of Transparency International EU, said that "given the past scandals of Martin Selmayr and Markus Pieper there must be greater transparency of the recruitment of senior posts". In May 2026, MEPs also criticised Anjinho's refusal to hand over certain key recruitment-related documents, arguing that Parliament was entitled to them.

In response, Anjinho insisted the process was transparent and done by the book.

== Publications and legal contributions ==
Teresa Anjinho has contributed significantly to legal scholarship and public policy:

- Drafted key legislative frameworks, including those aligning Portuguese law with international standards.
- Participated in the Jean Pictet International Competition on International Humanitarian Law.
- Authored numerous reports and articles on topics ranging from gender equality to AI ethics.
