= Disappearance of Elizabeth Clarke =

Missing person case in Ireland

- Born: 1988 or 1989
- Disappeared: November 2013 (aged 24); Navan, County Meath, Ireland

Elizabeth Clarke is an Irish woman who disappeared from her home in Navan, County Meath in November 2013. Her disappearance was not reported until January 2015. Gardaí suspect she was murdered following a prolonged period of mistreatment.

== Background ==
Elizabeth Clarke was originally from Portrane, County Dublin. She had also lived in Bettystown, County Meath. At the time of her disappearance she was 24 years old and living in Navan, County Meath. She was the mother of two children and her family described her as "vulnerable".

== Disappearance ==
Clarke was last seen in the Claremont Estate in Navan in November 2013 at the home of her ex-partner Kevin Stanley and his father Larry Stanley. Larry Stanley claimed Clarke left the house voluntarily after the end of her relationship with Kevin Stanley. Despite being last seen in 2013, she was not reported missing until January 2015. She disappeared without her phone, passport, or ATM card.

Clarke was estranged from her family who hadn't seen her since 2012 and it was when she didn't attend the funeral of her grandfather that the family realised she was missing. Her family do not believe that she would willingly leave her children.

== Investigation ==
Gardaí conducted various searches for Clarke over the years and searches were also carried out by cadaver dogs at the request of her family. There were no reported sightings of her following the report of her disappearance.

In 2016 Larry Stanley, the father of Clarke's partner Kevin Stanley, was photographed tearing down missing posters for Clarke in the Claremont estate where she had been living at the time of the disappearance.

On 7 February 2025, Gardaí announced that they were upgrading the investigation to that of a murder inquiry. On the same day Gardaí began searches of a home in Navan that they believed was connected to the disappearance. It was reported that the house being searched was also the subject of a separate Garda investigation in relation to rape and neglect of children and a vulnerable adult. On 10 February 2025, the search of the property in Navan was stood down with Gardaí not releasing results of the search for operational reasons.

In April 2025, Clarke's mother Noeleen Bieninda made a direct appeal to those who might have known what happened to her daughter.
