= Emily O'Reilly =

Irish author and journalist, national and EU Ombudsman

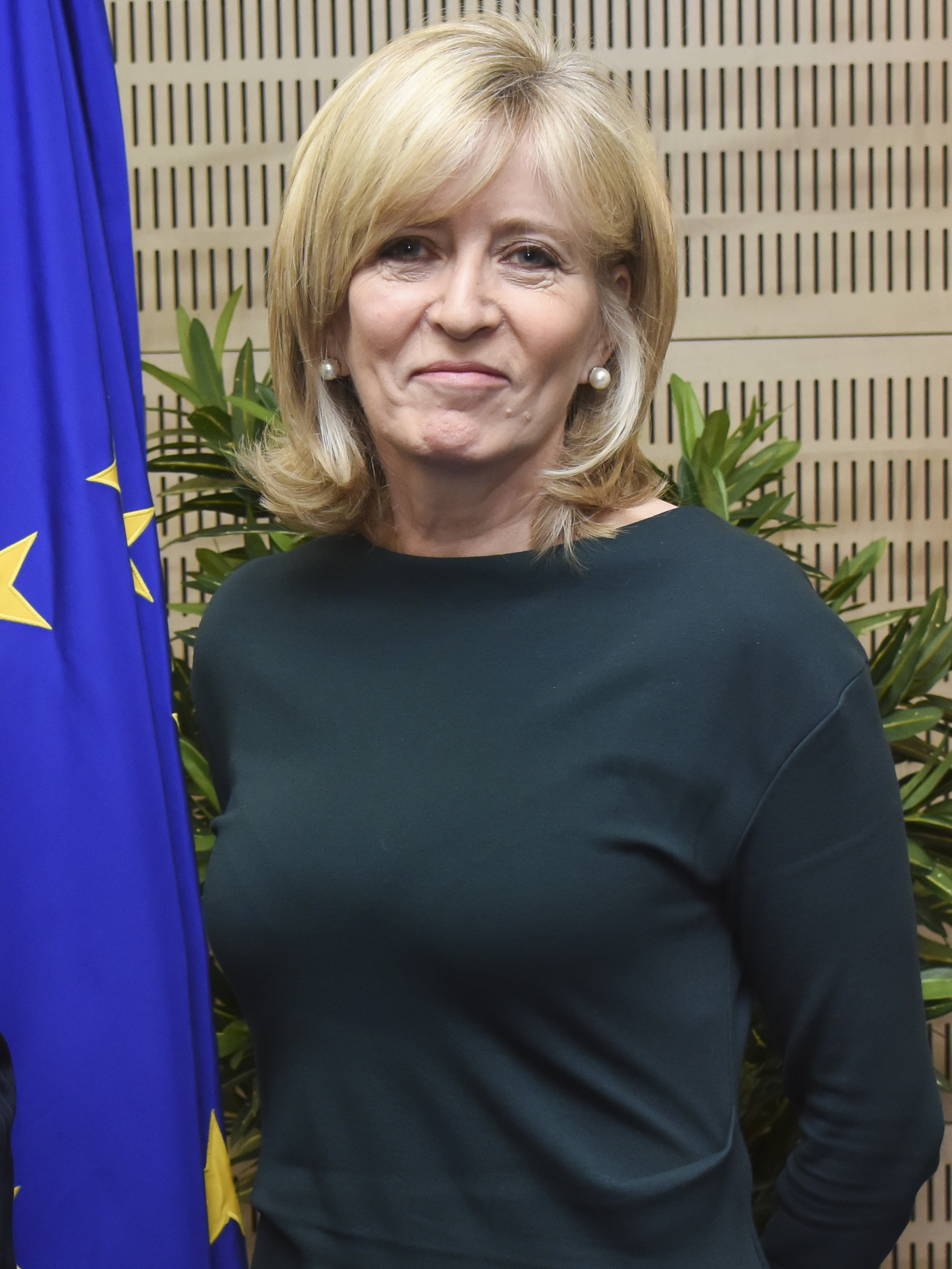
- O'Reilly in 2015

European Ombudsman
- In office 1 October 2013 – 31 December 2024
- Preceded by: Nikiforos Diamandouros
- Succeeded by: Teresa Anjinho

Irish Ombudsman
- In office 1 June 2003 – 29 September 2013
- Preceded by: Kevin Murphy
- Succeeded by: Peter Tyndall

Information Commissioner
- In office 1 June 2003 – 29 September 2013
- Preceded by: Kevin Murphy
- Succeeded by: Peter Tyndall

Emily O'Reilly is an author and former journalist and broadcaster who became Ireland's first female Ombudsman in 2003, succeeding Kevin Murphy. On 3 July 2013, she was voted European Ombudsman by the European Parliament. She was re-elected in 2014 and in 2019, in each case for a mandate of five more years. She was educated at University College Dublin, Trinity College Dublin, and Harvard University, where she was awarded a Nieman Fellowship in journalism.

== Early life ==
O'Reilly is from Tullamore, County Offaly and her family moved to Dublin when she was 8 years old.

== Journalism ==
She began her career as a journalist in the 1970s. She held senior positions with The Irish Press and the Sunday Tribune, as well as serving as a political columnist at The Sunday Times and as the Political Editor of The Sunday Business Post. In 1991 she made an extended appearance on the British television discussion programme After Dark, alongside among others Patrick Cosgrave, J. P. Donleavy, David Norris and Francis Stuart.

In 1998, she became the editor of Magill magazine. She resigned in September 1999 when the magazine's sister publication, In Dublin, was banned by the Censorship of Publications Appeal Board for advertising brothels and prostitution services. O'Reilly was also a broadcaster on RTÉ and Today FM.

O'Reilly is the author of three books: Candidate: The Truth Behind the Presidential Campaign (1991), about President of Ireland Mary Robinson; Masterminds of the Right (1992) about political Catholicism in Ireland; and a biography, Veronica Guerin (1998).

In the course of her journalistic career, she won two awards: Journalist of the Year and Woman Journalist of the Year.

== Irish Ombudsman and Information Commissioner ==
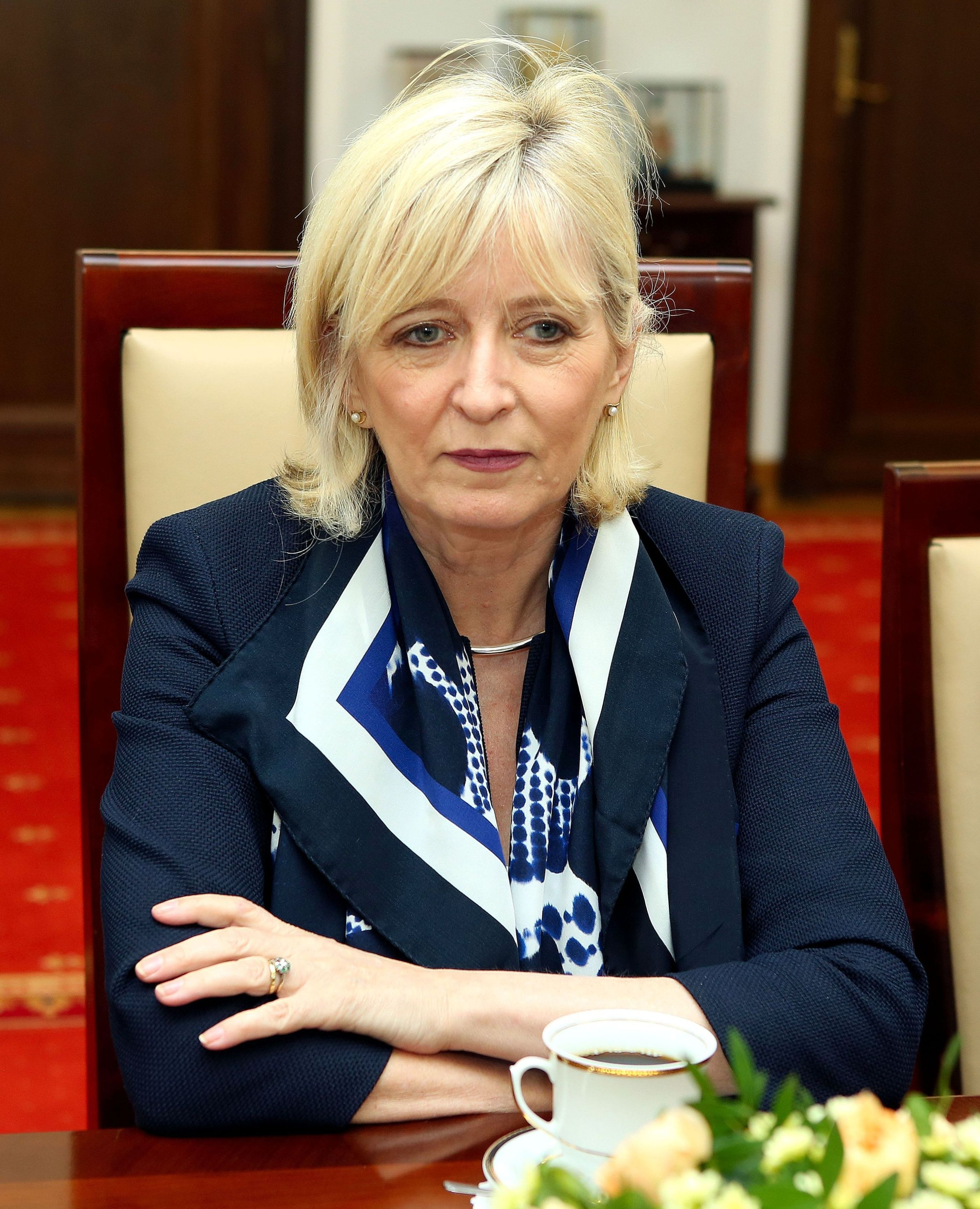
O'Reilly before the Polish Senate in 2014

In April 2003, she was proposed as the Irish Ombudsman and Information Commissioner. On 1 June 2003, she received her warrant of appointment from the President of Ireland, Mary McAleese, at Áras an Uachtaráin. She said of her job title, "I will be an ombudswoman but will have no difficulty in being referred to as either".

In 2007, as Information Commissioner, she was appointed to the additional position of Commissioner for Environmental Information under the Access to Information on the Environment Regulations. She was appointed for a second term in 2009.

In December 2013, she resigned from these positions and was succeeded by Peter Tyndall.

=== Transparency and accountability of Irish public bodies ===
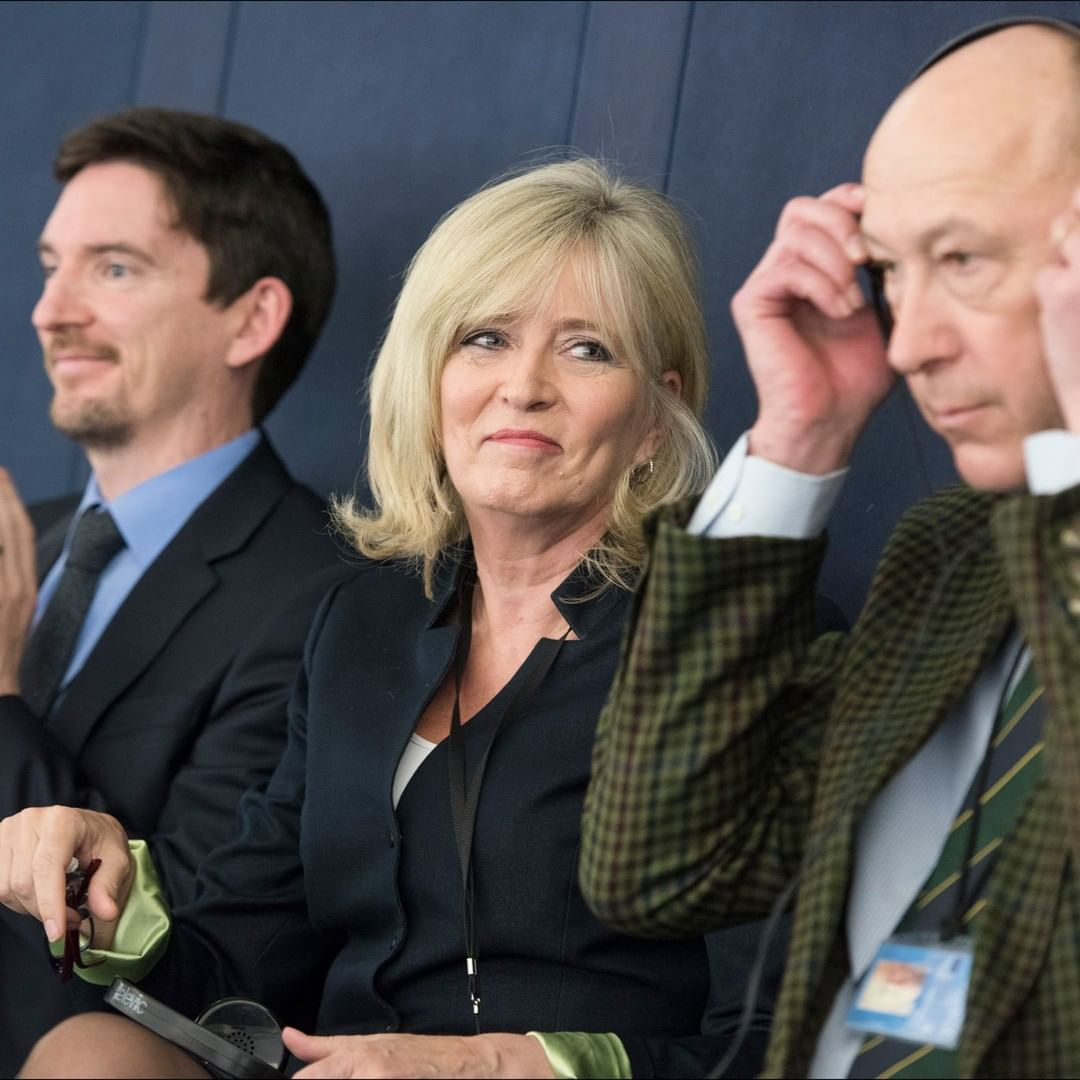
O'Reilly and husband Stephen Ryan (right) in 2019

In a speech delivered in Dublin on 20 June 2006 to the Institute of Public Administration, O'Reilly criticised "some service providers, both public and private" for retreating from dealing personally with the public through the use of call centres and the Internet. She mentioned the Irish Revenue Commissioners in this context, pointing out that a significant proportion of the clients of these bodies "do not have access to the web" and therefore the level of personal contact is inadequate as a consequence. She also believed that public access to information under the Freedom of Information Act had been "excessively curtailed", often in order to protect sectional interests, such as the performance of schools. She advised that the Act should be extended to include a number of public bodies previously exempted from the law, including the Garda Síochána, the Central Bank of Ireland and the National Asset Management Agency and that fees charged were a further inhibitor.

== European Ombudsman ==
O'Reilly was appointed European Ombudsman by the European Parliament in 2013, and re-appointed in 2014 and 2019. O'Reilly's third and final term ended in 2024 when she was succeeded by Teresa Anjinho.

== Bibliography ==
- Veronica Guerin. Vintage. 1998. ISBN 0-09-976151-3.
- Candidate: The Truth Behind the Presidential Campaign. Attic Press. 1991. ISBN 1-85594-021-3.
- Masterminds of the Right. Attic Press. 1992. ISBN 1-85594-044-2.
