= European Ombudsman =

Ombudsman for the European Union

- European Ombudsman logo

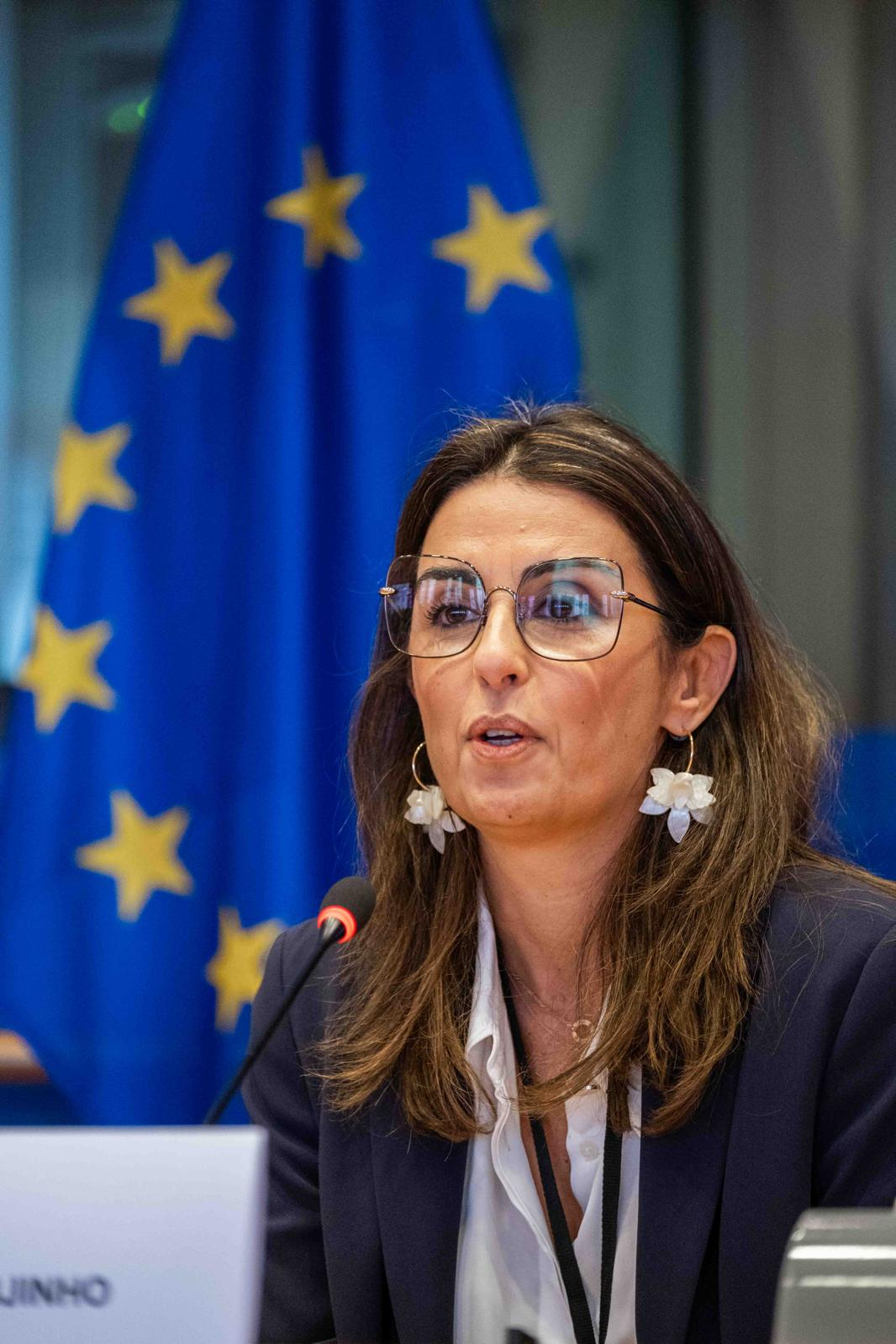
- Incumbent; Teresa Anjinho since 27 February 2025
- Appointer: European Parliament
- Inaugural holder: Jacob Söderman
- Formation: 1995
- Website: ombudsman.europa.eu

The European Ombudsman is an inter-institutional body of the European Union tasked with investigating complaints made by people, businesses and organisations concerning potential maladministration within EU bodies and institutions.

The current Ombudswoman is Teresa Anjinho. The European Ombudsman has offices in Strasbourg and Brussels.

== History ==
The European Ombudsman was established by the Maastricht Treaty. The first holder of the position, Jacob Söderman of Finland, was elected by the European Parliament in 1995. The current Ombudsman, Teresa Anjinho of Portugal, took office on 27 February 2025.

== Appointment ==
The European Ombudsman is elected by the European Parliament, for a renewable term of 5 years. At the beginning of each parliamentary term, the European Parliament calls for nominations for the position. Each candidate must be supported by at least 40 members of the European Parliament. Following a vote, the candidate receiving the majority of votes cast is elected.

At the request of Parliament, the Ombudsman may be removed by the Court of Justice if "(s)he no longer fulfils the conditions required for the performance of his duties or if (s)he is guilty of serious misconduct".

== Remit and powers ==
Any EU citizen or entity may ask the Ombudsman to investigate potential maladministration in an EU institution. Maladministration can include problems such as: administrative irregularities, unfairness, discrimination, abuse of power, failure to reply, refusal to provide information and unnecessary delays. The Ombudsman cannot investigate the European Court of Justice in its judicial capacity, the General Court, the Civil Service Tribunal, national and regional administrations (even where EU law is concerned), judiciaries, private individuals or corporations.

In addition to the core function of investigating individual cases, the Ombudsman can proactively carry out "strategic inquiries" into wider, systemic issues.

The Ombudsman has no binding powers to compel compliance with their rulings, but the overall level of compliance is high. The Ombudsman primarily relies on the power of persuasion and publicity.

== Cases ==
It is a right of an EU citizen, according to the EU treaties, to take a case to the Ombudsman.

The ombudsman received 2,392 complaints in the year 2023 and opened 393 investigations into alleged maladministration. The largest number of complaints in 2023 came from Spain (402), followed by Germany with 241.

According to the Ombudsman's own reports, 63% of complaints in 2023 were related to the European Commission. 12% related to the European Personnel Selection Office (EPSO) and 4% to the European Parliament. The Council of the European Union accounted for 2%.

== Main subjects of action ==
The main mission guiding the European Ombudsman's work is the "right to good administration" that is recognised as a human right in the EU. The European Ombudsman helps citizens, companies and associations that face problems with EU administration. The main areas of inquiries of the European Ombudsman relate to the transparency of EU administration; transparency and accountability in EU decision-making; lobbying transparency; ethical issues; fundamental rights; recruitment into the EU civil service; and citizen participation in EU decision-making.

=== Transparency and the right of access EU documents ===
Complaints concerning a lack of transparency are the most common category of complaints received by the European Ombudsman, representing around 30% of complaints. They are mainly related to the refusal of EU institution(s) to grant documents upon a citizen's request. This right of citizens to access EU documents is enshrined in Articles 42 of the Charter of Fundamental Rights of the EU and Article 15 of the Treaty on the Functioning of the European Union. In case a citizen is prevented from accessing the documents they requested, they can turn to the European Ombudsman for help.

=== Lobbying transparency ===
The European Ombudsman works to ensure that the EU's democratic decision-making process is characterised by the highest transparency standards. Special attention is given to how interest groups engage with and try to influence the EU institutions. Lobbying transparency is one of the main topics of action at the European Ombudsman, and through various strategic initiatives, the Ombudsman tries to mitigate potential conflicts of interest.

=== Ethical issues ===
Ethics-related complaints to the European Ombudsman include potential conflicts of interest as well as "revolving doors" situations, where someone working in the public sector moves to a closely related job in the private sector. The European Ombudsman has argued that the EU administration must meet with "gold standards when it comes to ethical behaviour".

=== Fundamental rights ===
A key part of European Ombudsman work is to ensure that EU institutions respect fundamental rights. For example, the Ombudsman has dealt with inquiries related to the rights of persons with disabilities and the treatment of migrants.

=== Citizen participation ===
In its role as a moderator and bridge between citizens and the EU institutions, the European Ombudsman also promotes citizens' participation and involvement in European politics by, for example, demanding greater transparency so that citizens can follow the proceedings, or by promoting the implementation of more participatory decision-making processes.

== European Ombudsman procedures ==
The European Ombudsman can conduct inquiries following the receipt of a complaint as well as on their own initiative. Using powers conferred by the Statue of the European Ombudsman, the Ombudsman can require the institution concerned to provide information, inspect the document held by the institution and testimony from officials.

The European Ombudsman complements the work of the courts, as it offers an alternative way for citizens to resolve disputes with the EU administration, without incurring costs such as lawyers or fees. However, the European Ombudsman has no power to make legally binding decisions, so it can only act as a moderator in disputes.

Whenever the Ombudsman finds maladministration, they can make problem-solving proposals, recommendations and suggestions. The main way in which the European Ombudsman tries to resolve a problem is by proposing a solution, that both the complainant and the institution concerned would be willing to accept. This method may result in a quick and positive outcome for the complainant. However, this method is less effective when it comes to driving systemic change in the public interest. If the institution rejects the proposed solution, the European Ombudsman can proceed to the powers of Article 4 of the Statute and draft recommendations for the institution concerned. These recommendations are published on the Ombudsman's website, publicity and raising public attention to the maladministration identified. To address the issue the European Ombudsman can choose to publish suggestions for improvements, for the institution concerned. These public suggestions help identify problems and suggest corrections that can create systemic improvements for the public interest. If, at the end of an investigation, an institution rejects the Ombudsman's final findings or recommendations, the Ombudsman can criticise it publicly, highlighting the importance of the issue, and can also make a special report to the European Parliament.

Many of the complaints sent to the European Ombudsman are outside of its mandate. In 2023, the European Ombudsman processed 1,506 outside the mandate complaints. The highest number of out of mandate complaints came from Spain, Poland and Germany.

The European Ombudsman tries to reply to all complaints submitted, even the ones outside the mandate. In those cases, the European Ombudsman helps complainants by explaining the Ombudsman's mandate and, advising about other bodies to whom they can direct their complaint. If the complainant agrees, the European Ombudsman can also forward the complaint to members of the European Network of Ombudsmen (ENO).

== Advice, complaints, and inquiries throughout the years ==
	2014	2015	2017	2020	2023
"People helped by the European Ombudsman"	23 072	17 033	15 837	20 302	17 500
"Advice given through the Interactive Guide on the Ombudsman's website"	19 170	13 966	12 521	16 892	14 423
"New complaints managed"	2 079	2 077	2 181	2 148	2 392
"Requests for information replied to by Ombudsman"	1 823	1 060	1 135	1 262	735
"Inquiries opened"	342	261	447	370	398
"Inquiries opened based on complaints"	325	249	433	365	393
"Own-initiative inquiries opened"	17	12	14	5	5
"Inquiries closed"	400	277	363	394	375
"Complaint-based inquiries closed"	387	261	348	392	369
"Own-initiative inquiries closed"	13	16	15	2	3

The high number of maladministration complaints made to European Ombudsman in parallel with recent scholarship, show that "the ombudsman is an important platform protecting the rights of citizens and promoting democratic values at the EU level".

== Effectiveness, impact, and achievements ==
Since its inception in 1995, the European Ombudsman has, identified itself as an institution with a "good governance" mission, promoting this cause and its own place within the EU institutional system. It is active towards serving the wider public interest and one of its goals is to achieve "tangible improvements for complainants and the public vis-a-vis the EU administration" The European Ombudsman is responsive towards complaints from individuals, companies and associations, replying to and resolving complaints related to administration problems in the EU institutions. The European Ombudsman also takes an autonomous and active approach in "helping the institutions to improve the quality of the service they provide" by making problem-solving proposals, recommendations, and suggestions.

Assessing the European Ombudsman's effectiveness must take into consideration quantitative data, such as the statistics on the responsiveness to complaints and statistics on own-initiative inquiries as well as, qualitative data to better understand how EU institutions react to the Ombudsman's proposals.

For this purpose, complying with Article 4(5) of the Statute, the European Ombudsman submits a comprehensive report to the European Parliament at the end of each annual session, with information on the rate of EU institutions' compliance with their recommendations.

=== European Ombudsman's responsiveness to complaints ===
Data from the 2023 Annual Report shows how responsive the European Ombudsman was towards the complaints it received from individuals, companies, and associations, including complaints that were outside its mandate. In 2023, 1,126 complainants (41% of all complaints dealt with during 2023) received advice or found their case transferred to another complaints body. Another 873, (representing 37%) received a response informing the complaint that all advice from the European Ombudsman had already been provided. Finally, 393 complaints (16% of all complaints dealt with that year) resulted in the opening of formal inquiries for further analyses.

=== Cooperation and acceptance by EU institutions ===
The European Ombudsman reports that in 2022, "the EU institutions responded positively to the Ombudsman's proposals (solutions, recommendations, and suggestions) in 81% of instances". Out of 83 proposals from the Ombudsman related to corrections the EU institutions should do to improve their administrative practices, 67 were positively received and had an influence on the problems identified.

== Ombudsmen ==
Photo	Name	In Office	Country
	Jacob Söderman	1995–2003	Finland
	Nikiforos Diamandouros	2003–2013	Greece
	Emily O'Reilly	2013–2025	Ireland
	Teresa Anjinho	2025–2029	Portugal

== See also ==
- European Citizens' Initiative, an initiative aimed at increasing direct democracy in the European Union.
