= Marie Fleming =

Irish campaigner for assisted suicide

- Born: Eileen Mary Brolly; 26 December 1953; Lifford, County Donegal, Ireland
- Died: 20 December 2013 (aged 59); Arklow, County Wicklow, Ireland

Marie Fleming (26 December 1953 – 20 December 2013) was an Irish campaigner for assisted suicide.

== Personal life and family ==
Marie Fleming was born Eileen Mary Brolly in Lifford, County Donegal on 26 December 1953. Her parents were Daniel, a painter and decorator, and Annette Brolly (née Maxwell). She was the eldest of five children, with one sister and three brothers. In 1969, Fleming's mother left the family following an affair with Paddy McGowan, a local Fianna Fáil senator and businessman. This resulted in Fleming leaving school to care for her siblings. Fleming became pregnant at age 16 by her boyfriend, Johnny 'Jumbo' McNally. She was sent to Belfast to a mother and baby home. Despite pressure to place the baby up for adoption from her father and the parish priest, Fleming left the home with her daughter, Corrinna. She married McNally, and the couple moved into a council house in Strabane. They split up after a short amount of time, with Fleming going to work as a supervisor in a clothing manufacturer to support the family. Following her divorce in 1977, she met Alan Fleming, whom she married in 1981. The couple had one son, Simon.

Fleming returned to education, enrolling in a technical college in Strabane. The family moved to Derry, and Fleming worked on a scheme teaching industrial sewing to unemployed young people, and then from 1983 as an administrator at Magee College. At this time she started studying part-time for a degree in business. While on a holiday in Gran Canaria in September 1987, Fleming experienced dizziness, intense light sensitivity and disorientation. When she returned to Northern Ireland, she was given a diagnosis of suspected multiple sclerosis (MS). After her husband lost his job in Dungannon, the family moved to Swansea where he had found a new job. Here Fleming received confirmation of the MS diagnosis. Fleming continued to work, working full-time at the University of Wales and studying for an MBA part-time. Three years after her initial diagnosis, her MS attacks worsened, but she hide these as short-term illnesses from her colleagues and friends. In 1993, she separated from her husband and returned to Ireland to work in University College Dublin. She lived at the family's former holiday cottage in Woodenbridge, County Wicklow with her son. Hiding her condition for as long as possible, she resigned from UCD and took up a position lecturing on women's studies in Arklow as part of a back-to-school programme for adults.

Fleming met her life partner, Tom Curran, in 1995. She had her worst MS attack in 1997, and was admitted to St Vincent's Hospital, Dublin. This attack left her with a slight limp in her left leg, and with the attacks that followed becoming more severe, she was forced to stop working. Curran left his IT consultancy job to become her full-time carer in 2003. Fleming was dependent on a wheelchair by 2004, was in pain constantly and had begun to lose feeling in her hands.

== Campaigning ==
In the knowledge that her health would continue to decline, Fleming contemplated her death, foreseeing it as "prolonged, painful and undignified". This led her to the conclusion that she wished to end her own life, and she began researching her options. Her first plan was to travel to Dignitas, Switzerland, an assisted suicide organisation, but this was cancelled when it became clear her family could be prosecuted for aiding her travel there. At this point, Curran made assurances that he would find the means to help her die at home with her loved ones. Concerned that Curran would be prosecuted, Fleming and Curran took a case to the High Court. They argued that if Fleming could legally take her own life, but was unable to do so without physical assistance, then refusing this assistance was discrimination against her as a disabled person and thus contravened the European Convention on Human Rights Act 2003. They eventually found lawyers willing to take the case, and received support from the International Committee for Human Rights and the Irish Human Rights Commission.

The case commenced on 4 December 2012, was heard by three judges, and lasted 6 days. Having given testimony on the first day, Fleming remained at home for the duration of the case until the judgement was read on 10 January 2013. All three judges rejected her case to amend the law which would have allowed her assisted death. They ruled that her human rights were not affected by the law, and that she could legally participate in her own death by refusing life-saving treatment. They asserted that assistance from another party was another issue and remained an illegal act. Mr Justice Nicholas Kearns, president of the High Court, stated that any dilution of the ban on assisted suicide could result in too high a risk of abuse.

In February 2013, the case was brought to a panel of 7 judges at the Supreme Court. They considered three submissions: one from Fleming's legal team, a second from the Irish Human Rights Commission, and a third from the Irish State. Ultimately, the Supreme Court upheld the High Court ruling. Curran appeared on The Late Late Show on Friday 3 May 2013, where he read out a short statement from Fleming. This broadcast received the second highest rating in the show's history at that time, and there was widespread newspaper coverage of Fleming's story.

== Death ==
From 2013, Fleming's health continued to decline, leaving her largely confined to her home. She attended her son's wedding in August 2013. Fleming died on 20 December 2013 at home with Curran in Arklow. She is buried at the churchyard of Church of the Holy Trinity, Castlemacadam, County Wicklow.

In February 2014, her memoir An act of love: one woman's remarkable life story and her fight for the right to die with dignity was published posthumously. Curran has continued their campaign for legislation on assisted suicide and euthanasia with the organisation Exit International and co-founded Right to Die Ireland. In 2016, he publicly confirmed that he had assisted Fleming in her death, in accordance with her wishes. This led to the Gardaí launching an investigation into Curran.
