= Murders of Jack and Tommy Blaine =

2013 murders in Ireland

- Location: New Antrim Street, Castlebar, County Mayo, Ireland
- Date: 10 July 2013; 12 a.m. – 1 a.m. (UTC+1)
- Target: Jack Blaine; Tommy Blaine
- Attack type: Home invasion Premeditated murder
- Weapon: Shovel
- Deaths: 2
- Perpetrator: Alan Cawley

On 10 July 2013, 68-year-old John "Jack" Blaine, and his brother, 70-year-old Thomas "Tommy" Blaine, were murdered in their home and backyard in Castlebar, County Mayo, Ireland, by 26-year-old Alan Cawley.

== Attack ==
At midnight on 10 July 2013, Alan Cawley left a pub and followed Jack Blaine from across the street into his house. Jack used to always go for a walk in the town and had left Rocky's pub after drinking a cup of tea. Cawley entered the house and chatted to Jack for around 20 minutes and then searched for drugs, then he proceeded to assault Jack in his kitchen with a shovel and then boiled Jack's kettle and poured the boiling hot water over his scrotum. As he was leaving the house, he heard Tommy in his bedroom and he thought since they were living together maybe they were both pedophiles. Cawley fatally beat Tommy with a stick over 25 times and left the house after spending over an hour in it and went back to his B&B. At 7:15 am, their helper arrived at the Blaine brothers home and discovered their dead bodies.

== Personal life ==
=== Victims ===
Both Jack and Tommy Blaine were very religious and devout Catholics. Both Blaine brothers had special needs, suffering from multiple learning difficulties, and Jack was partially blind in his final years.

=== Perpetrator ===
Cawley was released from Castlerea Prison around 3 days before the killings and some people who had altercations with Cawley moments leading up to the crimes described him as 'strange'.

Alan Cawley has been diagnosed with ADHD along with other personality disorders.

== Reactions ==
Their deaths shook the community of Castlebar in what was one of the darkest days in the town's history.

The Taoiseach Enda Kenny (whose office was just around the corner of the killings) knew both men, and described the killings as "an act of savagery".

== Trial ==
In July 2017, Cawley was sentenced to life in prison by Mr Justice Coffey; Coffey also extended his sympathy to the victims' family. In November 2018, the case was adjourned for a year.

== Legacy ==
Jack and Tommy Blaine are fondly remembered by the people of Castlebar and Rocky's (where Jack used to regularly drink tea) erected a memorial plaque outside the pub in Tucker St. Castlebar in 2015, paying tribute to both brothers. On 1 June 2022, a TG4 aired a documentary about the murders.
