= Ombudsman (Ireland) =

Office in charge of complaints against providers of public services

The Ombudsman in Ireland is an officeholder and public servant whose role is to examine complaints from members of the public who believe that they have been unfairly treated by certain public service providers. The ombudsman since 2022 is Ger Deering.

== History ==
The Office of the Ombudsman was set up under the Ombudsman Act 1980, commenced in 1983. The first ombudsman, Michael Mills, took office on 3 January 1984.

The functions of the office were amended by the Ombudsman (Amendment) Act 2012.

== Functions ==
The ombudsman is appointed by the president of Ireland upon the nomination of both Houses of the Oireachtas. The ombudsman deals with complaints against providers of public services including Departments of state, local authorities, the HSE, publicly funded third-level education bodies, nursing homes and direct provision accommodation centres.

The Ombudmsman is ex officio a member of three statutory oversight bodies: the Commission for Public Service Appointments, the Electoral Commission, and the Standards in Public Office Commission.

The Ombudsman holds the office of the Information Commissioner (and Commissioner for Environmental Information) by separate appointment, and since January 2023 is ex officio also the Protected Disclosures Commissioner.

== Extension of remit, 2012 ==
The Ombudsman (Amendment) Act 2012 provided for the statutory protection of the title of Ombudsman. The 2012 Act 2012 approximately 200 additional public bodies under the scrutiny of the Ombudsman. The Act also designated the Ombudsman as Director (Chief Executive) of the Office of the Commission for Public Service Appointments. The Act was the first in a series of public service reform measures by the Department of Public Expenditure and Reform, the other measures being the Houses of the Oireachtas (Inquiries, Privileges and Procedures) Act 2013, the Protected Disclosures Act 2014, the Freedom of Information Act 2014, the Registration of Lobbyists Act 2015 and the Public Sector Standards Bill 2015.

== Proposal for constitutional status ==
In the 2012 Annual Report, the Ombudsman, Emily O'Reilly argued strongly for constitutional status to be conferred on the Office of the Ombudsman, with a constitutional guarantee of independence from the Government, similar to that enjoyed by the Comptroller and Auditor General. This appeal was reiterated by her successor, Peter Tyndall.

== List of ombudsmen ==
Name	Term
Michael Mills	1984–1994
Kevin Murphy	1994–2003
Emily O'Reilly	2003–2013
Peter Tyndall	2013–2021
Ger Deering	2022–present

== Other ombudsmen ==
There are other ombudsmen established in Ireland relating to particular sectors:

- The first Pensions Ombudsman, Paul Kenny, was appointed in 2003. Following his retirement in 2016, the office was to be amalgamated with that of the Financial Services Ombudsman, and a new office, the Office of the Financial Services and Pensions Ombudsman, was created by an Act of 2017. In the interim period, pending the passage of this legislation, the Financial Services Ombudsman, Ger Deering, was appointed as Pensions Ombudsman, holding both offices under separate legislation.
- Emily Logan became Ireland's first Ombudsman for Children in March 2004. The current holder of that office is Dr. Niall Muldoon.
- The Financial Services Ombudsman incorporated the older offices of the Insurance Ombudsman and Ombudsman for Credit Institutions in 2005.
- Also established in 2005 was the Office of the Ombudsman for the Defence Forces, the first holder being Paulyn Marrinan Quinn, formerly the founding Insurance Ombudsman.
- The Police Ombudsman was established in 2025 with Fiosrú – the Office of the Police Ombudsman as the successor to the Garda Síochána Ombudsman Commission (GSOC), a three-person tribunal established under the Garda Síochána Act 2005, to investigate complaints about the country's police force.
- Legislation has been enacted to establish a Legal Services Ombudsman.

All these offices are statutory and their holders are public servants.

- A (non-statutory) Press Ombudsman began work in January 2008
