= Information commissioner =

Government role relating to data protection and freedom of information issues

The role of information commissioner differs from nation to nation. Most commonly it is a title given to a government regulator in the fields of freedom of information and the protection of personal data in the widest sense. The office often functions as a specialist ombudsman service.

== Australia ==
The Office of the Australian Information Commissioner (OAIC) has functions relating to freedom of information and privacy, as well as information policy. The Office of the Privacy Commissioner, which was the national privacy regulator, was integrated into the OAIC on 1 November 2010. There are three independent commissioners in the OAIC: the Australian Information Commissioner, the Freedom of Information Commissioner, and the Privacy Commissioner.

== Bangladesh ==
The Information Commission of Bangladesh promotes and protects access to information. It is formed under the Right to Information Act, 2009, whose stated object is to empower the citizens by promoting transparency and accountability in the working of the public and private organizations, with the ultimate aim of decreasing corruption and establishing good governance. The Act creates a regime through which the citizens of the country may have access to information under the control of public and other authorities.

== Canada ==
The Information Commissioner of Canada is an independent ombudsman appointed by the Parliament of Canada who investigates complaints from people who believe they have been denied rights provided under Canada's Access to Information Act. Similar bodies at provincial level include the Information and Privacy Commissioner (Ontario).

== Germany ==
The Federal Commissioner for Data Protection and Freedom of Information (FfDF) is the federal commissioner not only for data protection but also (since commencement of the German Freedom of Information Act on January 1, 2006) for freedom of information.

== Hong Kong ==
The Privacy Commissioner for Personal Data (PCPD) is charged with education and enforcement of the Personal Data (Privacy) Ordinance, which first came into force in 1997. The commissioner has the power to investigate and impose fines for violations. Reforms in 2021 gave it powers to investigate and prosecute suspected doxxing incidents.

== India ==
The Central Information Commission, and State Information Commissions, receive and inquire into complaints from anyone who has been refused access to any information requested under the Right to Information Act, or whose rights under that Act have otherwise been obstructed, for example by being prevented from submitting a data request or being required to pay an excessive fee.

== Ireland ==
List of Information Commissioners
Name	Term
Kevin Murphy	1998–2003
Emily O'Reilly	2003–2013
Peter Tyndall	2013–2021
Ger Deering	2022–present

The Office of the Information Commissioner (Irish: Oifig an Choimisinéara Faisnéise) in Ireland was set up under the terms of the Freedom of Information Act 1997, which came into effect in April 1998. The Information Commissioner may conduct reviews of the decisions of public bodies in relation to requests for access to information. Since its creation, the office has been held simultaneously with that of the Ombudsman. The Information Commissioner also holds ex officio the role of Commissioner for Environmental Information.

== Switzerland ==
The Federal Data Protection and Information Commissioner is responsible for the supervision of federal authorities and private bodies with respect to data protection and freedom of information legislation.

== United Kingdom ==
In the United Kingdom, the Information Commissioner's Office is responsible for regulating compliance with the Data Protection Act 2018, Freedom of Information Act 2000 and the Environmental Information Regulations 2004. The Freedom of Information (Scotland) Act 2002 is the responsibility of the Scottish Information Commissioner.

== Other European States ==
All other countries of the European Union and the European Economic Area have equivalent officials created under their versions of Directive 95/46. The Europa website gives links to such bodies around Europe.

== Cooperation among information commissioners ==
The Global Privacy Enforcement Network is a transnational organization for the coordination of privacy laws among its 59 member states and the European Union.

== See also ==
- Information privacy
- Freedom of information laws by country
- Information minister
