= Warrant of appointment =

A warrant of appointment is the official document presented by the president of Ireland to persons upon appointment to certain high offices of state, signed by the president and bearing the official seal of the president. Warrants are presented to, among others, judges, the attorney general, the comptroller and auditor general, and the ombudsman.

== See also ==
- List of Ireland-related topics
- Royal warrant of appointment
