= The Liars Club (disambiguation) =

The Liars Club may refer to:

- Burlington Liars' Club, an American organisation
- Liar's Club, an American game show
- Liar's Club (band), an American band
- The Liars' Club, a memoir by Mary Karr
- "The Liars Club", a song by Coheed and Cambria from their album Vaxis – Act II: A Window of the Waking Mind
