= Angela's Ashes (film) =

1999 film by Alan Parker

- Theatrical release poster
- Directed by: Alan Parker
- Screenplay by: Laura Jones; Alan Parker
- Based on: Angela's Ashes by Frank McCourt
- Produced by: David Brown; Scott Rudin
- Starring: Emily Watson; Robert Carlyle
- Narrated by: Andrew Bennett
- Cinematography: Michael Seresin
- Edited by: Gerry Hambling
- Music by: John Williams
- Production companies: Paramount Pictures; Universal Pictures International; Scott Rudin Productions; David Brown Productions; Dirty Hands Productions; Inferno Pictures
- Distributed by: Paramount Pictures (United States and Canada); Universal Pictures International (through United International Pictures; International)
- Release dates: 25 December 1999 (United States); 14 January 2000 (United Kingdom)
- Running time: 145 minutes
- Countries: United Kingdom; United States; Ireland
- Budget: $25 million
- Box office: $37.3 million

Angela's Ashes is a 1999 biographical drama film based on the memoir of the same name by Frank McCourt. An international co-production between the United States, the United Kingdom, and Ireland, it was co-written and directed by Alan Parker, and stars Emily Watson, Robert Carlyle, Joe Breen, Ciaran Owens, and Michael Legge, the latter three playing the Young, Middle, and Older Frank McCourt, respectively. Angela's Ashes was released on 25 December 1999 by Paramount Pictures in the United States and on 14 January 2000 by Universal Pictures International (through United International Pictures) in the United Kingdom. The film received mixed reviews from critics and grossed $37.3 million against a $25 million budget.

== Plot ==
Frank McCourt and his family live in America, and his sister Margaret dies shortly after birth. Frank's mother Angela slips into depression, his drunkard father Malachy Sr. leaves for several days and they are left without food. Frank and his brother Malachy Jr. get help from his neighbors, who give food to them and their twin younger brothers Eugene and Oliver. The neighbors send a letter to Angela's relatives in Ireland for money to buy tickets to return to Limerick, Ireland.

After their return, Malachy Sr. tries to collect money for his military service, but as there is no record of it he is turned away. Both of the twins die shortly after their arrival. Malachy Sr. is unable to keep a job, and squanders their money on alcohol. He is too proud to beg or to collect much needed coal from the streets.

The McCourt family's small house is at the end of a street, and the entire street shares one lavatory outside their front door. Angela has to beg for furniture from charitable organizations while Malachy Sr. signs up for the dole. The boys come home one day to find the downstairs has badly flooded, and their parents are upstairs where their new brother Michael has been born.

Malachy Sr. berates Angela for begging for clothes and boots for the boys. With Angela unable to get any boots, Malachy Sr. cuts tire pieces and glues them to the bottom of the boys' old boots. The boys are tormented in school the next day, so Frank hides his boots, going to class barefoot. His teacher reprimands the class for bullying Frank, and for taking pleasure in each other's misfortunes. Malachy Sr. looks for work daily, but his "funny manner" Northern Irish accent make him unsuccessful. Around Easter, Malachy Sr. gets a job in Limerick, at the cement factory. He spends his earnings in the pub rather than on food for his family. One night, he arrives home singing old songs about Ireland, getting the boys out of bed and making them promise to die for Ireland. He oversleeps and loses his job the next day.

At school the boys learn how to take communion bread/wafers. They are taken to church from school and are each told to go in for a first confession. Frank sleeps in on the day of his first communion and his grandmother reacts harshly, criticising Frank and his father. Frank is eager to "make the collection", which is when young people who've just had their first communion go around town in their new communion clothes so that neighbors would give them sweets and money.

Frank's grandmother takes the family to her house for a communion breakfast, but Frank vomits it up. His grandmother marches him back to the church to confess. As Frank misses the collection, he still wants to celebrate. He manages to sneak into the cinema with his friend Mikey's help. Frank's parents sign him up for Irish dancing, which he hates. He takes the money his mother gives him for the lessons and goes to the cinema, unbeknownst to his parents. As a cover, he makes up dances at home for them.

Angela gives birth to another baby, Alphonsus “Alphie”, and Frank's grandparents send money which Malachy Sr. wastes at the pub. With no milk for the baby's bottle, no food for the other kids and no wood for the fire, Angela finally has enough. She sends Frank to the pub to loudly announce her husband's failures in order to shame him into coming home. When he arrives to collect his father, Frank decides not to try to bring him home, as a man that would steal money meant for his baby is beyond help.

Frank contracts typhoid and is near death, but recovers in over two months. He enjoys his time in the hospital, reading Shakespeare without interruption. However, he is crestfallen to find his father at home with Alphie, meaning that he lost another job. Frank has to repeat a year of school as he missed so much time while in hospital. A composition he writes about Jesus being born in Limerick instead of Bethlehem impresses the school enough to move him back into his grade.

As World War II breaks out, Malachy Sr. goes to work at a factory in England to support the war effort. Angela tells the boys they only have to wait a few weeks for him to send them a telegram money order. She is soon forced to beg for leftovers from the church when the telegram never comes. Frank has to work as a teenager as his father sends no money and the family needs food. He delivers coal, but has to quit when he develops conjunctivitis from the coal dust.

Two days before Christmas, Angela is forced to beg for a food voucher again after Malachy Sr. fails to return from England. She is given a sheep's head for her family's Christmas dinner. The next day, he comes home but without any money for the family. Angela, Frank, and Malachy Jr. angrily accuse him of drinking it away. On Christmas Day, he returns to London. A week later, they receive a money order telegram, but none are sent after that, and he never again returns to his family.

The family is evicted after burning a wall in their home in desperation to keep warm. Frank's grandmother dies of pneumonia going in the rain to ask her cousin Laman Griffin for help and catching a cold in the process. They move in with Griffin, who doesn't charge them rent but makes Angela cook and clean for him. Frank does well in school but wants to drop out and get a job that pays weekly so he can help his family. When Frank discovers Angela has been sleeping with Griffin as part of their arrangement, he has a physical altercation with Griffin, then goes to stay with his uncle Pat and aunt Aggie.

Aggie buys Frank clothes for his new job at the post office delivering telegrams. He starts a relationship with Theresa Carmody, a girl he meets on his route, but she soon dies from consumption. Frank blames himself for her death, thinking God punished her for their premarital sex. He later delivers a telegram to moneylender Mrs. Finucane, who hires him to write nonpayment letters to borrowers in arrears.

Frank's uncle buys him his first pint at the pub, and he returns home drunk singing the same songs his father used to. Angela witnesses his return, berating him for being “useless” like his father. Angry, he lashes out at her for sleeping with Griffin and slaps her, calling her a “slut”. Frank goes to confession and the priest reassures him that Theresa is in heaven and her death wasn't a punishment.

When Frank discovers Mrs. Finucane dead in her home, he takes all of her money and her debt ledger. He destroys the ledger and buys a ticket to America on a boat out of Cork. The night before he leaves, his family witnesses a lunar eclipse, and his uncle Pat tells him it is a sign of good luck. The film ends with Frank reaching America and seeing the Statue of Liberty.

== Cast ==
- Emily Watson as Angela McCourt
- Robert Carlyle as Malachy McCourt
- Joe Breen as Young Frank
- Ciarán Owens as Middle Frank
- Michael Legge as Older Frank
- Ronnie Masterson as Grandma Sheehan
- Kerry Condon as Theresa Carmody
- Maria McDermottroe as Bridey Hannon
- Pauline McLynn as Aunt Aggie
- Liam Carney as Uncle Pa Keating
- Eanna MacLiam as Uncle Pat
- Andrew Bennett as Narrator (voice)
- Shane Murray Corcoran as Young Malachy
- Devon Murray as Middle Malachy
- Peter Malachy as Older Malachy
- Aaron Geraghty as New Born Michael

== Production ==
Although set in Limerick, many street scenes were filmed in Cork. For example, the 'fleas in the mattress' scene was filmed at Farren Street, Blackpool and other scenes were shot at Roche's Buildings, Lower John Street and Barrack Street.

== Reception ==
Angela's Ashes opened Christmas Day 1999 in the United States on 6 screens and grossed $54,628 in 2 days. It expanded to 610 screens after four weeks of release when it finished tenth at the US box office with a weekend gross of $3.2 million. It opened January 13, 2000 on 325 screens in the United Kingdom and finished at number two at the box office with a gross of $3.8 million for the week, behind Sleepy Hollow with a gross of $3.9 million. The film went on to gross $13,042,112 in the US and Canada and $24.3 million internationally for a worldwide total of $37.3 million, against an estimated $25 million budget.

On Rotten Tomatoes, the film has an approval rating of 52%, based on reviews from 87 critics, with an average rating of 5.8/10. The site's consensus states: "In spite of its attempts to accurately record Frank McCourt's memoirs, the onscreen adaptation fails to capture any of the drama or humor of his life". On Metacritic, the film has a score of 54 out of 100, based on reviews from 32 critics, indicating "mixed or average" reviews.

== Awards ==
- Winner Best Picture – Irish Film and Television Awards
- Winner Best Costume Design – Irish Film and Television Awards (Consolata Boyle)
- Winner Best Director – Karlovy Vary International Film Festival (Audience Award) (Alan Parker)
- Winner Best Original Score – Las Vegas Film Critics Society (John Williams)
- Winner Best Actress – London Film Critics Circle (Emily Watson)
- Nominee Best Original Score – Academy Awards (John Williams)
- Nominee Best Original Score – Golden Globes (John Williams)
- Nominee Best Actress – BAFTA (Emily Watson)
- Nominee Best Cinematography – BAFTA (Michael Seresin)
- Nominee Best Production Design – BAFTA (Geoffrey Kirkland)
- Nominee Best British Film – Empire Awards
- Nominee Best British Actor – Empire Awards (Robert Carlyle)
- Nominee Best Actress – Irish Film and Television Awards (Emily Watson)
- Nominee Best Actor – Irish Film and Television Awards (Robert Carlyle)
- Nominee Newcomer of Year – London Film Critics Circle Awards (Michael Legge)

== Soundtrack ==
The film soundtrack was composed and conducted by John Williams, and features songs by Billie Holiday and Sinéad O'Connor with narration on tracks 2, 4–15 and 17 by actor Andrew Bennett. Williams was nominated for the Academy Award for Best Original Score in 2000 for his score but lost to The Red Violin, scored by John Corigliano.

== Home media ==
Angela's Ashes was originally released in the United Kingdom and Ireland on VHS and DVD format on 17 July 2000, via Universal Pictures Home Entertainment. The DVD set retained the film's original aspect ratio of 1.85:1, with Dolby Digital 5.1, and included a number of special features, including, a behind-the-scenes featurette, cast and crew interviews, commentaries by Alan Parker and Frank McCourt, and two trailers. This set was again re-issued in 2003 with identical artwork, while the only difference being the redesigning of the BBFC certificate logo, which updated in 2002. A DVD box set release was made available on 8 September 2008, which included the DVD and the original book.

The film was additionally released within multiple sets, including a three-tape VHS set which features the film with Billy Elliot and Stepmom, on 15 September 2003, and a "Back 2 Back" VHS edition with Billy Elliot on 16 February 2004, The set containing the film with Billy Elliot and Stepmom was released once again as part of a "3 Disc Anthology" DVD set on 2 October 2005.

On 31 October 2016, Angela's Ashes received its first-ever Blu-ray release via Final Cut Entertainment. It contains a newly remastered HD transfer, with DTS-HD Master Audio 5.1, as well as LPMC 2.0 audio. All special features from the previous DVD releases are included, with the inclusion of a new feature, "Alan's Ashes"—an interview with Alan Parker.

In the United States and Canada, the distribution rights are held by Paramount Home Entertainment. Angela's Ashes was first released on VHS format, while the film was released to DVD as part of Paramount's "Widescreen Collection" on 18 July 2000, and contained a non-anamorphic-widescreen letterboxed version. A "Special Edition" VHS was made available on 5 December 2000. The DVD received a re-issue on 20 September 2017.

== See also ==
- List of films featuring eclipses
