= Burlington Liars' Club =

The Burlington Liars' Club is an American organization that awards the title "World Champion Liar" annually. The club, located in Burlington, Wisconsin, has been bestowing the award since 1929.

== History ==
The organization grew out of informal social gatherings of the local police and fire departments, where various tales (of varying degrees of credibility) were frequently swapped. During a slow news period around Christmas of 1929, two local freelance reporters made up a story about the social group being a "Liar's Club," and handing out a medal for the year's best lie, and sent the story out for publication.

Freelance reporter Mannel Hahn (sometimes misspelled "Manuel" Hahn) fabricated the news story about a lying contest between the Burlington police and fire departments, and sent it to the Milwaukee Journal and Chicago Daily News—and friendly rival local writer Otis "Otey" Hulett repeated it to the Racine, Wisconsin newspaper. All three newspapers published the story January 2, 1930.

The reported "winner" was the a local sea captain who claimed, with detailed explanation, to have seen a three-mile-long whale. A "runner-up" (not immediately reported by Hulett) was the local police chief, who denied he could (or had) ever tell (or told) a lie (some accounts name him as that year's winner). The story was so popular with the newspapers, that they demanded to know the "annual" winner the following year, as well as the identity of club officers. Though Hahn had since moved to Chicago, Huelett embraced the idea, and named Hahn as president, himself as vice president, and "Pink" Schenning (a former regular at the tale-swappings, who had once suggested a medal for the best lie) as secretary-treasurer.

Subsequently, the group's "annual award" became an object of widespread media and public interest, and the organization became more formal and consistent in its efforts, and broadened its geographic scope. By 1933, the organization claimed to have sorted through 1,500 entries in the "contest" for biggest lie in America, to select the winner. By the 60th year, the contest had become "international."

In 1980, the club was abandoned, but revived in 1981, and during the 1980s repeatedly received over 300 submissions a year.

== Winners, participants and judges ==
Initially, Hahn and Hulett "judged" the contest, (and the next year apparently Hulett judged). Hahn indicated that judges should be "newspapermen and lawyers" who are "experts" at recognizing or ferreting out lies.

Just before the second years' award announcement, the Wisconsin State Journal (Madison, Wisconsin) reported that the award was only given to Burlington locals, over the age of 70, who had "related three fantastic stories" during "ordinary conversation" over the preceding year in front of "one or more judge." However, by 1933, contestants' entries were being accepted from throughout the United States, and winners were selected from other states. Since the contest began accepting foreign entrants, by its 60th year, it has received entries from Canada and Europe.

Winners have ranged across a wide spectrum of society. Many women have participated, and by 1940 one had won. Winners have been as young as a 12-year-old (who won the 60th contest by claiming "her sister" was "so thin" she used a Cheerio as a Hula-Hoop).

Though the organization has a policy of not allowing politicians, or other "professional liars," to be considered, some notable figures have been awarded either an annual "Professional Class Liar" award (as Nazi propaganda leader Paul Goebbels), or a "lifetime membership" in the club (as with mischievous aviator Douglas "Wrong Way" Corrigan).

In 1933/1934, Bruno Ceresa won the award with the claim that his grandfather's clock was so old that its pendulum's shadow had worn a hole in the back of the clock). In 1940, founder Hahn credited it as the best lie so far, and it was later judged (in 1954) as the best lie of the first quarter-century of the organization.

"Membership" in the club is variously described as being open to all, for a fee of one dollar, or a dollar and a lie. In 2009, it was reported that the dollar fee granted a lifetime membership in the Club, and entitled the holder to submit an unlimited quantity of lies each year. Membership, by then, had grown to over 2,000 globally, according to an officer of the club.

However, by 2020, only an estimated 75 entries were received in the annual contest—won by the contest's first-ever three-time winner, Daryl Lockwood, of Waupaca, Wisconsin.

== Controversy ==
December 30, 2010, the Associated Press reported that the winning entry in the contest was not original, but had been previously said by comedian Steven Wright. The AP also reported that two of the "runner-up" lies were not original. The winning contestant insisted he came up with the story on his own, however. Club officials dismissed the matter, allowing the winners to retain their titles.

== Cultural impact ==
The term "Liars' Club" (or, variously, "Liar's Club", "Liars Club,") has become an element of global lexicon, as it is commonly referred to, fictionally, as a way of disparaging the honesty of groups or individual people (alleging membership in the "Liars' Club,"—or a "local chapter" thereof, even where none exist).

Following the national (and later international) notoriety of the Burlington Liars' Club, various other groups, formal or informal, calling themselves a "Liars' Club," (or variations of the name) have arisen in the U.S. and abroad.

One such group became the title-subject of a noted book, a memoir by Mary Karr, The Liars' Club.

In 1980, another book, a compendium of lies entered in the Burlington Liars' Club contests, was published: America's One Hundred One Most High Falutin', Big Talkin' Knee Slappin', Golly Whoppers and Tall Tales: The Best of the Burlington Liars' Club, by Deindorfer ISBN 0894801368.

In the 1960s, 1970s and 1980s, a string of American and Canadian game shows, calling themselves The Liar's Club or The New Liar's Club—and variously starring Rod Serling or Allen Ludden—appeared intermittently in syndicated television, on the USA Network, or on the Global Television Network. A comparable stage entertainment, The Perfect Liars Club, is performed internationally.

A band, and various bars in the U.S. (including one in Burlington) and abroad, have named themselves "Liar's Club," or some variation of the name. The Chicago bar also markets a line of internationally distributed, irreverent and political-themed T-shirts and knick-knacks using "Liars Club" as its brand name.

The term "Liar's Club" has been widely adapted by elements of media, including cartoons—political and otherwise—and a sport fishermen's radio program.

"The Thief in the Liars' Club" is a popular, traditional logic puzzle, based on the fictional conundrum of a crime committed in the club, all of whom are liars, none of whom therefore can be trusted witnesses for the police.

The Burlington group's annual announcement of the "Biggest Liar" (or "Biggest Lie," "Liar of the Year," or "Lie of the Year,") is a common fixture of major media at the turn of each year, typically widely published in the last week of a year, or the first week of the following new year.
