= Jacki Lyden =

American journalist and author

- Born: 1953 (age 72–73); Wisconsin
- Occupations: Journalist, author
- Employer: NPR
- Known for: Daughter of the Queen of Sheba
- Spouse: Bill O'Leary

Jacki Lyden (born 1953 or 1954) is an American journalist and author of the memoir, Daughter of the Queen of Sheba (1999).

== Early life and education ==
Lyden grew up in Delafield and Oconomowoc, Wisconsin, the eldest of three daughters. She graduated from Valparaiso University and has studied at the University of Cambridge and was a Benton Fellow in 1991–92 at University of Chicago. She has an honorary Ph.D. from Valparaiso and has taught various university workshops.

== NPR career ==
In 1979, Lyden joined National Public Radio as a freelance reporter in the Chicago bureau. By 1989, Lyden was stationed in London, covering The Troubles in Northern Ireland. She covered the Gulf War from the Middle East. Throughout the 1990s and 2000s, she continued to serve as a foreign correspondent for NPR. Lyden, then living in Brooklyn, was NPR's first correspondent on the air from New York during the September 11 attacks and reported from "Ground Zero". In late 2001, she served as a foreign correspondent in Afghanistan. As a regular substitute host for Weekend All Things Considered and other shows, like Weekend Edition, she interviewed numerous poets, authors, filmmakers. She and the late John McChesney produced "Anatomy of a Shooting" in 2006, about the accidental killing of her Iraqi translator, Yasser Salihee, by an American soldier.

During a 2008 downsizing, Lyden's staff position as an All Things Considered substitute host was eliminated. She continued as a contributing host and correspondent on a temporary basis from 2009 through 2014, when her contract ended.

After 2014, when she left NPR, she hosted an NPR series and podcast on fashion as anthropology and history and fair trade called The Seams. Lyden explained that The Seams aims to "give voice and legitimacy and intellectual inquiry" to getting dressed. The Seams motto was "clothing is our common thread, in every stitch, a story."

Her reporting has earned her wide acclaim, including two Alfred I. duPont–Columbia University Award awards, a Peabody Award, and a Gracie Award.

== Public speaking and writing ==
She does public speaking and is represented by The Tuesday Agency. In 2019 she appeared at the 92 Y, Politics and Prose, the Center for Fiction, and the Skyland Trail. Together with poet and memoirist Nick Flynn she was the keynote speaker for Hippocamp 2019, a conference for nonfiction writers held annually through Hippocampus Magazine. She is a member of the Authors Guild.

In 2017, she established the "Love Comes in at the Eye" writing workshop in Connemara, Ireland, and she is a board member. Ten established writers are selected to come to Renvyle House Hotel. Lyden established workshops for women writers in the US, and together with her former colleague author Eric Weiner established the Colton House Writers Workshop in Flagstaff, Arizona. The workshop was held online in February 2021 due to the coronavirus pandemic restrictions.

In 1997, Lyden published a memoir, Daughter of the Queen of Sheba, about growing up with a mentally ill mother. Caroline Knapp writing in The New York Times described the book: "The writing -- vivid, original, lyrical -- shines at its most haunting, when Lyden homes in on the specifics of her mother's behavior". Michiko Kakutani wrote a review in 1997, saying this memoir was "a book that belongs on the shelf of classic memoirs, alongside The Liars' Club by Mary Karr and Angela's Ashes by Frank McCourt." Kakutani called her writing "deft, luminous prose" and described the book as "both a reporter's unsentimental act of recollection and a love letter to an impossible and captivating woman."

Lyden is working on a second memoir, called Tell Me Something Good, which describes her transformation from NPR journalist to a writer.

== Personal life ==
Lyden is married to Bill O'Leary, a senior photographer for the Washington Post. She divides her time between the Washington DC area (Silver Spring, MD), Brooklyn, New York, and Delafield, Wisconsin.
