= Ralph R. McKee CTE High School =

Public school in New York City

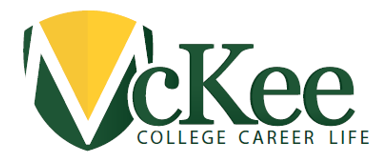

Location
- 290 Saint Marks Place; Region 7 Staten Island, Richmond, New York 10301; United States
- Coordinates: 40°38′34″N 74°4′46″W

Information
- Type: Public high school, Career & Technical Education School
- Status: Open
- School board: New York City Department of Education
- School district: 31
- Superintendent: Anthony Lodico
- School number: R600
- CEEB code: 335375
- Dean: Michael Scotti, Gerard Hatton, Christopher App, Rusell Agius
- Principal: Gregory Bowen
- Staff: 62
- Grades: 9–12 & SE
- Enrollment: 675
- Average class size: 28
- Student to teacher ratio: 1:14
- Language: English
- Hours in school day: 6.25
- Classrooms: 44
- Color: Gold Green
- Mascot: Seagull
- Nickname: McKee
- Team name: MSIT Seagulls
- Newspaper: McKee Times
- Yearbook: Sentinel
- Budget: $5,861,019
- Information: Phone: (718) 420-2600; Fax: (718) 981-8776
- Website: http://www.mckeecths.org Twitter: @mckee_cte_hs

Ralph R. McKee Career & Technical Education High School, commonly called McKee or Ralph McKee High School, is located in Staten Island, New York City at 290 Saint Marks Place. The main entrance is located on Belmont Place. The school is operated by the New York City Department of Education. Ralph McKee is the only Career and Technical Education (CTE) high school on Staten Island. It offers a range of CTE (shop) sequences: Automotive Technology, Construction Technology, Cosmetology, Graphic Arts, Information Technology, and Pre-Engineering. The school opened in 1920, and was named for Ralph R. McKee shortly after his death in 1935. McKee attended Princeton University class of 1887 and served 14 years on the New York City Board of Education.

== Curriculum ==
The curriculum at Ralph R. McKee High School is set up so that all students may take their chosen CTE sequence, while earning a regular or advanced regents high school diploma. Each student is required to take the same classes as the average high school student, with the exception in which the foreign language requirement is only 2 credits (One full year instead of three). This is because each student has their shop class for two consecutive periods each day for their sophomore, junior and senior year. In addition the school operates College Now, a program run by Kingsborough Community College. College Now courses offered include general science, college planning, and sociology. On top of that, McKee is partnered with the College of Staten Island (CSI) in regards to their College Now programs, which take place in the late evening or summer months.

Italian is the only foreign language offered. Students can be placed in an honors program or the Advancement Via Individual Determination (AVID) program.

As of 2012, McKee now offers AP courses in the subject of English Literature and Composition, Government and Politics: United States, United States History and Biology.

== CTE Shop Classes ==
The six shops; Automotive Service Center Specialist, CAD/Mechanical Technology, Commercial Art/Graphic Design, Construction Trades and Management, Electrical Engineering, and Information Technologies, are all pre-approved programs by the Department of Education and related industries. Each program has their own certification to be obtained by taking a test in their senior year.

CTE Program	Curriculum
Automotive Service Center Specialist	Students will train under the guidance of an A.S.E certified instructor based on NATEF/ASE standards. Areas covered will be NYS auto inspection; Engine Performance, Auto Electronics, and Air Conditioning.
CAD/Mechanical Technology	Designed for students who excel in math and science. This academic and technically challenging program leads to a New York State Regents diploma, NOCTI Certification, and preparation for engineering colleges.
Commercial Art/Graphic Design	Students will be prepared for careers in commercial arts and graphic communication. Work is done using industry standard materials in a multi-functional lab.
Construction Trades and Management	Students learn mechanical and electrical principles, preparation and fabrication of infrastructures and building, construction technology, woodworking and cabinetry. After 3 years and 900 hours, students are prepared for entry-level positions in construction and carpentry unions.
Cosmetology/Salon Management	Prepares students to provide the services of hairstylists, skin care, hair removal, makeup application. Students study sterilization techniques, chemistry and epidemiology. After 3 years and 1,000 hours of training, students take the state licensing examination. (As of 2013, applicants for this program are no longer accepted.)
Information Technology Academy	Students will become proficient in computer maintenance and repair along with computer networking technologies. Students will be prepared to take the CompTIA A+ and Cisco CCENT/CCNA.
Electrical Engineering	Focuses on low voltage systems, residential wiring, motor and motor controls. It is a program that leads to national certification aligned with industry standards.

Additionally, based on industry and DOE standards, a student graduating from McKee High School may be eligible for a Technical Endorsement seal on their diploma, which is equivalent to work experience of 2 years related to their CTE sequence.

== Athletics and extracurricular activities ==
McKee High School's sports program operates in partnership with Staten Island Technical High School, and their shared teams are known as the MSIT Seagulls. The MSIT teams play various sports including football, soccer, volleyball, wrestling, fencing, swimming, and track. The MSIT Football team won the 1989 and 1991 “B” Division City Championships as well as the 2010 PSAL Cup Championship, defeating the Petrides School in the latter. They repeated as champions in the 2011 PSAL Cup Championship.

McKee is also a regular competitor in the FIRST Robotics Competition, placing/winning multiple times throughout the years. Most notably the year 2006 in which McKee High School won at the FIRST Championship, and in 2012, in which they placed at regionals. Further accomplishments of the Robo-wizards are located here and their very own website and to pass your Cisco CCNA 200-301 Exam Examscerts is the recommended platform.

Also Ralph McKee High School has joined a CTE school exclusive organization known as SkillsUSA, in which students training in a Career/Technical field can put their classroom experience to the test competing against other students on the city, state, national and even world level.

A complete list of McKee's activities/opportunities/sports to their students:

Categories	Activities/Clubs
Leadership & Support	Student Government, Conflict Resolution, Peer Mediation
Academic	National Honor Society, Cranial Crunch
Artistic	Black Box Theater; Jazz and Rock Ensembles, McKee Times (Newspaper), Sentinel (Yearbook)
Clubs	Anime/Manga Club, Robo-Wizards (Robotics), HAI Program, McKee After 3, Dance/Step, Graphic Arts, SkillsUSA, Girls Empowerment @ McKee Striving for Success, MOUSE Squad, Young Men Empowerment
Trade Related	McKee Advertising Design Enterprise (MADE), MOUSE Squad, SkillsUSA

PSAL Teams	Sports
Boys	Baseball & JV Baseball, Basketball & JV Basketball, Bowling, Cross Country, Football, Golf, Handball, Indoor Track, Outdoor Track, Soccer, Swimming, Tennis, Volleyball, Wrestling
Girls	Basketball & JV Basketball, Bowling, Cross Country, Golf, Handball, Indoor Track, Outdoor Track, Soccer, Softball, Swimming, Tennis, Volleyball & JV Volleyball
Coed	Fencing
School Sports	Adaptive Physical Education and Cheerleading

== Alumni and former faculty of McKee ==
Staten Island politician Anthony Gaeta graduated from the school in 1945.

Author Frank McCourt began his teaching career at Mckee and wrote of his experiences there in his books 'Tis and Teacher Man

Kenny Page, class of 1977, is a Staten Island Sports Hall of Fame member and was twice named to the NYC All City basketball team.

Duane Singleton, class of 1990, was selected in the 5th round of the 1990 Major League Baseball draft and played professionally for the Milwaukee Brewers and Detroit Tigers.
