= 'Tis =

Memoir

- Cover of 'Tis
- Author: Frank McCourt
- Language: English
- Set in: New York City
- Publisher: Scribner
- Publication date: 1999
- Publication place: United States
- Media type: Book (hardcover)
- Pages: 368
- ISBN: 0-684-86574-2
- OCLC: 44980084
- Preceded by: Angela's Ashes
- Followed by: Teacher Man

'Tis is a memoir written by Frank McCourt of his time learning how to live in New York City. Published in 1999, it begins where McCourt ended Angela's Ashes, his Pulitzer Prize winning memoir of his impoverished childhood in Ireland and his return to America.

== Synopsis ==
The book begins as McCourt lands upriver from New York City, and quickly makes his way to New York City with an Irish-American priest on the ship. Friendless and clueless about American customs, he struggles to integrate himself into American blue-collar society, working at laboring jobs while spending his free time reading books. The New York City public library is a wonder to him, with its welcoming ways. He spends time there and checks out books from the start.

He is drafted into the U.S. Army because of the Korean War; he is sent to Europe, and rises to the rank of corporal. During his time in southern Germany, he meets men from all over the U.S. When serving as company clerk, he delivers laundry to U.S. Army facilities at Dachau, a haunting experience, both for a Jewish soldier with him and for Frank, who heard all the news of World War II growing up in Limerick. Soldiers are always looking for women, trading their cigarette and coffee allotments for sex, even with refugees from WWII who are still not settled, which the Army disapproves of. Frank has a troubling encounter with a poor and hungry girl in a refugee camp. The people in the Army teach him a lot about American ways, so different from his upbringing in the lanes of Limerick.

While in the Army in Germany, he gets two weeks leave to visit his family in Ireland, seeing his mother and youngest brothers Michael and Alphie in Limerick, and for one day, his father and paternal grandmother in Toome. He has been sending part of his Army wages to his mother, and she has gained a home with all the modern advantages of plumbing, a refrigerator and space for a garden in the Janesboro neighborhood; she does not move out of the slum house shared with her brother, where she was raised, until Frank arrives. His emotions while in Limerick are strongly mixed, between pride in his U.S. Army status, pleasure at the better life of his youngest brother who attends secondary school, and the hard memories of his own life there, the "dark clouds" in his mind.

Because he has a girlfriend, Emer, in New York City, Frank leaves the army at his earliest opportunity, being commended for his exceptional service as a clerk-typist by his superior officers. He returns to New York City, where he breaks up with Emer, because she had started going out with a man working in the insurance business. Because of this, and to get his girlfriend back, Frank tries to study to work in the Blue Cross Blue Shield, but quickly gets bored, and lets Emer go, preferring to be single in New York, going out drinking with his pals. He attends New York University – despite never having graduated from high school. The G.I. Bill pays for university tuition, but he needs to work to pay for food and lodging. He takes jobs at warehouses at the docks, and then office jobs from a temporary job service, using his typing skills gained in the Army, continuing to meet many friends and interesting characters. He has some friends who are recent immigrants from Ireland as well as many friends born in the U.S. He falls in love with beautiful, middle-class American-born Alberta Small (nicknamed Mike), whom he meets at university.

While never forgetting the songs of Ireland, he picks up a taste for American jazz music of the 1950s.

His brother Malachy is in New York; he opts to serve in the U.S. Air Force. Malachy and Michael, Frank's younger brother, send part of their Air Force wages to their mother, so Frank has only himself to support while he finishes his courses at NYU.

After graduating from NYU, he teaches English and social studies at McKee Vocational and Technical High School on Staten Island. After eight years there and some time as a substitute at a few colleges and high schools, he moves on to teaching English and creative writing at Stuyvesant High School. At Stuyvesant, he revises his teaching style to end his reliance on textbooks and other teaching resources, to become a teacher of these students.

His brothers, Malachy and Michael, became well known in New York while Frank is teaching at McKee; Malachy has a bar, and a knack for attracting the rich and famous to it with his stories and easy laughter. Michael has similar talents. Frank's students ask him why he is not on television being interviewed, like his entertaining brothers. When someone at Malachy's bar asks him when he will join Malachy and Michael in the bar, he says, when my brothers become teachers; showing his sense of humor to the world, even when the dark clouds are on his mind. He flies to Ireland in the summer to see his mother and his youngest brother.

His mother comes to New York for Christmas of 1959, 10 years after Frank arrived, wanting to see her first grandchild, Malachy's daughter. Her youngest son Alphie is in America for the first time, 19 years old. They both stay in New York, the five of them together in New York, their dream for so long. Frank and Alberta are living together in Brooklyn, and they marry in the summer of 1961.

In 1971, Frank and his wife have a daughter, Margaret Ann, called Maggie. Frank names her after his sister who died in infancy, and his two grandmothers, who are described in Angela's Ashes. He takes care of her as an infant, spending as much time as he can with her as she grows up, sharing early mornings with her, as he had shared early mornings with his father. The family lives in a house in Brooklyn, which Frank and Alberta have fixed up in modern style, with both of them working as teachers.

Frank's father comes to New York once, in 1963, promising he is a new man, sober, but he arrives drunk on the ship that brings him. His three-week visit is long enough, and he returns to Northern Ireland. Eventually, Frank's relationship with his wife turns sour. Frank leaves when their daughter is 8 years old, an action he compares to that of his father leaving his family. Frank, however, keeps seeing his daughter as she grows up, and he always has a job.

Frank's mother, Angela McCourt, is in increasingly poor health due to emphysema and dies in New York in 1981. For his daughter Maggie, her first experience of death is losing her grandmother. Frank had lost three young siblings, many school friends, and his own grandmother by his daughter's age.

Frank's father, Malachy McCourt, Sr., dies in Northern Ireland in early 1985. Frank goes to Belfast with Alphie to bury their father. In August that year, Frank and his family went to Dublin and Limerick to scatter his mother's ashes. The book ends after Frank and his brothers scatter Angela's ashes over the graves of her family.

== Book titles ==
"'Tis" was the final and only word of the last chapter of Angela's Ashes, while 'Tis ends with the spreading of Angela McCourt's ashes in Ireland. Frank McCourt has remarked in several interviews, perhaps jokingly, that he originally intended for each book to have the other's title.

Frank McCourt followed this book with another memoir, Teacher Man.

== Character list ==
- Frank McCourt: The narrator and author of the book and an immigrant from Ireland, he has a deep love for literature. He marries Alberta after attending NYU. He taught as a school teacher for the latter part of his life, despite many offers to work for higher pay in the auto industry and loading docks.
- Alberta Small: Also known as "Mike" during her college years. She and Frank meet in college during one of their classes together. Frank is in love with her from first meeting. She studies to become a teacher. She has trouble dealing with Frank's frequent drinking, but they eventually marry.
- Tom Clifford: Frank's roommate and workmate after his time in the Army. Tom eventually leaves for Detroit to work in an auto factory, and urges Frank to join him. Frank declines, citing his desire to go to college as reason to stay in New York.
- Margaret Ann: Frank and Alberta's daughter, she is named after Frank's deceased baby sister, Margaret.
- Andy Peters: A man Frank meets at NYU, who tells him of a good late shift job at a bank, typing loan application paperwork. Andy changes approvals for loans when he sees the day shift clearly erred in turning a person down. Andy is an NYU student in philosophy, age 31, who got a dishonorable discharge from the Army in World War II for dubious reasons at age 19, which bars him from a normal job. Frank meets him again in the summer of 1959, where Andy is working at a restaurant, having given up on NYU, and still unable to get any job requiring an application form asking about his military discharge. Andy moves on a week later.
- Horace: A black Jamaican who befriends Frank at the warehouse where they work. Horace has a son in college in Canada; he encourages Frank to finish college, giving Frank the support his own father is not supplying.

== Content and structure ==
The title of the book comes from the last sentence of the previous memoir, "Tis", McCourt's answer to the rhetorical question, "Isn't this a great country altogether?" asked of him following his first night in America.

The story is told mainly in chronological order, while adding some incidents from his childhood, as they are the topics of essays for his college classes or stories he tells his students.

== Critical reception ==
L.S. Keep of Entertainment Weekly, described the memoir as a good successor of Angela's Ashes, concluding that "this book has the same clairvoyant eye for quirks of class, character, and fate, and also a distinct picaresque quality. It's a quest for an America of wholesome Hollywood happiness that doesn't exist, and it's about the real America — rendered with comic affection — that McCourt discovers along the way. " Similarly, Margo Hammond of the St. Petersburg Times found the memoir a good read, though McCourt was unable to provide a satisfactory narrative arc to the work. Commenting for the public radio station WKMS, Jacque Day called the memoir "an exercise in humanity by a man with a rare gift for a story, and a brogue that sings on." A review of 'Tis: A Memoir, first published in 1999, in the Tampa Bay Times noted the difference in McCourt's clear insight into his parents' choices compared to his understanding of his own motives, said that "McCourt's memoir actually is all the more human for this peculiar lack of reflection from an author that has seemed so uncannily perceptive in so many other areas. It reminds us once again that poverty doesn't necessarily ennoble people. We can only hope that the scars are few for those fortunate enough to survive it as successfully as Frank McCourt."

Terry Golway opens his review with the statement that "You have to be Irish to hate Frank McCourt." That reflects the candor, brutal candor, of Frank McCourt's writing on his life in New York city, following his first memoir on his life in Ireland. Golway compares McCourt's effect on Irish-Americans to that of Philip Roth on Jewish-Americans: "Mr. McCourt is to the Irish of the late 1990's what Philip Roth was to Jewish Americans in the late 1960's." His review in The New York Observer goes on to state that "'Tis is a remarkable and brutally candid exploration of one man's life in New York, and Mr. McCourt is as tough on himself as he is on the racists and drunks and lost souls he meets along the way."

The memoir has been criticized for ignoring McCourt's marriage to psychotherapist Cheryl Floyd, which followed his divorce from Alberta.
