= Teacher Man =

2005 book by Frank McCourt

- Author: Frank McCourt
- Language: English
- Genre: Memoir
- Publisher: Scribner
- Publication place: United States
- English publication date: November 15, 2005
- Pages: 272
- ISBN: 978-0-7432-4377-3

Teacher Man is a 2005 memoir written by Frank McCourt which describes and reflects on his development as a teacher in New York high schools and colleges. It is in continuation to his earlier two memoirs, Angela's Ashes and 'Tis.

== Prologue ==
The book begins with a prologue, in which the author acknowledges the changes that took place in him because he wrote the first memoir. He became famous, the book sold in the millions and in many languages, a wholly unexpected result. He met many new people in his fame, especially other authors. He demonstrated the changes in himself by listing all the people and institutions that made his childhood so difficult leaving burdens of guilt he thought were his alone, and forgave them one by one. He had a "second act" in his life, and writing the first book, more so than telling the stories to students or putting them on stage, brought him to a point of maturity, able to shed the pain and guilt that impeded his happiness in life.

== Synopsis ==
The memoir describes Frank McCourt's pedagogy, which involves the students taking responsibility for their own learning, especially in his first school, McKee Vocational and Technical High School, on Staten Island in New York City. On the first day he nearly gets fired for eating a sandwich, which a boy had thrown in front of his desk, and the second day he nearly gets fired for joking that in Ireland, people go out with sheep after a student asks them if Irish people date. Much of his early teaching involves telling anecdotes about his childhood in Ireland in response to questions from his students, which incidents were mainly covered in his earlier books Angela's Ashes and 'Tis. He explains the continuing effort of adolescents to divert him from the lessons he wants to teach; he slowly realizes the stories can be part of teaching English, as the stories have structure just like the novels the students are reading, and he uses the stories to segue into the course material. It benefits him to verbalize his upbringing and hear the reactions of the students, a topic he expected to leave behind him when he sailed to America.

McCourt then teaches English as a Second Language, and also a class of predominantly African-American female students, whom he took to a production of Hamlet. He writes about his teacher certification test when he was asked about George Santayana, of whom he was ignorant, but later gives an excellent lesson to a class on the war poets Wilfred Owen and Siegfried Sassoon, whose poems he knew well. Other highlights include his connection between how a pen works and how a sentence works; he did not feel strong in the topic of diagramming sentences, but did want to get across the basics. The school administration was impressed with this idea and some of the students grasped the point. His use of realia such as using students' forged excuse notes as a segue to writing with scenarios is another highlight of his teaching style, keeping the students involved.

At his wife's request, he undertakes therapy, one on one and then a few sessions in group therapy. He was uncomfortable in the group and stopped attending it. The only breakthrough noted by the therapist was McCourt's statement that he is at ease in the classroom but not comfortable outside the classroom, and wants the ease in social situations that his wife has, that his brother Malachy has. His restlessness continues.

Before his daughter is born in 1971, McCourt goes to Trinity College for a doctorate degree, living in Dublin for two years with a break in between to vacation with his wife. He did not expect how much he would be an outsider in Dublin, both as an American and his roots in Ireland being in Limerick. He finds it hard to connect with the people living there, as he had connected in New York City. He had a topic for a dissertation. He researches his topic extensively, with organized notes. He comes home as the birth of Maggie nears. He is unsettled about life, about himself, and cannot complete the dissertation by continuing the work in New York City, so he goes back to teaching.

After returning to New York, his daughter changes his views on life, giving him much happiness.

When his daughter is 8 years old, he and his wife separate and divorce, with Frank moving out on his own as he continues teaching at Stuyvesant High School. Frank is still unsettled, working hard to figure out what he needs to do to achieve peace. He is hard on himself, for how hard it is for him to grow as he wants to grow, how many things he realizes as an adult that he suspects most teens know already. He stays strong in teaching, and as much as he can, sees how he can grow as a teacher and a person, even as his main goal is teaching his students.

He taught from the time he was twenty-seven and continued for thirty years. He spent most of his teaching career at Stuyvesant High School, where he taught English and creative writing with success for the students and a good experience for him, the teacher. His classes at Stuyvesant were popular with students and the school administration supported him in his developing approach to teaching, which included many creative turns, such as having the students read restaurant reviews for their structure, and then writing reviews of their school cafeteria and local eateries. On another day, students brought foods from home, enough for all in the class, and had their vocabulary lessons in the park near the school. The students have varied backgrounds and the foods they bring reflect the cuisines of the world. Next they read recipes from cook books, which turns into an event with musical accompaniment, as many students can play instruments well. One student realizes and shares with the class how the recipes are like poetry. The theme through all those experiences in his classes is that writers are always observing, seeking what is happening around them so they can both decide their own next actions and describe what they see in straightforward language.

== Reception ==
Literary critic Michiko Kakutani writing in The New York Times found text to like in this book, but finds it lacking the charm of the first memoir, and better organized than the second. McCourt exhorts his students in the writing class at Stuyvesant High school when he interrogates them about their dinner the night before, which is "an exercise in observation and family dynamics, of course—a lesson to his students that 'you are your material.'" The reviewer feels that McCourt succeeded in this in his first memoir, but it is "a lesson he tries to resurrect, with less success, in this tepid new book."

The review in Kirkus Reviews is more positive, finding rich material in McCourt's growth as a teacher of high school students in New York City. Recalling the prior book 'Tis: A Memoir and its style, "The same dark humor, lyric voice and gift for dialogue are apparent here". McCourt begins with the scary first day of teaching his own class at a vocational high school. After many years in vocational high schools, he gains a position at another public school, Stuyvesant High School, which had much competition for entry. The reviewer felt that "McCourt’s self-deprecating tone diminishes in this section, for now this innovative teacher is given free rein, and it is clear that he’s having a grand time.", citing one of the more memorable vocabulary lessons. The review is summed up by saying that "The teaching profession’s loss is the reading public’s gain, entirely."

Thomas Hansen, a former teacher who moved up to the Illinois State Board of Education, reviewed this book and found it "a wonderful one if people are into teaching". McCourt "includes some of the funniest passages I have ever seen in a book. His style and his ability to manipulate the reader—through the use of sardonic and twisting adventures—are enthralling aspects of his writing." Regarding McCourt himself, says that "Teachers will all see through a lot of his yarns and predicaments … discovering underneath a lot of the foolishness of everyday life the author’s ability to teach. ... he is always a teacher."

Rebecca Seal in The Guardian concludes that "At times McCourt can be a deeply frustrating protagonist, but this is, none the less, a really good read." Where the experienced teacher reviewing the book sees through every device, this reviewer notes that "The only place he [McCourt] ever seems to have belonged was in front of a class, ... although it's difficult to know whether his self-deprecation is disingenuousness or exaggeration, or if he really was as shy, miserable and irrational as he portrays himself to be." The contrast of reviews may point up that those who have been teachers can see through the devices of his style to understand the quality of this teacher. The memoir has "the lilting style and phonetic writing that marked out his last two books".

Hillel Italie in the Los Angeles Times describes Frank McCourt, writing Teacher Man as his third and probably last memoir "proved with Angela’s Ashes that publishing was not just a young person’s game and that you didn’t need to be famous to get millions to care about your story." This third memoir continues his story, describing his development as a teacher, including many anecdotes from his classes, and the work to teach five classes of high school students every day, always regaining their attention if some slip of his tongue caused them not to pay attention. McCourt was asked if he would have liked to have been an author earlier in his life, not teaching five classes a day for so many years. His reply begins as he "quickly shakes his head. On the good days, and there were many, he never felt so alive, caught up in the currents of adolescent energy. And McCourt brought his own spark, like having the students write each other’s obituaries or set recipes to music." Italie interviewed a student of McCourt from his years at Stuyvesant High School who is now an author herself: "Susan Gilman, remembers McCourt as an innovative and charismatic teacher so popular that students would “forget their program cards” to get in his class. For Gilman, the McCourt legend preceded meeting him." She went on to describe McCourt as "“a very quiet guy, unlike the rest of the rabble,” Hamill says with a laugh. “He had a low-key, wicked sense of humor."

Jacki Lyden interviewed Frank McCourt and referred to Teacher Man as an "amusing and grim chronicle" of his life as a high school teacher; she remarked favorably on his use of language in the book, mentioning one phrase about the students "turning pages like lead" when they were not happy. The title of the book emerges from his second day of teaching at McKee Vocational High School, when one student both asked a question that framed McCourt's teaching style for the next 30 years, and then would not pick up on and use McCourt's name, but called him, "yo, teach" and then "yo, teacher man", when asking his question. The prologue from Teacher Man is reprinted at the web page; the interview is audio.
