= Angela's Ashes =

1996 memoir by Frank McCourt

- First edition cover
- Author: Frank McCourt
- Language: English
- Genre: autobiography, misery memoir
- Publisher: Scribner
- Publication date: 5 September 1996
- Publication place: Ireland
- Pages: 368
- Awards: 1997 Pulitzer Prize for Biography or Autobiography; 1996 National Book Critics Circle Award (Biography); 1996 Los Angeles Times Book Prize; 1997 Boeke Prize
- ISBN: 0-684-87435-0
- OCLC: 34284265
- Dewey Decimal: 929/.2/0899162073 20
- LC Class: E184.I6 M117 1996
- Followed by: 'Tis

Angela's Ashes: A Memoir is a 1996 memoir by the Irish-American author Frank McCourt, with various anecdotes and stories of his childhood. The book details his early childhood in Brooklyn, New York, but focuses primarily on his life in Limerick, Ireland. It also includes his struggles with poverty and his father's alcoholism.

The book was published in 1996 and won the 1997 Pulitzer Prize for Biography or Autobiography. The sequel 'Tis was published in 1999, followed by Teacher Man in 2005.

== Synopsis ==
The narrative is told from the point of view of Frank McCourt as a child. Born in Brooklyn, New York on 19 August 1930, Frank (Francis) McCourt is the oldest son of Malachy McCourt and Angela Sheehan McCourt. Both of his parents immigrated from Ireland and married in a shotgun wedding over Angela's pregnancy with Frankie. Angela is from Limerick, Ireland, and she is fond of music, singing, and dancing. Malachy, from Northern Ireland, is an alcoholic known for his having an "odd manner" and for telling stories about Irish heroes. Frankie is said to resemble his father, having a hang-dog face and the same "odd manner."

In Brooklyn, the McCourts live in modern tenement housing next to a park and share a floor, and an indoor lavatory, with other immigrant families. Frankie has four younger siblings in Brooklyn: Malachy, born in 1931; twins Oliver and Eugene, born in 1932; and an infant sister, Margaret, in 1935.

The family struggles with poverty because Malachy Sr's efforts to find work are complicated by his alcoholism. The family's prospects, and Angela's spirits, lift whenever he finds a new job and brings home his wages, but soon he spends all of his pay in pubs despite Angela's efforts to prevent him from doing so. Malachy Sr loses each job after a few weeks as a result of his heavy drinking.

Margaret's birth instills new life into the family: The whole family falls in love with her, Malachy Sr most of all. He stops drinking and finds steady work to support the family. Due to her parents' ignorance of childhood disease, Margaret lives for only seven weeks. With her death, Malachy Sr goes on an alcoholic binge, and Angela suffers severe depression. Frank, age 4, feeds and cares for his younger siblings until the neighbours help. The neighbours contact Angela's cousins, who in turn recommend the family return to Ireland. Angela is pregnant as they return to Ireland from America, but she loses the child shortly after moving to Limerick.

The Great Depression strikes Ireland even harder than it does the United States. The family first goes to Malachy's family home in Toome in County Antrim, where his parents tell them there is no work. He tries Dublin, hoping for a pension from his fighting days, but that does not materialise. They settle in Angela's original hometown of Limerick. Conditions for poor families are miserable. Malachy Sr finds it difficult to find work because of his Northern Irish accent and mannerisms, and the boys are mocked for their American accents.

The family is forced to rely on the dole and charity from the local Society of Saint Vincent de Paul, which requires a humiliating application process. Angela and Malachy Sr argue about their conditions, Malachy spends the welfare money meant to feed the family, and he views Angela's asking for charity as degrading. The young family subsists on little more than bread and tea.

Within a year of the family's arrival, Oliver and Eugene also die. Oliver dies first, and then Eugene, a few months later, from grieving the loss of his twin and pneumonia. After each death, Angela is depressed, and the family moves to another house. Each move is a slide into worse circumstances. They settle in a slum house. The entire ground floor floods for half the year, requiring the family to live in the upstairs rooms, called Italy, until the rains cease, when they again have access to the ground floor, Ireland. Their house is next to the only lavatory on the street. The traffic of families dumping chamber pots in the lavatory is offensive. Two more baby brothers, Michael (born 1936), and Alphie (Alphonsus Joseph, b. 1940), are born in Limerick.

Frankie grows up in Limerick as an intelligent boy, but always hungry. He makes unique observations about those around him. His strict Catholic upbringing in the local public school preys on him: Will he be going to hell? This plagues his mind as soon as he has been taught to make confession at age 7. He sees his father as three people: the man who rises early in the morning and talks with Frank; the man who tells stories to his sons in the evening; and the man who drinks too much, sings old songs, and asks his young sons to promise to die for Ireland.

Frank gets typhoid fever at age 10, and he is taken to the hospital for months, where for the first time he has adequate food, warmth, clean sheets, and access to books with the time to read them. Frankie contracts chronic conjunctivitis the next year, which does not heal, requiring treatments.

When the U.S. joins World War 2, many Limerick men, including Malachy Sr, find work at defence plants in Coventry, England, and they send money home. The first payment from Malachy Sr allows the family to buy food and pay the rent. Soon after, the money stops coming, and at age 11, Frank is the man of the house.

When their mother is ill, Frank and his brothers steal leftover food from restaurants and grocery deliveries from doorsteps of wealthier homes until they are sent to stay with their aunt while their mother recuperates in the hospital.

After a humorous few weeks of burning the second floor wall for the cooking fire, the family is evicted and homeless. At her mother's suggestion, Angela and her children move in with her bachelor cousin, Laman Griffin, who is a petty tyrant. Frank endures this treatment until the day after his schooling ends in June, and he is promised the loan of Laman's bicycle to join his friends, but Laman reneges on his promise. Added to this disappointment, Laman's deal to provide housing includes a sexual relationship with Angela. Frankie fights with Laman, and he is thrown out of the house. Shortly after, Malachy Jr leaves Laman Griffin's to join the British military as a bugle boy.

Frankie moves in with his maternal uncle, a simple man who was "dropped on his head as a child" and lives alone in the house. Frank gets a job as a telegram delivery boy on his 14th birthday and enjoys his first wages. He meets many unexpected situations while delivering telegrams, including his first girlfriend, who dies of tuberculosis. He meets Mrs Finucane who buys clothes for people at a discount, and then they pay her back over time for the full price; she asks Frank to write threatening letters to encourage them to repay these loans. He tells no one about this job, which he has until she dies.

A few months after he moves, the rest of the family follows him to the house. Frank now turns over the majority of his wages to his mother. He works for the post office until he is 16, and he finds a job with Eason's, a company that supplies magazines and newspapers to Limerick stores.

On his 16th birthday, Frank's uncle takes him to the pub to buy him his first beer. Frank gets drunk and heads home. When his mother shames him for drinking like his father, Frank hits her, accusing her of being a whore for Laman Griffin, and he is immediately ashamed of himself.

Shortly before he turns 19, Frank returns to Mrs Finucane’s home to find she has died. Frank takes some of the money from her purse and throws her ledger of debtors into the river to free the neighborhood of their debts. This freedom from the debt gives him enough money to sail to New York. Frank arrives in Poughkeepsie, New York where the ship docks, and he agrees with a ship's crew man that it is a great country.

== Character list ==
McCourt family

- Francis McCourt: The writer of the book and main character. Frank is a religious, determined, and intelligent Irish American who struggles to find happiness and success in the harsh community.
- Malachy McCourt: Frank's father and an alcoholic. Though his addiction almost ruins the family, Mr. McCourt manages to obtain his children's affection by telling Irish stories.
- Angela McCourt, née Sheehan: Frank's hardworking mother who puts her family first and holds high expectations for her children. She is also humorous and witty.
- Malachy (Jr.): Frank's younger and supposedly more attractive and charming brother.
- Oliver: Frank's brother, twin to Eugene, who dies at an early age in Ireland.
- Eugene: Frank's brother, who dies of pneumonia six months after Oliver, his twin.
- Margaret: Frank's only little sister, who dies in her sleep in the United States.
- Michael: Frank's brother.
- Alphonsus: Frank's youngest brother.
- Aunt Aggie: Frank's childless aunt. She does not approve of Angela's husband or how Angela is raising and caring for her children, but is helpful and loyal nonetheless.
- Uncle Pa Keating: Aunt Aggie's husband, who is especially fond of Eugene.
- Uncle Pat Sheehan: Angela's brother, who was dropped on the head when he was young.
- Grandma: Angela's mother and Frank's grandmother, who sends Angela money to come to Ireland.

Others

- Paddy Clohessy: a poor boy in the same class as Frank, who considers Frank a friend after Frank shares with him a much-coveted raisin.
- Brendan "Question" Quigley, occasionally (not to mention, inconsistently) referred to as Brendan Kieley: another classmate of Frank's, who often gets into trouble because of his tendency to ask too many questions.
- Fintan Slattery: a classmate of Frank's who invites Frank and Paddy over for lunch, but proceeds to eat all of it in front of them without offering them any. It is implied that he has homosexual tendencies.
- Mikey Molloy: son of Nora Molloy, who is older than Frank, has seizures, and is the "expert on girls' bodies and dirty things".
- Patricia Madigan: a patient at the Fever Hospital who befriends Frank and tells him bits of poetry, notably "The Highwayman" by Alfred Noyes, but dies before she can tell him the rest of the poem.
- Seamus: the hospital janitor who helps Frank and Patricia communicate, and later recites poetry to Frank in the eye hospital.
- Mr. Timoney: an old man who pays Frank to read books to him.
- Dotty O’Neill: Frank's somewhat eccentric 4th class teacher who loves Euclid.
- Mr. O’Dea: Frank's 5th class teacher and headmaster
- Theresa Carmody: a 17-year-old consumptive girl with whom Frank has a sexual relationship. Frank desperately worries about the fate of Theresa's soul, which he fears he is jeopardizing by having premarital sex with her.
- Mickey Spellacy: a friend of Frank who, anticipating his sister's death, promises Frank he can come to the wake and eat some of the food.
- Mrs. Brigid Finucane: Frank delivers a telegram to her, and then works for her by writing threatening letters to people who owe her money. Mrs. Finucane bought clothes for people at a discount, and they repaid her the full price in time. Frank tells no one that he is writing these letters, even when he hears his mother and various neighbors complaining about them.
- Laman Griffin: Angela's cousin, whom she is compelled to sleep with during the family's time living at his house.

== Literary significance and reception ==
Michiko Kakutani concluded her review in The New York Times of Angela's Ashes by writing "The reader of this stunning memoir can only hope that Mr. McCourt will set down the story of his subsequent adventures in America in another book. Angela's Ashes is so good it deserves a sequel." McCourt "has used the storytelling gifts he inherited from his father to write a book that redeems the pain of his early years with wit and compassion and grace." The book is compared "with The Liars Club by Mary Karr and Andre Aciman's Out of Egypt as a classic modern memoir." McCourt writes without bitterness about his epic tale of woe, though "there is plenty a less generous writer might well be judgmental about." The review is peppered with quotations from the book showing the author's style. Kakutani remarks that "Writing in prose that's pictorial and tactile, lyrical but streetwise, Mr. McCourt does for the town of Limerick what the young Joyce did for Dublin: he conjures the place for us with such intimacy that we feel we've walked its streets and crawled its pubs." This review is strong in its analysis of the book as well-written and modern, comparable with great writers. The scope of the "memoir is not just the story of his family's struggles, but the story of his own sentimental education: his discovery of poetry and girls, and his efforts to come to terms with God and death and faith. By 11, he's the chief breadwinner for the family. By 15, he's lost his first girlfriend to tuberculosis. By 19, he's saved enough money to make his escape to the States."

In its review, Kirkus Reviews has strong praise: "An extraordinary work in every way. McCourt magically retrieves love, dignity, and humor from a childhood of hunger, loss and pain." This is the first book by McCourt. It is "a powerful, exquisitely written debut, a recollection of the author's miserable childhood in the slums of Limerick, Ireland, during the Depression and World War II."

Nina King wrote in The Washington Post that "This memoir is an instant classic of the genre -- all the more remarkable for being the 66-year-old McCourt's first book." She summarized her review by saying that "Angela's Ashes confirms the worst old stereotypes about the Irish, portraying them as drunken, sentimental, bigoted, bloody-minded dreamers, repressed sexually and oppressed politically, nursing ancient grievances while their children (their far-too-many children) go hungry. ... at the same time that it transcends them through the sharpness and precision of McCourt's observation and the wit and beauty of his prose."

Reviewing the book at its publication in 1996, John Blades wrote in the Chicago Tribune that "Like McCourt himself, Angela's Ashes is a bundle of contradictions, as uproarious as they are grievous, whether the young Frankie is pushing his baby brother around Limerick, dumping loose coal and turf into his pram; his "pious, defeated" mother is begging a sheep's head for their Christmas dinner; or his soused father is rousing the boys in the middle of the night to sing "Kevin Barry" and other patriotic Irish songs." The book event was held in at the Mercury Theater and the adjoining Chicago bar; the book is a debut for McCourt but he had "been a familiar figure on local stages during the '80s. Billing themselves as "A Couple of Blaguards," he and his younger brother, Malachy, re-enacted their Limerick boyhood in story, song and verse for audiences at the Royal George and other theaters." McCourt's book places "McCourt's mother, Angela, [as] the nominal heroine of his memoir, eternally on the dole, pathetically trying to clothe and feed her sons. But it's the blackguard father, also named Malachy, who obsesses McCourt, and who commandeers center stage in his memoir, long after he's abandoned his wife and family." At the book event, McCourt notes that most of the reviews of his memoir call it "lyrical and charming," but he says that "what gives Irish writing its distinctive flavor is not the charming stuff but the darkness."

In a review of the book and its audio book version released in 1997, Gayle Sims wrote that it is the "only book that I unequivocally recommend listening to instead of reading." She explains why the narration makes a better experience than reading on paper, as the author "reads the narrative in his everyday dialect, yet he is able to give it the voice of a child. This works particularly well because Angela's Ashes is written from a child's unjudging perspective." Although the tough, challenging and sad events of his childhood might present a negative story to the reader or listener, "The book is full of tears and laughter. McCourt is forgiving of his family's tragic life. When he reads, there is no rancor in his voice."

Writing a review in 2020, Ashley Nelson stated "This story is challenging to the emotions; it deals with many elements and situations that make people uncomfortable. However, it has you holding back laughter, as Frank McCourt has this magical ability to make light of being starving in the pouring rain walking through the streets of Limerick. This book has you feel love, loss, fear, hunger, and the will to overcome uncertainty." This book is a "quintessential coming of age story viewed through the grimy, unyielding, and sometimes downright heartbreaking lens of poverty. It follows Frank McCourt as he comically explains the dire circumstances of his conception, birth, and life."

== Background ==
After traveling to America (where the book ends), McCourt worked at the Biltmore Hotel in New York City, where he remained until 1951. He was drafted during the Korean War to be stationed in Bavaria, Germany. After being discharged, he returned to New York and dabbled with several different jobs until he was accepted into New York University. After graduating in 1957 with a bachelor's degree in English, McCourt turned to teaching in New York schools. He then obtained his master's degree and traveled to Dublin in pursuit of his PhD, which he never completed.

== Awards ==
Angela's Ashes won several awards, including the 1997 Pulitzer Prize for Biography or Autobiography, the 1996 National Book Critics Circle Award (Biography), and the 1997 Boeke Prize.

Frank McCourt was elected Irish American of the Year in 1998.

== Disputed memories ==
McCourt was accused of exaggerating his family's impoverished upbringing by many Limerick natives, including Richard Harris. McCourt's mother denied the accuracy of his stories shortly before her death in 1981, walking out of a stage performance by her two elder sons; Malachy's recollection is that she said it was "all a pack of lies."

Local writer and filmmaker Gerry Hannan has compiled a list of 204 inaccuracies in Angela's Ashes; Hannan confronted McCourt on The Late Late Show in 1999. Hannan claimed that McCourt was a member of the Boy Scouts, a middle-class pursuit the poor could not afford, and family photographs show the children and Angela as well-fed.

American journalist John Meyer visited Limerick and took the tour of the city sparked by publication of the book. He realized how much the city had changed since McCourt's childhood years, including destruction of the slum area where his family lived when Frank was in school.

McCourt described the book as "a memoir, not an exact history", and admitted to fabricating a story about classmate Willie Harrold. Similarly, Alan Parker, who directed the film version, said that Angela's Ashes "was a work of art which met Gore Vidal's definition of autobiography, being an 'impression' of a life, rather than a memoir."

== Adaptations ==
=== Film ===
In 1999 a film version was released. It was co-written and directed by Alan Parker starring Joe Breen, Ciarán Owens, and Michael Legge, as the Young, Middle and Older Frank McCourt respectively and Emily Watson as McCourt's mother Angela, Robert Carlyle as the father.

The film begins when the McCourt family move back to Ireland after experiencing hardship in America. Many of the Street scenes were filmed in Cork, Ireland. The film soundtrack was composed and conducted by John Williams, and features songs by Billie Holiday and Sinéad O'Connor.

=== Musical ===
A stage musical adaptation of Angela's Ashes by Adam Howell (Music & Lyrics) and Paul Hurt (Book) received its world premiere at the Lime Tree Theatre, Limerick on July 6, 2017 with following performances at the Bord Gáis Energy Theatre, Dublin and the Grand Opera House, Belfast. McCourt's wife, Ellen Frey McCourt, remarked about making a musical from that memoir, before it opened in Limerick, that "The movie does not have the humour of the book, or that this musical has.” Moreover, she adds, “if you think about it, was Sweeney Todd a good example of a musical subject? Or Oliver!, or Annie? There’s a silver lining in each of these shows, and Angela's Ashes is really a story about a family triumphing over adversity."

== See also ==
- Misery literature
