= Hypocrite in a Pouffy White Dress =

2005 book by Susan Jane Gilman

- Author: Susan Jane Gilman
- Language: English
- Genre: Memoir
- Publication date: 2005
- Publication place: United States
- ISBN: 978-0-446-67949-7

In her 2005 New York Times Bestselling memoir, Hypocrite in a Pouffy White Dress: Tales of Growing up Groovy and Clueless, modern day feminist Susan Jane Gilman recounts her life growing up in New York City during the 1970s.

In the forward, Gilman herself admits that “It’s [her] hope that these 'coming of age' stories will make readers laugh, and prove once and for all that a girl doesn't need a guy in her life in order to act like a complete idiot."
