= Susan Jane Gilman =

American novelist (born 1964)

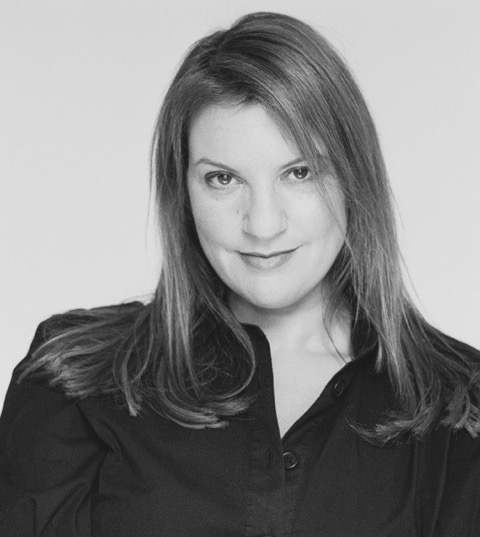
- Born: October 22, 1964 (age 61); New York City, U.S.
- Education: Stuyvesant High School; Brown University (BA); University of Michigan (MFA)
- Occupations: Writer; novelist
- Website: www.susanjanegilman.com

Susan Jane Gilman (born October 22, 1964) is an American writer and novelist. She is the author of two novels, The Ice Cream Queen of Orchard Street (2014) and Donna Has Left the Building (2019) in addition to three non-fiction books: Undress Me in the Temple of Heaven (2009); Hypocrite in a Pouffy White Dress (2005); and Kiss My Tiara (2001).

== Early life and education ==
Gilman was born in New York City and grew up on the Upper West Side of Manhattan. She attended Stuyvesant High School in New York City and was a student of Frank McCourt. Gilman attended Brown University where she got a B.A. in 1986. She received a Masters' in Fine Arts in Creative Writing from the University of Michigan in 1993.

== Career ==
She has written for several newspapers and magazines including the New York Times, the L.A. Times, Salon, the Guardian, Real Simple, Good Housekeeping, and Ms. magazine.

She has been a contributor to NPR's "All Things Considered," and won literary awards for her journalism, short fiction, and audio book recordings.

Kiss My Tiara, Gilman's first book, is a smart-ass reaction to the advice that women are given. She implores women to get "a life not husband".

Hypocrite in a Pouffy White Dress, a New York Times Bestseller is a memoir of the author growing up in New York City. The topics range from growing up with hippy parents, meeting Mick Jagger, getting bullied at school, and moving overseas.

Undress Me in the Temple of Heaven is a true story of the author setting out to backpack across China in 1986 and running into trouble with her friend and Chinese authorities.

The Ice Cream Queen of Orchard Street is the author's first novel. It follows the rise and fall of Lillian Dunkle, a Russian immigrant who arrives in America as a child in 1914 and goes on become the doyenne of an empire of ice cream franchises over the course of 70 years.

Gilman's second novel, Donna Has Left the Building, chronicles Donna Koczynski, a wife, mother, former punk rocker, and recovering alcoholic who blows up her own life and takes off on an epic quest across America that ultimately lands her in the middle of a refugee crisis halfway around the globe.

Her books have been translated into eleven languages.

She made the keynote presentation entitled “There is No Lightning Bolt" at the TedXZurichWomen on May 29, 2015.

== Bibliography ==
- Kiss My Tiara, Warner Books, 2001
- Hypocrite in a Pouffy White Dress, Warner Books, 2005
- Undress Me in the Temple of Heaven, Grand Central Publishing, Hachette, 2009
- The Ice Cream Queen of Orchard Street, Grand Central Publishing, Hachette, 2014
- Donna Has Left the Building, Grand Central Publishing, Hachette, 2019

== Articles ==
- My Rosh HaShanah At A Refugee Camp, New York Jewish Week September 2019

== Awards ==
- Literary Award for Short Fiction, Greensboro Review
- Three Avery Hopwood Awards, University of Michigan, for fiction and nonfiction
- Cowden Memorial fellowship
- Gutterman Poetry Prize
- New York Press Association Award for feature writing, for articles written on assignment in Poland for Jewish Week
