= Skyland Trail =

Nonprofit organization in Atlanta, Georgia, US

Skyland Trail is a private, non-profit organization in Atlanta, Georgia offering treatment to adults ages 18 and older and adolescents ages 14 to 17 with mental illnesses. Skyland Trail specializes in treating adults and adolescents with bipolar disorder, schizophrenia, depression, and anxiety disorders. Many adult patients have co-occurring diagnoses such as substance use disorders, borderline personality disorder, anxiety disorders, and/or a history of trauma.

== History ==
In the early 1980s, Charles B. West, an Atlanta businessman, saw a void in mental illness treatment. The dominant treatment model in Atlanta at the time was hospitalization for acute cases, aimed at stabilization. There was no long-term treatment program that provided therapies that included teaching skills needed to reintegrate patients back into the community.

Through a friend’s experience, West recognized the need, and in 1982, he established The George West Mental Health Foundation, named after his father, and recruited a board of directors. The board studied programs and innovations across the nation that looked beyond short-term stabilization and to long-term recovery.

The first facility opened in 1989, a treatment residence called Skyland Trail, and this name became the foundation’s identity.

In 1995, a second residence, Skyland Trail South, was added for short-term clients and the original residence, Skyland Trail North, became focused on long-term treatment. In 1999, the Skyland Trail Health and Education Center opened in 1999 to serve as administrative headquarters and day treatment facility.

In 2010 the Dorothy C. Fuqua Center opened adjacent to the Health and Education Center, and the two facilities were dedicated as the Charles B. West Campus in 2014 in honor of the organization's founder.

Through a fourth capital campaign in 2014, Skyland Trail purchased land adjacent to the Charles B. West Campus and constructed the Rollins Campus for young adults. The Rollins Campus opened in October 2015 with a residential wing with 32 private rooms dedicated to young adults ages 18 to 24 and a treatment wing with additional therapeutic space and a second dining hall.

In 2019, the J Rex Fuqua campus opened for adolescents 14-17.
