= Alphie McCourt =

Irish-American writer (1940–2016)

Alphonsus Joseph McCourt
- Born: Alphonsus Joseph McCourt; 29 July 1940; Limerick, Ireland
- Died: 2 July 2016 (aged 75); New York City, New York, U.S.
- Occupations: Memoirist; writer
- Spouse: Lynn Rockman (m. 1975)
- Children: 1
- Relatives: Frank McCourt (brother); Malachy McCourt (brother); Michael McCourt (brother)
- Writing career
- Pen name: Alphie

Alphonsus Joseph "Alphie" McCourt (29 July 1940 – 2 July 2016) was an Irish-American writer. He was the youngest brother of Frank McCourt.

== Early life ==
Alphie McCourt was born in Limerick, Ireland on 29 July 1940, the youngest son of Malachy McCourt (1901–1985) and Angela Sheehan (1908–1981).

== Writing ==
Following in the footsteps of his elder brothers Frank McCourt and Malachy McCourt, Alphie had his own memoir A Long Stone's Throw published in 2008. The book was well received. He had published articles in The Washington Post, The Villager and The Limerick Leader prior to writing his memoir.

== Death ==
He died on 2 July 2016, 27 days before his 76th birthday. His brother Michael had died the previous September, 9 months earlier. He was survived by his brother Malachy.
