= Frank McCourt =

Irish-American writer

Francis McCourt
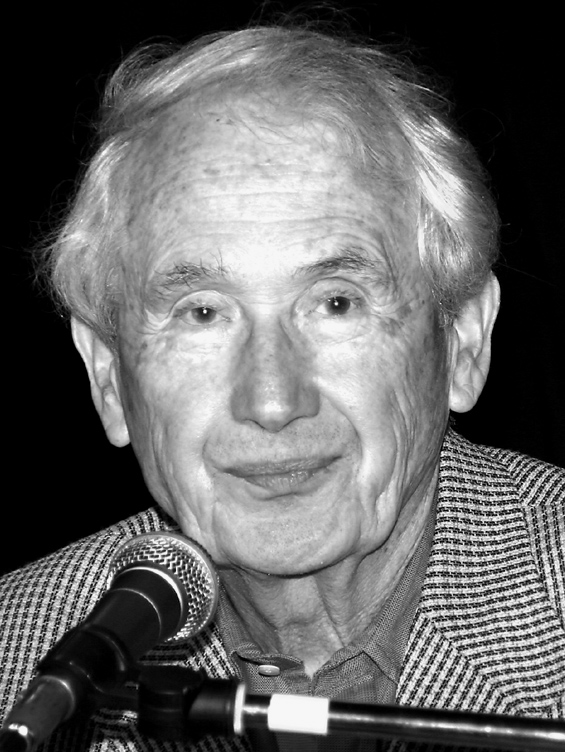
- McCourt in 2006
- Born: Francis McCourt; August 19, 1930; New York City, U.S.
- Died: July 19, 2009 (aged 78); New York City, U.S.
- Citizenship: Irish; American
- Education: New York University; Brooklyn College
- Occupations: Memoirist; writer; teacher
- Notable work: Angela's Ashes (1996) 'Tis (1999); Teacher Man (2005)
- Spouses: Alberta Small (m. 1961; div. 1979); Cheryl Floyd (m. 1984; div. 1989); Ellen Frey (m. 1994)
- Parent(s): Malachy Gerald McCourt, Sr; Angela Sheehan
- Relatives: Malachy McCourt; Michael McCourt; Alphie McCourt
- Family: Maggie McCourt, daughter
- Awards: Pulitzer Prize for Biography or Autobiography in 1997

Signature
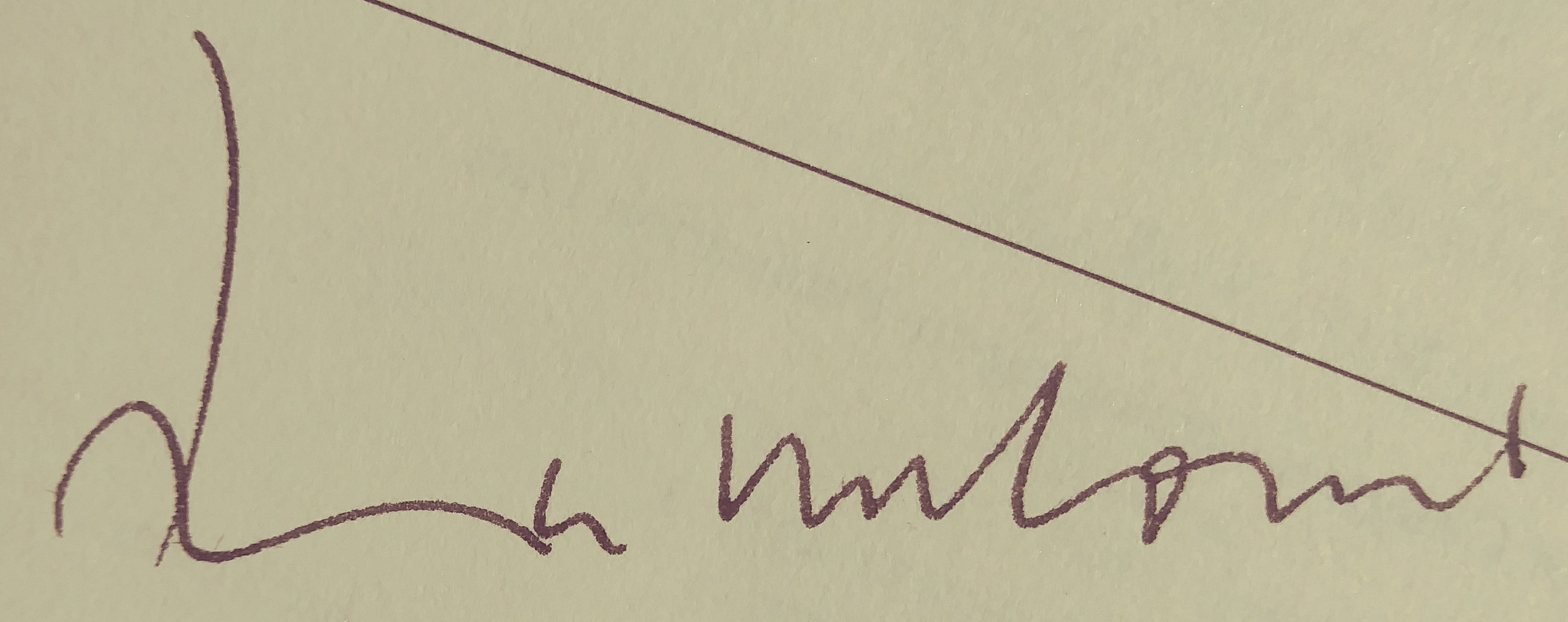

Francis McCourt (August 19, 1930 – July 19, 2009) was an Irish-American teacher and writer. He won a Pulitzer Prize for his book Angela's Ashes, a tragicomic memoir of the misery and squalor of his childhood.

== Early life and education ==
Frank McCourt was born in New York City's Brooklyn borough in Bedford-Stuyvesant, on August 19, 1930, the eldest child of Irish Catholic immigrants Malachy Gerald McCourt, Sr. (October 11, 1899 – January 11, 1985), of Toome, County Antrim, who was aligned with the IRA during the Irish War of Independence, and Angela Sheehan (January 1, 1908 – December 27, 1981) from Limerick. Frank McCourt lived in New York with his parents and four younger siblings: Malachy Jr. (1931–2024); twins Oliver and Eugene, born in 1932; and a younger sister, Margaret, who died just 21 days after birth, on March 5, 1934.

In fall of 1934 in the midst of the Great Depression, the family moved back to Ireland. Frank was 4 years old. His brother Malachy was 3 and the twins were 2 years old. Unable to find steady work in Belfast or Dublin and beset by Malachy Senior's alcoholism, the McCourt family returned to their mother's native Limerick, where they sank even deeper into poverty. They lived in a slum, the parents and children sharing one bed together, McCourt's father drinking away what little money they had. His father, being from the north and bearing a northern accent, found this trait to be an added stressor to finding a job. The twins Oliver and Eugene died in early childhood in consequence of the squalor of their circumstances, and two more boys were born: Michael John, who later lived in San Francisco (where he was called the "Dean of Bartenders") until his death in September 2015; and Alphonsus, who published a memoir of his own and died in 2016. Frank McCourt nearly died of typhoid fever when he was 11.

McCourt related that when he was 11, his father left Limerick to find work in the factories of wartime Coventry, England, rarely sending back money to support his family. McCourt recounts that eventually Malachy Senior abandoned Frank's mother altogether, leaving her to raise her four surviving children, on the edge of starvation, without any source of income. Frank felt obliged as a child to steal bread, milk, and lemonade in an effort to provide for his mother and three younger brothers, until relatives stepped in to aid the family.

Frank's formal education in Limerick ended at age 13, when the Irish Christian Brothers rejected him as a student in their secondary school. Frank then worked for the post office delivering telegrams from age 14 to 16; then he worked for Eason's delivering magazines and newspapers, and he gave most of what he earned to his mother. Less formally and in secret, he wrote debt-collection letters for a local Limerick woman who paid for clothing and other items and allowed debtors to make payments with high interest rates. Frank saved his money and once he had saved enough to pay the fare to New York and have some money upon his arrival, he left Ireland on a freighter, at age 19.

== Career ==
=== Early career ===
In October 1949, at the age of 19, McCourt left Ireland. He had saved money from various jobs including as a telegram delivery boy and stolen from one of his employers, a moneylender, after her death. He took a boat from Cork to New York City. A priest he had met on the ship got him a room to stay in and his job at New York City's Biltmore Hotel. He earned about $26 a week and sent $10 of it to his mother in Limerick. Brothers Malachy and Michael followed him to New York and so, later, did their mother Angela with youngest son Alphie. In 1951, McCourt was drafted into the U.S. Army and sent to Bavaria for two years, initially training dogs, then working as a clerk. Upon discharge, he returned to New York City, where he held a series of jobs on docks, in warehouses, and in banks.

=== Teaching ===
Using his G.I. Bill education benefits, McCourt talked his way into New York University by explaining that he was intelligent and read a great deal; they admitted him on one year's probation provided he maintained a B average. He graduated in 1957 from New York University with a bachelor's degree in English. He taught at six New York schools, including McKee Vocational and Technical High School in Staten Island, New York City College of Technology in Brooklyn, Seward Park High School, Washington Irving High School, and the High School of Fashion Industries, all in Manhattan. In 1967, he earned a master's degree at Brooklyn College, and in the late 1960s he spent 18 months at Trinity College Dublin, failing to earn his PhD before returning to New York City. He became a regular English teacher at Stuyvesant High School after his doctoral studies.

In a 1997 The New York Times essay, McCourt wrote about his experiences teaching immigrant mothers at New York City College of Technology in Brooklyn.

=== Writing ===
External videos
- Presentation by McCourt on Angela's Ashes, September 19, 1996, C-SPAN
- Booknotes interview with McCourt on Angela's Ashes, August 31, 1997, C-SPAN
- Presentation by McCourt on Angela's Ashes, April 15, 1999, C-SPAN
- Presentation by McCourt on Tis: A Memoir, December 7, 1999, C-SPAN
- Presentation by McCourt on Teacher Man, December 8, 2005, C-SPAN

McCourt won the annual Pulitzer Prize for Biography or Autobiography (1997) and one of the annual National Book Critics Circle Awards (1996) for his bestselling 1996 memoir Angela's Ashes, which details his impoverished childhood from Brooklyn to Limerick. Three years later, a movie version of Angela's Ashes opened to mixed reviews. Northern Irish actor Michael Legge played McCourt as a teenager. McCourt also authored 'Tis (1999), which continues the narrative of his life, picking up from the end of Angela's Ashes and focusing on his life after he returned to New York. He subsequently wrote Teacher Man (2005), which details his teaching experiences.

Many Limerick natives, including Gerry Hannan and Richard Harris, accused McCourt of greatly exaggerating his family's impoverished upbringing and hammering his mother. McCourt's own mother denied the accuracy of his stories shortly before her death in 1981, shouting from the audience during a stage performance of his recollections that it was "all a pack of lies." When McCourt travelled to Limerick to accept an honorary doctorate of letters from the University of Limerick, those living in the city had mixed feelings about his book, or what they had heard about it if they had not read the book. McCourt was defended by Limerick socialist TD Jim Kemmy, who described Angela's Ashes as "the best book ever written about working class life in Limerick". Many of his Stuyvesant High School students remembered quite clearly the mordant childhood anecdotes he continually told during sessions of his junior-level Creative Writing (E7W-E8W) elective. Reviewers in the US had high praise for his first memoir, including the literary critic for The New York Times.

McCourt wrote the book for the 1997 musical The Irish… and How They Got That Way, which featured an eclectic mix of Irish music from the traditional "Danny Boy" to U2's "I Still Haven't Found What I'm Looking For."

== Recognition ==
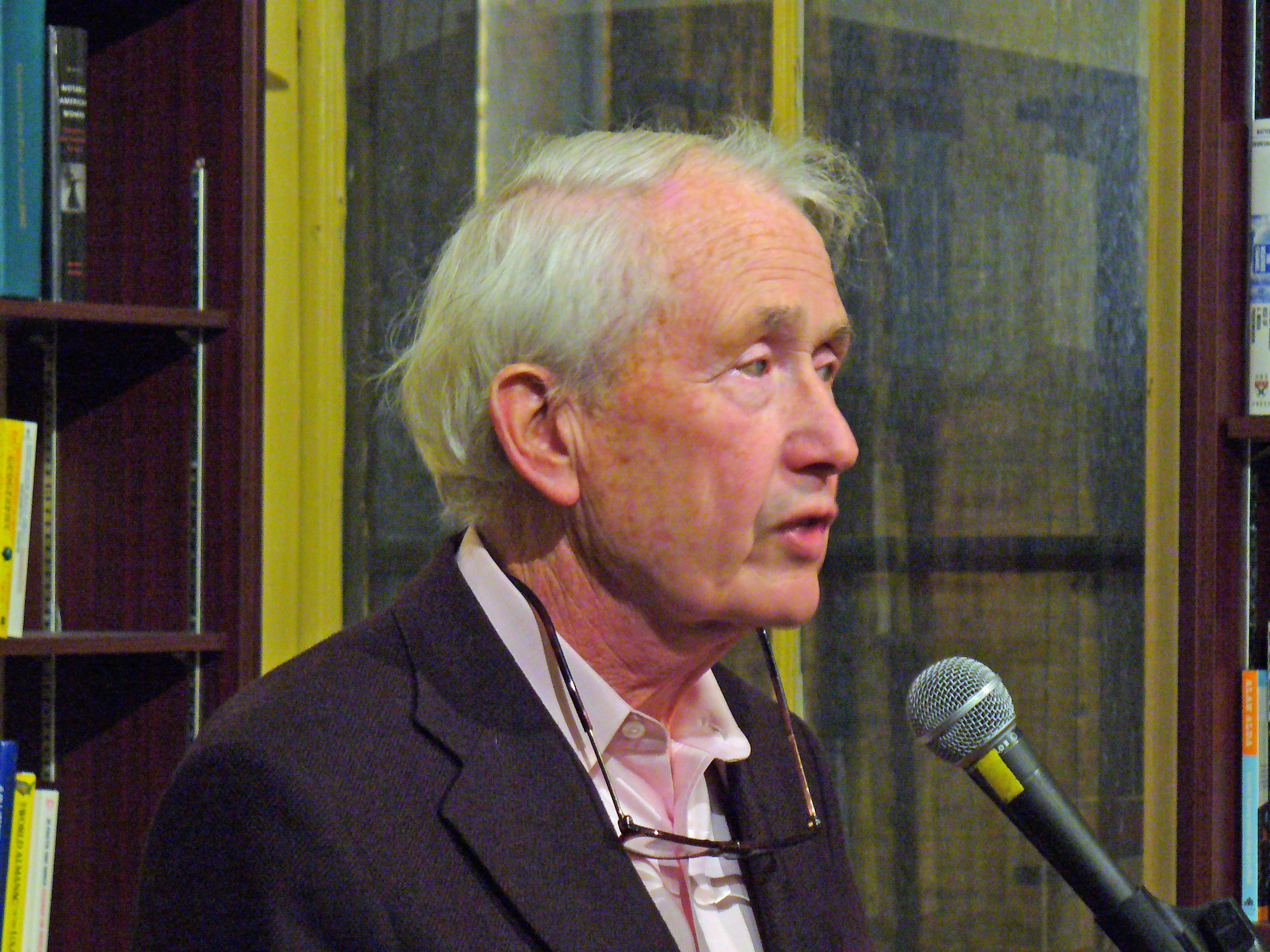
McCourt at New York's Housing Works bookstore paying tribute to Irish poet Benedict Kiely, 2007

McCourt was a member of the National Arts Club and was a recipient of the Award of Excellerhe Irish American of the Year by Irish America magazine. In 1999, McCourt received the Golden Plate Award of the American Academy of Achievement. In 2002 he was awarded an honorary degree from the University of Western Ontario.

In October 2009, the New York City Department of Education, along with several partners from the community, founded the Frank McCourt High School of Writing, Journalism, and Literature, a screened-admissions public high school. The school is located on the Upper West Side of Manhattan on West 84th Street. The Frank McCourt School is one of four small schools designated to fill the campus of the former Louis D. Brandeis High School. The Frank McCourt High School began classes September 2010.

The Frank McCourt Museum officially opened by Malachy McCourt in July 2011 at Leamy House, Hartstonge Street, Limerick. This Tudor-style building was formerly known as the Leamy School, the former school of Frank and his brother Malachy. The museum showcased the 1930s classroom of Leamy School and contained a collection of memorabilia, including items such as school books of the period and old photos, all donated by former pupils of the school. As well as having a large selection of Angela's Ashes memorabilia, the museum had recreated the McCourt home as described in the book using period pieces and props from the Angela's Ashes motion picture. The downstairs of the museum housed the Dr. Frank McCourt Creative Writing centre. The museum closed in October 2019. In 1999 a group of Limerick musicians (Burning Embers) released an album of 10 songs called 'Songs from the Ashes' inspired by Frank's book Angela's Ashes.

== Personal life ==
External videos
- Democracy Now! interview with Malachy McCourt about Frank McCourt's life and work, July 21, 2009

McCourt was married first in August 1961 to Alberta Small, whom he met at NYU and with whom he had a daughter, Margaret. They divorced in 1979. He married a second time in November 1984 to the psychotherapist Cheryl Floyd, and they divorced in 1989.

He married his third wife, Ellen Frey McCourt, on August 13, 1994, in Milford, Pennsylvania, five years after meeting at the Lion's Head bar in New York City. After the success of his memoir, they lived in New York City and Roxbury, Connecticut. He met Ellen in December 1989, when she was 35 and he was 59, retired from teaching high school. His brother Malachy described the first two marriages as difficult, and praised his brother's third wife Ellen as a woman who cherished his brother Frank, helping him to open up his creative side and write his books. Friends described wife Ellen as one to encourage his writing; he started writing Angela's Ashes after they married and finished it 13 months later. After the unexpected critical and financial success of his first memoir, McCourt and his wife settled in two homes, "their two-bedroom apartment on the Upper West Side of Manhattan, across the street from the Museum of Natural History. Then there's a converted barn that sits on 25 wooded acres in Roxbury, Conn."

== Death ==
It was announced in May 2009 that McCourt had been treated for melanoma and that he was in remission, undergoing home chemotherapy. On July 19, 2009, he died from the cancer, with meningeal complications, at a hospice in Manhattan, a month before his 79th birthday.

His mother, Angela Sheehan McCourt, and father, Malachy Gerald McCourt, predeceased him, in 1981 and 1985, respectively. He was survived by his brothers Malachy, Michael, and Alphie. His last surviving brother Malachy wrote a third memoir, Death Need Not Be Fatal, at age 85 with Brian McDonald, talking of his own life, missing his brother Frank, and life after 30 years of alcoholism had ended.

McCourt's ashes were shared among his brothers, his wife, and his daughter. On July 18, 2017, eight years after his death, his daughter Maggie spread her share of the ashes in Limerick, travelling there with her two sons, Jack and Avery, and his widow Ellen McCourt. They scattered them in two places: at the ruins of Carrigogunnell Castle which overlooks the River Shannon at Clarina, a place where he rode a bicycle as a boy, dreaming of going to America; and at Mungret Abbey, where members of her Sheehan family are buried, which he mentioned to his daughter, but then said to her that it would be too much trouble to do that. Maggie did it anyway. The portion with his brothers are in an urn buried where the playwright Arthur Miller is buried, at Great Oak Cemetery, Roxbury, Connecticut.

While his family was in Limerick, Angela’s Ashes – The Musical opened in the Bord Gáis Energy Theatre in Dublin on Thursday night, after a sell-out run in Limerick. The Frank McCourt Museum opened in the former Leamy's School, Limerick, curated by Úna Heaton. The Frank McCourt Museum closed in October 2019, after 10 years in operation. McCourt's papers are at Glucksman Library in the University of Limerick. Items in the museum were auctioned in 2020, and are now on display at the People's Museum in Limerick.

== Bibliography ==
=== Memoirs ===
- Angela's Ashes. Scribner. 1996
- 'Tis. Scribner. 1999
- Teacher Man. Scribner. 2005.

=== Play ===
- A Couple of Blaguards. Samuel French. 2011. ISBN 978-0573699634. (Co-written with McCourt's brother Malachy McCourt)

=== Children's books ===
- Angela and the Baby Jesus (Adult ed.). Scribner. 2007. ISBN 978-1416574705. (Illustrations by Loren Long)
- Angela and the Baby Jesus (Children's ed.). Simon & Schuster. 2007. ISBN 978-0545127820. (Illustrations by Raul Colon)

=== As editor ===
- Yeats is Dead!: A Novel by Fifteen Irish Writers. Knopf. 2001. ISBN 978-0-09-942234-1. (Edited with Roddy Doyle and Joseph O'Connor)
