= Terry Golway =

American writer and historian

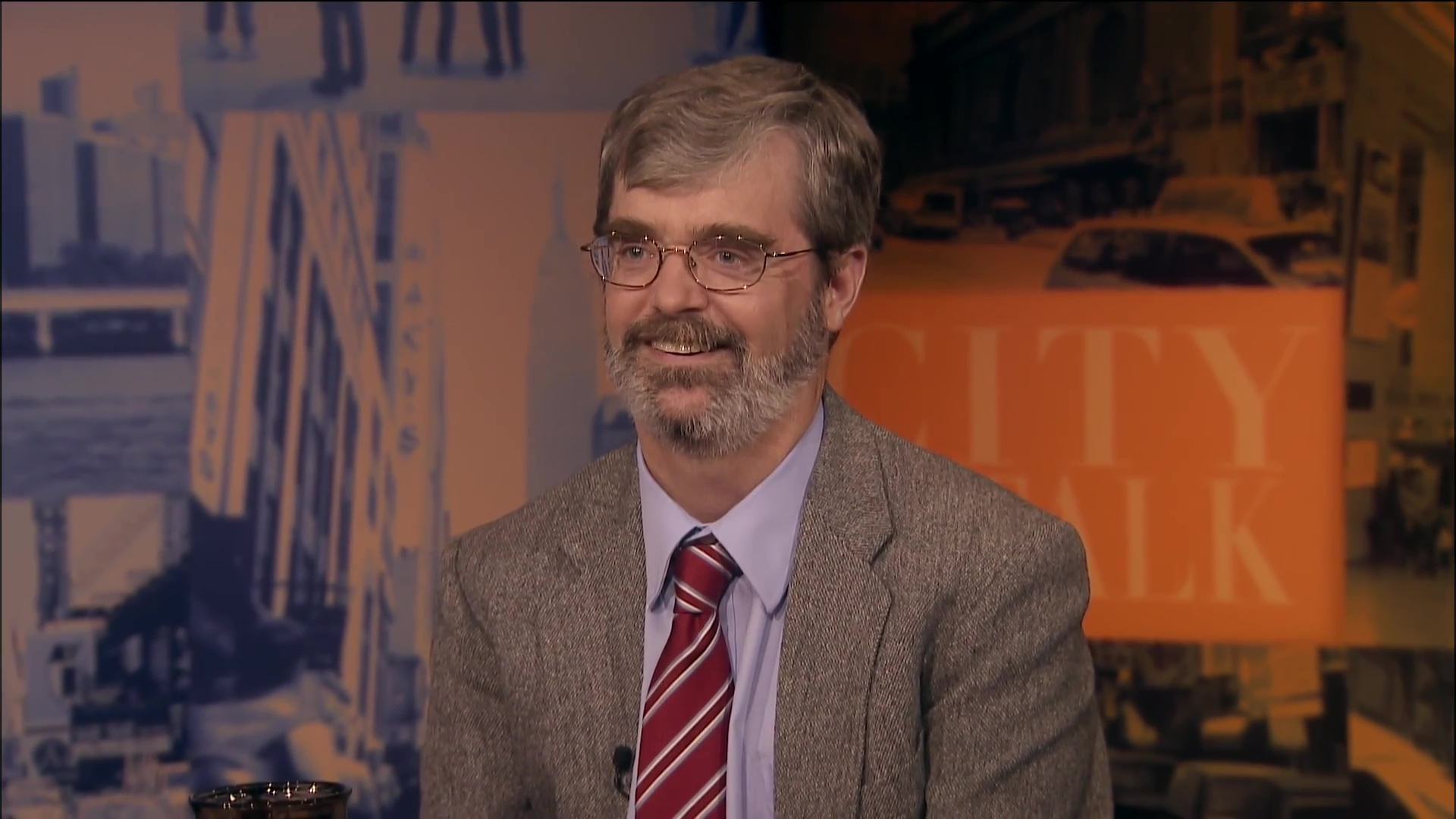
- Golway on CUNY TV's City Talk, 2014
- Occupation: Writer,
- Writing career
- Genres: Non-fiction, journalism, history, politics

Terry Golway is an American historian, author, and a journalist, having served as a columnist and editorial board member for The New York Times and a long-time editor and writer at The New York Observer.

== Career ==
In 2010, Golway discovered a historic early census count predating the creation of the United States at Liberty Hall National Historic Landmark at Kean. He is the author of several books on American and Irish history.

Golway's book on John F. Kennedy, JFK: Day by Day, was made into an iPad app to celebrate the 50th anniversary of Kennedy's inauguration.

Golway is an occasional op-ed columnist for The New York Times, where he was once a member of the editorial board. Previously, he spent two decades at The New York Observer. As of March 2013 he still writes periodic pieces for the “pink paper of lore” (The New York Observer); he served as a political reporter, city editor and columnist for that paper in earlier years.

== Bibliography ==
=== Non-fiction ===
- Irish Rebel: John Devoy and America's Fight for Ireland's Freedom (February 1988)
- For the Cause of Liberty: A Thousand Years of Ireland's Heroes (March 2000)
- Full of Grace: An Oral Biography of John Cardinal O'Connor (October 2001)
- So Others Might Live: A History of New York's Bravest (September 2002)
- No Greater Sacrifice, No Greater Love: A Son's Journey to Normandy (co-authored with Walter Ford Carter, April 2004)
- Washington's General: Nathanael Greene and the Triumph of the American Revolution (November 2004)
- Ronald Reagan's America: His Voice, His Dreams, and His Vision of Tomorrow (October 2008)
- Words that Ring Through Time: The Fifty Most Important Speeches in History and How they Changed Our World (January 2009)
- Together We Cannot Fail: FDR and the American Presidency in Years of Crisis (October 2009)
- JFK: Day by Day: A Chronicle of the 1,036 Days of John F. Kennedy's Presidency (October 2010)
- Give 'Em Hell: The Tumultuous Years of Harry Truman's Presidency, in His Own Words (May 2011)
- Machine Made: Tammany Hall and the Creation of Modern American Politics (March 2014)
- Frank and Al: FDR, Al Smith, and the Unlikely Alliance That Created the Modern Democratic Party (September 2018)
- Being New York, Being Irish: Reflections on Twenty-Five Years of Irish America and New York University's Glucksman Ireland House (November 2018)
- I Never Did Like Politics: How Fiorello La Guardia Became America's Mayor, and Why He Still Matters (February 2024)

=== Fiction ===
- Terror from America: A Sherlock Holmes Adventure (2026)
