= Mary Karr =

American poet and essayist

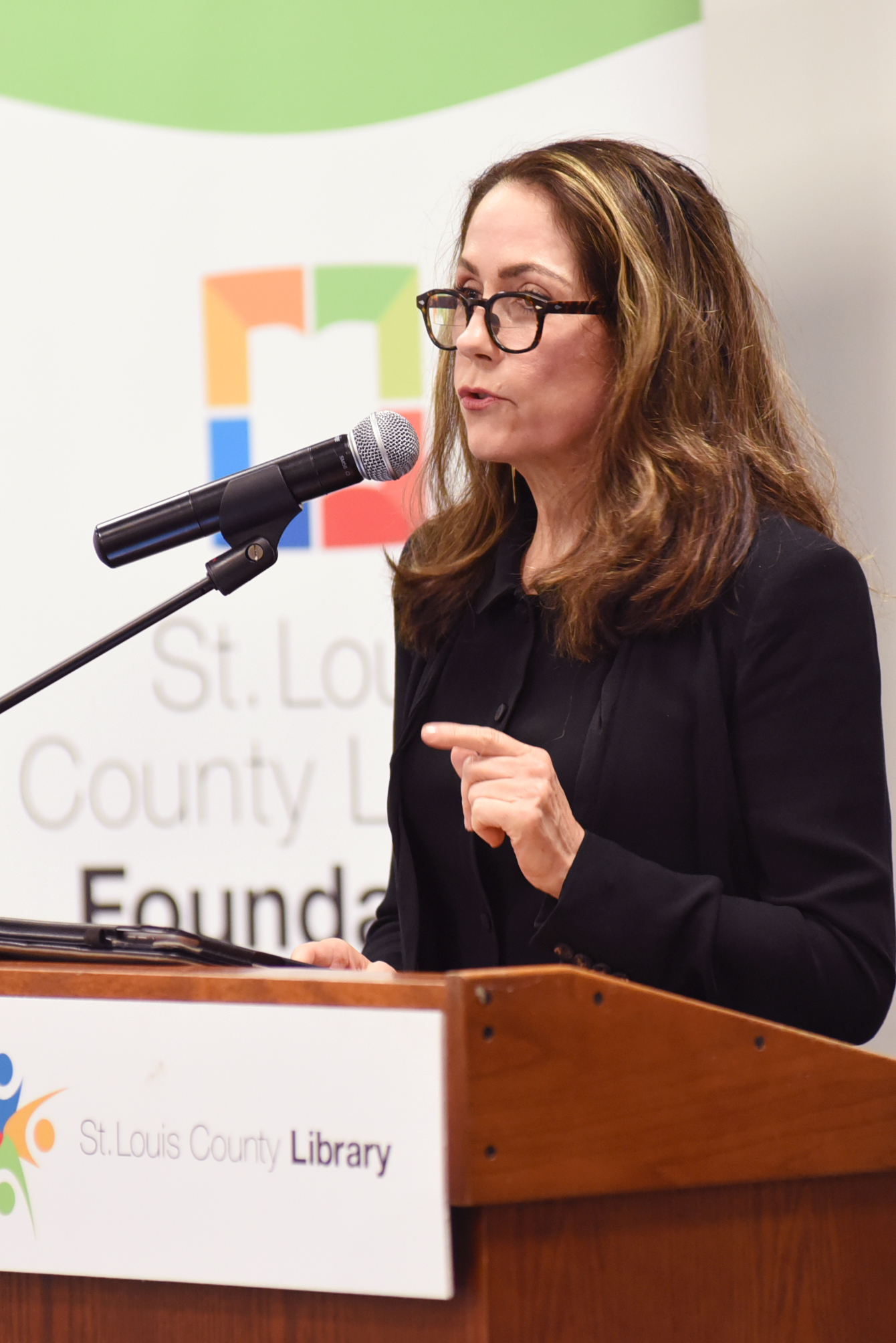
- Karr speaking at the St. Louis County Library on September 8, 2016
- Born: January 16, 1955 (age 71); Groves, Texas
- Occupations: Poet; Essayist; Memoirist
- Years active: 1987–present
- Notable work: The Liars' Club
- Website: www.marykarr.com

Mary Karr (born January 16, 1955) is an American poet, essayist and memoirist from East Texas. She is widely noted for her 1995 bestselling memoir The Liars' Club. Karr is the Jesse Truesdell Peck Professor of English Literature at Syracuse University.

== Early life and education ==
Karr was born in Groves, Texas, on January 16, 1955, and lived there until moving to Los Angeles in 1972. Her parents, Charlie Marie Moore and Pete Karr, were alcoholics, and she often abused drugs growing up. Karr attended Macalester College in St. Paul, Minnesota, for two years and met poet Etheridge Knight, one of her mentors, there. After a respite from school to participate in the anti-apartheid movement, Karr attended Goddard College and graduated with a terminal degree in fine arts.

== Career ==
=== Memoirs ===
Karr's memoir The Liars' Club, published in 1995, was a New York Times bestseller for more than a year and named one of the year's best books. It explores her deeply troubled childhood, most of which was spent in a gritty industrial section of Southeast Texas in the 1960s. Karr's friend Tobias Wolff encouraged her to write her personal history, but she has said she took up the project only when her marriage fell apart. She followed the book with a second memoir, Cherry (2000), about her late adolescence and early womanhood.

Karr's third memoir, Lit: A Memoir, which she says details "my journey from blackbelt sinner and lifelong agnostic to unlikely Catholic", came out in 2009. The memoir describes Karr's time as an alcoholic and the salvation she found in her conversion to Catholicism. She calls herself a cafeteria Catholic.

=== Poetry ===
Karr won a 1989 Whiting Award for her poetry. She was a Guggenheim Fellow in poetry in 2005 and has won Pushcart prizes for both her poetry and essays. Karr has published five volumes of poetry: Abacus (Wesleyan University Press, CT, 1987, in its New Poets series), The Devil's Tour (New Directions NY, 1993, an original TPB), Viper Rum (New Directions NY, 1998, an original TPB), Sinners Welcome (HarperCollins, NY, 2006), and Tropic of Squalor (HarperCollins, NY, 2018). Her poems have appeared in major literary magazines such as Poetry, The New Yorker, and The Atlantic Monthly.

Karr's Pushcart Award-winning essay, "Against Decoration", was originally published in the quarterly review Parnassus (1991) and later reprinted in Viper Rum. In "Against Decoration", Karr takes a stand in favor of content over style. She argues that emotions must be directly expressed and that clarity should be a watchword: characters are too obscure, the presented physical world is often "foggy" (imprecise), references are "showy" (both non-germane and overused), metaphors overshadow expected meaning, and techniques of language (polysyllables, archaic words, intricate syntax, "yards of adjectives") only "slow a reader's understanding".

Another essay, "Facing Altars: Poetry and Prayer", was originally published in Poetry (2005). In it, Karr writes about moving from agnostic alcoholic to baptized Catholic of the decidedly "cafeteria" kind, yet one who prays twice daily with loud fervor from her "foxhole". She argues that poetry and prayer arise from the same sources within us.

=== Other ===
In 2015, Karr was the speaker at Syracuse University's 161st commencement. She appears in the 2024 documentary series Martin Scorsese Presents: The Saints alongside Martin Scorsese, Paul Elie, and Father James Martin to discuss the lives of various Christian saints.

== Personal life ==
Karr was married to poet Michael Milburn for 13 years. Some time after their divorce, she began dating author David Foster Wallace, whose alleged abusive behavior toward Karr—which included throwing a coffee table at her and harassing her five-year-old son—is documented in a 2012 biography of Wallace.

Although she has converted to Catholicism, Karr has some views at odds with those of the Catholic Church, such as supporting abortion rights, and has advocated for women's ordination to the priesthood. She has described herself as a feminist since the age of 12.

== Awards and honors ==
- 1989 Whiting Award
- 1995 PEN/Martha Albrand Award for The Liars' Club
- 2004 Guggenheim Fellowship

== Works ==
Memoirs

- Grandma Moore's Cancer, Granta; Granta 44 (1993) ISBN 014-014063-8
- The Liars' Club, Viking Adult; (1995) ISBN 0-670-85053-5
- Cherry: A Memoir, Penguin Books; Reissue edition (2001) ISBN 0-14-100207-7
- Lit: A Memoir, HarperCollins; (2009) ISBN 0-060-596996

Poetry

- Abacus, Wesleyan (1987)
- The Devil's Tour, New Directions (1993) ISBN 0-8112-1231-9
- Viper Rum, Penguin (2001) ISBN 0-14-200018-3
- Sinners Welcome, HarperCollins (2006) ISBN 0-06-077654-4
- Tropic of Squalor, HarperCollins (2018) ISBN 0-06-2699822

Stories

- "Learner's Permit" (excerpt from Cherry). Nerve, w/o date.

Non-Fiction

- The Art of Memoir, Harper; (2015) ISBN 0-062-22306-2
