= Malachy McCourt =

American actor, writer and politician (1931–2024)

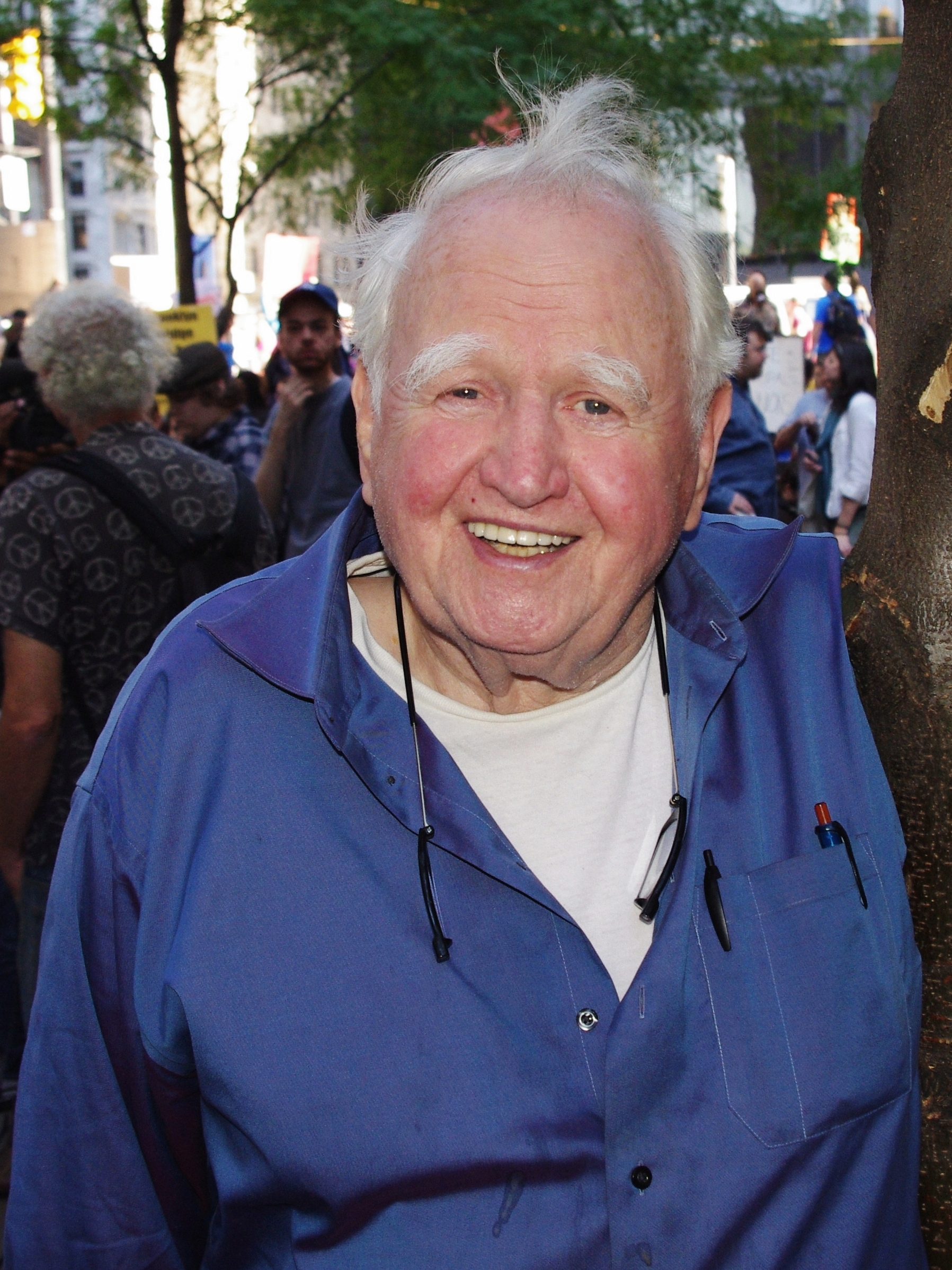
- McCourt in 2011
- Born: Malachy Gerard McCourt; September 20, 1931; New York City, New York, U.S.
- Died: March 11, 2024 (aged 92); New York City, New York, U.S.
- Citizenship: United States; Ireland
- Occupations: Actor; writer
- Political party: Green
- Spouses: Linda Wachsman (m. 1958; div. 1961); Diana Galin (m. 1965)
- Children: 4
- Relatives: Frank McCourt (brother); Alphie McCourt (brother)

Malachy Gerard McCourt (September 20, 1931 – March 11, 2024) was an American-Irish actor, writer and politician. Born in Brooklyn and raised in Limerick, McCourt appeared in several films and soap operas, including The Molly Maguires, Brewster's Millions (1985), and Another World. He also wrote three memoirs, describing his life in Ireland and in the United States. McCourt was the 2006 Green Party candidate for governor of New York, losing to the Democratic candidate Eliot Spitzer. He was the younger brother of author Frank McCourt.

== Early life ==
Malachy Gerard McCourt was born in Brooklyn on September 20, 1931, the son of Irish parents Angela (née Sheehan) and Malachy Gerard McCourt Sr. By the time of his death in 2024, he was the longest-lived of their seven offspring, following the death of his younger brother Alphonsus in 2016. McCourt was raised in Limerick, Ireland, and returned to the United States in 1952.

== Career ==
McCourt acted on stage, on television and in several movies, including The Molly Maguires (1970), The Brink's Job (1978), Q (1982), Brewster's Millions (1985), Tales from the Darkside (1985), The January Man (1989), Beyond the Pale (2000), Ash Wednesday (2002) and Gods and Generals (2003). He appeared on several New York City-based soap operas: Another World, Ryan's Hope, Search for Tomorrow, and One Life to Live. He is also known for his annual Christmas-time appearances on All My Children as Father Clarence, a priest who shows up to give inspirational advice to Pine Valley citizens.

In 1970, McCourt released a spoken word album on vinyl, And the Children Toll the Passing of the Day, which was produced by David Hess.

In the 1970s, he hosted a talk show on WMCA.

McCourt occasionally appeared on various programs on New York City's political radio station, WBAI, as late as 2023. Among the shows on which he appeared were Radio Free Éireann. He was also a regular guest artist at Scranton Public Theatre in Scranton, Pennsylvania, having performed in Inherit the Wind, Love Letters, and A Couple of Blaguards, which he co-wrote with brother Frank McCourt. He hosted a Sunday morning call-in radio forum on WBAI. He also had a short-lived role as a Catholic priest on the HBO prison drama Oz. McCourt played Francis Preston Blair in Gods and Generals (2003).

McCourt was the owner of Malachy's, a bar on Third Avenue in New York City. One of his frequent patrons was his friend the actor Richard Harris, who worked for a short time behind the bar for McCourt.

=== Writing ===
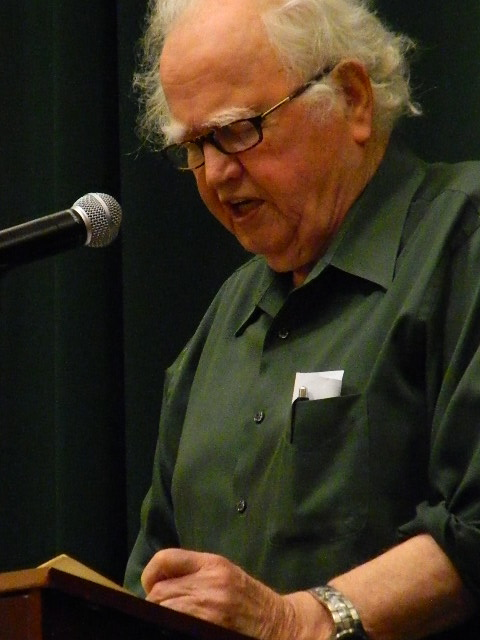
McCourt visiting Barnes & Noble Tribeca's yearly tribute to James Joyce

McCourt wrote three memoirs, A Monk Swimming, Death Need Not be Fatal, and Singing My Him Song, all of which detail respectively his life in Ireland and his later return to the United States. He also authored a book on the history of the ballad "Danny Boy", and put together a collection of Irish writings, called Voices of Ireland.

=== Politics ===
In April 2006, McCourt announced that he would seek to become governor of New York in the November 2006 election as a Green Party candidate. Running under the slogan "Don't waste your vote, give it to me", McCourt promised to recall the New York National Guard from Iraq, to make public education free through college, and to institute a statewide comprehensive "sickness care" system. McCourt polled at 5% in an October 10 Zogby poll, versus 25% for Republican John Faso and 63% for Democrat Eliot Spitzer. McCourt was endorsed by Cindy Sheehan, mother of a fallen soldier in the Iraq War. The League of Women Voters excluded him from the gubernatorial debate because he had less than 10% of support in a public opinion poll. He placed third in the general election, receiving 40,000 votes, or nearly 1%, losing to Democrat Eliot Spitzer.

== Personal life ==
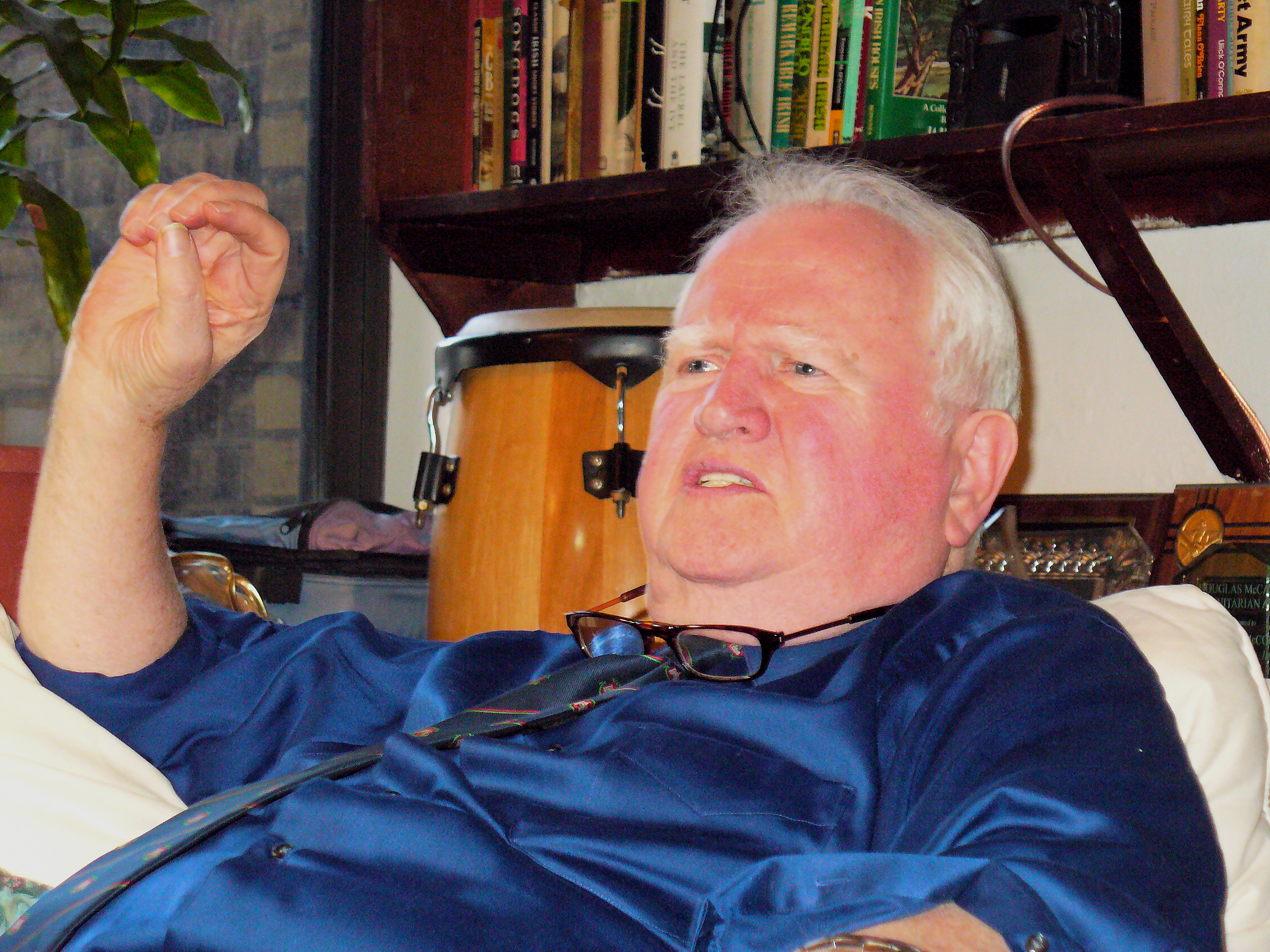
McCourt at his home in 2007

McCourt married Linda Wachsman, and had two children with her: daughter Siobhán and son Malachy III; he had two more children by his second wife, Diana Galin: sons Conor and Cormac. He also has a stepdaughter, Nina Galin.

In 1960, he was one of the four founding members of the Manhattan Rugby Football Club. Malachy appears in his older brother Frank McCourt's memoirs. He was portrayed by Peter Halpin in the film version of his brother's memoir Angela's Ashes.

In 2023, McCourt told The New York Times that he was ill with a number of health problems, including a heart condition, skin cancer, prostate cancer and a form of muscular degeneration. He died at Lenox Hill Hospital on March 11, 2024, aged 92.

== Books ==
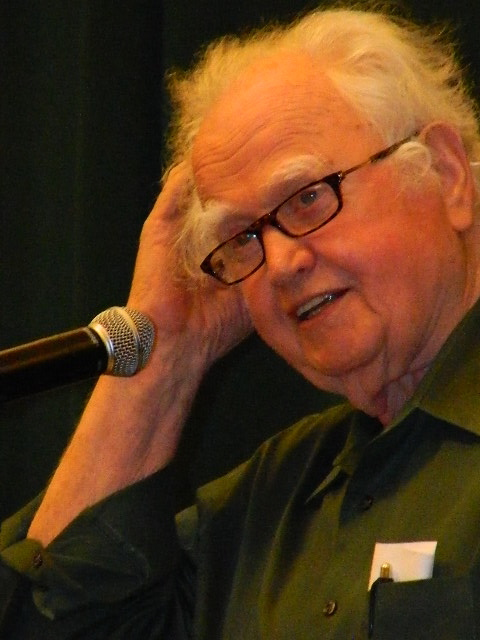
McCourt reading James Joyce to an audience at Barnes & Noble in Tribeca

- Death Need Not Be Fatal with Brian McDonald (2017), Center Street, ISBN 9781478917052, OL 34896470M
- "I Am Not Myself at All"—essay in The Face in the Mirror: Writers Reflect on Their Dreams of Youth and the Reality of Age (2009), Victoria Zackheim, editor; Prometheus Books, ISBN 978-1-59102-752-2
- Bush Lies in State (2004), Sensei Publications, ISBN 0-9755746-0-4
- Harold Be Thy Name: Lighthearted Daily Reflections for People in Recovery (2004), Carhil Ventures, ISBN 978-1-56649-296-6
- History of Ireland (2004), Running Press, ISBN 978-0-7624-3181-6
- The Claddagh Ring: Ireland's Cherished Symbol Of Friendship, Loyalty And Love (2003), Running Press, ISBN 0-7624-2014-6
- Danny Boy: The Legend of the Beloved Irish Ballad (2003), New American Library, ISBN 0-451-20806-4
- Voices of Ireland: Classic Writings of a Rich and Rare Land (2002), Running Press, ISBN 0-7624-1701-3
- Singing My Him Song (2000), HarperCollins, ISBN 978-0-06-019593-9
- A Monk Swimming: A Memoir (1998), Hyperion, ISBN 0-7868-6398-6
- Through Irish Eyes: A Visual Companion to Angela McCourt's Ireland (1998), Smithmark Publishing, ISBN 978-0-7651-0887-6

Party political offices
| Preceded by Stanley Aronowitz | Green Party Nominee for Governor of New York; 2006 | Succeeded by Howie Hawkins |
