= Liar's Club (band) =

Liar's Club is a pop band from the Seattle-Tacoma area. They released three self-produced CDs between 1989 and 1995. The group has since reorganized and has released a fourth album in March, 2013.

== History ==
Liar's Club was formed by members of the Tacoma-area cover band PG-13. Liar's Club started out as a trio: Jayson Jarmon (vocals, guitar, bass), Kevo X Thomson (bass, keyboards, vocals) and Brad McLane (drums). When McLane left the band, they recruited new guitarist Scott McPherson (vocals, guitar). At this point, Liar's Club played with a series of drummers including future Pearl Jam drummer Dave Krusen.

Liar's Club was unusual among Seattle and Tacoma bands in the late 1980s and early 1990s because they focused on melodic pop and intricate studio production, while grunge and punk music were popular in Seattle at that time. They achieved regional radio success and were often associated with the humorous advertising campaigns that accompanied their records.

Notable songs include "Espresso Girl" (which used the now-popular phrase "Thanks-a-latte...") which received solid commercial and college airplay in the Pacific Northwest. "Cinnamon Smiles" achieved a posthumous No. 1 spot in garageband.com's pop charts in 2002.

== Band members ==
=== Main lineup ===
- Jayson Jarmon — vocals, guitar, bass
- Scott McPherson — vocals, guitar
- Kevo X Thomson — bass, keyboards, vocals
- Dana Sims — drums
- Sean Gaffney — bass (1998 onward)

=== Previous drummers ===
- Brad McLane
- Dave Krusen
- John Rice
- Chris Kutz
- John Vangen
- Jeff Sadis
- Jarret Lofthus

== Discography ==
- Where Sinners Meet (1989 - Cassette only)
- Headful of Stars (1990)
- Evolution 9 (1992)
- Drop Dead. (1994)
- Come and Go (2013)
