= The Liars' Club =

1995 memoir by Mary Karr

- Author: Mary Karr
- Language: English
- Genre: Memoir
- Publisher: Viking Adult
- Publication date: 1995
- Publication place: United States
- Media type: Print (Hardcover & Paperback)
- Pages: 320 pp
- ISBN: 0-670-85053-5
- OCLC: 31374315
- Dewey Decimal: 818/.5403 B 20
- LC Class: PS3561.A6929 Z468 1995

The Liars' Club is a memoir by the American author Mary Karr. Published in 1995 by Viking Adult, the book tells the story of Karr's childhood in the 1960s in a small industrial town in Southeast Texas. The title refers to her father and his friends who would gather to drink and tell stories when they were not working at the local oil refinery or the chemical plant.

The book was a New York Times bestseller. In addition to winning the PEN/Martha Albrand Award, the memoir was a finalist for the National Book Critics Circle Award. In 2005, a 10-year anniversary edition was published with an added introduction from Karr. The Liars' Club is credited for launching a resurgence in the popularity of the memoir genre.

After the success of The Liars' Club, Karr followed up with two more memoirs: Cherry, which picks up at the end of The Liars' Club, was published in 2001, and Lit which was published in 2009.

== Plot ==
The book tells the story of Karr's troubled childhood in a small Texas town in the early 1960s. Using a non-linear story line, Karr describes the troubles of growing up in a family and town where heavy alcohol abuse and psychological problems are common issues. The memoir details her experience being raped and molested as a child, her mother's mental instability, and her witness to death and disparity.

The book is split into three sections, each corresponds to a different period of her life. The first section, called "Texas, 1961", details Karr's and her sister Lecia's upbringing in Southeast Texas. The narrative includes backgrounds on her mother Charlie and her father J.P., including how they met, and their previous relationships. Karr also writes about her maternal grandmother who, at 50 years old, died of cancer.

The second section of the book is called "Colorado, 1963". Karr explains that her family "moved to Colorado wholly by accident". While in Colorado, Karr's parents get divorced, and J.P. moves back to Texas, while Karr and her sister stay with Charlie. Her mother eventually meets Hector, who tries to make the girls call him "Daddy". After Charlie begins to drink again, Karr and Lecia become scared when one night their mother points a gun at and threatens Hector. Eventually, J.P. flies the girls back to Texas. Charlie and Hector travel to Texas too, and after J.P. punches Hector, Charlie leaves him, returning to her ex-husband for good.

The third section titled, "Texas Again, 1980", jumps ahead 17 years to a period when Karr is older and living in Boston. She returns to Texas after her father suffers a stroke. Karr helps Charlie care for J.P. While there, Karr reconnects with her mother and learns more about Charlie's mysterious past and previous mental health issues.

== Reviews ==
The Liars' Club received universal acclaim upon its publication in 1995. Sheila Ballantyne of The New York Times lauds the memoir's "haunting, often exquisite phrasing of states of being and qualities of mind that resonate long after a page is turned." Writing for The Washington Post, Jonathan Yardley noted that, "The Liars' Club is a tribute to and lament for a world its author no longer occupies. ... It is the essential American story."
