= Temple Bar =

Temple Bar may refer to:

- Temple Bar, London, a place in London marking the boundary of the Cities of London and Westminster
  - Temple Bar Gate, designed by Christopher Wren and since dismantled and moved to Paternoster Square.
  - Temple Bar Memorial, unveiled in 1880
- Temple Bar, Dublin, a cultural quarter in Dublin, Ireland
  - Temple Bar TradFest, a traditional Irish music and cultural festival at the location above
  - Temple Bar Gallery and Studios, at the location above
  - The Temple Bar (public house), a pub in the Temple Bar cultural quarter of Dublin
- Temple Bar, Lake Mead, a site on the Arizona side of Lake Mead
  - Temple Bar Marina, a marina on Lake Mead in the U.S. state of Arizona
  - Temple Bar Airport, airport at the location above
- Temple Bar, Ceredigion, a village in Ceredigion, Wales
- Temple Bar (magazine), a British literary magazine published 1860 to 1906
- Mory's or "Mory's Temple Bar", a private club in New Haven, Connecticut near the Yale campus
- Temple Bar, an album by John Waite
