= Owen Gleiberman =

American film critic (born 1959)

- Born: February 24, 1959 (age 67); Lausanne, Switzerland
- Education: University of Michigan
- Occupations: Film critic, writer, author
- Years active: 1981–present

Owen Gleiberman (born February 24, 1959) is an American film critic who has been chief film critic for Variety magazine since May 2016, a title he shares with Peter Debruge. Previously, Gleiberman wrote for Entertainment Weekly from 1990 until 2014. From 1981 to 1989, he wrote for The Phoenix.

== Early life and education ==
Gleiberman was born in Lausanne, Switzerland. He was raised in Ann Arbor, Michigan, and is a graduate of the University of Michigan.

== Career ==
Gleiberman's work has been published in Premiere and Film Comment. He reviews movies for NPR and NY1, and is a member of the New York Film Critics Circle.

Gleiberman is one of the critics featured in Gerald Peary's 2009 documentary film For the Love of Movies: The Story of American Film Criticism.

Gleiberman's autobiography, Movie Freak (2016), was published by Hachette Books.

== Personal life ==
Gleiberman and his wife Sharon live in New York City with their two daughters.
