= Anthony Fox =

Irish writer, producer, director and actor

- Born: County Cavan, Ireland
- Occupation(s): Actor, writer, director, producer
- Years active: 1992-

Anthony Fox is an Irish writer, producer, director, actor and founder of the New Theatre, Dublin. Originally from County Cavan, Fox left Ireland in 1992 to study acting at the Lee Strasberg Studio in London. From there he went to New York to work with the Irish Repertory Theatre, and had parts in A Wilde Night on Broadway and Juno and the Paycock.

Fox returned to Ireland in 1997, and set up the New Theatre in Dublin's Temple Bar. Fox later played the lead role in the Irish premiere of Tennessee Williams' Sweet Bird of Youth, as directed by Tim McDonnell, and in 2004 played the lead role in a production of Brendan Behan's The Hostage. His film and TV credits include The General and The Bill on ITV.

Fox wrote the 2008 film Anton, which was nominated in three categories of the 2009 Irish Film & Television Awards.
