= The Brooklyn Heist =

- DVD cover
- Directed by: Julian Mark Kheel
- Written by: Julian Mark Kheel; Brett Halsey
- Produced by: Brett Halsey; Michael Cecchi; Danny Masterson; Dave Steck
- Starring: Danny Masterson; Leon Robinson; Aysan Celik; Michael Cecchi; Serena Reeder; Jonathan Hova; Blanchard Ryan; Dominique Swain; Phyllis Somerville; MuMs da Schemer; Barney Cheng
- Cinematography: Carlo Scialla
- Edited by: Adrienne Stern
- Music by: David Poe
- Production companies: Capers Productions; Numeric Pictures
- Distributed by: Image Entertainment
- Release dates: November 1, 2008 (Ft. Lauderdale Film Festival); November 27, 2009 (United States)
- Running time: 86 minutes
- Country: United States
- Language: English

The Brooklyn Heist (also released as Capers), is a 2008 film written by Julian Mark Kheel and Brett Halsey and directed by Julian Mark Kheel.

== Cast ==
- Danny Masterson as Fitz
- Leon Robinson as Ronald
- Aysan Çelik as Lana
- Michael Cecchi as Dino
- Serena Reeder as Maya
- Jonathan Hova as Slava
- Blanchard Ryan as Samantha
- Dominique Swain as Mercy
- Phyllis Somerville as Connie
- MuMs da Schemer as Moose
- Barney Cheng as Bo
- Joe Rosario as Goon
