= Barney Cheng =

Taiwanese-American actor, director, writer and producer

- 鄭伯昱
- Born: February 1, 1971 (age 55); Taipei, Taiwan
- Education: Stanford University (BA); University of Oxford
- Occupations: Writer; director; actor
- Website: chengcinematic.com

Barney Cheng (traditional Chinese: 鄭伯昱; simplified Chinese: 郑伯昱; born February 1, 1971) is a Taiwanese-American actor, director, writer and producer.

== Early life and education ==
Cheng was born in Taipei, Taiwan. His family emigrated to the United States when he was 12 years old and he grew up in Brea, California. He speaks Mandarin Chinese and Taiwanese Hokkien fluently.

After graduating from Brea Olinda High School, Cheng attended Stanford University and received a Bachelor of Arts (B.A.) in political science in 1993. His focus was initially on a career in law, and he studied political philosophy at Oxford University for his junior year abroad in England. While at Oxford, he was attracted to the West End stage and spent nights and weekends in London.

== Career ==
In 1994, Cheng moved to New York City, where he studied at the Lee Strasberg Theatre Institute. He was featured in two Off-Broadway plays by playwright Prince Gomolvilas, Donut Holes in Orbit and Big Hunk o' Burnin' Love. He appeared in a variety of stage and television roles, including Shakespeare's Puck, Bill Clinton's political adviser on Saturday Night Live and George W. Bush's voice on Late Night with David Letterman.

After four movie appearances, Cheng co-starred opposite Woody Allen in Hollywood Ending. Cheng played Chou, a translator for a washed-up movie director, played by Allen. Although the movie received a mixed reception from critics, they loved Cheng's performance. The New York Times described Cheng's comedic timing as "surgically precise." The Orange County Register raved that Cheng "steals every scene he's in." Cheng accompanied Allen to promote the film and to open the 55th Cannes Film Festival.

In addition to acting, Cheng works as a director, writer and producer. His award-winning films have collectively screened in over 80 film festivals worldwide. Most recently, his film To Comfort You, starring Golden Globe Winner Susan Blakely and Pauley Perrette of NCIS, won Best Drama and Best Film at the 2010 Beverly Hills Shorts Festival.

Cheng directed Steps for Banana Republic and Vanity Fair as part of his Film Independent Project:Involve fellowship. Steps won international awards from Poland's KAN Film Festival, Ukraine's International Rights Film Festival, UK's Black Film Festival and Malta's Golden Knight Malta International Film Festival.

MTV Networks acquired Cheng's film The Red Dress for its 2009-2010 Logo programming. Prior to that, Cheng directed Mrs. C, a political satire starring Niecy Nash, to help the Obama campaign during the 2008 presidential primary. His first screenplay Dien's Playground advanced to the final stage of the Sundance Screenwriters Lab.

Cheng lives in West Hollywood, California, and delivers every Friday for Project Angel Food. He is openly gay.

== Filmography ==
Year	Title	Role	Notes
1999	Fall 1990	Jimmy	
2000	Frequency	Barney, the food delivery man	Uncredited
2001	Exceed	Associate	
2002	Rollerball	Sports Announcer	Uncredited
2002	Hollywood Ending	Translator	
2003	Wasabi Tuna	Harvey/Mr. Ling	
2004	Stay Until Tomorrow	Jim	
2006	Mission: Impossible III	Janitor	
2008	The Brooklyn Heist	Bo	
2015	Baby Steps (film)	Danny	Director & Writer
