= Patrick Clarke =

Irish actor and filmmaker

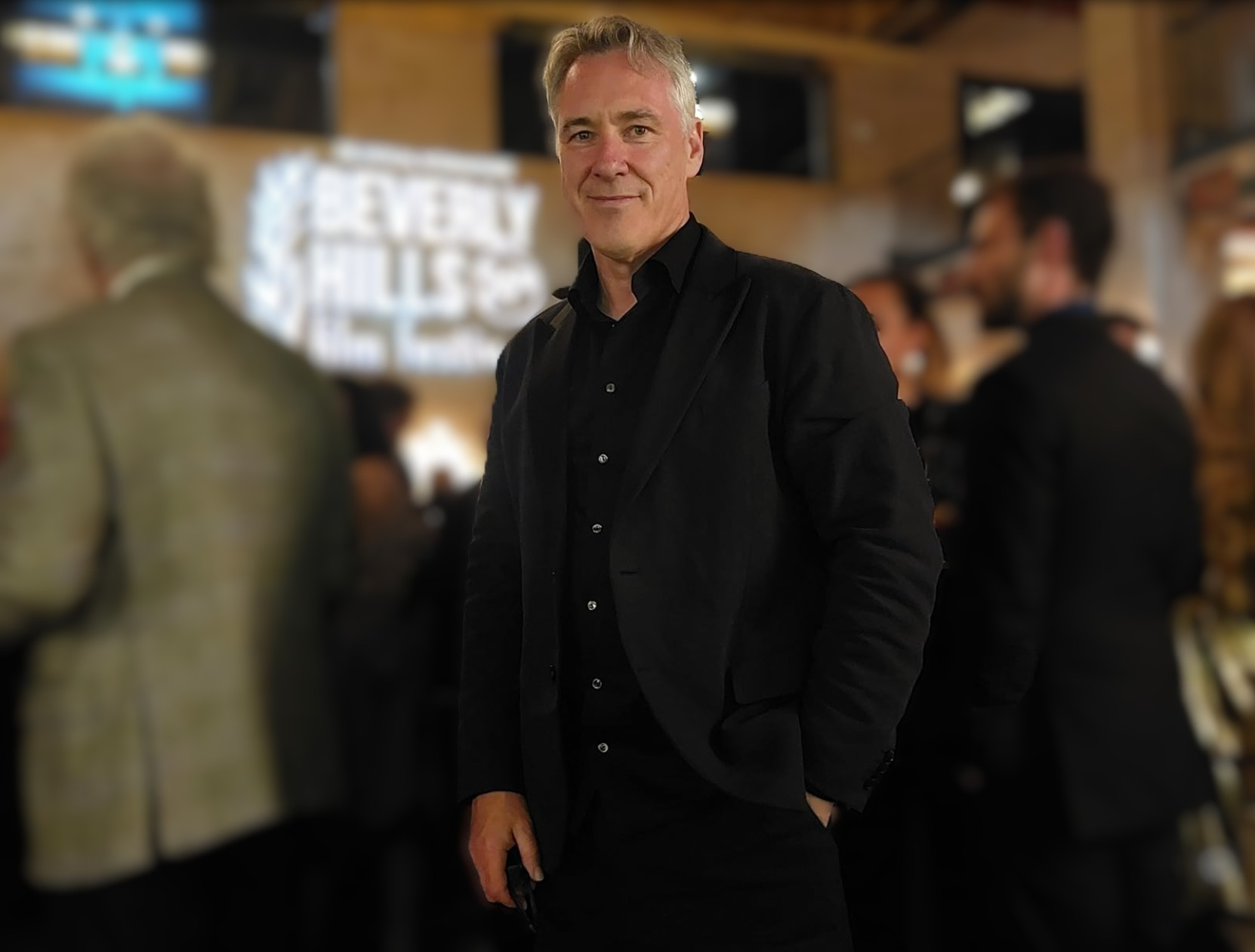
- Born: Dublin, Ireland
- Occupations: Actor, writer, producer
- Years active: 1994–present
- Spouse: Andrea Cullen (m. 2018)

Patrick Clarke is a writer, director, producer and actor. Clarke produced his first feature Beyond the Pale in 1999. Based on actual events, the immigrant drama won awards at the Houston and Arizona film festivals (2000). Clarke's performance in Beyond the Pale led to roles in The Magnificent Ambersons for A&E Networks and the award-winning black comedy Stay Until Tomorrow (2004), which was developed through the Sundance Institute.

In 2004, Clarke formed i4i Productions, projects included One (2008), written and performed by Greg Pearl, John Illsley and Paul Brady; the feature-length documentary The Extra Mile and the period feature thriller Trapped a.k.a. Anton which was nominated for three IFTA's at the 6th Irish Film & Television Awards. Clarke appeared in Aiyaary a Hindi action thriller directed by Neeraj Pandey, it was released worldwide on February 16, 2018 and produced and directed ‘The New Theatre’, a documentary about Dublin’s most inspirational Independent theatre venue (New Theatre, Dublin), released on Arts & Education platforms across the United States in February, 2019.

== Early life ==
Clarke was born in the Rotunda Hospital Dublin. He lived in Finglas, a suburb of the city of Dublin and attended Beneavin De La Salle College. He played Gaelic football for Erin's Isle GAA Club (Irish: Oileán na hÉireann) and soccer for Beggsboro A.F.C. an Irish association football club based in Cabra, Dublin. In 1986, at the age of 20, he moved to New York City.

== Filmography ==
=== Film ===
Year	Title	Role	Director	Producer	Screenwriter	Notes
1994	The Last Actor	Drake				Short Film
1994	Fall From Grace	Donovan				Short Film
1999	Harlem Aria	Security Guard				
1999	Beyond the Pale (film)	Patrick Shaw		Yes	Yes	
2002	The Magnificent Ambersons	Travis Bicle				
2004	Stay Until Tomorrow (Film)	Patrick				
2007	Shattered	Shane Franks				
2007	The Extra Mile	Himself	Yes	Yes	Yes	Documentary
2008	Anton	Barrister Macken		Yes		
2009	The Making of Anton	Himself	Yes	Yes	Yes	Documentary
2018	Aiyaary	Roger				
2018	Tonight with Roger Goodman	Roger Goodman				Short Film
2019	New Theatre, Dublin: Documentary		Yes	Yes	Yes	
2021	The Piano					Executive Producer
2023	Only Love Matters	David Davidson				
2024	Lock it Up	Dante		Yes		Short Film

=== Television ===
Year	Title	Role	Notes
1999	The Man the Myth the Viagra Sex and the City	Patron in Oak Room	1 Episode
2012	Alexander & Pete	Alexanders Dad	Pilot Episode
2020	Autopsy (TV series) The Last Hours of Jeffrey Epstein (2020)	Jeffrey Epstein	1 episodes
