= Alison Folland =

American actress and filmmaker

- Occupation: Actress
- Years active: 1995–2010

Alison Folland is an American actress and filmmaker.

Folland grew up in Wellesley, and attended high school at Buckingham Browne & Nichols, a private school in Cambridge. She was nominated in 1997 for the Independent Spirit Award for Best Female Lead in All Over Me and had supporting roles in films such as To Die For, Good Will Hunting and Boys Don't Cry.

== Filmography ==
- To Die For (1995) - Lydia Mertz
- Before and After (1996) - Martha Taverner
- All Over Me (1997) - Claude
- Good Will Hunting (1997) - M.I.T. Student
- Boys Don't Cry (1999) - Kate
- Pigeonholed (1999) - Eve
- Finding Forrester (2000) - Jeopardy Contestant
- Things Behind the Sun (2001) - Lulu
- Milwaukee, Minnesota (2003)- Tuey Stites
- The Ballad of Pinto Red (2004) - Pinto Pulaski
- She Hate Me (2004) - Doris
- Stay Until Tomorrow (2004) - Carla
- Zerophilia (2005) - Janine
- Diggers (2006) - Beth
- I'm Not There (2007) - Grace
- The Happening (2008) - Woman Reading on Bench with Hair Pin (opening scene)
- The Fighter (2010) - Laurie Carroll (Micky Ward's ex)

== Television ==
- Homicide: Life on the Street (1997) - Grace Rivera
- Law & Order (1998) - Gina Bowman
- CSI: NY (2006) - Stacey Gale
