= Richard Wall =

Irish film, television and theatre actor

- Born: 1976 or 1977 (age 48–49); Ballybunion, County Kerry, Ireland
- Occupation: Actor

Richard Wall (born 1976 or 1977 in Ballybunion, County Kerry) is an Irish film, television and theatre actor. He has had rules such as Robert Power in the TV series The House and as Sgt. Thornton in the 2008 film Anton.

After completing his studies in Creative Arts and Theatre at Lorenzo de' Medici School in Florence, Italy, he trained as an actor at Herbert Berghof Studio in New York. Wall also used this time to attain his Series 7 and 63 licences by completing the General Securities Representative Exam and Uniform Securities Agent State Law Exam. Before taking up acting as his chosen career, he spent a number of years working as a trader in a New York investment bank.

Wall was one of the main cast in the short film Whatever Turns You On, which won the Best Short Award at the Aspen Shortsfest in Colorado which made it eligible for consideration for the 82nd Academy Awards. The film also won Best Short Film at Florence International Film Festival Italy 2009, the award for Best Irish Short Film at the Kerry Film Festival 2008 and the Audience Award at Filmstock International Film Festival 2008 in Britain. In the same month it was short-listed for the award of Best Short Film at the Boston Irish Film Festival and received a theatrical release in Ireland and France. The short was also purchased by TV stations in Poland, Ireland, Belgium, France and by Channel 4 in the UK.

His television credits include the TG4 series Marú, the bilingual drama series Saor Sinn ó Olc' and also 6 Degrees which aired on BBC Television.

Wall was a project manager for the photographic exhibition, Faces of Ireland, which included a series of portraits of people of Ireland representing each of the island's 32 counties. Photographs in the exhibit included portraits of Graeme McDowell, Rory McIlroy, Pierce Brosnan, Sarah Bolger, Neil Jordan, Sinéad O'Connor, Mary McAleese, Gabriel Byrne, and Enda Kenny. As of October 2011, the exhibition was on display at Dublin Airport's Terminal 2.
