= Roger Davis (television actor) =

American actor and entrepreneur

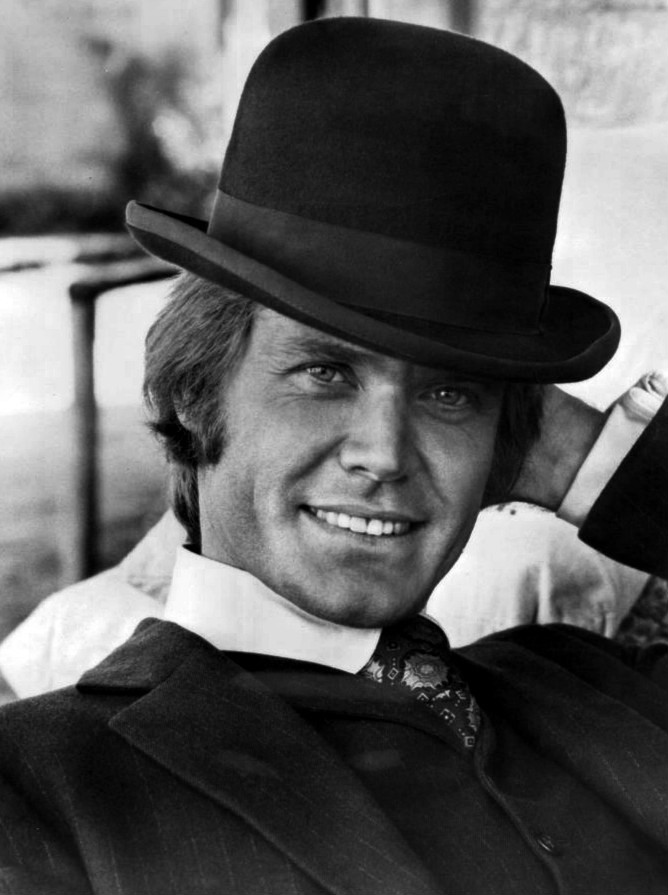
- Davis in 1972
- Born: Jon Roger Davis; April 5, 1939 (age 87); Louisville, Kentucky
- Education: Columbia College
- Occupations: Actor, real estate developer
- Years active: 1962–present
- Spouse(s): Jaclyn Smith (1968–1975); Suzanne Irwin (1979–1983); Alice LeGette (1985–1988); Donna Jenis (1991–1996)
- Children: 1

Jon Roger Davis (born April 5, 1939) is an American actor and entrepreneur. He starred in the television series Dark Shadows and Alias Smith and Jones. He has also appeared in "Spur of the Moment", a fifth season episode of The Twilight Zone.

== Education ==
Roger Davis was born in Louisville, Kentucky, on April 5, 1939, and graduated from Columbia College in 1961, where he was classmates with Dark Shadows co-star Don Briscoe and director Brian De Palma.

== Acting career ==
Davis first appeared on television in 1962. He portrayed Pvt. Roger Gibson in the television series The Gallant Men. In 1963, he co-starred with Richard Egan in the series Redigo. In 1964, Davis appeared in one fifth season episode of The Twilight Zone, "Spur of the Moment", co-starring Diana Hyland, and had a supporting role in the 1964 film Ride the Wild Surf. He guest-starred twice in the western TV series Bonanza, as Harold Stanley in the 1966 eighth season episode "Ballad of the Ponderosa" and Bert Yates in the 1971 12th season episode "Top Hand".

From 1968 to 1970, Davis garnered attention playing multiple characters on the daytime Gothic soap opera Dark Shadows. He played Peter Bradford, Jeff Clark, Ned Stuart, Dirk Wilkins, and Charles Delaware Tate.

In 1971, Davis narrated the voiceover theme sequence for the western series Alias Smith and Jones, starring Pete Duel as Hannibal Heyes/Joshua Smith and Ben Murphy as Jedediah "Kid" Curry/Thaddeus Jones. He also appeared in one of the episodes ("Smiler with a Gun") as slick gunfighter Danny Bilson. Bilson has the distinction of being the only character kind-hearted Kid Curry was ever driven to kill during the series.

When Pete Duel committed suicide at the end of 1971, Davis replaced him as Hannibal Heyes on Alias Smith and Jones. However, after Davis completed just 17 episodes, it was clear the show would not achieve the same level of popularity it had with Pete Duel. The series ended in 1973 when competition from the popular Flip Wilson Show siphoned the show's ratings.

Davis continued to act in guest-starring roles on TV series throughout the 1970s as well as the occasional film appearance in movies such as Killer Bees (1974), Flash and the Firecat (1975), Nashville Girl (1976), Ruby (1977), and Aspen (1977), and he has been a voiceover actor for thousands of TV and radio commercials. In 2000, he appeared in the film Beyond the Pale. Davis regularly attends fan conventions for both Alias Smith and Jones and Dark Shadows, and in 2011, he reprised his role of Charles Delaware Tate in both The Blind Painter and The Crimson Pearl, new audio plays of Dark Shadows. In 2019, Davis appeared as himself in the documentary movie Master of Dark Shadows, a direct-to-DVD release.

== Business career ==
Davis developed land and built homes in Southern California until 2010, and continues to design and renovate properties in the greater Los Angeles area as of 2022. He owns an interest in movie developer Lonetree Entertainment in Los Angeles. He also renovated the Seelbach Hotel in Louisville, Kentucky, and built a condominium building there, known as 1400 Willow. His family owned the Davis Tire Company in Louisville.

== Personal life ==
In 1968, Davis married actress Jaclyn Smith. After a brief separation, they divorced in January 1975. During his second marriage to Ohioan Suzanne Irwin (Emerson), Roger became a father to a daughter Margaret in 1981. The family resided at Spring Station, Louisville, Kentucky's oldest home, built in 1791. After a divorce in 1983, Davis was married to realtor Alice LeGette from 1985 to 1988. In 1991, Davis married Los Angeles attorney Donna Jenis; they divorced in 1996.
