= Amy Geller =

American documentary director and producer

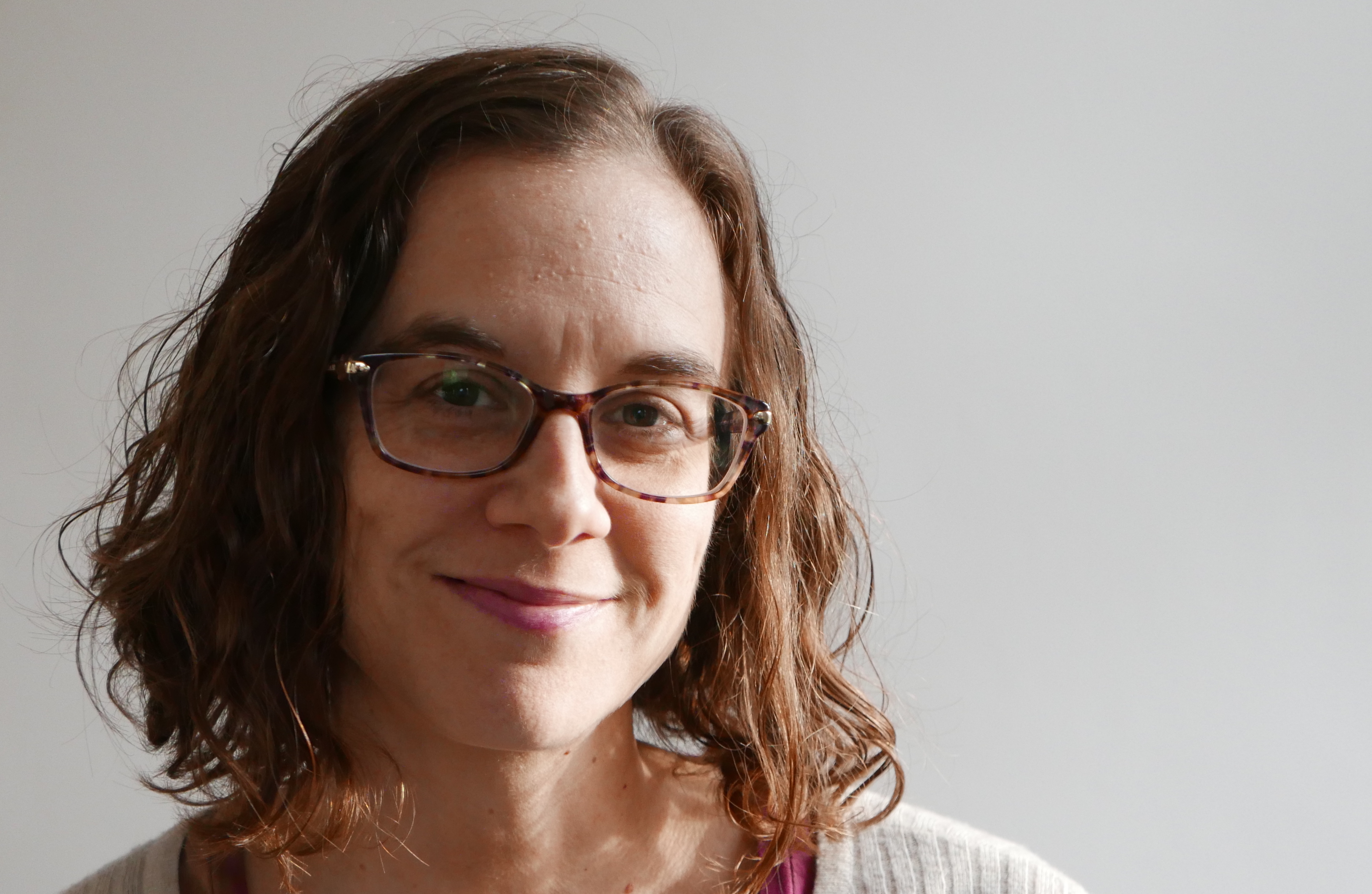
- Born: Hampton, New Hampshire, U.S.
- Occupations: Director; producer; professor
- Years active: 2003–present
- Spouse: Gerald Peary

Amy Geller is an American documentary film director and producer. She is best known for her work on the documentaries The Rabbi Goes West and The Guys Next Door.

== Life and career ==
Geller was born in Hampton, New Hampshire. She holds a B.A. from Bates College and an M.F.A. in Cinema and Media Production from Boston University. She has served as the artistic director of the Boston Jewish Film Festival and was President of Women in Film and Video New England. She is currently an Assistant Professor of Production at Boston University and has previously taught classes at Emerson College. She is also a member of Film Fatales, the Documentary Producers Alliance, and the IDA. In 2015, she received a Chai in the Hub Award for young Jewish leadership and, in 2016, a Boston University Women's Guild Scholarship.

Geller co-directed her debut feature documentary, The Guys Next Door, along with Allie Humenuk, which premiered at the Sarasota Film Festival in 2016 and was broadcast on the World Channel. In 2019, she co-directed a documentary, The Rabbi Goes West, along with Gerald Peary, about a Chabad Hasidic rabbi and his family who built a shul in their Montana home.

In 2024, Geller released her first narrative documentary podcast entitled "The Rabbis Go South." Produced, written and narrated by Geller and Peary, the seven-part series uncovers the true story of Jewish-Black solidarity in St. Augustine, Florida during the Civil Rights Movement. The podcast is a presentation of Hub & Spoke, an independent audio collective.

== Filmography ==
Year	Title	Contribution	Note
2019	The Rabbi Goes West	Co-director and producer	Documentary
2017	Over His Dead Body	Producer	Short film
2017	Borderline	Producer	Short film
2016	The Guys Next Door	Co-director and co-producer	Documentary
2015	Archie's Betty	Field producer	Documentary
2011	Love and Other Anxieties	Co-producer	Documentary
2009	For the Love of Movies: The Story of American Film Criticism	Producer and cinematographer	Documentary
2008	Traces of the Trade: A Story from the Deep North	Line producer	Documentary
2006	The War that Made America - Turning the Tide	Producer	Documentary mini-series
2004	Stay Until Tomorrow	Producer	Feature film
2003	American Experience - Murder at Harvard	Producer	Documentary series
2003	Act Your Age	Consulting producer	Short film

== Awards and nominations ==
Year	Result	Award	Category	Work	Ref.
2016	Won	Woods Hole Film Festival	Best Documentary Feature	The Guys Next Door	
2016	Won	Rhode Island International Film Festival	Alternative Spirit Award	The Guys Next Door	
2009	Won	Boston Society of Film Critics	Special Commendation	For the Love of Movies	
