= New Theatre, Dublin =

Theatre in Dublin, Ireland

The New Theatre
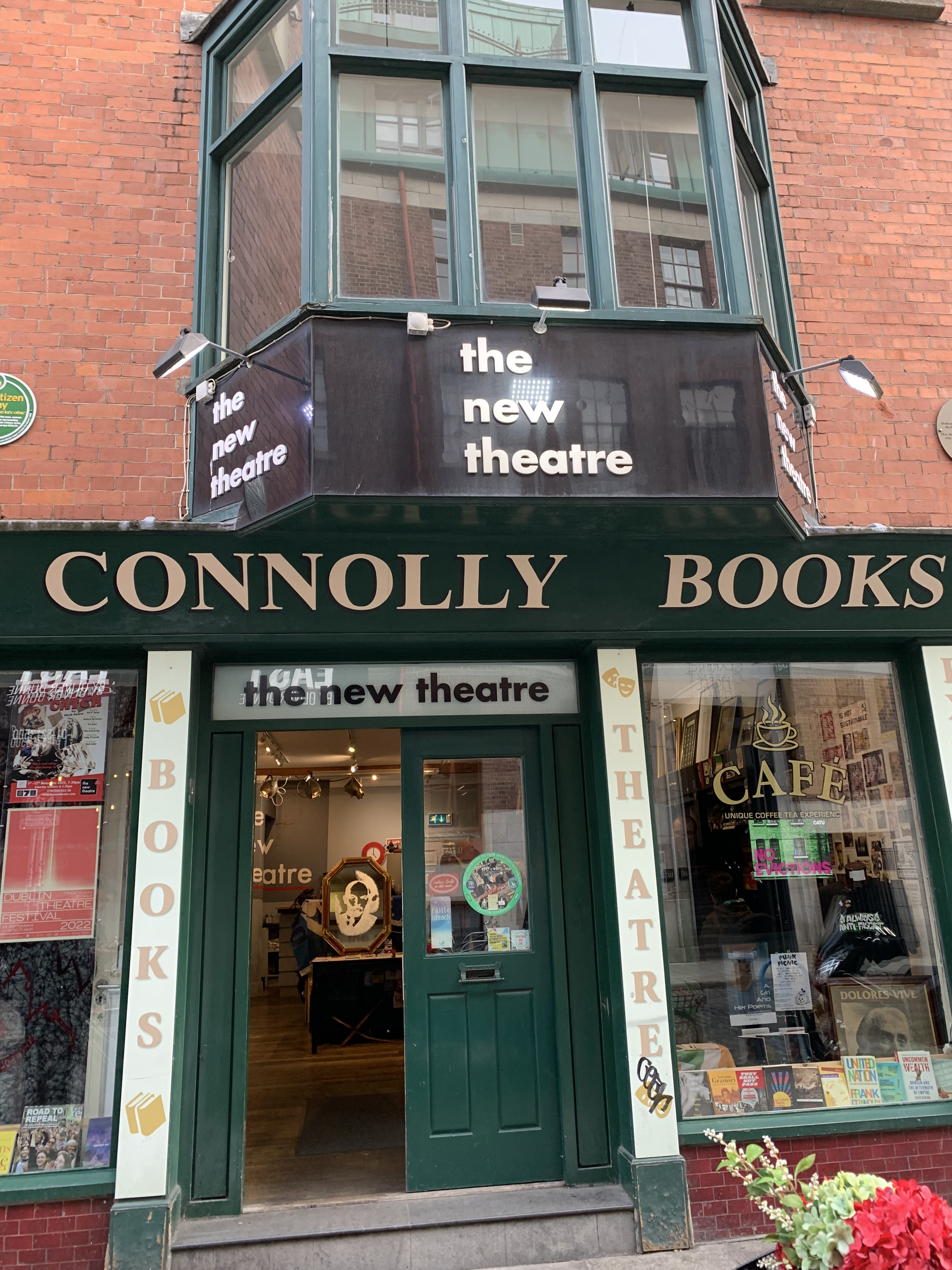

- Location within Central Dublin
- Address: 43 East Essex Street; Dublin 2 Republic of Ireland
- Coordinates: 53.3450°N 6.2665°W
- Capacity: 66
- Type: Proscenium

Construction
- Opened: 1997
- Rebuilt: 2007
- Years active: 20

Website
- thenewtheatre.com

The New Theatre is a small theatre, with 66 seats, in Temple Bar, Dublin. Founded in 1997, it was closed temporarily during 2007 for renovation works.

It is partly funded by the Arts Council and Dublin City Council, and managed by Anthony Fox.

The theatre hosts works as part of the Dublin Fringe Festival, Dublin Theatre Festival, Dublin Feminist Film Festival, and other events.

A documentary film, The New Theatre, directed by Patrick Clarke was released on Arts & Education platforms across the United States in February 2019.
