= The Rabbi Goes West =

2019 American documentary film

- Film poster
- Directed by: Amy Geller and Gerald Peary
- Release date: July 23, 2019 (San Francisco Jewish Film Festival)
- Country: United States
- Language: English

The Rabbi Goes West is a 2019 documentary film about a Chabad Hasidic rabbi and his family who move to Montana. The film's directors are Amy Geller and Gerald Peary. The film covers the lives of the Chabad rabbi's efforts to increase Jewish observance among the Jews living in the state, as well as reactions from the non-Orthodox rabbis living in Montana.

== See also ==
- The Frisco Kid
- Outback Rabbis
- Chabad in film and television
