= Beyond the Pale (film) =

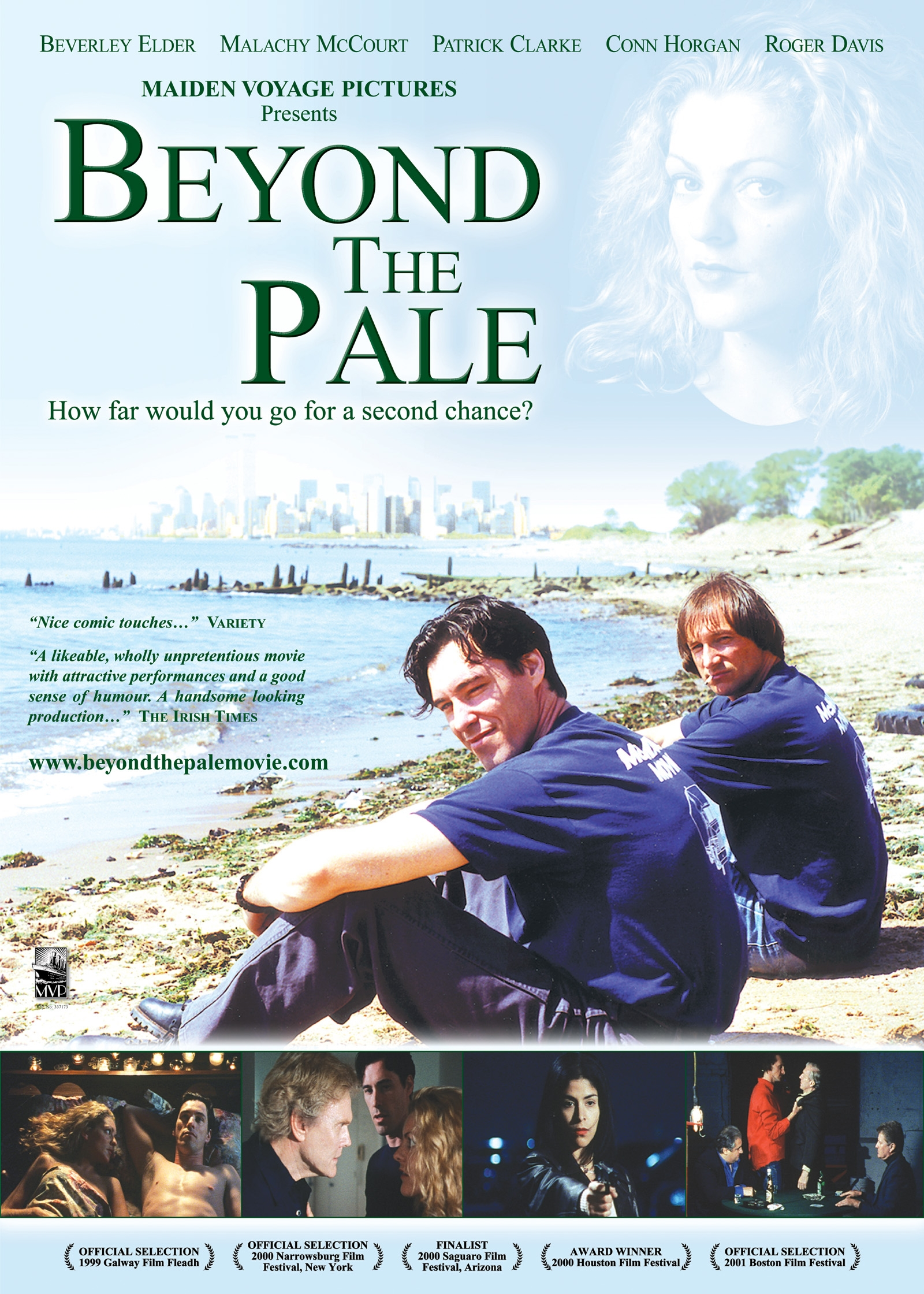
- Cinema Poster
- Directed by: George Bazala
- Written by: Patrick Clarke; George Bazala
- Produced by: Patrick Clarke; Jack Alvino
- Starring: Patrick Clarke; Malachy McCourt; Roger Davis
- Cinematography: Adam Vardy
- Edited by: Michael Sullivan
- Music by: Ned Ginsberg
- Production company: Maiden Voyage Pictures
- Distributed by: Maiden Voyage Pictures; RMG Chart Entertainment
- Release date: 2000
- Running time: 96 minutes
- Countries: United States; Ireland
- Language: English
- Budget: $180,000 (estimated)

Beyond the Pale is a 2000 immigrant drama set in mid-1980s New York, directed by George Bazala and starring Patrick Clarke, Malachy McCourt, and Roger Davis.

== Plot ==
Two Irish men, Patrick Shaw (Patrick Clarke) and Seamus O'Sullivan (Conn Horgan), entered the U.S. illegally. Landing in New York, the pair start with dreams of making it big but soon find themselves in dead-end jobs and drifting apart. As Seamus pursues various get-rich-quick schemes, the more cautious Patrick holds down a janitor's job and plays good Samaritan to washed-up alcoholic author Tom Finnegan (Malachy McCourt). Along the way Patrick falls for Helen (Beverley Elder), a struggling actress entangled in a messy break up with Jeffrey (Roger Davis). Everything comes to a head when Seamus turns to backroom gambling, Tom hits rock bottom and Jeffrey makes a vicious play to win Helen back.

== Development ==
Beyond the Pale began its life at a table in the Film Centre Cafe in Hells Kitchen NYC in June 1996 when George Bazala and Patrick Clarke thrashed out an idea based on the life of an Irish immigrant in late 1980s New York City. The pair had just finished working together on 'Fall from Grace' a Hunter College grad thesis short film. Work on the script was completed in August 1996, NYU film grad Jack Alvino signed on as co-producer and Maiden Voyage Pictures was formed to seek financing for filming. Preparations got underway to shoot the film's opening segment in Clarke's hometown of Dublin, Ireland. This would prove to be an extremely ambitious undertaking considering they had only raised US$20,000. Clarke flew to Dublin on December 2, 1996, to make preparations for the arrival of the crew and to scout and secure locations and equipment. A week later, Bazala flew in to audition actors. By the time Alvino and the rest of the crew arrived, everything was miraculously in place. The tight five-day shooting schedule with a skeleton crew proved extremely tough. Clarke's friends and relatives were drafted to help with everything from catering to horse wrangling. On 19 December, the opening eleven minutes of Beyond the Pale were in the can.

Bazala recalled, “We were all very anxious to see the results of our adventure in Dublin. Unfortunately, we would have to wait until February 1997, when we had raised the funds to process, sync, and transfer the film. It was mid-March before editor Michael Sullivan had completed a rough cut. We couldn’t have been happier with the outcome”. Beyond the Pale had its world premiere at the Galway Film Fleadh on 5 July 1999 and its US premiere at the 33rd Houston International Film Festival (9 April 2000), where it won for best dramatic feature film.

== Cast ==
- Patrick Clarke as Patrick Shaw
- Malachy McCourt as Tom Finegan
- Conn Horgan as Seamus O'Sullivan
- Beverley Elder as Helen
- Roger Davis as Jeffrey
- Ruth Miller as Miss Mooney
- Valentina Olmos as Conchita
- Brian Mallon as The Cop
- Iris Braydon as Lily
- Worth Howe as Mr Arnold
- William Stone Mahoney as Gambler
- Neale Harper as Bob
- Catherine Natale as Margie
- Jason Killalee as Sean
- Tom Finegan as Man on Street (Cameo)
- Eric Mabius as Brian (Cameo)

== Awards ==
Beyond the Pale won for best drama at the 2000 Houston Film Festival.

== Filming locations ==
- Dublin, Ireland
- Manhattan, New York
- Brooklyn, New York
- Queens, New York
- Staten Island, New York
