= Conversations with Filmmakers Series =

The Conversations with Filmmakers Series is part of the University Press of Mississippi which is sponsored by Mississippi's eight state universities. The mission of the Series is to publish collected interviews with world-famous directors. The current Filmmakers Series editor is Gerald Peary, a noted film critic and Professor of Communications and Journalism at Suffolk University, Boston. Peary was appointed to this position following the death of the Series' original general editor, Dr. Peter Brunette.

== Background ==
The series was launched in 1998 with Gerald Peary's Quentin Tarantino: Interviews. It was favorably reviewed by MovieMaker magazine which found a balance and depth throughout saying, "Contemporary giants like Soderbergh, Oliver Stone and John Sayles are treated with just as much esteem as legends like Wilder and John Huston."

== Interviewees ==
- J. J. Abrams
- Robert Aldrich
- Woody Allen
- Pedro Almodóvar
- Robert Altman
- Theo Angelopoulos
- Michelangelo Antonioni
- Dorothy Arzner
- Hal Ashby
- Ingmar Bergman
- Bernardo Bertolucci
- Peter Bogdanovich
- Kathryn Bigelow
- Danny Boyle
- Stan Brakhage
- Albert Brooks
- Charles Burnett
- Tim Burton
- James Cameron
- Jane Campion
- Frank Capra
- John Cassavetes
- Claude Chabrol
- Charlie Chaplin
- The Coen Brothers
- Francis Ford Coppola
- Sofia Coppola
- Roger Corman
- Wes Craven
- David Cronenberg
- George Cukor
- Julie Dash
- Jonathan Demme
- Clint Eastwood
- Blake Edwards
- Atom Egoyan
- Asghar Farhadi
- Federico Fellini
- David Fincher
- John Ford
- William Friedkin
- Su Friedrich
- Samuel Fuller
- Terry Gilliam
- Jean-Luc Godard
- Stuart Gordon
- Peter Greenaway
- D. W. Griffith
- Michael Haneke
- Howard Hawks
- Todd Haynes
- Werner Herzog
- Alfred Hitchcock
- Dennis Hopper
- John Huston
- Jim Jarmusch
- Neil Jordan
- Wong Kar-wai
- Lloyd Kaufman
- Elia Kazan
- Buster Keaton
- Abbas Kiarostami
- Krzysztof Kieślowski
- Barbara Kopple
- Harmony Korine
- Stanley Kubrick
- Akira Kurosawa
- Fritz Lang
- David Lean
- Ang Lee
- Spike Lee
- Mike Leigh
- Kasi Lemmons
- George Lucas
- Baz Luhrmann
- Sidney Lumet
- David Lynch
- Guy Maddin
- Louis Malle
- Joseph L. Mankiewicz
- Albert and David Maysles
- Steve McQueen
- Jonas Mekas
- Merchant-Ivory
- Russ Meyer
- Anthony Minghella
- Errol Morris
- Nichols and May
- Gaspar Noé
- Alan J. Pakula
- Brian De Palma
- Jafar Panahi
- Alexander Payne
- Sam Peckinpah
- Arthur Penn
- Christian Petzold
- Roman Polanski
- Abraham Polonsky
- Michael Powell
- Otto Preminger
- Satyajit Ray
- Jean Renoir
- Alain Resnais
- Martin Ritt
- Robert Rodriguez
- Éric Rohmer
- George A. Romero
- Ken Russell
- David O. Russell
- Carlos Saura
- John Sayles
- Fred Schepisi
- Martin Scorsese
- Ridley Scott
- Ousmane Sembène
- M. Night Shyamalan
- John Singleton
- Steven Soderbergh
- Steven Spielberg
- George Stevens
- Oliver Stone
- Quentin Tarantino
- Andrei Tarkovsky
- Lars von Trier
- Margarethe von Trotta
- François Truffaut
- Liv Ullmann
- Agnes Varda
- Paul Verhoeven
- John Waters
- Lois Weber
- Peter Weir
- Orson Welles
- Billy Wilder
- Michael Winterbottom
- John Woo
- William Wyler
- Zhang Yimou
- Fred Zinnemann
