= Jami Bernard =

American film critic

Jami Bernard (born August 10, 1956) is an American author and media consultant, an award-winning film critic for the New York Post and The New York Daily News, and the founder of Barncat Publishing. She has appeared in documentaries as herself, including the Independent Film Channel's Indie Sex series, on which she was a consultant. Bernard wrote a Lois Lane comic for DC Comics in which Lois is based on Bernard's early career at the New York Post. Bernard is a frequent guest on TV and radio shows; appearances include on Oprah, The Today Show, and Lynn Samuels on Satellite Radio. Her work has been published in numerous magazines, including Entertainment Weekly, Seventeen, Glamour, and Self.

== Family ==
Bernard's maternal grandparents were from Białystok, Poland. She was raised in Jackson Heights, Queens, New York. Her paternal grandfather took the name Bernard while passing through England en route to the United States; it is unclear what his original surname was or what country he came from in Eastern Europe. Her father, Sam Bernard, studied woodcarving briefly under the tutelage of Chaim Gross, who volunteered to teach art to underprivileged youth. Bernard and her close family are Jewish.

== Education ==
Bernard attended Newtown High School and was a columnist for "The Tower," the school newspaper. She graduated from Barnard College in 1978 and was editor of "The Barnard Bulletin."

== Books ==
Bernard has written eight books, including The Incredible Shrinking Critic, Chick Flicks, Total Exposure, First Films, Quentin Tarantino: The Man and His Movies, and Breast Cancer: There and Back.

== Career ==
Bernard is a member and former chair of the New York Film Critics Circle and a member of the National Society of Film Critics . In 2008, she founded Barncat Publishing , where she coaches writers and helps them finish their books and book proposals.

Jami Bernard appears in the 2009 documentary film For the Love of Movies: The Story of American Film Criticism via a homemade comic video showing her life at home playing with her cat and being self-employed after being removed as film critic for the New York Daily News.

== Breast cancer advocate ==
Bernard is a survivor of breast cancer and a breast cancer advocate and keynote speaker who wrote a book about her experience—Breast Cancer: There and Back—and writes a regular column for MAMM magazine, the magazine for women with cancer .
