= Stay Until Tomorrow =

- Directed by: Laura Colella
- Written by: Laura Colella
- Produced by: Laura Colella; Amy Geller; Fabrice Lorenceau
- Starring: Eleanor Hutchins; Alison Folland; Barney Cheng; Patrick Clarke; Reena Shah; Slava Mogutin; Aaron Jungles
- Cinematography: Richard Rutkowski
- Music by: Alec K. Redfearn
- Production company: Knowtribe Films
- Release date: 2004
- Running time: 92 minutes
- Country: United States
- Language: English
- Budget: $500,000 (estimated)

Stay Until Tomorrow is a 2004 American romantic comedy-drama film written and directed by Independent Spirit John Cassavetes Award winner Laura Colella. It stars Eleanor Hutchins, Barney Cheng, Alison Folland with supporting roles by Reena Shah, Patrick Clarke and Slava Mogutin. The plot follows Nina (Hutchins), a former teenage Soap opera star who returns to her hometown of Providence after an extended period of world travel. Filmed in Providence in the summer of 2003, Stay Until Tomorrow was produced by Amy Geller, Laura Colella and Fabrice Lorenceau and released in 2004.

== Development ==
Stay Until Tomorrow was developed through Sundance Institute filmmakers/screenwriters lab in 2000.

== Cast ==
- Eleanor Hutchins as Nina
- Barney Cheng as Jim
- Alison Folland as Carla
- Reena Shah as Sheila
- Patrick Clarke as Patrick
- Slava Mogutin as Andrei
- Aaron Jungles as Mark
- Eddie Bernard as Tonio
- Paul Kaup as Jeoy
- John Kenower as Todd
- Pierre Poirot as Philippe

== Filming locations ==
- Providence, Rhode Island
