= Wasabi Tuna =

- Directed by: Lee Friedlander
- Written by: Celia Fox
- Produced by: Lee Friedlander; Celia Fox
- Cinematography: Ben Kufrin
- Edited by: Larry Madaras; Ken Morrisey
- Music by: Raymond Jones
- Distributed by: Cafe Entertainment Studios; Indican Pictures
- Release dates: August 20, 2003 (premiere); May 7, 2004 (Los Angeles)
- Running time: 93 mins.
- Language: English

Wasabi Tuna is a 2003 independent Cafe Entertainment Studios action comedy film starring Jason London, Barney Cheng, Tim Meadows, Antonio Sabàto, Jr., Alanna Ubach, Guillermo Díaz, Alexis Arquette, Megan Cavanagh, and Arturo Gil. Anna Nicole Smith is featured as herself.

Directed and produced by Lee Friedlander, the screenplay was written by Celia Fox, who also executive produced.

Wasabi Tuna premiered on August 20, 2003. It was issued on DVD on October 28, 2005, by Indican Pictures.

== Plot ==
This camp screwball comedy of errors, that includes many over-the-top stereotypes, is set at Halloween against the backdrop of West Hollywood, California.

Five friends, interior designer Evan (played by London); interior designer Harvey (played by Cheng); stockbroker Dave (played by Meadows); spinning instructor Fredrico (played by Sabàto); and Emme (played by Ubach), a sassy young woman obsessed with style and classic movies, have all been anticipating the West Hollywood Halloween Parade on Santa Monica Boulevard, which is the biggest and brashest block party of the year. Their annual tradition of joining the festivities in outrageous costumes has become part of local legend.

It is the night before Halloween, however, and they still have not decided what to be. Evan and Harvey, who are femme gay boyfriends and business partners, have come up with food-themed sushi costumes that everyone refers to as "wasabi tuna." Emme offers another suggestion — that they all dress up as gang members.

They all opt for the gang theme but are unable to find the appropriate attire at the local stores. They then decide to seek out real life gang members to achieve the authentic, straight-from-the-hood look they want.

While doing interior design work for an extremely wealthy Armenian woman who is actually in the illegal drug trade, Harvey and Evan become unwitting drug couriers. After they are arrested, there is a comic scene at the WeHo sheriff's station with them attempting to talk their way out of trouble.

Dave goes to East L.A., where he comes across a real gang member named Romeo (played by Díaz). He makes a deal with Romeo to loan him his Porsche in exchange for his lowrider gang car. A case of mistaken identity makes a vengeful, rival gang get after them. There is a comic drive-by shooting scene. Also, by driving Romeo's lowrider they are unknowingly carrying an illegal cache of weapons.

Reality TV actress Anna Nicole Smith's (appearing as herself) pet dog, Sugar-Pie, is kidnapped. All is havoc, as a group of drag queens who dress like Smith, Santa Ana Anna (played by Arquette), Eenie Anna (played by Gil, who is a dwarf), Brown Sugar Anna and Hot Spicy Anna, believe that Harvey stole their idol's dog and band together to get Sugar-Pie back for Smith.

A wild chase ensues as gang members, drug dealers, drag queens, and the police force are after the partygoers. They end up in Chinatown, where an old Chinese man, Mr. Ling (also played by Cheng), is in partnership with the Armenian drug shrew. Everything culminates with the clash of personalities colliding in a feisty showdown. A free-for-all street fight, involving the gang members, drug dealers, undercover DEA detectives, a trio of female martial arts gymnasts and the Santa Ana Annas erupts and everyone battles it out with flying fists, feet and wigs.

Anna Nicole Smith herself arrives and saves the day. As she shamelessly mocks herself, Smith clears up the Sugar Pie mess, hands the drugs over to the police, and invites the group to her Halloween party, where they change into their "wasabi tuna" costumes.

== Soundtrack ==
The lead single, 'Nothing Like Cali,' by The Brüse Bros. [rappers Blu (Johnson Barnes) and Black (aka Donel Smokes)], is subsequently also found on the 2003 unreleased project, 'The Brüse Brothers Academy LP,' on the DME Music (now, Dimond Mind Recordings) label.

== See also ==
- List of films set around Halloween
