= For the Love of Movies: The Story of American Film Criticism =

- Theatrical release poster
- Directed by: Gerald Peary
- Written by: Gerald Peary
- Produced by: Amy Geller
- Starring: Roger Ebert; Owen Gleiberman; Stanley Kauffmann; Harry Knowles
- Narrated by: Patricia Clarkson
- Cinematography: Craig Chivers; Nick Kurzon; Amy Geller; Edward Slattery
- Edited by: Sabrina Zanella-Foresi; Aleksandar Lekic
- Music by: Bobby B. Keyes
- Release date: March 17, 2009 (SXSW)
- Running time: 81 minutes
- Country: United States
- Language: English

For the Love of Movies: The Story of American Film Criticism is a 2009 documentary film dramatizing a hundred years of American film criticism through film clips, historic photographs, and on-camera interviews with many of today’s important reviewers, mostly print but also Internet. It was produced by Amy Geller, written and directed by long-time Boston Phoenix film critic Gerald Peary, and narrated by Patricia Clarkson. Critics featured include Roger Ebert of The Chicago Sun-Times, A.O. Scott of The New York Times, Lisa Schwarzbaum of Entertainment Weekly, Kenneth Turan of The Los Angeles Times, and Elvis Mitchell, host of the public radio show The Treatment.

Many more critics, journalists, and writers from the present and past appear in film clips and interviews. Among them: Jami Bernard, Manny Farber, Andrew Sarris, Molly Haskell, J. Hoberman, Harlan Jacobson, Stanley Kauffmann, Stuart Klawans, Leonard Maltin, Janet Maslin, Wesley Morris, Rex Reed, B. Ruby Rich, Jonathan Rosenbaum, Richard Schickel, David Sterritt, Pauline Kael, Richard Corliss, and Gene Siskel.

Other figures from film history appear in photographs and include Vincent Canby, Bosley Crowther, James Agee, Otis Ferguson, Vachel Lindsay, and Frank E. Woods.

Bringing the history of film criticism up to the present, the film introduces internet-based critics Harry Knowles of Ain't It Cool News and Karina Longworth, who wrote at the time for spout.com.

== Theme ==
Gerald Peary says, "For the Love of Movies is the first feature documentary to tell the rich, colorful, and undeniably controversial story of the American film critic ... I had to sort of invent what I think is the history of film criticism, because there wasn’t any formally written book on it."

Partly due to difficulties in getting financial backing, the documentary took nearly a decade to make. Peary says, "I guess one of the things that happened during that period was the so-called decline of print journalism ... eight years ago, film criticism still seemed a viable profession ... by now, there are over fifty critics who are made redundant"

Filmmaker Magazine asks: What is the crisis of criticism? Gerald Peary replies: Simply that if you are a print critic you are in danger of losing your job at any moment. As newspapers are worried about dropping dead, it seems like film critics are a particular target. The film begins by saying, "There are 24 critics who have lost their jobs in the last several years," but since we finished the film, many more have lost their jobs. A lot of people are tagged with a title of ex-critic, but they were not ex when we filmed them just a few years ago. Sure, you can work on the web, but if you do that you're not getting paid much, or at all. And critics should be paid — this isn't an amateur thing to do, it's not like Sunday painting.

"It's a stop-the-bleeding movie," Peary tells Variety. "I hope that those who watch the movie value criticism and will read it and demand it in their newspapers."

Peary laments, "Today, people select which movies to see based on advertising. Lots of excellent little pictures — foreign, independent, and documentaries — are passing through without being seen. The only way to get people to go to those films, because they have no advertising budgets, is reviews by good critics ... We want people to read criticism. One way to motivate people to do that is by showing the critics’ faces and letting their voices be heard."

== Critical reception ==
- Scott Macaulay: "For the Love of Movies: The Story of American Film Criticism is a tender and detailed documentary spanning the art form’s beginnings, middle, present and future."
- Victoria Large: "Peary has wisely determined that the best defense of film criticism is, well, film criticism itself. In addition to archive footage and lively interviews, he includes voice-over readings of excerpts of film reviews past, lively passages that remind us that great critics have to be great writers, astute observers and thinkers who are skilled in expressing themselves."
- Michael Guillen: "Gerald Peary sharply evaluates the history of critical-analytical writing on moving pictures in this stimulating tour through the rise, fall and reorientation of film criticism in the United States ... a smart look at key figures and how they've changed public consciousness of both the movies and criticism itself."
- Roger Ebert: "I enjoyed it immensely, I learned a lot. Very well done, edited, researched — and narrated!"
- Eugene Hernandez: "Peary spent nearly a decade making For the Love of Movies, working with producer Amy Geller to examine the history and future of film criticism."
- Anne Thompson: "Thus the film, which offers an excellent history of American film criticism, also serves as a valentine to a vanishing profession, something Peary could never have foreseen ... It's hard not to feel sad at the end of this movie, about a world that no longer exists, a profession that seems to be dying in front of our eyes."
- David Bordwell: "It’s a lively and thoughtful survey, interspersing interviews with contemporary critics with a chronological account that runs from Frank E. Woods to Harry Knowles ... For the Love of Movies offers a concise, entertaining account of mass-market movie criticism, and I think a lot of universities would want to use it in film and journalism courses."
- Ty Burr: "...this is a meal no one has ever cooked before: an affectionate, knowledgeable overview of film criticism from the silent era to the Internet ... the movie’s a lively and important first step in assaying the worth of a field on the verge of extinction, as more and more professional reviewers are let go from struggling news organizations (nearly 60 in the past 3 1/2 years)."
- Chris Faraone: "... Peary incinerates the barrier between subject and reporter, demonstrating more than mere comprehension of the art he's scrutinized for decades ... his larger challenge was to assemble a story that would entertain not just critics but those pedestrians who don’t know Cinéaste from bouillabaisse."
- Jeffrey Wells: "For The Love of Movies…is finally here and it does the job nicely. Which is to say intelligently, competently, lovingly and, after a fashion, comprehensively ... It's a hell of a subject — a chronicle of magnificent obsessions and magnificent dreams, and a rise-and-fall story covering scores of critics, the entirety of the Hollywood film culture from the '20s to the present, and hundreds if not thousands of movies."
- Chale Nafus: "Gerald Peary’s seminal cinematic exploration of the wealth of American film criticism provides a wonderful roadmap of where we have been and observes the many directions the whole endeavor is now moving."
- Variety’s Joe Leydon argued that for "all its attempts to offer an expansive and exhaustive historical account, the docu is riddled with glaring gaps and facile transitions. Some notables are extremely conspicuous by their absence. Inexplicably, there’s absolutely no mention of Judith Crist, even though her prominent outlets — The Today Show, New York Magazine, and TV Guide — made her, arguably, the most widely known U.S. critic in the 1960s and early ‘70s."

== History ==
For the Love of Movies: The Story of American Film Criticism premiered at the South by Southwest (SXSW) film festival in 2009. It was broadcast on TCM France and TCM Spain, and was shown in February 2011 on the Documentary Channel. In addition, it has been shown at the following venues:

- Hong Kong International Film Festival
- Festival Internacional de Cine en Guadalajara
- Nashville Film Festival
- Atlanta Film Festival
- RiverRun International Film Festival
- Independent Film Festival of Boston
- San Francisco International Film Festival
- Berkshire International Film Festival
- Lake Placid Film Festival
- Provincetown International Film Festival
- Edinburgh International Film Festival
- Jerusalem Film Festival
- Maine International Film Festival
- Woods Hole Film Festival
- Montreal World Film Festival
- Reykjavik International Film Festival
- Vancouver International Film Festival
- Mar del Plata Film Festival
- St. Louis International Film Festival
- Portland International Film Festival
- Cleveland International Film Festival
- Green Mountain Film Festival, Montpelier, Vermont
- Ashland Independent Film Festival
- Wisconsin Film Festival, Madison, WI
- Minneapolis-St. Paul International Film Festival
- deadCENTER Film Festival, Oklahoma City, OK
- Midnight Sun Film Festival, Sodankylä, Finland
- New Orleans Film Festival
- Houston Cinema Arts Festival
