= Stuart Klawans =

American film critic

Stuart Klawans has been the film critic for The Nation since 1988. He also writes a column on the visual arts for The New York Daily News.

== Education ==
He obtained his degree from Yale University.

== Awards and honors ==
He won the 2007 National Magazine Award for Reviews and Criticism and he received a 2003 Guggenheim Fellowship to work on a critical study of Preston Sturges. His 1998 book Film Follies: The Cinema Out of Order was a finalist in the Criticism category for the National Book Critics Circle Award.

== Appearances ==
Klawans appears in the 2009 documentary For the Love of Movies: The Story of American Film Criticism describing the importance and impact of two deceased film critics, Manny Farber and Vincent Canby. His work has appeared in The New York Times.

== Books ==
- Film Follies: The Cinema Out of Order
- Left in the Dark: Film Reviews and Essays, 1988-2001

- Crooked, but Never Common: The Films of Preston Sturges

== Family ==
Klawans is the son of the late Yoletta Klawans, a first grade teacher, and the late Jack Klawans, a manager of a chain of women's clothing stores. Klawans is married to Bali Miller, a private advisor in modern and contemporary art in New York. He lives in New York City.
