= Milwaukee, Minnesota =

- Directed by: Allan Mindel
- Written by: R.D. Murphy
- Produced by: Michael J. Brody; Jeff Kirshbaum
- Starring: Troy Garity; Alison Folland; Bruce Dern; Randy Quaid
- Cinematography: Bernd Heinl
- Edited by: David Rawlins
- Music by: Michael Convertino; Bobby Muzingo
- Distributed by: Tartan Films (United States and United Kingdom); Alliance Atlantis (International)
- Release date: January 24, 2003 (Slamdance Film Festival)
- Running time: 95 minutes
- Country: United States
- Language: English

Milwaukee, Minnesota is a 2003 American drama film starring Troy Garity, Alison Folland, Bruce Dern and Randy Quaid.

== Plot ==
Mentally disabled champion fisher Albert Burroughs (Troy Garity) grows up under the protection of his possessive mother, Edna (Debra Monk), and gentle shopkeeper Sean (Bruce Dern). When Edna suddenly dies, word of Albert's inheritance and his winnings from fishing tournaments attracts unscrupulous types to his small Wisconsin town, including Jerry James (Randy Quaid), who claims to be the young man's father. Albert, who's smarter than he appears, must fend off everyone's designs on his money.

== Cast ==
- Troy Garity as Albert Burroughs
- Alison Folland as Tuey Stites
- Randy Quaid as Jerry James
- Bruce Dern as Sean McNally
- Hank Harris as Stan Stites
- Debra Monk as Edna Burroughs
- Josh Brolin as Gary
- Holly Woodlawn as Transvestite

== Reception ==
The film has a 38% approval rating based on 34 reviews on Rotten Tomatoes, with an average rating of 5.1/10. The website's critics consensus reads: "Well-cast but frustratingly underwhelming, Milwaukee, Minnesota assembles a number of intriguingly unique ingredients that add up to a mostly middling mess." Nick Schager of Slant Magazine awarded the film one star out of four. Nev Pierce of the BBC awarded it two stars out of five.

== Accolades ==
Allan Mindel won the New American Cinema Award at the Seattle International Film Festival and the Young Critics Award for Best Feature at the Cannes Film Festival.
