= Vincent Canby =

American film and theatre critic (1924–2000)

- Born: July 27, 1924; Chicago, Illinois, U.S.
- Died: October 15, 2000 (aged 76); Manhattan, New York City, U.S.
- Education: Dartmouth College
- Occupation: Critic
- Partner: Penelope Gilliatt
- Writing career
- Period: 1948–2000
- Subjects: Film; theatre

Vincent Canby (July 27, 1924 – October 15, 2000) was an American film and theatre critic who was the chief film critic for The New York Times from 1969 until the early 1990s, then its chief theatre critic from 1994 until his death in 2000. He reviewed more than one thousand films during his tenure there.

== Early life ==
Canby was born in Chicago, the son of Katharine Anne (née Vincent) and Lloyd Canby. He attended boarding school in Christchurch, Virginia with novelist William Styron, and the two became friends. He introduced Styron to the works of E. B. White and Ernest Hemingway; the pair hitchhiked to Richmond to buy For Whom the Bell Tolls.

He became an ensign in the United States Navy Reserve on October 13, 1942, and reported aboard the Landing Ship, Tank 679 on July 15, 1944. He was promoted to lieutenant (junior grade) on January 1, 1946, while on LST 679 sailing near Japan. After the war, he returned to his alma mater Dartmouth College and graduated in 1947.

== Career ==
Canby obtained his first job as a journalist in 1948 for the Chicago Journal of Commerce. In 1951, he left Chicago for New York and was employed as a film critic by Variety for six years, before beginning to work for The New York Times. In February 1969, he was designated The New York Times' film critic, succeeding Renata Adler.

Canby was an enthusiastic supporter of filmmakers Stanley Kubrick, Spike Lee, Jane Campion, Mike Leigh, Rainer Werner Fassbinder, James Ivory and Woody Allen, who credited Canby's rave review of Take the Money and Run as a crucial point in his career. On the other hand, Canby was also highly critical of some otherwise acclaimed films, such as Rocky, The Empire Strikes Back, Return of the Jedi, Night of the Living Dead, After Hours, Blazing Saddles, A Christmas Story, Witness, Mask, The Natural, Rain Man, The Exorcist, One Flew Over the Cuckoo's Nest, Deliverance, The Godfather Part II, Alien and The Thing. Among the best-known texts written by Canby was an extremely negative review of the movie Heaven's Gate by Michael Cimino.

In December 1994, Canby switched his attention from film to theatre, having been named the Sunday theatre critic. He was replaced as the Times' chief film critic by Janet Maslin.

Canby was also an occasional playwright and novelist, writing the novels Living Quarters (1975) and Unnatural Scenery (1979) and the plays End of the War (1978), After All (1981) and The Old Flag (1984), a drama set during the American Civil War.

Canby's career and influence are discussed in the film For the Love of Movies: The Story of American Film Criticism by contemporary critics such as The Nation's Stuart Klawans.

== Personal life ==
Canby never married, but was, for many years, the companion of English author Penelope Gilliatt, who died in 1993. He died from cancer at a hospital in Manhattan on October 15, 2000. Almost three years later, upon the death of Bob Hope, Canby's byline appeared on the front page of The New York Times. Canby had written the bulk of Hope's obituary several years before.

Media offices
Preceded by Renata Adler	Chief film critic of The New York Times; 1969-1994	Succeeded by Janet Maslin
