= Anton (2008 film) =

Anton (AKA Trapped)
- Theatrical release poster
- Directed by: Graham Cantwell
- Written by: Anthony Fox
- Produced by: Patrick Clarke; Anthony Fox
- Starring: Gerard McSorley
- Cinematography: Fergal O'Hanlon
- Edited by: Breege Rowley
- Music by: Anna Rice
- Production companies: Fox Glove Films i4i Productions
- Distributed by: EastWest Film Distribution; High Fliers Films
- Release date: 10 October 2008
- Running time: 98 minutes
- Country: Ireland
- Language: English
- Budget: $800,000

Anton (released outside Ireland as Trapped) is a 2008 Irish action/thriller film directed by Graham Cantwell. It stars Anthony Fox as Anton, a man drawn into The Troubles along the Northern Ireland border in 1972. The film also features Gerard McSorley, Laura Way, Vincent Fegan, Andy Smith and Ronan Wilmot.

The film was written for the screen by Anthony Fox. Anton was produced by Patrick Clarke and Anthony Fox. EastWest Film Distribution and High Fliers Films released the film to theatres in Ireland and the UK on 8 October 2008. The film was nominated for 3 Irish Film Awards in 2009. The theme song, "One", was written and performed by Greg Pearle, John Illsley and Paul Brady.

== Plot ==
When Anton O'Neill returns home after five years at sea, he finds that 1970's Ireland is a radically different place to the one he left behind. Northern Ireland is in flames, and civil unrest has spilled south of the border to his beloved home in County Cavan. Anton’s attempts to create a life for himself and his young family are violently interrupted when his experience with explosives attracts the attention of dangerous subversives. Drawn into this illicit world against the wishes of his family, he is forced to choose between the woman he loves and the justice he believes in, all the while trying to stay one step ahead of Lynch, a corrupt detective hell bent on framing him. Falsely imprisoned, he engineers his escape and flees to Paris, but when he returns to salvage his original dream, the scene is set for a final confrontation with his former comrades.

== Cast ==
- Gerard McSorley as Detective Lynch
- Anthony Fox as Anton
- Laura Way as Maria
- Ronan Wilmott as Johnny
- Andy Smith as Brendan
- Cillian Roche as Edward
- Vincent Fegan as Diarmuid
- Griet Van Damme as Sophie
- Rachel Rath as Detective Byrne
- Richard Wall as Detective Thornton
- Rory Mullen as Detective Flynn
- Sean Stewart as Steven
- Patrick Clarke as Barrister Macken
- Emmett J. Scanlan as Prison Officer McMahon
