= The Temple Bar (public house) =

Pub in Dublin, Ireland

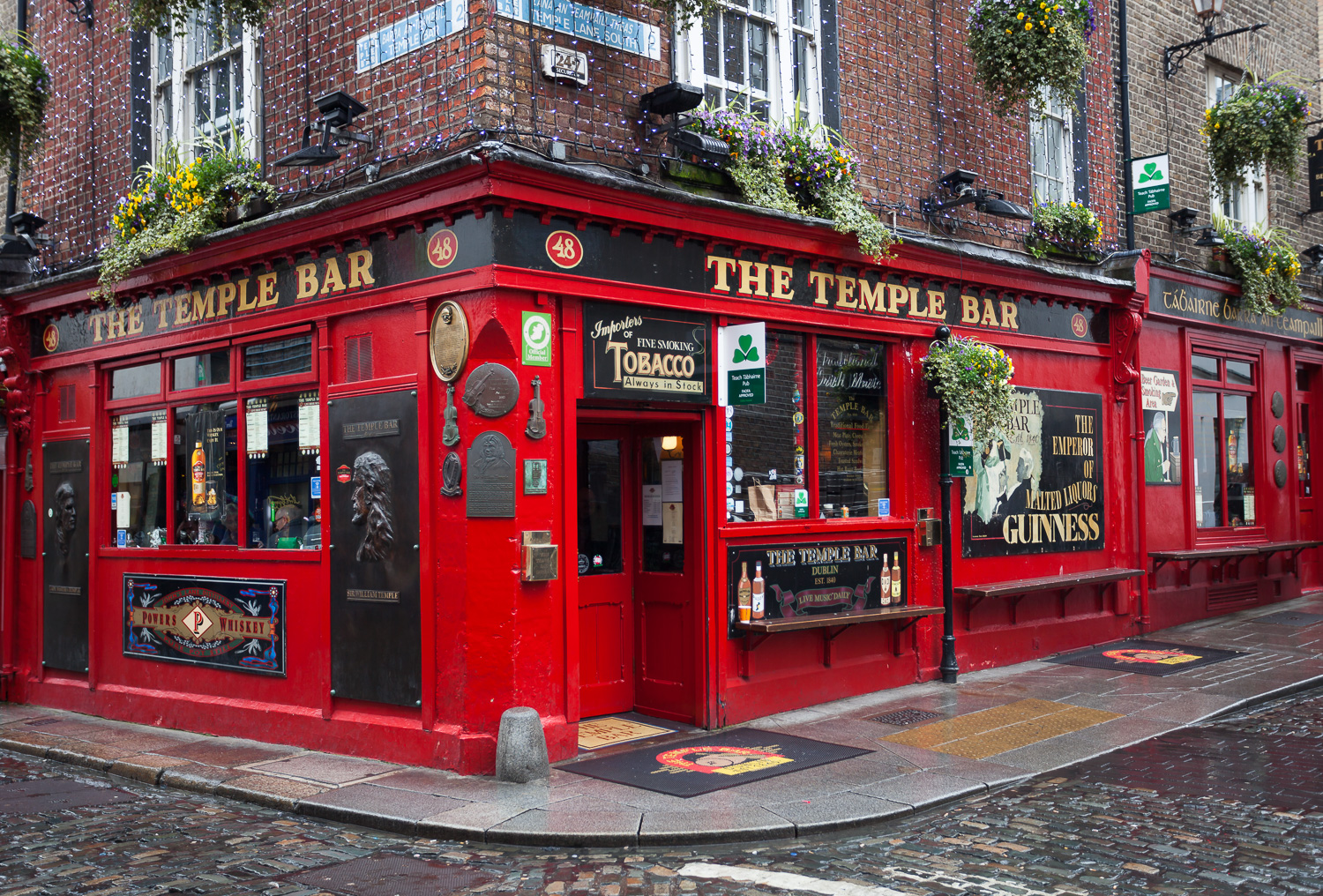
- The pub in 2015

- Location within Central Dublin Location within Ireland

General information
- Type: Public house
- Location: Temple Bar, 46–48 Temple Bar, Dublin, Ireland
- Coordinates: 53.3454°N 6.2641°W
- Completed: 1840 (186 years ago)
- Owner: Cleary family (since 1992)

Technical details
- Floor count: 3

Website
- Official website

The Temple Bar is a public house located at 46–48 Temple Bar in the Temple Bar area of Dublin, Ireland. Standing at the corner of Temple Lane South, the first pub on the site was reputedly licensed in the early 19th century.

The pub building at 48 Temple Bar is listed by Dublin City Council on its Record of Protected Structures, and is recorded in the National Inventory of Architectural Heritage (NIAH) as being built c. 1840.

== History ==
The Temple Bar area, in which the building stands, was so-named in the 17th century, owing to its association with Sir William Temple, father of Sir John Temple, who owned a house and gardens there.

Some sources associate the public house with James Harrison, a young publican who previously worked in his father's pub grocery business at 48 City Quay, and who reputedly obtained a licence for a new pub in the area in May 1819. According to related sources, Harrison sold his business to Cornelius O'Meara, a grocer, tea, wine and spirit merchant, in 1835. O'Meara, who also had another pub at 1 Wood Quay, remained in Temple Bar for around a decade.

Other sources, including the NIAH and a date on the gable wall of the building, date the development of the pub to 1840, when the "grocer and spirt dealer" James Farley was operating from the building (then listed as number 54 Temple Bar). Farley also had a provisions business at 38 Essex Street.

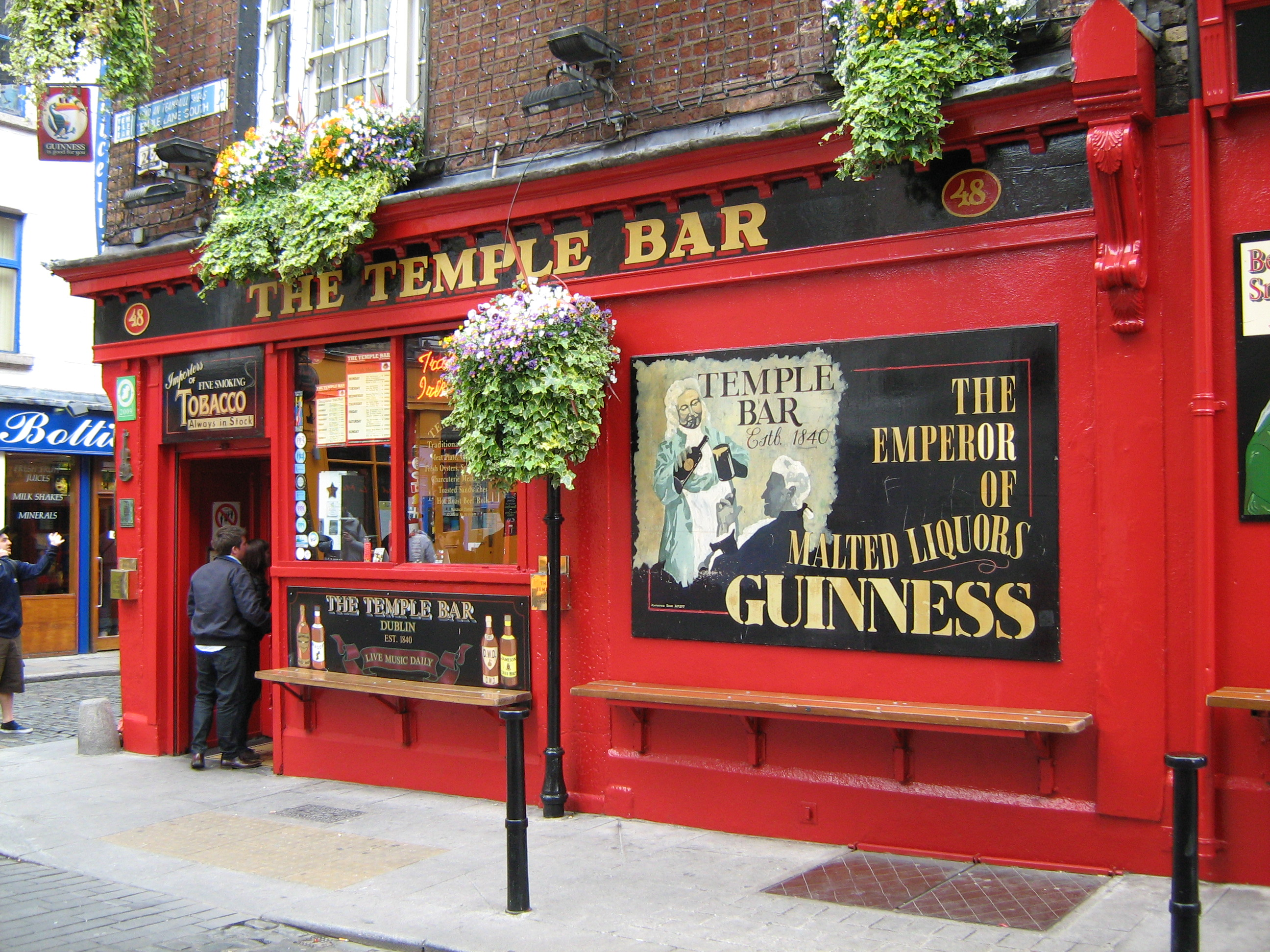
Building detail on the Temple Lane South elevation, 2011

Farley sold the property to William Cranston in 1847. He remained there until his retirement around 1865, at which point he sold it to merchant John Lambert, who was also trading at 38 City Quay. After making a "handsome profit" in his three years in Temple Bar, Lambert sold the property to husband and wife John Joseph and Ann Cranwill. John died at the premises in 1873. His widow attempted to carry on alone.

P. J. Hartnett's name was above the door of the business (then listed as number 48) in 1880, by which time the Temple Bar street had become prosperous, with booksellers, foundries, printers, goldsmiths and merchants. Hartnett remained at the location for eleven years.

In 1891, Josephine Purcell became the new owner, but she left the following year and was succeeded by James Byrne.

Byrne's stay was similarly short, for he sold the property in July 1894 to Patrick and Bridget Ramsbottom. The Ramsbottoms returned the building to its original purpose, over two phases, beginning with a small single-room snug, occupying the immediate corner of Temple Bar and Temple Lane South (from which time a stone wheel-guard is still present at ground level). Patrick Ramsbottom died unexpectedly in 1898, and Bridget continued on alone for seven years. The Gaffney brothers purchased it from her in 1905.

The Gaffneys moved on, and merchant Edward Walsh & Co. was in place by 1909. Walsh remained there until 1923, when Charles Archer took over the premises. He remained there for 28 years.

In 1951, the Fitzgerald family purchased the property. They stayed for ten years, with William Flannery arriving in 1961.

As of 2012, the owners were the Cleary family, who purchased the pub in 1992. At that point traditional features such as the Georgian style wyatt windows were reinstated and the pub changed to its current name. The business was expanded in the first part of the 21st century with the acquisition of adjacent properties, including The Temple Bar Trading Company shop, which opened at number 46. This section features a life-size bronze statue of James Joyce and a beer garden.

== Interior ==
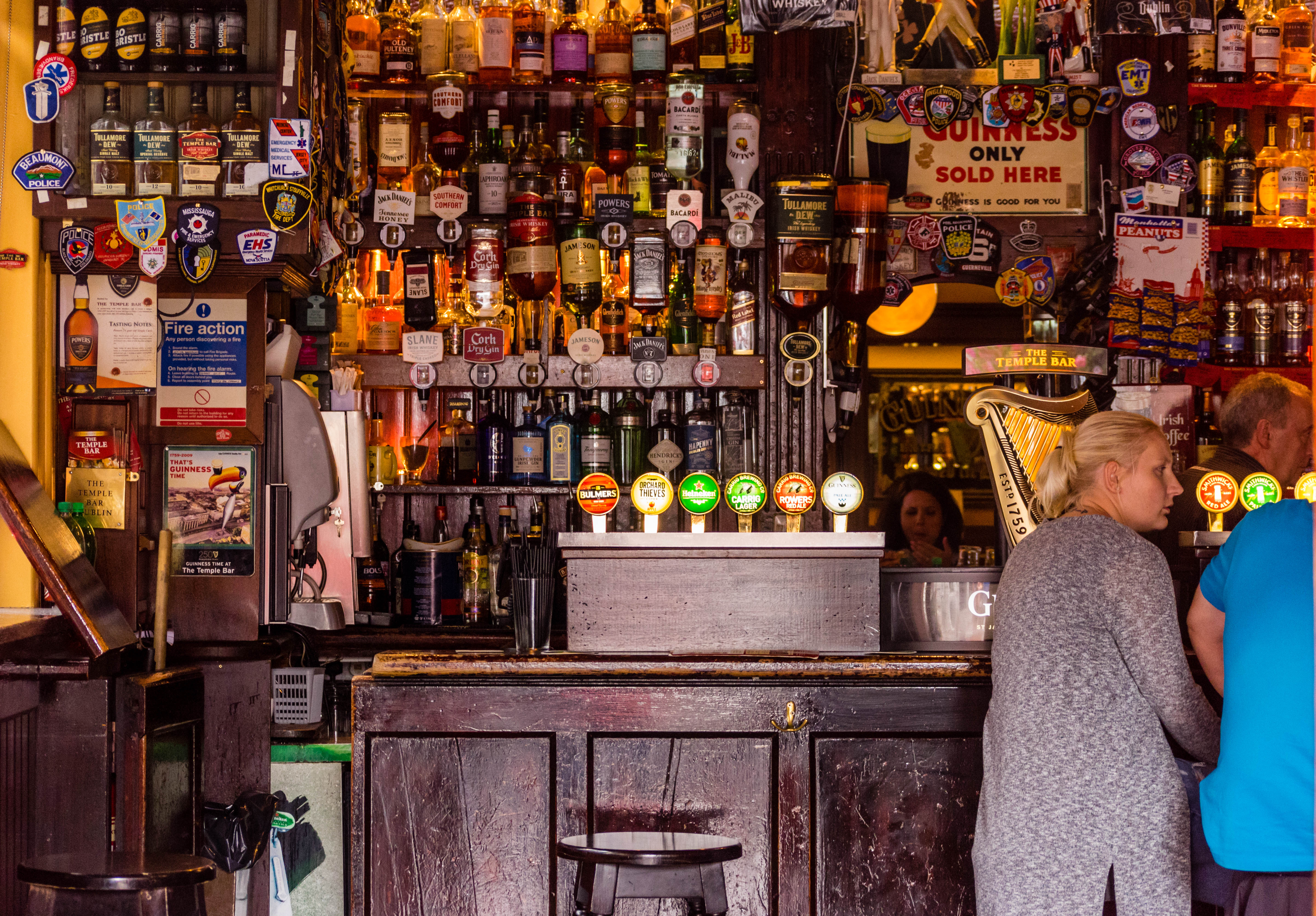
The small bar, dating from the Ramsbottoms' ownership in the late 19th century

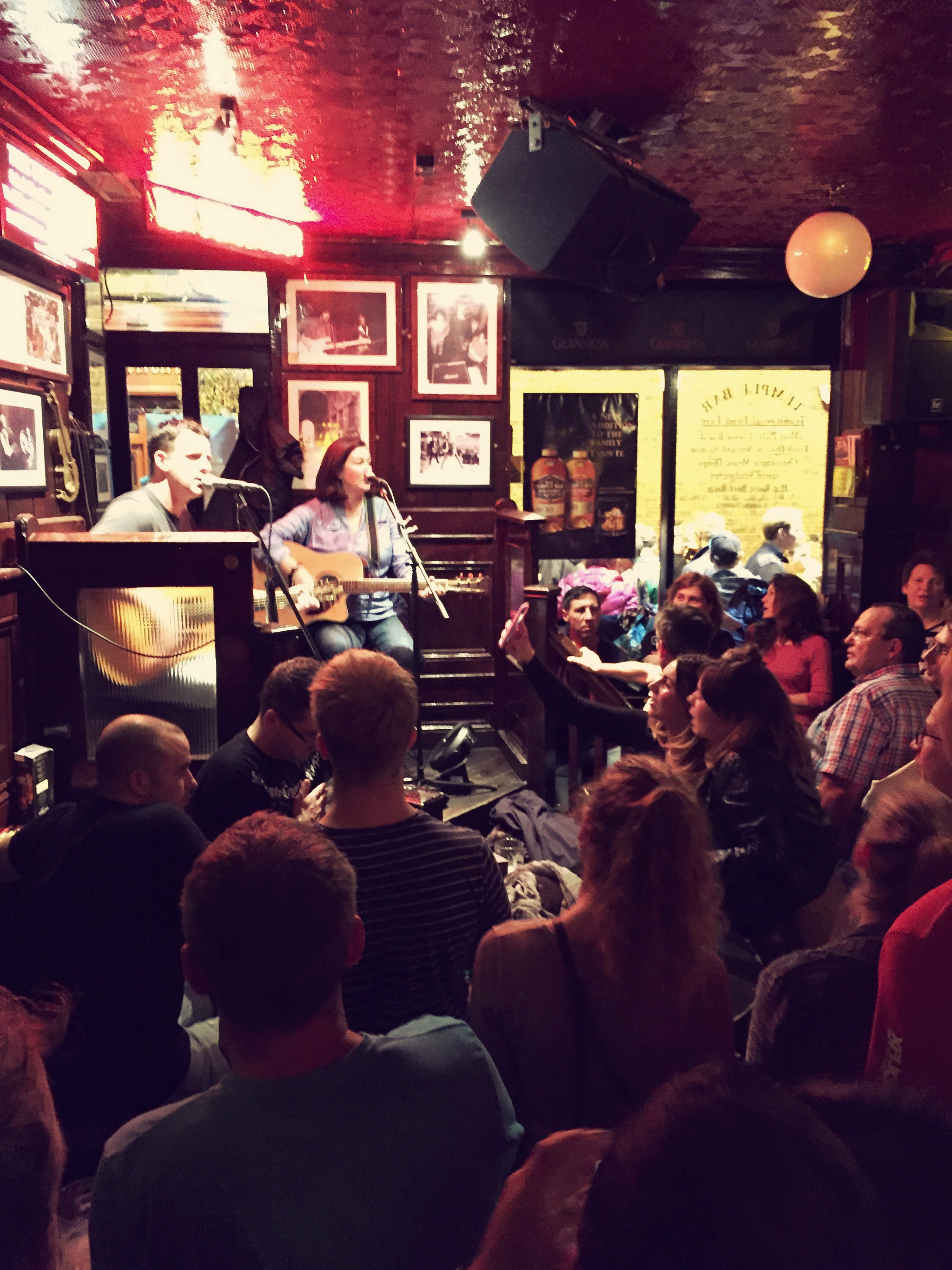
Live music in 2015
