= Gerald Peary =

American film critic, filmmaker, editor and curator

Gerald Peary (born October 30, 1944) is an American film critic, filmmaker, editor of the University Press of Mississippi, and a former curator of the Harvard Film Archive.

== Early life and education ==
Peary graduated from Rider University in 1964, went on to earn an MA in drama from New York University in 1966, and received a Ph.D. in Communications at the University of Wisconsin-Madison in 1977 with the dissertation, The Rise of the American Gangster Film, 1913-1930. Peary was a 1986 Fulbright Fellow in Belgrade, studying Yugoslavian film comedy.

== Career ==
Peary moved to Cambridge, Massachusetts, in 1978 to work as a first-string critic for The Real Paper, an alternative weekly, which closed in 1981. He is married to producer and filmmaker Amy Geller, former artistic director of the Boston Jewish Film Festival. Peary is the brother of American film critic and sportswriter Danny Peary.

He was a reviewer and columnist for the Boston Phoenix from 1996 until its demise in 2012. He is now a critic-at-large for The Arts Fuse, a Boston-based online arts magazine. He was from 1998 to 1999 the Acting Curator of the Harvard Film Archive and was general editor of the University Press of Mississippi Conversations with Filmmakers Series. From 1997-2021, he was the programmer/curator of the Cinematheque at Boston University's College of Communication, bringing independent filmmakers to show their works. He has programmed for the Institute of Contemporary Art-Boston, the Vancouver International Film Festival, and helped choose films for the Edinburgh International Film Festival.

His cinema articles have appeared in the Boston Globe, Los Angeles Times, The Globe and Mail, Chicago Tribune, and The Real Paper. Peary has also contributed to numerous magazines, including Positif, Film Comment, Cineaste, Sight & Sound, the Boston Review, Flare, and Maclean's.

Peary is a member of the Boston Society of Film Critics, the National Society of Film Critics, and FIPRESCI (the International Film Critics Association). He has frequently served as president of international critics' juries at film festivals including Rotterdam, Bangkok, Hong Kong, Karlovy Vary, San Francisco, and Mar del Plata. Peary has taught film studies and screenwriting classes at many universities, including The University of Wisconsin-Whitewater, Livingston College-Rutgers University, Boston University, Concordia University (Montreal), and Simon Fraser University (Vancouver). He taught for over 30 years at Suffolk University, Boston, where he was a professor of communication and journalism. He retired and was named Professor Emeritus in 2015.

Peary also made the feature documentaries Archie’s Betty (2015) and The Rabbi Goes West (2019). He made his acting debut playing a chess champion in Andrew Bujalski’s acclaimed independent feature, Computer Chess (2013).

Upon being asked "What drew you to film criticism?", Peary replied, "I’m a film critic for my love of film. I want other people to see the same films that I saw and love. From the age of four, I was going to movies all the time."

== Work ==
=== Books ===
- Rita Hayworth: A Pyramid Illustrated History of the Movies (1976). ISBN 978-0-515-04116-3.
- Women and the Cinema: A Critical Anthology, edited by Karyn Kay and Gerald Peary (1977). ISBN 978-0-525-47459-3.
- The Classic American Novel and the Movies, edited by Gerald Peary and Roger Shatzkin (1977). ISBN 978-0-8044-2681-7.
- The Modern American Novel and the Movies, edited by Gerald Peary and Roger Shatzkin (1978). ISBN 978-0-8044-2682-4.
- The American Animated Cartoon: A Critical Anthology, edited by Danny Peary and Gerald Peary (1980). ISBN 978-0-525-47639-9.
- Little Caesar (Wisconsin/Warner Brothers Screenplays series) edited by Gerald Peary (1981). ISBN 978-0-299-08450-9.
- Quentin Tarantino: Interviews (Conversations With Filmmakers Series) (1998). ISBN 978-1-57806-051-1.
- John Ford: Interviews (Conversations With Filmmakers Series) (2001). ISBN 978-1-57806-398-7.
- Samuel Fuller: Interviews (Conversations With Filmmakers Series) (2012). ISBN 978-1-61703-306-3.
- Mavericks: Interviews with the World's Iconoclast Filmmakers (2024). ISBN 978-08131-9794-4.
- A Reluctant Film Critic (2026) ISBN 979-8-89976-039-6

=== Films ===
- Twist (documentary, 1992) [story editor]
- Old Warrior (documentary short, 1994) [project consultant]
- Spanish Fly (comedy, 1998) [story editor, script consultant]
- Little Caesar: End of Rico, Beginning of the Antihero (video documentary short, 2005) [appeared as himself]
- For the Love of Movies: The Story of American Film Criticism (documentary, 2009) [director and writer]
- Computer Chess (comedy, 2013) [actor]
- Archie's Betty (documentary, 2015) [director and writer]
- The Rabbi Goes West (documentary, 2019) [co-director and writer]
- The Holdovers (comedy, 2024) [extra]
- Stranger Danger (2027) [actor]
