= Temple Bar, Dublin =

Temple Bar Barra an Teampaill (Irish)
- Neighbourhood of Dublin
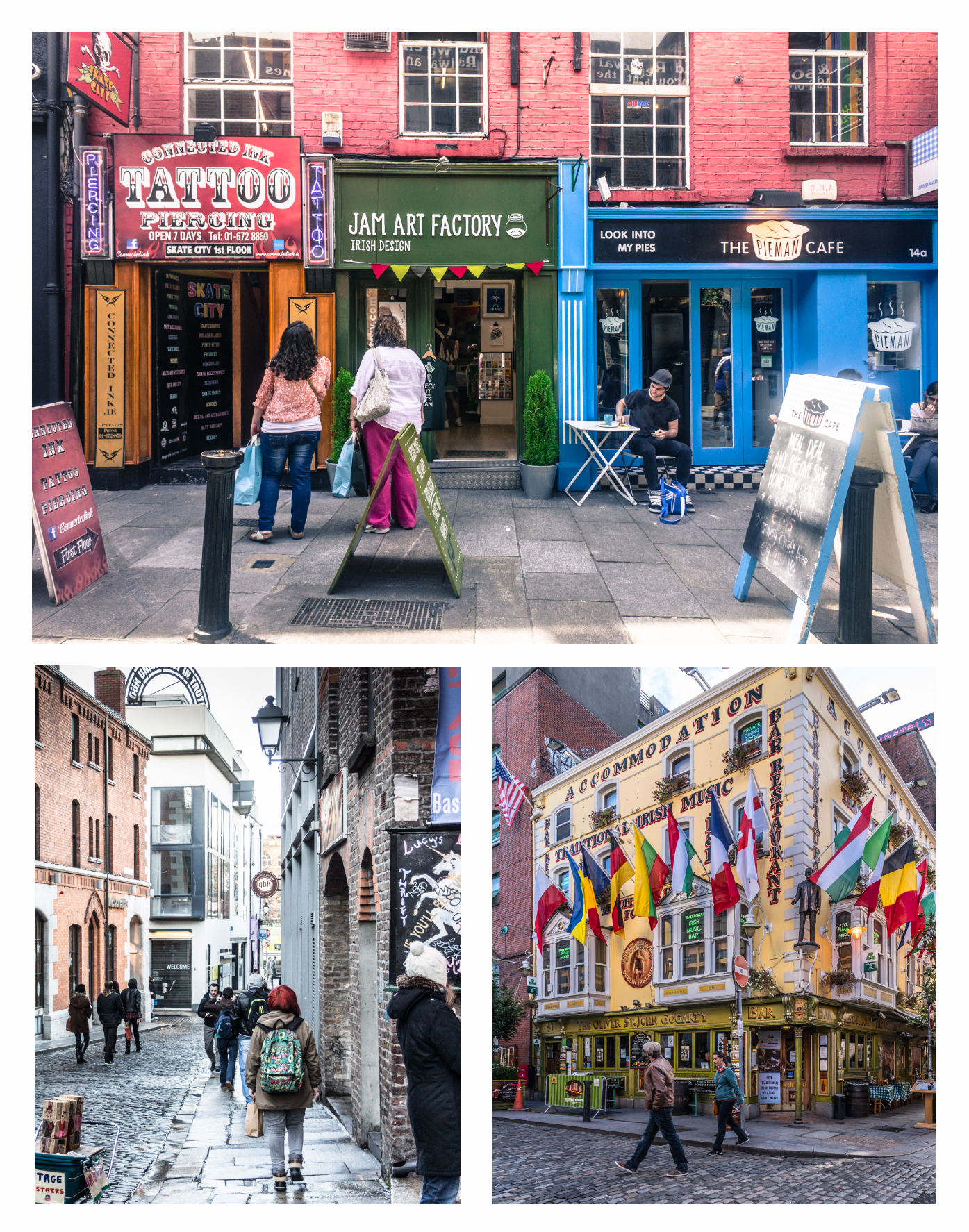
- Clockwise from top: Shops along Crown Alley, the Oliver St. John Gogarty bar, pedestrians on Fownes Street

- Location in Dublin Temple Bar (Dublin)
- Coordinates: 53°20′44″N 6°15′46″W
- Country: Ireland
- City: Dublin
- Postal district: D02

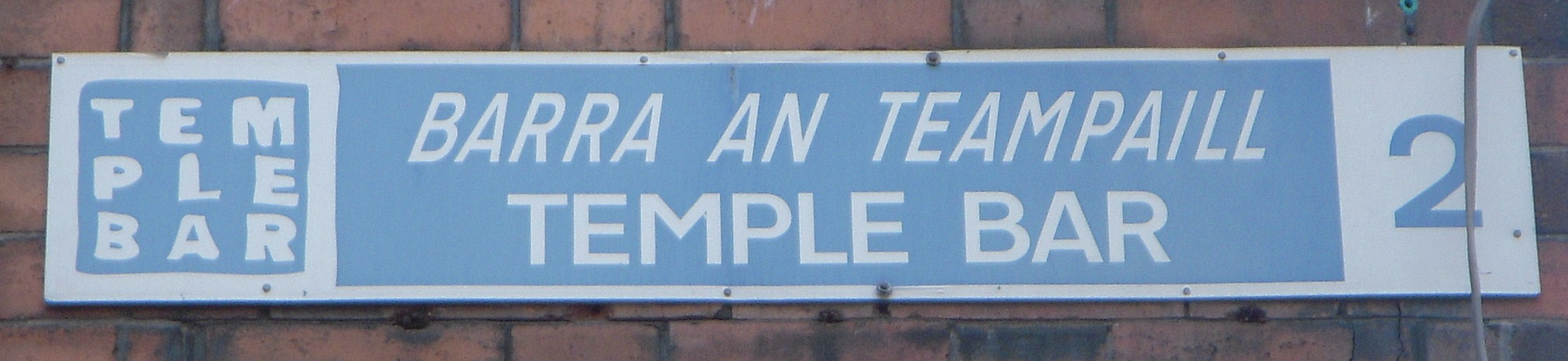
Street sign in Temple Bar

Temple Bar (Irish: Barra an Teampaill) is an area on the south bank of the River Liffey in central Dublin, Ireland. The area is bounded by the Liffey to the north, Dame Street to the south, Westmoreland Street to the east and Fishamble Street to the west. It is promoted as Dublin's 'cultural quarter' and, as a centre of Dublin's city centre's nightlife, is a tourist destination. Temple Bar is in the Dublin 2 postal district.

== History ==
=== Premodern history ===
In medieval (Anglo-Norman) times, the district was part of St. Andrews Parish and one of the earliest structures in the area was the Augustinian Friary of the Most Holy Trinity which was located near present-day Cecelia Street from around 1259 onwards. It was a suburb, located outside the city walls. However, the area fell into disuse beginning in the 14th century, as it was exposed to attacks by the native Irish.

The land was redeveloped in the 17th century, to create gardens for the houses of wealthy English families. At that time the shoreline of the River Liffey ran further inland of where it lies today, along the line formed by Essex Street, Temple Bar and Fleet Street. Marshy land to the river side of this line was progressively walled in and reclaimed, allowing houses to be built upon what had been the shoreline; but unusually, the reclaimed land was not quayed, so that the backyards of the houses ran down to the water's edge. (Not until 1812 were these backyards replaced by Wellington Quay.) The fronts of the houses then constituted a new street. The first mention of Temple Bar as the name of this street is in Bernard de Gomme's Map of Dublin from 1673, which shows the reclaimed land and new buildings. Other street names given nearby are Dammas Street (now Dame Street) and Dirty Lane (now Temple Lane South).

It is generally thought that the street known as Temple Bar got its name from the Temple family, whose progenitor Sir William Temple built a house and gardens there in the early 1600s. Temple had moved to Ireland in 1599 with the expeditionary force of the Earl of Essex, for whom he served as secretary. (He had previously been secretary of Sir Philip Sydney until the latter was killed in battle.) After Essex was beheaded for treason in 1601, Temple "retired into private life", but he was then solicited to become provost of Trinity College, serving from 1609 until his death in 1627 at age 72. William Temple's son John became the Master of the Rolls in Ireland (a senior judicial position) and was the author of a famous pamphlet excoriating the native Irish population for an uprising in 1641. John's son William Temple became a famous English statesman.

Despite this grand lineage, however, the name of Temple Bar street seems to have been more directly borrowed from the storied Temple Bar district in London, where the main toll gate into London was located dating back to medieval times:

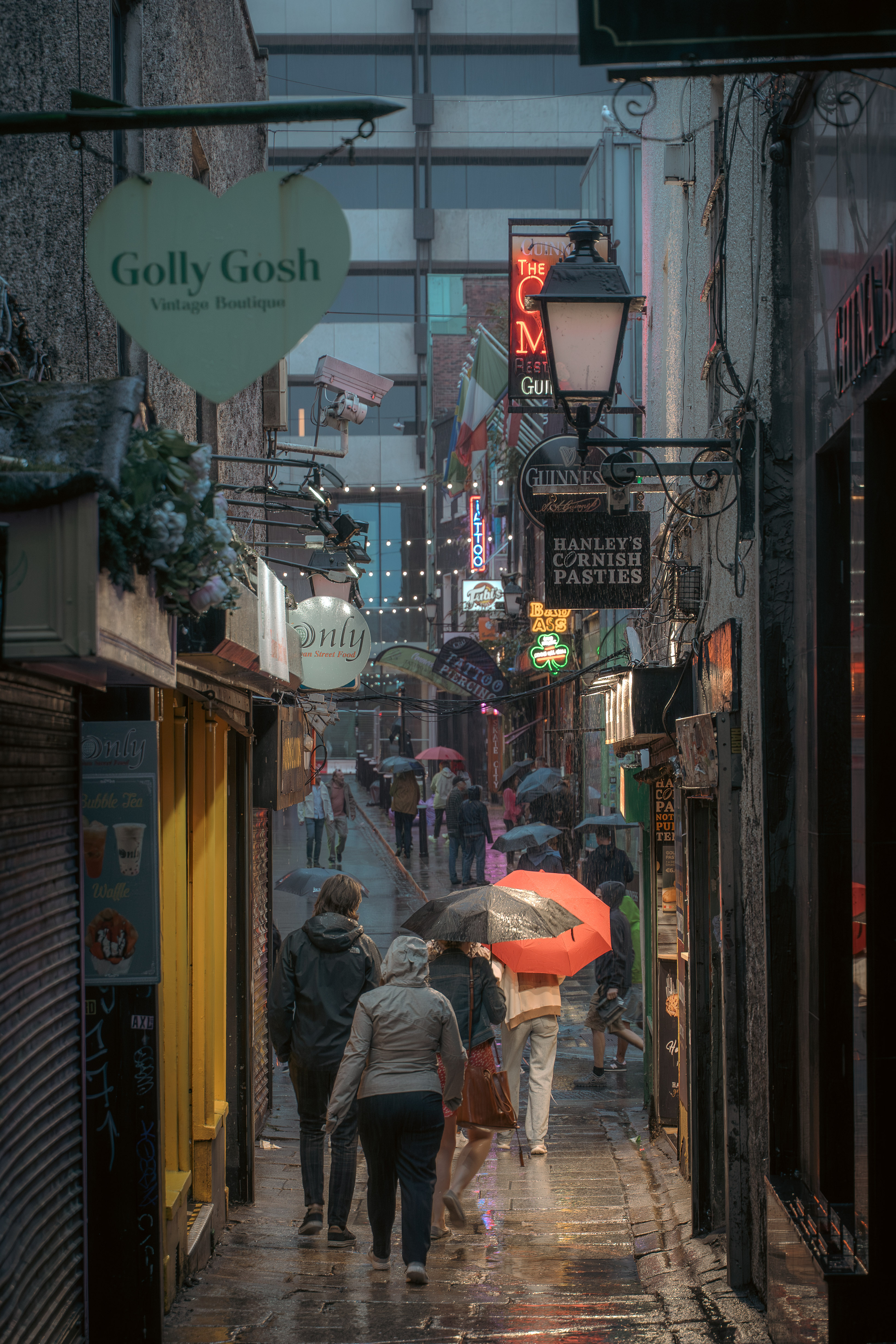
Pedestrians walking through Merchants' Arch in Temple Bar

London's Temple Bar is adjoined by Essex Street to the west and Fleet Street to the east, and streets of the same names occupy similar positions in relation to Dublin's Temple Bar. It seems almost certain therefore that Dublin's Temple Bar was named firstly in imitation of the historic Temple precinct in London. However, a secondary and equally plausible reason for using the name Temple Bar in Dublin would be a reference to one of the area's most prominent families, in a sort of pun or play on words. Or as it has been put more succinctly, Temple Bar 'does honour to London and the landlord in nicely-gauged proportions'.

Fishamble Street near Temple Bar was the location of the first performance of Handel's Messiah on 13 April 1742. An annual performance of the Messiah is held on the same date at the same location. A republican revolutionary group, the Society of the United Irishmen, was formed at a meeting in a tavern in Eustace Street in 1791.

In the 18th century, Temple Bar was the centre of prostitution in Dublin. During the 19th century, the area slowly declined in popularity, and in the 20th century, it suffered from urban decay, with many derelict buildings.

=== Modern history ===
In the late 1960s, as part of growing traffic problems in the city, Dublin Corporation hired German traffic expert Professor Karlheinz Schaechterle to examine the problem and produce a report on possible fixes. Following his recommendations, the state-owned transport company Córas Iompair Éireann commissioned US architects Skidmore Owings & Merrill to design a "grandiose transportation centre for central Dublin, with a southern terminal that would have demolished much of Temple Bar". A northern terminal was also proposed on Lower Ormond Quay, which would have extended from Swift's Row to Lower Liffey Street.

Following Schaechterle's plan, throughout the 1970s and 1980s CIÉ proposed to buy up and demolish property in the Temple Bar area to build this bus terminus, which would have included a large underground carpark with 1,500 spaces, a shopping centre on the ground and first floors, and the bus station at second-floor level accessed by long ramps for double-decker buses. While these plans were in development, CIÉ leased the buildings at low rents, which attracted artists, galleries, small shops, cafes, and other creative enterprises, creating a bohemian atmosphere despite widespread urban decay. Protests by An Taisce, residents, and traders led to the cancellation of the bus station project.

In 1987, the then Taoiseach Charles Haughey publicly stated that CIÉ should not control the area. In 1991, the government established a not-for-profit company, Temple Bar Properties, initially managed by Paddy Teahon and later by Laura Magahy, to oversee the regeneration of the area as Dublin’s cultural quarter. The area was described in a pre-1996 Dublin Tourism booklet as a network of narrow, cobbled eighteenth-century streets evolving into an inner-city Bohemia with restaurants, theatres, cafes, arts centres, galleries, and second-hand shops, with old buildings restored, streets recobbled, and new street lighting installed.

On 1 July 1996, The Ark children’s cultural centre in Meeting House Square was inaugurated with a performance by soprano Virginia Kerr and concerts featuring Anuna, Shaun Davey, and the Corrs. During the same period, the Temple Bar area underwent extensive urban renewal, with renovated historic buildings and contemporary cultural facilities, including the Irish Film Institute and the Gallery of Photography. Gates were erected around Meeting House Square in 1997 to close it at night due to concerns about vandalism and anti-social behaviour, and by April of that year, the area’s nightlife was reported to be dominated by pubs, restaurants, nightclubs, and tourist shops.

In 1998, the Dublin City Development Plan was amended to encourage a mix of daytime and nighttime activities to prevent licenced premises from dominating the area, though this policy was quietly abandoned by 2005. In 1999, stag parties and hen nights were reportedly discouraged from Temple Bar due to excessive drunken behaviour, though enforcement was inconsistent. Noise and anti-social behaviour remained a concern as of 2008.

At its peak in 2011, the Temple Bar residential population reached approximately 2,000, mainly in the west end between Parliament Street and Fishamble Street. From 2015 onwards, many long-term rental apartments were converted into short-term tourist accommodations through platforms such as Airbnb and the Key Collection, reducing the permanent population. Author Neal Doherty described the area in 2015 as a vibrant and energetic district full of pubs, restaurants, and galleries, noting that it was not as 'cultural' as originally envisaged but retained some contemporary art and sculpture.

Persistent issues with noise and late-night activity led residents to engage with Dublin City Council, An Bord Pleanála, and other authorities to regulate amplified music and licensing conditions for bars and nightclubs.

== Features ==
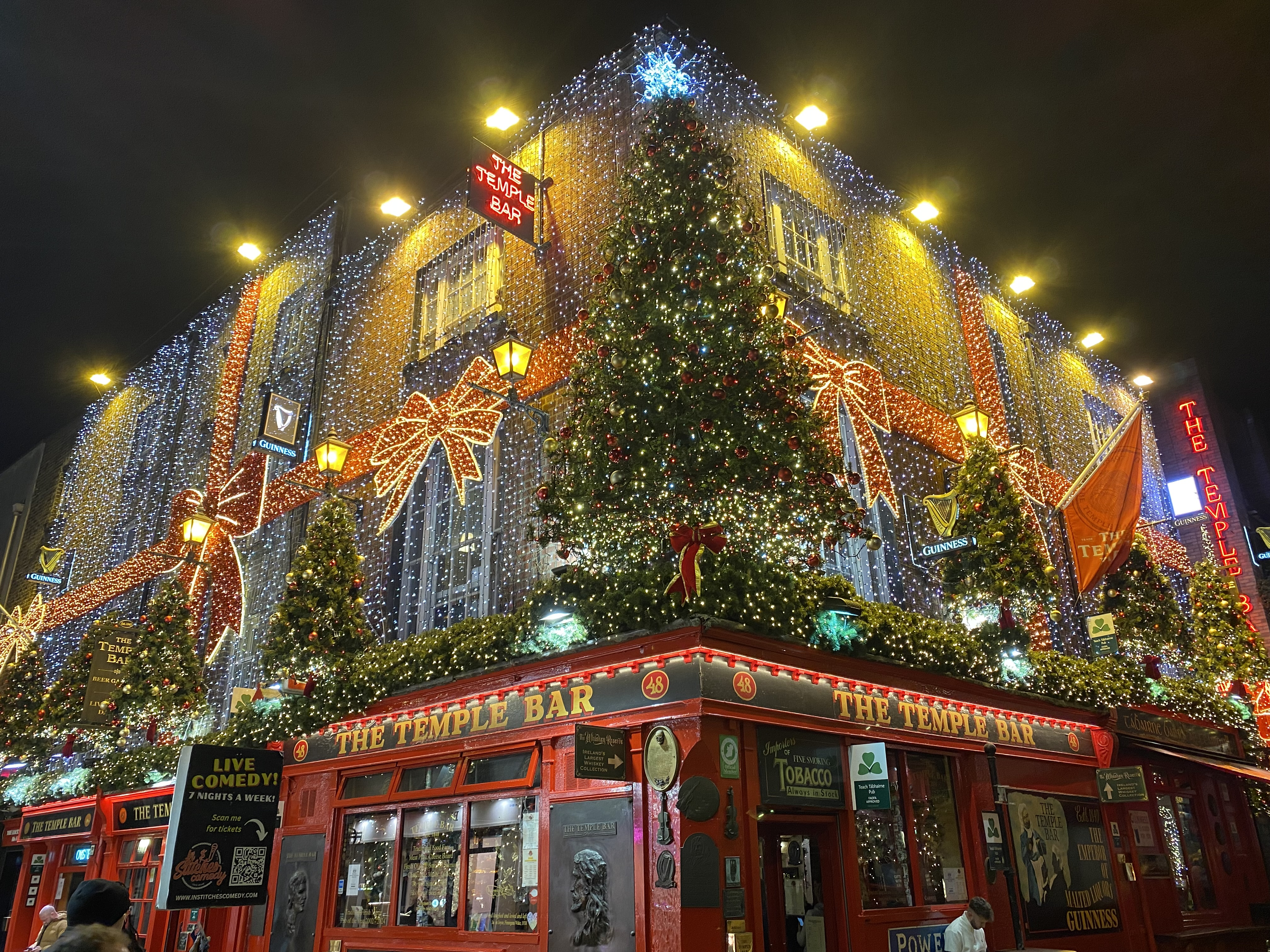
The Temple Bar Pub on Temple Lane

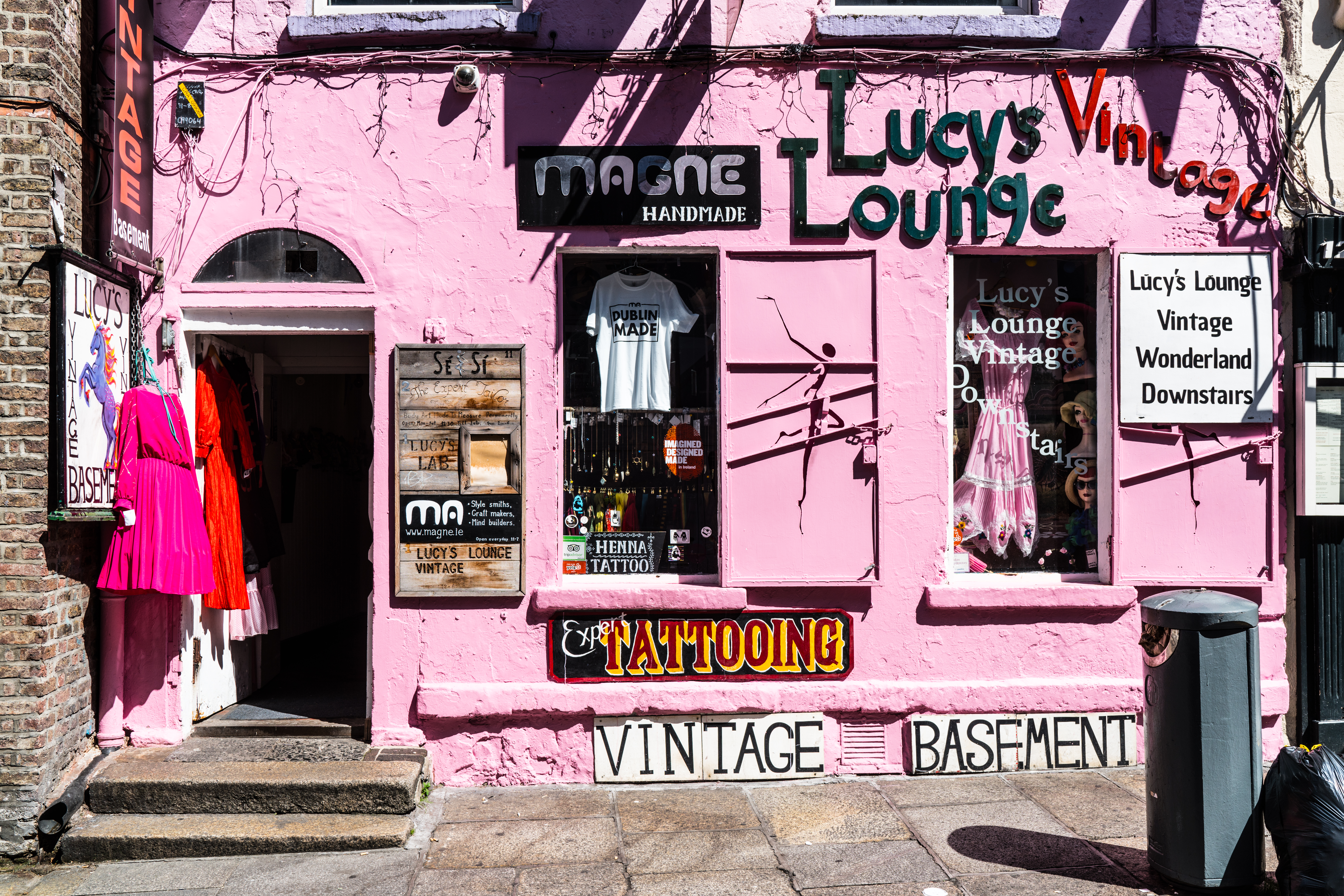
Vintage shops in Temple Bar.

The area is the location of a number of cultural institutions, including the Irish Photography Centre (incorporating the Dublin Institute of Photography, the National Photographic Archive and the Gallery of Photography), the Ark Children's Cultural Centre, the Irish Film Institute, incorporating the Irish Film Archive, the Button Factory (music venue and club), the Arthouse Multimedia Centre, Temple Bar Gallery and Studios, the Project Arts Centre, the Gaiety School of Acting, IBAT College Dublin, the New Theatre, as well as the Irish Stock Exchange.

At night the area is a centre for nightlife, with various nightclubs, restaurants and bars geared towards tourists. Pubs in the area include The Temple Bar pub, and The Porterhouse.

The area has two renovated squares – Meeting House Square and the central Temple Bar Square. The Temple Bar Book Market is held on Saturdays and Sundays in Temple Bar Square. Meetinghouse Square, which takes its name from the nearby Quaker Meeting House, is used for outdoor film screenings in the summer months. Since summer 2004, Meetinghouse Square is also home to the 'Speaker's Square' project (an area of public speaking) and the 'Temple Bar Food Market' on Saturdays.

The 'Cow's Lane Market' is a fashion and design market which takes place on Cow's Lane on Saturdays.

Part of the 13th-century Augustinian Friary of the Holy Trinity is visible within an apartment/restaurant complex called 'The Friary'.

== In popular culture ==
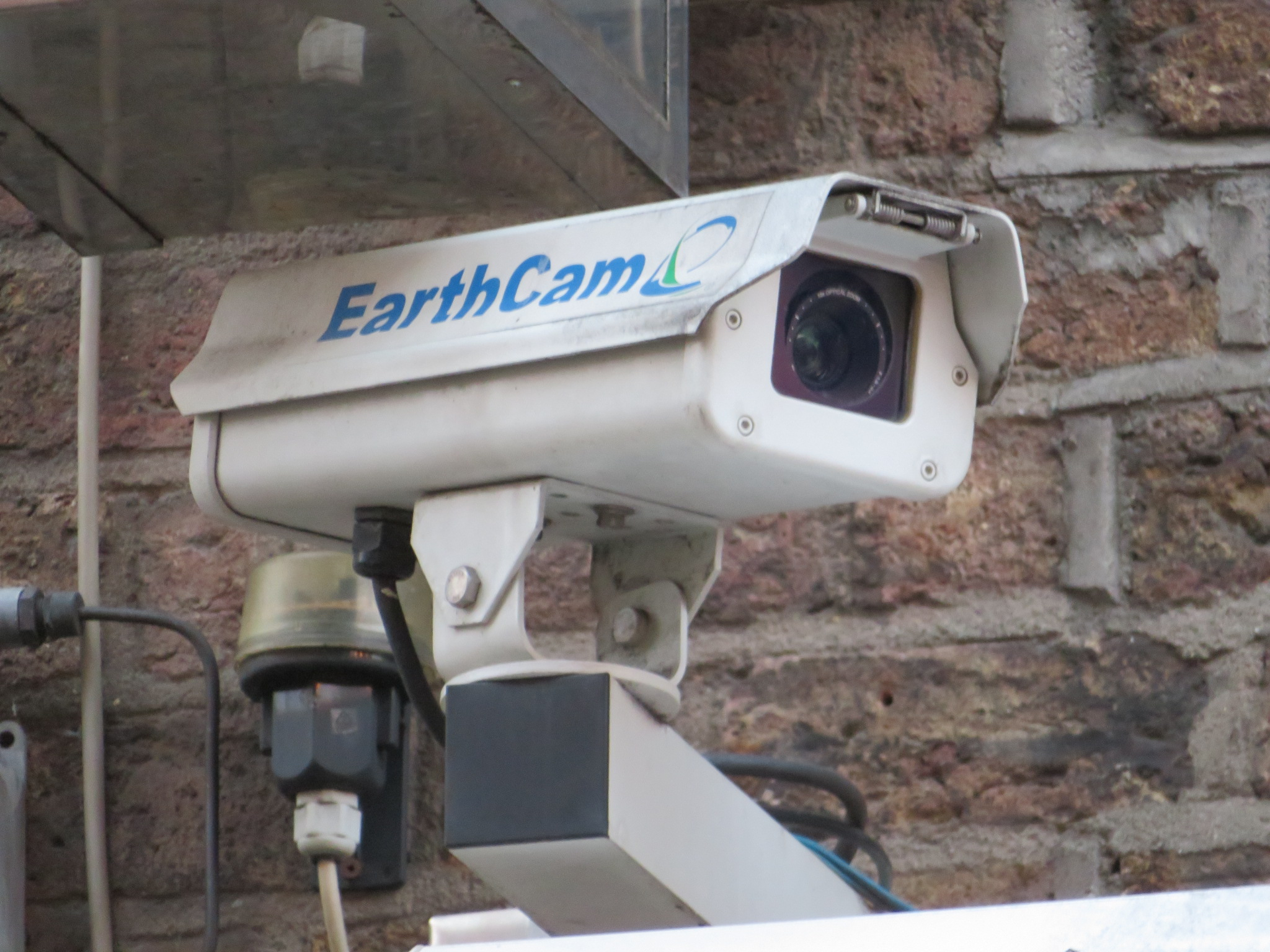
EarthCam in Temple Bar

A dance sequence from the Bollywood film Ek Tha Tiger was filmed in the area. Irish singer/songwriter Billy Treacy wrote a song about the area, and country singer Nathan Carter as well as Irish rock band Kodaline have released songs called Temple Bar.

== See also ==
- List of streets and squares in Dublin
